= 80/35 Music Festival =

Multi-day music festival in Iowa, United States of America

Coordinates: 41°35′6.94″N 93°38′4.43″W

- Dates: July 12–13, 2024
- Locations: Western Gateway Park 2008–2023; Water Works Park (Des Moines) 2024; Des Moines, Iowa, United States
- Years active: 2008–2019, 2022–present
- Founders: Greater Des Moines Music Coalition
- Website: Festival Website

80/35 Music Festival is a multi-day music festival in Des Moines, Iowa. The name comes from two prominent interstates, I-80 and I-35, which intersect in Des Moines. The festival includes a stage for national touring bands and several smaller stages featuring regional and local supporting acts. In addition to music, there are booths for local organizations, interactive art, food and beverage sales, and resting places.

The festival brings an estimated attendance of over 30,000 people annually since 2008. More than 45 acts are featured each year. Past headliners have included The Flaming Lips, The Roots, Public Enemy, Modest Mouse, The Avett Brothers, David Byrne & St. Vincent, Wu-Tang Clan, and Weezer.

The festival is nearly 100% volunteer run and is organized by the Greater Des Moines Music Coalition, a 501(c)(3) non-profit committed to building a stronger and more diverse live music economy in greater Des Moines.

On July 7, 2023, it was announced that the festival will move to nearby Water Works Park in 2024. As stated on the 80/35 Facebook page, "With 1,500 acres of natural space, the park will provide more access to nature, space to expand the festival, and opportunities to highlight issues important to us including environmental consciousness and preservation." From the 80/35 website, "The 2024 edition will feature multiple stages of music, with a mix of free and ticketed entertainment in keeping with the festival’s long-standing tradition. In addition, 2024 will see an expanded retail market, more food vendors, a kids and family zone, and much more."

== Lineups ==
=== 2024 ===
Hy-Vee Main Stage

- Friday, July 12: SUSTO, Dreamer Isioma, OK GO
- Saturday, July 13: Emmet Phillips & The Impact, The Uniphonics, The Maytags, Winona Fighter, Bully, Hiatus Kaiyote, Killer Mike

People's Stage

- Friday, July 12: Tripmaster Monkey, Tropa Magica, The Stone Foxes
- Saturday, July 13: Girls Rock! DSM, Belin Quartet, 10 Watt Robot, Heavy Crownz, The Finese, Foxy Shazam, Durry

Alchemy Stage

- Friday, July 12: Joel Sires' Hangdog Quartet, Lightcub, Halfloves
- Saturday, July 13: Neva Alden, Bella Moss, Munk Rivers, Abbie & The Sawyers, Green Death, Lady Revel, Hendy

Silent State

- Friday, July 12: Jim Swim, Ryan Lombard, Katie & The Honky-Tonks, Ahzia, Cirque Wonderland
- Saturday, July 13: Acid Legs, The Han Solo Project, Kashi, Wave Cage, Mr. Softheart, Gold Revere, The Tripp Brothers, Extravision, Cique Wonderland

=== 2023 ===
Hy-Vee Main Stage

- Friday, July 7: Elizabeth Moen, Deerhoof, Sudan Archives, The War on Drugs
- Saturday, July 8: Emma Butterworth, Ancient Posse, Ax and the Hatchetman, William Elliot Whitmore, Blu DeTiger, Cautious Clay, Big Boi

Kum & Go Stage

- Friday, July 7: DMMC Summer Camps, Ramona and the Sometimes, Taels, Gustaf, Ri Wilson
- Saturday, July 8: Girls Rock! Des Moines, Glass Ox, Basketball Divorce Court, Allegra Hernandez, Kyle James, Kiss the Tiger, McKinley Dixon, Disq, Etran De L'Air, Thumpasaurus

Bud & Mary's Stage

- Friday, July 7: Monstrophe, Pictoria Vark, Neil Anders & the Brothers Merritt, Maxilla Blue, House of Large Sizes
- Saturday, July 8: Lost Souls Found, The Crust Band, Belin Quartet, Zap Tura, Penny Peach, Lady Revel, Hurry Up Brothers, Us Vs Them, Annie Kemble, Lipstick Homicide

Iowa Public Radio Stage

- Friday, July 7: Big Salt, Annie Kemble + B.Well, Salt Fox
- Saturday, July 8: Flash in a Pan, Surf Zombies, Greg Wheeler & the Poly Mall Cops, Flyspace, Sharane Calister, McKinley Dixon + Teller Bank$

=== 2022 ===
Hy-Vee Main Stage

- Friday, July 8: Guided by Voices, Japanese Breakfast, Father John Misty
- Saturday, July 9: B.Well, Miloe, Envy Corps, Jamila Woods, Future Islands, Charli XCX

Kum & Go Stage

- Friday, July 8: Hannah Marks: Outsider Outlier, Meet Me @ the Altar, Pachyman, !!! (Chk, Chk, Chk)
- Saturday, July 9: Nathan Apollo, Greg Wheeler and the Poly Mall Cops, James Tutson, PSEUDO, Evann McIntosh, Geese, Haiku Hands, BLACKSTARKIDS, MonoNeon

Bravo Stage

- Friday, July 8: Stars Hollow, Juliano Dock, Pctoria Vark, Trevor Sensor, Maddie Poppe
- Saturday, July 9: NOLA Jazz Band, Colo Chanel, Dose, Anthony Worden, Alyx Rush, Widow7, Avey Grouws Band, Mike Valley and the Complete Disaster, Diplomats of Solid Sound, Vended

Emerging Artists Stage

- Friday, July 8: DMMS Summer Camp, 28 Days Later, The Crust Band
- Saturday, July 9: Dirty Blonde, Quinn Trilk, Wait What?, Girls Rock! Des Moines, Kelsie James, Plumero

=== 2019 ===
Hy-Vee Main Stage

- Friday, July 12: Elle King, Metric, YUNGBLUD (canceled due to travel problems)
- Saturday, July 13: Portugal. The Man, MisterWives, Noname (canceled due to health concerns), Liz Phair, Dessa, Sadat X & El w/ DJ Kaos, And The Kids

Kum & Go Stage

- Friday, July 12: Lissie, Murder By Death
- Saturday, July 13: Open Mike Eagle, The Beths, The Harmaleighs, Sidewalk Chalk, Dressy Bessy

Nationwide Stage

- Friday, July 12: Josh Hoyer & Soul Colossal, MarKaus, Squirrel Flower, Hex Girls, Closed Format presents Disco Demolition
- Saturday, July 13: The Envy Corps, DICKIE, Druids, LAV.ISH, Crystal City, The Other Brothers, Younger, Left Is West, Lady Revel, DJ Raj and Friends

Gen Z Showcase

- Friday, July 12: Queen Kenzie, Plumero, Jolie Seitz
- Saturday, July 13: COLDSAINT, EleanorGrace, Greta & Adaline Akers, Girls Rock! DSM, DMMC Summer Camps: Hip-Hop, DMMC Summer Camps: Rock

=== 2018 ===
Hy-Vee Main Stage

- Friday, July 6: Phoebe Bridgers, Atmosphere, Phantogram
- Saturday, July 7: Field Division, Vagabon, BJ The Chicago Kid, Car Seat Headrest, Courtney Barnett, Kesha

Kum & Go Stage

- Friday, July 6: Pink Neighbor, Nnamdi Ogbonnaya, Remo Drive, Jeff Rosenstock, Closed Format
- Saturday, July 7: Honeycreeper, Naked Giants, Greg Grease, Sawyer Fredericks, Ratboys, Zeshan B, Soccer Mommy, Priscilla Renea, The Poison Control Center, BassRaja and Pri yon Joni with Himanshu on Dhol

Nationwide Stage

- Friday, July 6: Da Younger, Matthew James & The Rust Belt Union, Closet Witch, Elizabeth Moen
- Saturday, July 7: Comandante, Starry Nights, Foxholes, Ramona & the Sometimes, Karen Meat, The Host Country, Extravision, Telekinetic Yeti, B.Well

=== 2017 ===
Hy-Vee Main Stage

- Friday, July 7: Elephant Revival, Charles Bradley & His Extraordinaires, MGMT
- Saturday, July 8: prettygirlhatemachine, Coral Creek, Hop Along, The Maytags, The Motet, The Shins

Kum & Go Stage

- Friday, July 7: Lily DeTaeye, The Suburbs, Pigeons Playing Ping Pong, Bully, Closed Format
- Saturday, July 8: Closet Witch, ZULUZULUU, Bad Bad Hats, WebsterX, Henhouse Prowlers, A Giant Dog, Modern Life Is War, Diarrhea Planet, Chicano Batman, DJ Apollo, DJ Chris Coffey, BassRaja

Nationwide Stage

- Friday, July 7: The Vahnevants, Elizabeth Moen, MarKaus, Radio Moscow
- Saturday, July 8: Glitter Density, Stutterin' Jimmy & The Goosebumps, Aaron Earl Short, Traffic Death, Ancient Posse, Tha Füt, Dan Tedesco, Trevor Sensor, Middle Western

Coca-Cola Gen Z Showcase

- Friday, July 7: Jackson Overton & Tyler Fraaken, Trevor Lambert, Comandante Marcos
- Saturday, July 8: DMMC Summer Camps, Girls Rock! Des Moines, Serenade Your Mother, Queen Kenzie, The Yelps

=== 2016 ===
Hy-Vee Main Stage

- Friday, July 8: Wolf Parade, Lotus, Nas
- Saturday, July 9: TWINS, Druids, Thao & The Get Down Stay Down, Jeff Austin Band, Black Lips, The Decemberists

Kum & Go Stage

- Friday, July 8: Courtney Krause, The Pistol Whippin Party Penguins, Dilly Dally, Craig Finn, Jeana Calvert, Jade Reed b2b Brad Goldman
- Saturday, July 9: Odd Pets, Genome, Ravyn Lenae, France Camp, Mikel Wright & The Wrongs, Vic Spencer, Colleen Green, Lucky Chops, Lizzo, Dem Boyz vs RAGEthat, DJ RAJ and Strobe Trotters

Nationwide Stage

- Friday, July 8: The Smoothsayers, TIRES, MarKaus, Holy White Hounds
- Saturday, July 9: FRO, Easy Fruit, The Dead Line String Band, The Cardinal Sound, Goldblums, SIRES, MaZoo, MAIDS, Green Death

=== 2015 ===
Hy-Vee Main Stage

- Friday, July 10: St. Lucia, Jenny Lewis, Wilco
- Saturday, July 11: Canby, Jon Wayne and the Pain, Cloud Nothings, Lettuce, Run The Jewels, Weezer

Kum & Go Stage

- Friday, July 10: Rome Fortune, Fly Golden Eagle, Hot Buttered Rum, Talib Kweli, Jade Reed and Tobias Cross, RackCity and Brad Goldman
- Saturday, July 11: Boh Doran, Kind Country, The Kickback, Amasa Hines, Jaden Carlson Band, Natural Child, Empires, Head for the Hills, The Orwells, Jesse Jamz, DJ RAJ, Dem Boyz

Nationwide Stage

- Friday, July 10: Field Division, Karen Meat & the Computer, Mighty Shady, Asphate, Damon Dotson
- Saturday, July 11: Fuzzy Logic, The Olympics, prettygirlhatemachine, The High Crest, Parranderos Latin Combo, Brazilian 2wins, Christopher the Conquered, Annalibera, The Maytags

=== 2014 ===
Main Stage

- Friday, July 4: Brother Trucker, Gloom Balloon, Dawes, Best Coast, Ziggy Marley, Conor Oberst
- Saturday, July 5: Boy & Bear, Raz Simone, The Envy Corps, Xavier Rudd, Dr. Dog, Cake

Kum & Go Stage

- Friday, July 4: Quick Piss, Fury Things, Chicago Farmer, TREE, Circle of Heat, Black Diet, Pert Near Sandstone, The Hooten Hallers, Surfer Blood, JohnnyRAGE, Gorilla Stomp Squad
- Saturday, July 5: Dat Dude Biggz, Har-di-Har, Soap, Shy Boys, Useful Jenkins, The Whigs, Caroline Smith, King Fantastic, Those Darlins, DJ Raj, Jesse Jamz

Hy-Vee Stage

- Friday, July 4: M34n Str33t, Fire Sale, TWINS, Cirrus Minor, Bonne Finken, GoodcaT, MAIDS, Max Jury, The River Monks, DJ G Mint, Brad Goldman and Tobias Cross present CLIMAX
- Saturday, July 5: Volcano Boys, Zeta June, Foxholes, Kris Adams, James Biehn, Parlours, Aquamarine Dream Machine, Holy White Hounds, The Maytags, Shawn Shady, Cloudy with a Chance of Techno, TimeWlkr

=== 2013 ===
Main Stage

- Friday, July 5: Tea Leaf Green, Yeasayer, David Byrne & St. Vincent
- Saturday, July 6: Dylan Sires & Neighbors, Mr. Baber's Neighbors, Wavves, Umphrey's McGee, Deerhunter, Wu-Tang Clan

Kum & Go Stage

- Friday, July 5: Annalibera, Kitty Pryde, Roster McCabe, Menomena, SUBliminal Chaos, Jesse Jamz, DJ Bui
- Saturday, July 6: Gloom Balloon, Prissy Clerks, Escondido, Water Liars, The Homemade Jamz Blues Band, Apollo Brown & Guilty Simpson, Strange Names, Jon Wayne & the Pain, House of Large Sizes, DJ Cosmo, The Baloney Bros, DJ Flash

Hy-Vee Stage

- Friday, July 5: Emperors Club, Dusting Smith & The Sunday Silos, Maxilla Blue, Euforquestra, The Other Elements, M34N STR33T, Richie Daggers w/ Gadema
- Saturday, July 6: Mighty Shady, Uniphonics, H.D. Harmsen, SP3, Tires, Trouble Lights, The River Monks, Mumford's, The Pines, I AM ZERO, Patient Zero, I AM ZERO

=== 2012 ===
Wellmark Blue Cross Blue Shield Main Stage

- Friday, July 6: Fucked Up, Dinosaur Jr., The Avett Brothers
- Saturday, July 7: Christopher the Conquered & His Black Gold Brass Band, Greensky Bluegrass, Atmosphere, Leftover Salmon, Death Cab for Cutie

Hy-Vee Triathlon Stage

- Friday, July 6: Tajh, Bright Giant, Pieta Brown
- Saturday, July 7: Little Ruckus, The Sun Company, Mumford's, Maxilla Blue, The Sundogs, Mantis Pincers, Leslie and the LY's, Dead Larry

Kum & Go Stage

- Friday, July 6: Dustin Smith & The Sunday Silos, Dumptruck Butterlips, Useful Jenkins, Freddie Gibbs, DJ Eight Ten, Alex Brown, John Solarz
- Saturday, July 7: Derek Lambert and the Prairie Fires, Now Now, Delta Rae, Mark Mallman, Night Moves, Jaill, Jason Isbell and The 400 Unit, K-Holes, Dan Deacon, Jade Reed, Jesse Jamz, Brad Goldman

=== 2011 ===
Main Stage

- Saturday, July 2: The Chatty Cathys, The Reverend Peyton's Big Damn Band, Titus Andronicus, Edward Sharpe and the Magnetic Zeros, Galactic, Girl Talk
- Sunday, July 3: Rebel Creek, Yelawolf, Karl Denson's Tiny Universe, Okkervil River, Grace Potter and the Nocturnals, of Montreal

Kum & Go Stage

- Saturday, July 2: Wolfgang, NewVillager, Generationals, Cory Chisel and The Wandering Sons, The Junkyard Orchestra, BBU, Bitch, Jessica Lea Mayfield, Blackalicious
- Sunday, July 3: Infantree, Bear Hands, The Giving Tree Band, Pink Mink, Gold Motel, Civil Twilight, WhiteWater Ramble, Handsome Furs, The Macpodz

Local Stage

- Saturday, July 2: Grinning Match, Wolves in the Attic, La Strange, Brother Trucker, Christopher the Conquered, Thankful Dirt, Cashes Rivers, The Poison Control Center, Mr. Baber's Neighbors
- Sunday, July 3: Love Songs for Lonely Monsters, Land of Blood and Sunshine, The Uniphonics, The River Monks, DCM, The Workshy, Parlours, & The Body Electric, The Envy Corps

=== 2010 ===
Wellmark Blue Cross Blue Shield Main Stage

- Saturday, July 4: Omega Dog, Particle, Yo La Tengo, Slightly Stoopid, Spoon
- Sunday, July 5: The Workshy, Avi Buffalo, The Walkmen, Railroad Earth, The Cool Kids, Modest Mouse

Kum & Go Stage

- Saturday, July 4: Modern Day Satire, Canby, Psalm One, Cashes Rivers, Zola Jesus, Solid Gold, William Elliott Whitmore, Earl Greyhound, Holly Golightly & The Brokeoffs
- Sunday, July 5: Dawes, Family Groove Company, Christopher the Conquered, Sara Watkins, Evangelicals, Califone, Dar Williams, The Heavy

Mediacom Stage

- Saturday, July 4: Adapt, Flatform, El Guante, Tim Grimes, W.A.S.T.E.L.A.N.D.S., Mustafa Avdic, St. Paul Slim, Oz & Dave Leo, Tripp Marxx
- Sunday, July 5: Cleo's Apartment, Kanser, Raj w/ Leeman, DJ Diverse, Maxilla Blue, Qwel, Brad Goldman & Mimic

=== 2009 ===
Wellmark Blue Cross Blue Shield Main Stage

- Friday, July 3: Tilly and the Wall, Matisyahu, Stephen Malkmus and The Jicks, Public Enemy
- Saturday, July 4: Poison Control Center, New Monsoon, Man Man, G. Love & Special Sauce, Broken Social Scene, Ben Harper and Relentless7

Mediacom East Stage

- Friday, July 3: William Fitzsimmons, Modern Skirts, Maps And Atlases, The Nadas, House of Large Sizes
- Saturday, July 4: Hanwell, Beati Paoli, Miss Derringer, Audrye Sessions, The Josh Davis Band, Wild Sweet Orange, Cleo's Apartment, Mr. Baber's Neighbors, Brother Ali

Meredith West Stage

- Friday, July 3: Mooseknuckle, The Dig Angees, The Autumn Project, Occidental Brothers, Public Property, DJ Diverse, Brad Goldman and Jade Reed
- Saturday, July 4: Anni Rossi, Baby Teeth, Paper Route, Girl in a Coma, Floodplane, Cymbals Eat Guitars, Margot & the Nuclear So and So's, The Envy Corps, All Bugs, Al Brown, Flatform

=== 2008 ===
Main Stage

- Friday, July 4: Des Moines Boyz, Ingrid Michaelson, Andrew Bird, The Flaming Lips
- Saturday, July 5: Public Property, Dirty Little Rabbits, Drive-By Truckers, Jakob Dylan, Black Francis, Yonder Mountain String Band, The Roots

East Stage

- Friday, July 4: Headlights, Euforquestra, Diplomats of Solid Sound, Mr. Baber's Neighbors
- Saturday, July 5: David Zollo and The Body Electric, North of Grand, Neva Dinova, The Autumn Project, Brother Trucker, Family Groove Company, Poison Control Center, Pieta Brown

West Stage

- Friday, July 4: The Dig Angees, Colourmusic, Rock Plaza Central, Cracker
- Saturday, July 5: The Vandon Arms, GaiDen Gadema, Deanna Devore, KaiserCartel, MooseKnuckle, Ezra Furman & The Harpoons, Maxilla Blue, Radio Moscow, The Envy Corps

DJ Stage

- Friday, July 4: Al Brown, Flatform
- Saturday, July 5: DJ Flash, Jade Reed, TouchNice, Tim Grimes, Brad Goldman, DJ Diverse
