= Stephen Rapp =

American lawyer and politician

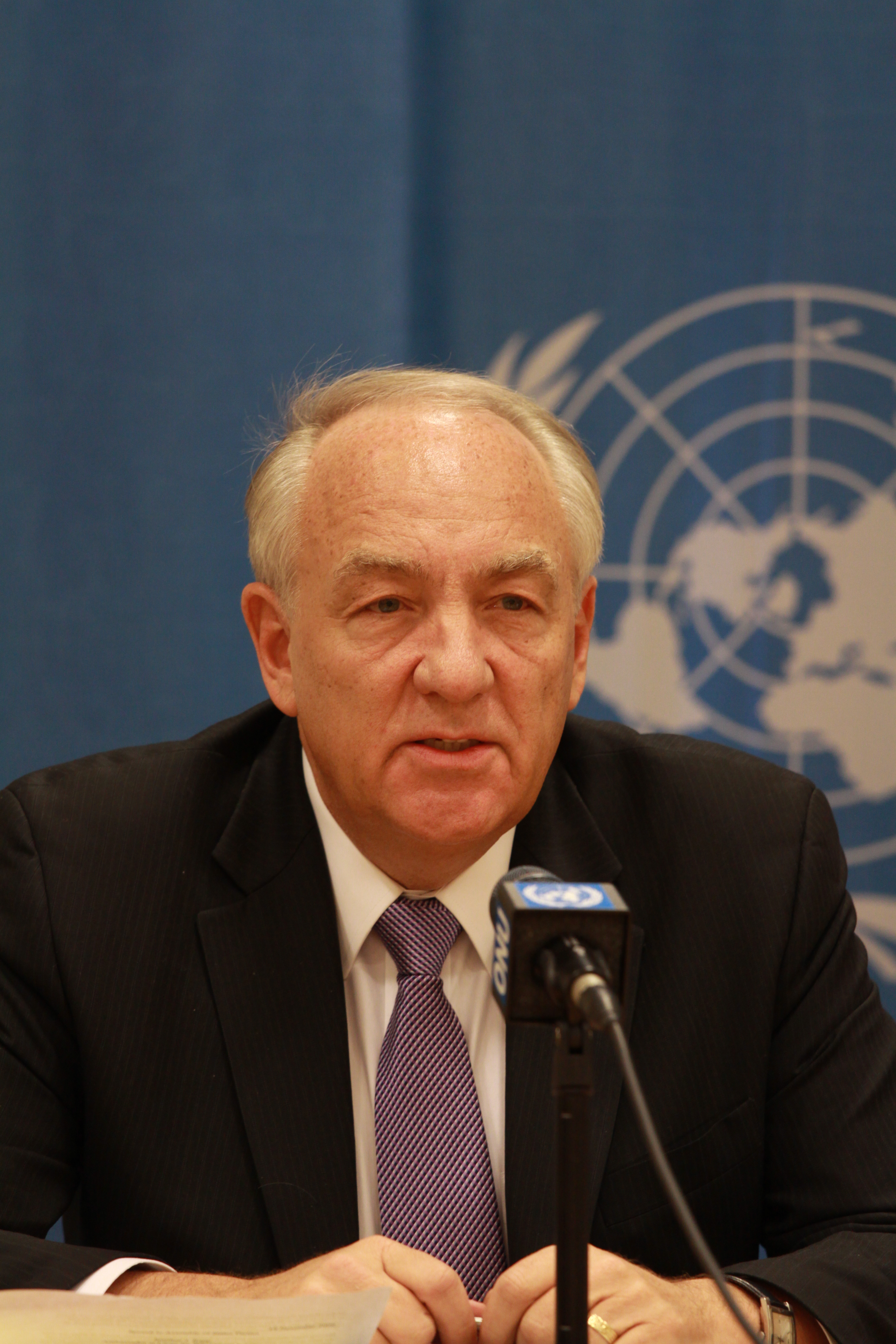

4th United States Ambassador-at-Large for War Crimes Issues
- In office September 8, 2009 – August 7, 2015
- President: Barack Obama
- Preceded by: John Williamson
- Succeeded by: Todd F. Buchwald

Member of the Iowa House of Representatives from the 34th district
- In office January 8, 1973 – January 12, 1975
- Preceded by: Larry N. Larson
- Succeeded by: M. Peter Middleton
- In office January 8, 1979 – January 9, 1983
- Preceded by: Albert L. Garrison
- Succeeded by: David M. Tabor

Personal details
- Born: January 26, 1949 (age 77) Waterloo, Iowa
- Party: Democratic
- Education: Harvard University; Columbia University; Drake University

Stephen J. Rapp (born January 26, 1949) is an American lawyer, academic and former politician who served as United States ambassador-at-large for war crimes issues in the Office of Global Criminal Justice. He previously served as Member of the Iowa House of Representatives from the 34th district from 1973 to 1975 and from 1979 to 1983.

== Early life ==
Rapp was born January 26, 1949 in Waterloo, Iowa. He received an BA with honors from Harvard University in government and international relations. He attended Columbia Law School and received his JD with honors from Drake University.

== Career ==
Rapp has been a lawyer in private practice, a Democratic member of the Iowa House of Representatives, and a staff director and counsel for the U.S. Senate Judiciary Committee. Rapp ran for the U.S. House of Representatives for Iowa's 3rd congressional district twice, losing to Charles Grassley. From 1993 to 2001, Rapp was the U.S. Attorney for the Northern District of Iowa. In 2001, he joined the International Criminal Tribunal for Rwanda, where he led the prosecution in the "media trial" against the leaders of the RTLM radio station and Kangura newspaper for inciting the Rwandan genocide of 1994. He became the chief of prosecutions of the ICTR in 2005, and continued to assist chief prosecutor Hassan Jallow in prosecuting those involved in the 1994 genocide. In 2007, Rapp succeeded Desmond de Silva to become the third chief prosecutor of the Special Court for Sierra Leone, where he directed the prosecution of former Liberian President Charles Taylor and others alleged to have violated international criminal law during the Sierra Leone Civil War.

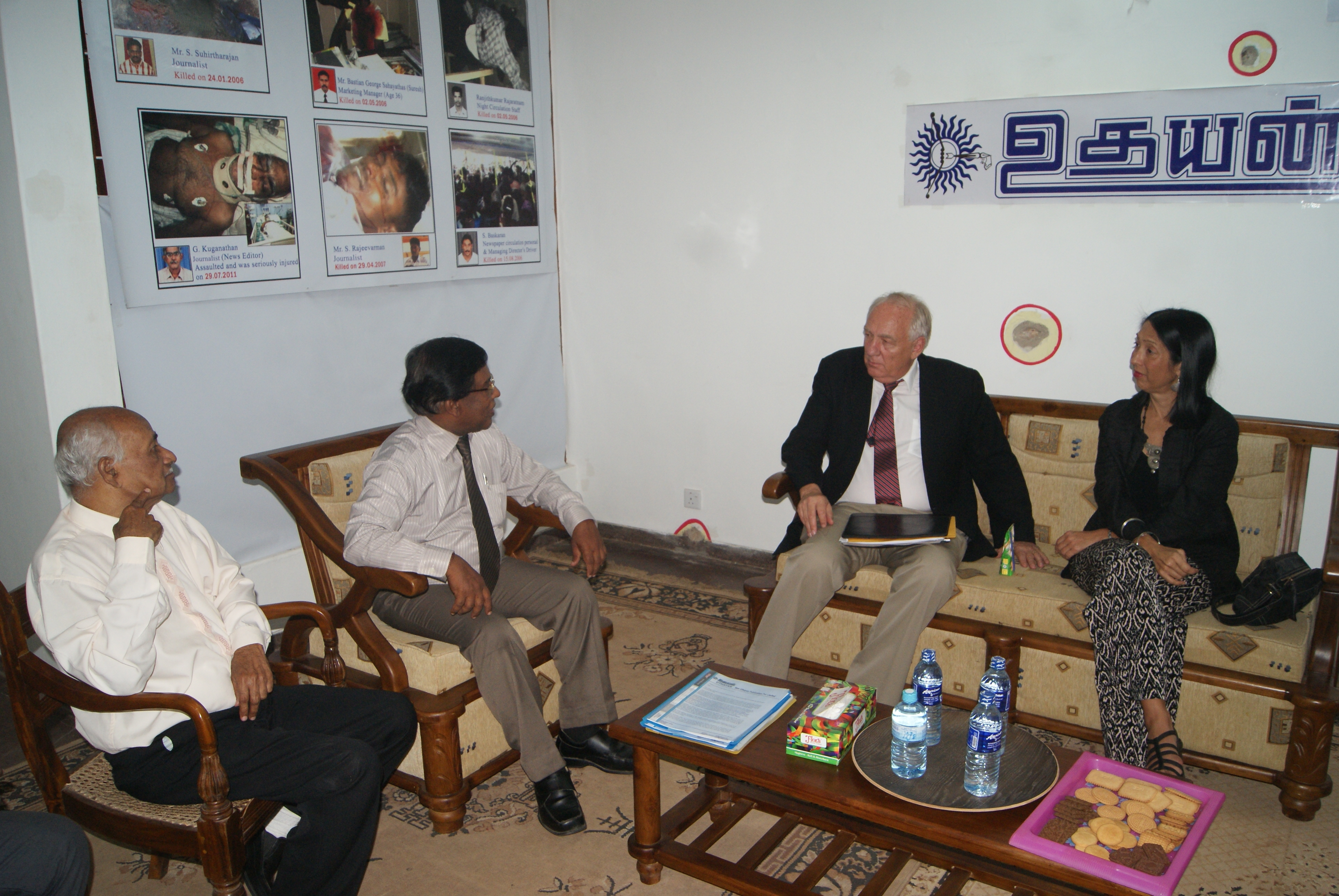
Stephen J. Rapp and Michele J. Sison, US ambassador to Sri Lanka are discussing with E. Saravanapavan, managing director of the Uthayan newspaper and M. V. Kanamaylnathan, Editor-in-chief at Uthayan Newspapers's Office in Jaffna on 8 January 2014. Some of the bullet holes and portraits of slain staff are visible on the wall behind them.

Rapp was appointed ambassador-at-large for war crimes issues by President Barack Obama, and confirmed by the U.S. Senate on September 8, 2009. Rapp led the State Department's Office of Global Criminal Justice. In that position, he advised the secretary of state and the under secretary for civilian security, democracy, and human rights and worked to formulate U.S. policy on prevention and accountability for mass atrocities. He stepped down from the post on August 7, 2015.

Secretary of State Madeleine Albright created the position of ambassador-at-large for war crimes issues in 1997 in order to bring focus in American foreign policy to the twin imperatives of enabling the prevention of, and ensuring accountability for, atrocities around the world. In 1997, President William J. Clinton appointed David Scheffer to serve as the first advisor to the Secretary of State on U.S. policy responses to atrocity crimes. In 2001, President George W. Bush appointed Pierre-Richard Prosper to serve as ambassador-at-large to Secretary of State Colin Powell, and, in 2005, he appointed John Clint Williamson to succeed Prosper as ambassador-at-large to Secretary of State Condoleezza Rice.

In February 2011, Rapp gave a lecture entitled "Achieving Justice for Victims of Genocide, War Crimes and Crimes Against Humanity" at the University of San Diego's Joan B. Kroc Institute for Peace & Justice Distinguished Lecture Series.

The office coordinates U.S. government support for ad hoc and international courts trying persons accused of genocide, war crimes, and crimes against humanity committed (among other places) in the former Yugoslavia, Rwanda, Sierra Leone, and Cambodia, and helps bolster the capacity of domestic judicial systems to try atrocity crimes. It also works closely with other governments, international institutions, and non-governmental organizations to establish and assist international and domestic commissions, courts, and tribunals to investigate, judge, and deter atrocity crimes in every region of the globe. The ambassador-at-large coordinates the deployment of a range of diplomatic, legal, economic, military, and intelligence tools to help expose the truth, judge those responsible, protect and assist victims, enable reconciliation, and build the rule of law.

In an interview with the CBS newsmagazine 60 minutes about ongoing war crimes investigations on Syria, Rapp stated that there was more incriminating evidence against Syrian president Bashar al-Assad "than we had against the Nazis at Nuremberg" due to the existence of official documents and photographs that were smuggled out of the country.

In 2015, Rapp was appointed Sonia and Harry Blumenthal Distinguished Fellow at the U..S Holocaust Memorial Center, where he subsequently became a Tom A. Bernstein Genocide Prevention Fellow (2021–24). Currently, Rapp is a Senior Visiting Fellow of Practice at the Blavatnik School of Government, Distinguished Fellow at The Hague Institute for Global Justice, a think tank in The Hague, Netherlands, and a Global Prevention Fellow at the Simon-Skjodt Center for the Prevention of Genocide (U.S. Holocaust Memorial Center).

== See also ==
- United States ambassador-at-large for war crimes issues
