= Beth Van Schaack =

American academic and former diplomat

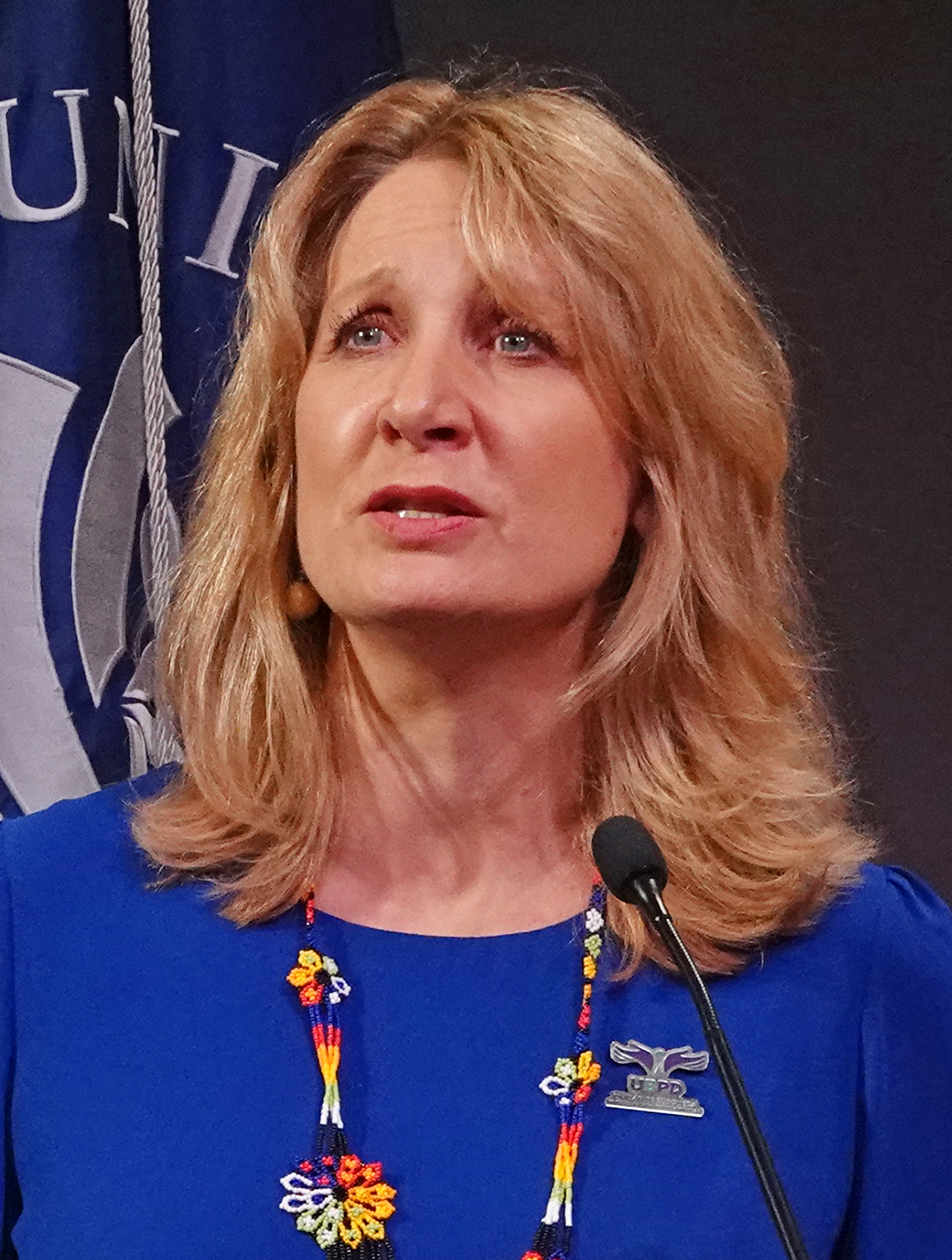

7th United States Ambassador-at-Large for Global Criminal Justice
- In office March 17, 2022 – January 20, 2025
- President: Joe Biden
- Preceded by: Morse Tan

Personal details
- Education: Stanford University (BA); Yale University (JD); Leiden University (PhD)

Beth Van Schaack is an American attorney and academic who served in the Biden administration as the United States Ambassador-at-Large for Global Criminal Justice.

== Early life and education ==
Van Schaack obtained a bachelor of arts from Stanford University, a juris doctor from Yale Law School, and a PhD from Leiden Law School at the University of Leiden.

== Career ==
Van Schaack was a visiting professor in human rights at Stanford Law School, teaching in areas relating to international law and human rights. She has been the acting director of the human rights and conflict resolution clinic. She is a fellow with Stanford's Center for Human Rights and International Justice. She was also a visiting professor at Santa Clara University School of Law focusing on laws of war. As an attorney, she was an associate at Morrison & Foerster LLP, as well as working with the Office of the Prosecutor of the International Criminal Tribunals for Yugoslavia and Rwanda.

=== US State Department ===
She served as Deputy to the Ambassador-at-Large for War Crimes Issues in the Office of Global Criminal Justice at the State Department from 2012 to 2013, advising the present office holder Stephen Rapp. She helped advise the secretary of state and the under secretary of state for civilian security, democracy, and human rights on the formation of U.S. policy aimed at curbing mass atrocities and genocide.

=== Ambassador-at-Large ===
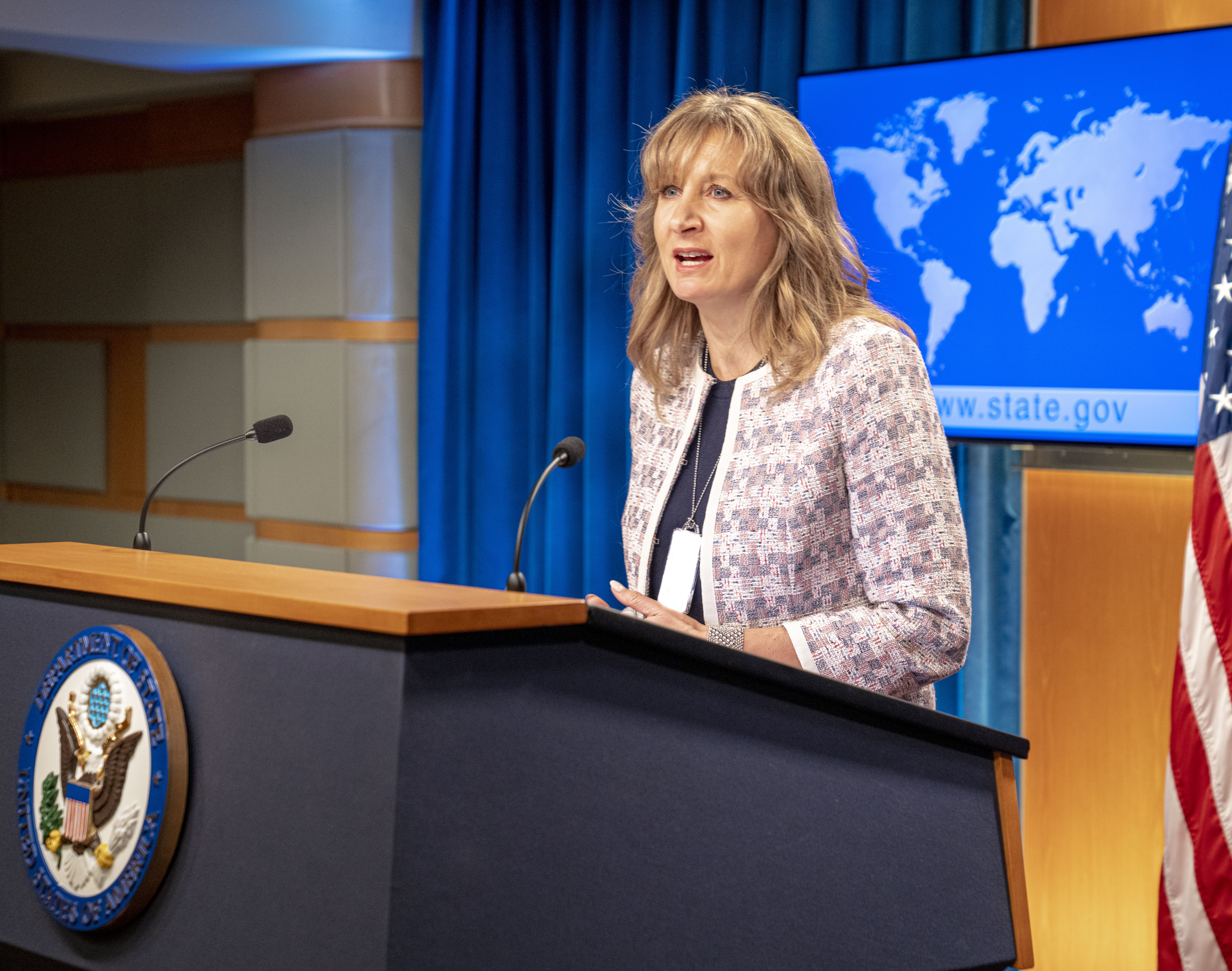
Ambassador Van Schaack at a State Department press briefing on March 23, 2022

On October 21, 2021, President Joe Biden nominated Van Schaack to be the ambassador-at-large for global criminal justice. Hearings on her nomination were held before the Senate Foreign Relations Committee on January 12, 2022. The committee favorably reported her nomination to the Senate floor on March 8, 2022. Van Schaack was confirmed by the full Senate via voice vote on March 15, 2022, and she was sworn in on March 17.

Following the appointment of Marco Rubio as United States Secretary of State, Van Schaack resigned and the Office of Global Criminal Justice was abolished.

== Publications ==
- Imagining Justice for Syria
