= Flying J =

Flying J may refer to:

- FJ Management, the original Flying J Inc.
- Pilot Flying J, a truck stop chain that partially constitutes the former truck stop division of the original Flying J Inc.
