= United States Ambassador-at-Large for Global Criminal Justice =

United States Department of State official

Ambassador-at-Large of the United States for Global Criminal Justice
- Seal of the United States Department of State
- Reports to: Under Secretary of State for Civilian Security, Democracy, and Human Rights
- Nominator: President of the United States
- Formation: 1997
- First holder: David Scheffer

The United States Ambassador-at-Large for Global Criminal Justice is the head of the Office of Global Criminal Justice in the United States Department of State. The ambassador-at-large advises the United States secretary of state and the under secretary of state for civilian security, democracy, and human rights directly and formulates U.S. policy responses to atrocities committed in areas of conflict and elsewhere throughout the world. As the president’s envoy, this ambassador travels worldwide engaging heads of state and international organizations to build bilateral and international support for U.S. policies. As part of this, the ambassador visits affected countries and engages a range of diplomatic, legal, economic, military, and intelligence tools to help secure peace and stability and build the rule of law. As the head of the Office of Global Criminal Justice, this ambassador also has the rank of Assistant Secretary.

David Scheffer served as the first U.S. Ambassador-at-Large for War Crimes Issues (1997–2001). He was followed by Pierre-Richard Prosper (2001–2005), and John Clint Williamson (2006–2009).

In July 2009, U.S. president Barack Obama nominated Stephen Rapp, a former United States attorney and prosecutor for the United Nations Special Court for Sierra Leone, to succeed John Clint Williamson as Ambassador-at-Large for War Crimes Issues. The Senate confirmed him on September 8, 2009, making Rapp the fourth person to hold the title.

== List of ambassadors ==
#	Image	Name	Entry on duty	Termination of appointment
1		David Scheffer	August 5, 1997	January 20, 2001
2		Pierre-Richard Prosper	July 13, 2001	October 12, 2005
3		John Clint Williamson	July 10, 2006	September 8, 2009
4		Stephen Rapp	September 8, 2009	August 7, 2015
5		Todd F. Buchwald	December 30, 2015	July 2017
6		Morse Tan	December 31, 2019	January 20, 2021
-		Michael Kozak (Acting)	January 20, 2021	March 17, 2022
7		Beth Van Schaack	March 17, 2022	January 20, 2025
