= T. L. Kelly =

American politician (1870–1930)

T. L. Kelly (4 April 1870 – 1 January 1930) was an American politician.

Kelly was Catholic and of Irish descent. He was a lifelong resident of Iowa, born in Cass County on 4 April 1870. Kelly married Maggie McGovern on 11 September 1894. At the time of his election to the Iowa House of Representatives, the couple had one son. Kelly served as a state representative from District 34 between 1898 and 1900, and was the first Democrat to be elected from Audubon County. He died on 1 January 1930.
