= Rob Johnson (Iowa politician) =

American politician in Iowa (born 1988)

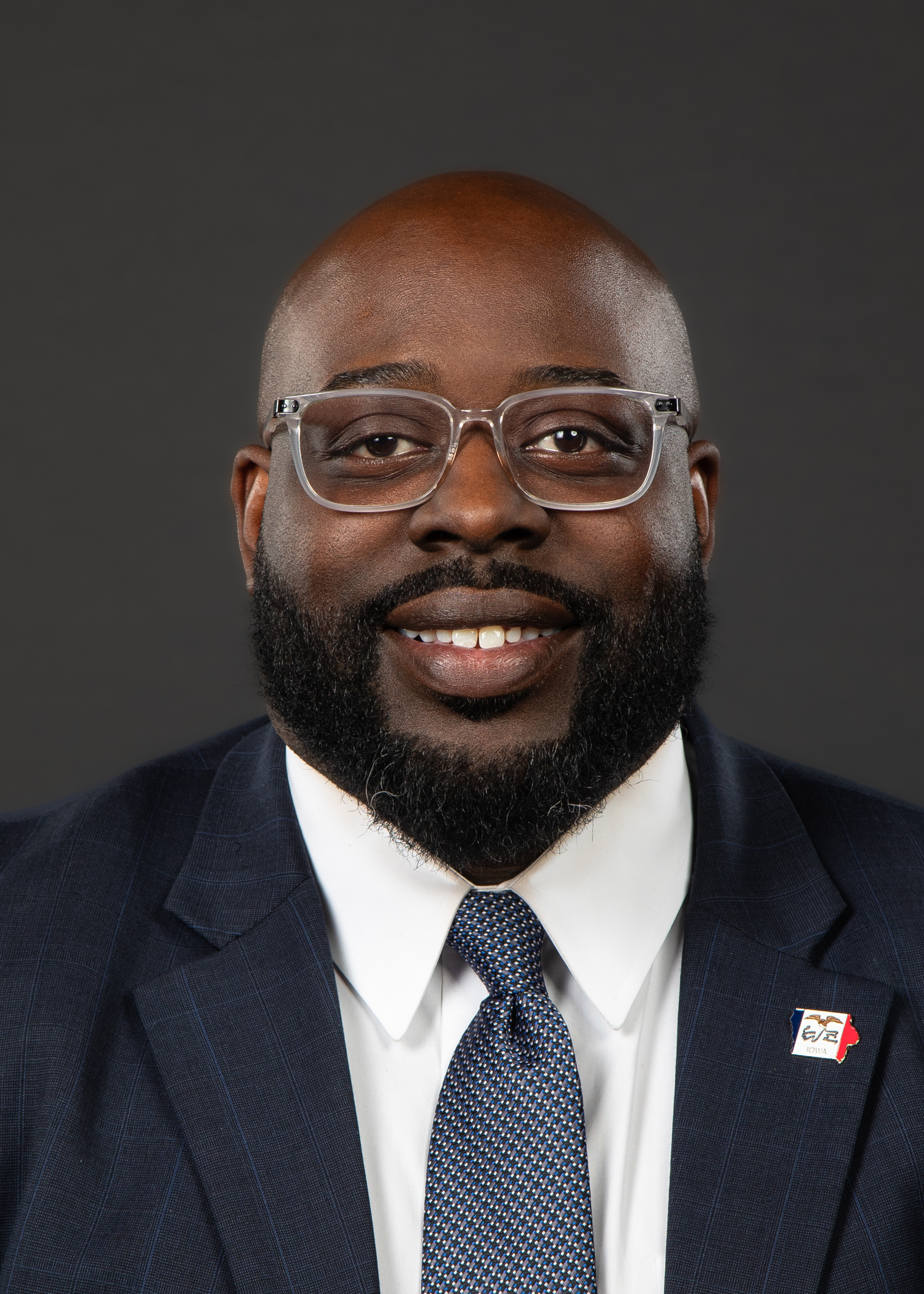

Member of the Iowa House of Representatives from the 34th district
- Incumbent
- Assumed office January 13, 2025
- Preceded by: Ako Abdul-Samad

Personal details
- Born: January 21, 1988 (age 38)
- Party: Democratic
- Occupation: Insurance agent
- Website: Official website

Robert James Johnson (born January 21, 1988) is an American politician. He was elected to the Iowa House of Representatives in November 2024, succeeding Ako Abdul-Samad in District 34.

== Personal life and education ==
Johnson was raised in Chicago by his mother Janice. At the age of six, he and two of his sisters were placed in the care of their godparents before an aunt assumed guardianship. Johnson moved to Des Moines, Iowa, in 2006, and graduated from Drake University in 2010 with a bachelor of arts in politics. While attending Drake, Johnson co-hosted The Young Legends Not Yet but Soon to Be on KDRA-LP. He also served on the Student Senate.

Outside of politics, he works for Wellmark Blue Cross Blue Shield, is an associate minister at Corinthian Baptist Church, and hosts the Fueling Hope Annual Gas Giveaway in Des Moines. The event began in 2022, as a way for Johnson to celebrate his birthday.

== Political career ==
Johnson served as a deputy campaign manager for Ako Abdul-Samad in 2014 and was responsible for religious outreach on behalf of the Democratic ticket in Iowa during the 2018 Iowa Secretary of State election, the 2020 United States presidential election and the 2022 Iowa gubernatorial election. After Abdul-Samad announced his retirement from the Iowa House of Representatives in 2024, Johnson announced his candidacy, and received endorsements from Abdul-Samad and Rob Sand. Johnson won a Democratic Party primary for District 34 against three other candidates, and defeated the Republican candidate Danielle Duggan in the general election.
