= The Kickback (band) =

American indie rock band

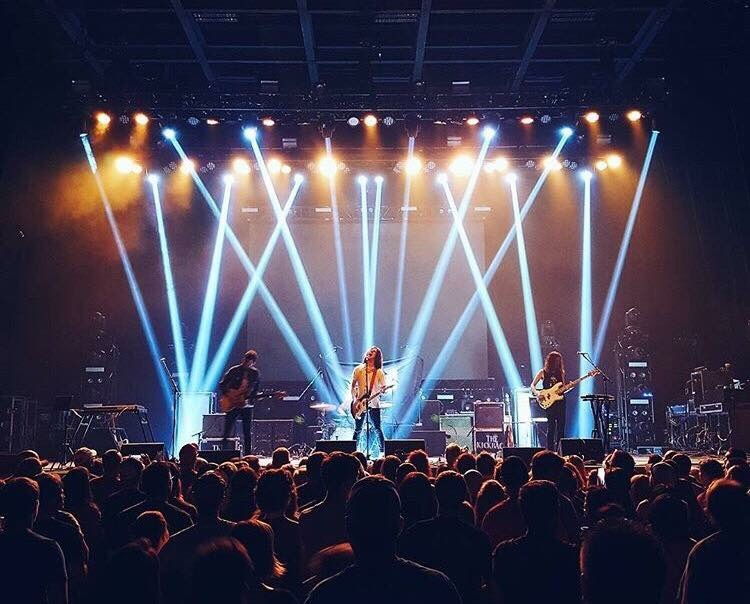
- The Kickback performing in 2017

Background information
- Origin: Vermillion, South Dakota, U.S.
- Genres: Indie rock, alternative rock
- Years active: 2008–present
- Labels: Jullian Records, In Store Recordings, Spat! Records
- Members: Billy Yost; Jonny Ifergan; Daniel Leu
- Website: the-kickback.com

The Kickback is an American indie rock band currently based in Chicago, Illinois. The trio consists of lead Billy Yost, guitarist Jonny Ifergan, and bassist Daniel Leu. They released their debut LP, Sorry All Over the Place, on September 18, 2015, via Jullian Records. The album was recorded by Jim Eno (drummer of Spoon) at his studio Public Hi-Fi in Austin, Texas. Rolling Stone wrote The Kickback "conjures the very best parts of The Veils and The Walkmen and The Killers, writing lean, nervy songs that snarl and snap."

== History ==
The group was formed as singer/guitarist Billy Yost's "first attempt to get a 'college band thing' going" at the University of South Dakota in Vermillion, South Dakota. The band name was chosen after Yost's readings on the Enron scandal while attending the university.

=== Early years ===
The Kickback was initially conceived as a three-piece band formed by Billy Yost during his freshman year at the University of South Dakota. His brother Danny joined on drums a year later along with Yost's bandmate Zach Verdoorn, and the trio would eventually relocate to Chicago in 2009 to pursue music together.

=== A clutch of EPs ===
After releasing "Great Self Love" in 2010 and "Mea Culpa Mea Culpa" in 2011, they received attention from Rolling Stone's Hype Monitor blog as well as Chicago music critic and Sound Opinions contributor Jim DeRogatis. Guitarist Jonny Ifergan joined the band around this time, the longest tenured musician in the group after Yost.

After years of prepping for their debut album, the band enlisted Spoon drummer and producer Jim Eno. The band tracked the record at Eno's Public Hi-Fi Studios in Austin, Texas, sleeping together in a friend's living room at night.

=== Sorry All Over the Place ===
The Kickback's debut LP was released September 18, 2015, on Jullian Records. It was recorded and produced by Jim Eno at his studio Public Hi-Fi in Austin, Texas. Consequence of Sound announced the album and premiered the track "White Lodge" on June 15, 2015. Grantland called the track "a witty, nervy, and melodic dagger that exudes dread without completely giving up on the possibility of transcendence." The Nerdist premiered the full album and said "[The Kickback's] extremely competent, catchy debut effort Sorry All Over the Place belies how nimbly the group is able to transition from ballad to Smashing Pumpkins-esque rock outbursts, to extended instrumental jams."

=== Weddings & Funerals ===
The Kickback's sophomore album, produced by Dennis Herring, was released on July 14, 2017. It was announced by Billboard and Consequence of Sound, along with a premiere of their new single "Will T" on May 12, 2017. Weddings & Funerals saw the introduction of bassist and multi-instrumentalist Daniel Leu to the band's lineup.

A demo from the album for the song "False Jeopardy" was used in the 2017 film To The Bone and quickly became the band's most-played song on streaming services.

=== Singles, Hit Piece ===
After the release of Weddings & Funerals, the band took an extended break. It was unclear if the band would reunite to make more music. However, the band reconvened in late 2019 and began working on a series of singles that were released from 2021-2023.

In 2023, the band teamed with Chicago-based producer and mixer Noam Wallenberg (Vulfpeck, A$AP Rocky, Mac Miller) to begin working on their third LP. It was the first time the band had recorded an album in their home city, having tracked their last two records in Austin, Texas and Los Angeles, respectively. The album, Hit Piece, was previewed with three singles: "Very Nice Time", "2005", and "Hot Car" in early 2025. The album was released on April 18, 2025.

=== Touring ===
The band has developed a reputation for their live performance. The Kickback have toured nationally on multiple occasions and are known for their energy and Yost's aggressive interaction with audiences. Bands they have supported previously include Bush, White Rabbits, Smith Westerns, Manic Street Preachers, Here We Go Magic, Tapes 'n Tapes, Telekinesis, Ringo Deathstarr, Miracle Legion, and The Districts. The band has performed at South by Southwest, North by Northeast, Canadian Music Week, 80/35, Summerfest, Mile of Music, CMJ, and others.

== Discography ==
=== Albums ===
- Sorry All Over the Place (2015, Jullian Records)
- Weddings & Funerals (2017, Jullian Records)
- Hit Piece (2025, BIG LIE Records)

=== EPs ===
- Great Self Love (2011, Spat!)
- Mea Culpa Mea Culpa (2011, Self)
- Kill Fee (2012, Self)

=== Singles ===
- "Alliteration, Etc." (CD, 2009, Spat!)
- "Please Hurt" (7"/Cassette, 2013, In Store Recordings)
- "When I Die" (Digital Single, 2014, Self)
