= Iowa's 34th House of Representatives district =

American legislative district

House District 34
- Type: District of the Lower house
- Location: Iowa
- Representative: Rob Johnson
- Parent organization: Iowa General Assembly

The 34th District of the Iowa House of Representatives in the state of Iowa is part of Polk County.

== Elected officials ==
Rob Johnson was elected in November 2024.

== Past representatives ==
The district has previously been represented by:

- Larry N. Larson, 1971–1973
- Stephen Rapp, 1973–1975
- M. Peter Middleton, 1975–1977
- Albert L. Garrison, 1977–1979
- Stephen Rapp, 1979–1983
- David M. Tabor, 1983–1991
- Rick Dickinson, 1991–1995
- Jerry E. Cornelius, 1995–1995
- Robert Osterhaus, 1995–2003
- Todd Taylor, 2003–2013
- Bruce Hunter, 2013–2023
- Ako Abdul-Samad, 2023–2025
- Rob Johnson, 2025–present
