= Albert Garrison =

American politician (1927–2004)

Member of the Iowa House of Representatives from the 34th district
- In office January 10, 1977 – January 7, 1979
- Preceded by: M. Peter Middleton
- Succeeded by: Stephen Rapp

Personal details
- Born: November 7, 1927 Waterloo, Iowa, US
- Died: April 3, 2004 (aged 76) Des Moines, Iowa, US
- Party: Democratic
- Education: Upper Iowa University; Drake University; Drake University School of Law

Albert L. Garrison Sr. (November 7, 1927 – April 3, 2004) was an American politician.

Albert Garrison was born in Waterloo, Iowa, on November 7, 1927, to parents Frank Garrison Sr. and Cora Rounds. He graduated from Waterloo East High School, and completed a bachelor of arts at Upper Iowa University, as well as a bachelor of science at Drake University.

Garrison served in the United States Navy from October 1945 to October 1947 and the United States Air Force Reserve, retiring with the rank of major. He worked for Massey Ferguson, Sperry Rand, and Waterloo Industries as an engineer before operating the eponymous Garrison Business Services. During his tenure on the Iowa House of Representatives, Garrison was a student of the Drake University School of Law. He held the District 34 seat from January 10, 1977, to January 7, 1979, as a Democrat. Garrison was appointed a Black Hawk County magistrate immediately after stepping down from the Iowa General Assembly. His eight-year career within the United States federal government included stints with the United States Department of Defense and the Internal Revenue Service. While affiliated with the IRS, Garrison was believed to be the first African-American tax agent for the state of Iowa. Garrison later chaired the Waterloo Housing Commission.

Garrison died on April 3, 2004, of a heart attack at Iowa Methodist Medical Center in Des Moines.
