= Todd F. Buchwald =

U.S. attorney and ambassador

5th United States Ambassador-at-Large for Global Criminal Justice
- In office December 30, 2015 – July 2017
- President: Barack Obama; Donald Trump
- Preceded by: Stephen Rapp
- Succeeded by: Morse Tan

Personal details
- Education: Cornell University (BA); Yale University (JD)

Todd F. Buchwald is an American attorney and legal scholar who served as the United States ambassador-at-large for global criminal justice from December 30, 2015, until July 2017. He replaced Stephen Rapp.

== Education ==
Buchwald earned a B.A. from Cornell University and a J.D. from Yale Law School.

== Career ==
Buchwald is a professorial lecturer in law at the George Washington University Law School. He previously served as a career lawyer in the Office of the Legal Adviser of the Department of State and as an attorney in the Office of White House Counsel. Buchwald was also an associate in the litigation and tax sections of the Washington law firm of Wilmer, Cutler and Pickering.

== Publications ==
- "The Crime of Aggression: the United States Perspective, 109 American Journal of International Law 257 (2015) (with Harold H. Koh)
- "Pre-emption, Iraq and International Law, 97 American Journal of International Law, 557 (2003) (with William H. Taft IV).
- U.S. Security Assistance and Related Programs, in J. N. Moore and R. F. Turner, National Security Law, 2d Edition (Carolina Academic Press 2005) (with Michael J. Matheson).
