= David M. Tabor =

American politician

Member of the Iowa House of Representatives from the 34th district
- In office January 10, 1983 – January 13, 1991
- Preceded by: Stephen Rapp
- Succeeded by: Rick Dickinson

Personal details
- Born: August 18, 1955 (age 71) Maquoketa, Iowa, US
- Party: Democratic
- Education: Iowa State University
- Occupation: farmer

David M. Tabor (born August 18, 1955) is an American politician.

David Tabor was born in Maquoketa, Iowa, on August 18, 1955, to Dennison Tabor and Barbara Dwigans. After graduating from Maquoketa Community High School in 1973 and earning a bachelor's of science degree from Iowa State University in 1977, Tabor began farming alongside his brother Brian. David Tabor was elected to four consecutive terms on the Iowa House of Representatives. He served continuously as a Democratic legislator for District 34 from January 10, 1983, to January 13, 1991.
