= Elizabeth Moen =

Singer-songwriter

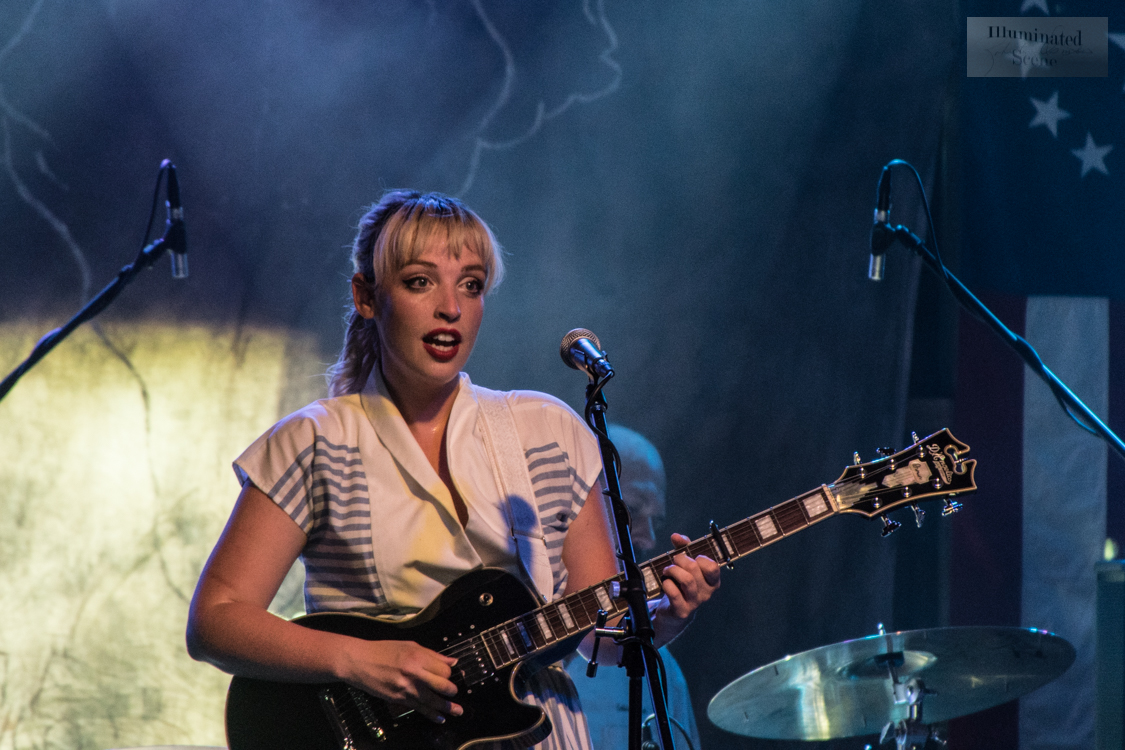
- Elizabeth Moen, July 4 2018

Background information
- Genres: Americana, Country, Folkrock, Alternative, Indie
- Occupation: Singer-songwriter
- Instruments: Vocalist, guitarist
- Website: https://elizabethmoen.com/

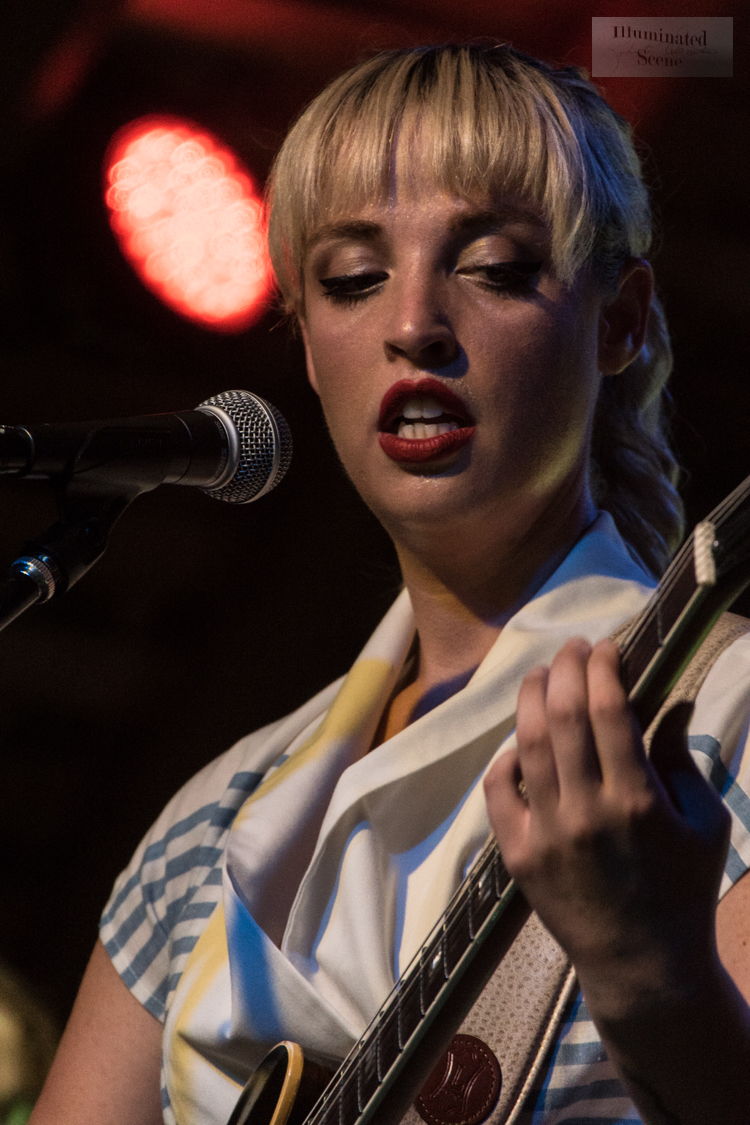
Elizabeth Moen in concert at Codfish Hollow, July 4, 2018

Elizabeth Moen is an American singer-songwriter based in Chicago, IL.

== Biography ==
Elizabeth Moen grew up in Iowa and taught herself how to play guitar as a teenager. She moved to Iowa City, IA for college where she studied French and Spanish at the University of Iowa. She played her first open mic at The Mill at age 20 and wrote her first original song at age 21. Elizabeth is currently based in Chicago.

Moen has had the opportunity to share the stage with Brittany Howard, Hozier, Allison Russell with Birds of Chicago, Lake Street Dive, Houndmouth, Ani DiFranco, St Paul and the Broken Bones, Lucy Dacus, Becca Mancari, Monica Martin, Esme Patterson, The Weepies, Buck Meek, Hurray for the Riff Raff, Margaret Glaspy, Lissie, William Elliott Whitmore, Violent Femmes, Jeremie Albino, and Beth Stelling. Performed as a guitarist for Squirrel Flower in 2021, and she was a vocalist for Kevin Morby’s 2022 tours.

Moen has recorded at Hyde Street Studios in San Francisco, Fame Studios in Muscle Shoals, Alabama, Hellfire Studios in Dublin, Ireland and Flat Black Studios in Lone Tree, Iowa.

Moen self-released a self-titled EP in 2016, a debut LP That's All I Wanted in 2017 and became a staple of the Iowa City music scene. Her sophomore album A Million Miles Away, released in 2018 drew praise from regional press as well as Paste Magazine.

In 2019, her recording of a new song "Headgear" for the Tiny Desk Contest drew praise from NPR Music. Listed as "one of the entries we can't stop watching."

Moen was accepted into the 2020 SXSW festival as an official showcase artist and featured in NPR Music's Austin 100. Moen has also appeared in several festivals including Hinterland, Lollapalooza (official after show), Mission Creek, Mile of Music, 80/35, Lincoln Calling, and KnockanStockan. She has also been invited to perform at The Ruby Sessions in Dublin, Ireland.

Moen has toured throughout the United States and Europe.

In the 2020 Democratic primary, she supported Bernie Sanders and was invited to play several of the Senator's rallies in Iowa.

Elizabeth has had several songs featured in television series and movies including the following: How it Ends, Candy Jar, Elsewhere, Roswell New Mexico (CW network), Tell Me a Story (CBS), and Shameless (Showtime).

== Musical style ==
Moen's sound and songwriting can be compared to Hozier and Bonnie Raitt. She counts Alabama Shakes, Sharon Van Etten, Stevie Nicks, Joni Mitchell among her musical influences. Her music frequently addresses mental health struggles. She is an open advocate for therapy.

== Discography ==
- Elizabeth Moen EP (2016)
- That's All I Wanted (2017)
- A Million Miles Away (2018)
- Creature of Habit EP (2020)
- ‘’Wherever You Aren’t’’ (2022)
- ‘’For Arthur’’ EP (2023)
- ‘’Live at Lincoln Hall (2024)
