= Unified Folk Theory =

Studio album by The Giving Tree Band
- Released: December 4, 2007
- Studio: Crooked Creek Studios
- Genres: Folk rock, singer-songwriter
- Length: 128:31
- Label: Crooked Creek Records
- Producer: E Fink

The Giving Tree Band chronology
Unified Folk Theory (2007)	Bring It Back Home For Christmas (2008)

Unified Folk Theory is the first studio album released by American folk rock/Americana band The Giving Tree Band, released on December 4, 2007, on Crooked Creek Records. In line with their environmental stewardship, the CD's were manufactured at Earthology Records and the band pledged to plant 10 trees for every 1000 Cd's sold. The album takes its name from the physics concept of the unified field theory.

== Track listing ==
=== Disc 1 ===
No.	Title	Writer(s)	Length
1.	"One Life at a Time"	Bob Salihar	3:24
2.	"Do It Well"	Bob Salihar	4:17
3.	"Sunshine Baby"	E Fink	4:35
4.	"West Coast"	Bob Salihar	2:54
5.	"Recess"	Todd Fink	5:50
6.	"Honey Bee"	Bob Salihar	3:36
7.	"Nothing At All"	Pat Burke	2:19
8.	"True Love"	Bob Salihar	4:07
9.	"How Can You Know"	E Fink	6:58
10.	"Room Full of Boxes"	Bob Salihar	3:47
11.	"Shadow Puppet"	E Fink	4:16
12.	"Alabama Road"	Bob Salihar	4:15
13.	"Oh My Mind"	Todd Fink	3:15
14.	"Focus On Change"	Bob Salihar	2:41
15.	"All My Life"	E Fink	4:22
16.	"Crooked Creek Crawl"	E Fink & Pat Burke	4:21
17.	"Don't Say Goodbye"	Bob Salihar	4:01

=== Disc 2 ===
No.	Title	Writer(s)	Length
1.	"Wild Girl"	Bob Salihar	1:42
2.	"Complete"	Bob Salihar	3:41
3.	"Guardian Angel"	Pat Burke	2:15
4.	"Riddle Of Love"	Bob Salihar	3:53
5.	"Hit The Road"	Bob Salihar	2:24
6.	"Idle Company"	E Fink	4:23
7.	"Where Am I?"	E Fink	5:00
8.	"That Don't Make It Easier"	Bob Salihar	3:31
9.	"Ever Since the Day"	Bob Salihar	2:59
10.	"Lonesome Road"	E Fink	5:01
11.	"Reflections"	E Fink	4:35
12.	"Soul Bird"	Todd Fink	3:22
13.	"Wheel Man"	E Fink	4:48
14.	"Freedom"	Bob Salihar	4:11
15.	"Nada Yajna"	Todd Fink	3:28
16.	"Blessed Are the Peacemakers"	E Fink & Todd Fink	4:53

== Personnel ==
- Bob Salihar – vocals, acoustic guitar, dobro, harmonica
- E Fink – vocals, upright bass, fret-less acoustic bass, dulcimer, piano, penny whistle, ukulele, tambura, Tibetan chime
- Todd Fink – vocals, acoustic guitar, classical guitar, banjitar, tambourine
- Pat Burke – vocals, acoustic guitar, dobro, mandolin, cello

Additional personnel

- E Fink – engineering, mixing engineer, producer, mastering engineer
- Elisabeth Blair – vocals – "Don't Say Goodbye", "That Don't Make It Easier"
- Sheela Chandrasekhara – vocals – "Oh My Mind"
- Ana Klimiuk – Artwork, Layout, and Design
