= John Clint Williamson =

American ambassador

John C. Williamson
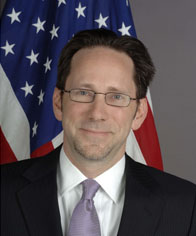

3rd United States Ambassador-at-Large for War Crimes Issues
- In office June 29, 2006 – September 7, 2009
- President: George W. Bush; Barack Obama
- Preceded by: Pierre-Richard Prosper
- Succeeded by: Stephen J. Rapp

Personal details
- Born: John Clint Williamson; August 8, 1961 (age 65) Ruston, Louisiana, U.S.
- Education: Louisiana Tech University (BA); Tulane University (JD)

John Clint Williamson (born August 8, 1961) is an American diplomat, lawyer, and educator who has served in a variety of senior-level roles with the United States Government, the United Nations, and the European Union. He currently serves as the Senior Director for International Justice at Georgetown University, on a joint appointment between the Law Center and the Department of Government. Ambassador Williamson heads the US Department of State-funded project at Georgetown that provides support to the Ukrainian government in its investigation and prosecution of crimes arising from the current conflict. He is the Lead Coordinator of the Atrocity Crimes Advisory Group (ACA), the agreed trans-Atlantic community mechanism for addressing atrocity crimes in Ukraine. In this capacity he coordinates, on behalf of the EU, UK and US governments, the work of the five implementing entities that comprise ACA.

== Biography ==
Ambassador Williamson was born in Ruston, Louisiana. He holds a bachelor's degree from Louisiana Tech University and a J.D. degree from Tulane University Law School.

Williamson served as a Trial Attorney in the U.S. Department of Justice Organized Crime Section and as an Assistant District Attorney in New Orleans, Louisiana.

From 1994 to 2001, he worked as a Trial Attorney at the International Criminal Tribunal for the former Yugoslavia (ICTY) in The Hague, Netherlands. While at the ICTY, he supervised investigations and field operations in the Balkans, compiled indictments, and prosecuted cases at trial. Among the cases handled by Ambassador Williamson were those against Slobodan Milosevic and the notorious paramilitary leader Zeljko Raznatovic, a.k.a. "Arkan," as well as cases arising from the Yugoslav Army attacks on Vukovar and Dubrovnik. He also planned and supervised execution of the first arrest operation of an indicted war criminal by international peacekeeping forces, resulting in the capture of Slavko Dokmanovic by UN forces in Eastern Slavonia.

From late-2001 through 2002, Williamson served in the UN Department of Peacekeeping Operations as the Director of the Department of Justice in the United Nations Mission in Kosovo (UNMIK), during the period when the UN retained executive authority over justice and police matters. In his role as the functional minister of justice, he supervised the court system, the prosecutorial service, the missing persons and forensics departments and the prison system.

Williamson served as the Special Assistant to the President George W. Bush and Senior Director for Relief, Stabilization, and Development at the National Security Council (NSC). From 2003 to 2004 he served as Director for Trans-National Threats in the Counter-Terrorism Directorate, and from 2004 to 2005, he served as the Director for Stability Operations on the NSC staff in the Defense Policy Directorate. During his tenure at the White House, he was instrumental in developing the proposal for creation of a standing U.S. Government post-conflict response capability, which was realized with the establishment of the Office of the Coordinator for Reconstruction and Stabilization (now the Bureau of Conflict and Stabilization Operations) in the State Department in mid-2004.

While with the NSC, Ambassador Williamson served a rotation in Baghdad, Iraq, from April–August 2003 as the first Senior Adviser to the Iraqi Ministry of Justice. In this capacity, he was responsible for re-instituting judicial operations and ministry functions in the aftermath of the U.S. invasion and for managing the ministry until appointment of an interim Iraqi minister in July 2003.

From his confirmation by the U.S. Senate in June 2006 until September 2009, he served as the United States Ambassador-at-Large for War Crimes Issues, with the rank of an Assistant Secretary of State. In this capacity, he coordinated U.S. Government efforts to further accountability for serious violations of international humanitarian law throughout the world and led U.S. Government efforts to prevent and respond to mass atrocities. He was the third person to hold this title.

From June 2010 to September 2011, Ambassador Williamson served as a Special Expert to the Secretary-General of the United Nations, focused primarily on the Extraordinary Chambers in the Courts of Cambodia.

In October 2011, he was appointed to serve as the European Union's Special Prosecutor, examining allegations of war crimes committed by Kosovo Albanians during and in the aftermath of the 1999 war in Kosovo. The most prominent charges involved allegations that individuals associated with the Kosovo Liberation Army (KLA) murdered Serb prisoners for the purpose of harvesting and trafficking their bodily organs. As Special Prosecutor, he headed the multi-national EU Special Investigative Task Force (SITF) which has responsibility for conducting this investigation and bringing any prosecutions that are warranted.

On 29 July 2014, in Brussels, he announced SITF's investigative findings. In this statement, he indicated that "certain senior officials of the former KLA bear responsibility for a campaign of persecution that was directed at the ethnic Serb, Roma, and other minority populations of Kosovo and toward fellow Kosovo Albanians whom they labeled as political opponents." He went on to say that these acts of persecution effectively resulted in the ethnic cleansing of large portions of the Serb and Roma populations from Kosovo and that these crimes were not the acts of rogue individuals acting on their own accord, but rather that they were conducted in an organized fashion and were sanctioned by the KLA leadership. He added that the widespread or systematic nature of these crimes justifies a prosecution for crimes against humanity. As to the organ trafficking allegations, he said that "there are compelling indications that this practice did occur on a very limited scale and that a small number of individuals were killed for the purpose of extracting and trafficking their organs." He stated that SITF's findings were largely consistent with those in the Marty Report, but that the investigation had not yet secured a level of evidence sufficient to charge those crimes. He concluded by saying that this aspect of the investigation was still ongoing, and that SITF would continue to vigorously pursue these allegations.

Upon his retirement from the U.S. Department of State in September 2014, Ambassador Williamson joined the faculty of the Sandra Day O'Connor College of Law at Arizona State University, where he served as a Distinguished Professor of Practice and as Senior Director for International Rule of Law and Security at the university's McCain Institute for International Leadership, based in Washington, DC. In September 2022, he left Arizona State to take up his current appointment at Georgetown University.

In January 2017, Williamson was appointed as the Presiding Arbitrator of the Arbitral Tribunal for Dispute over the Inter-Entity Boundary in Brčko Area by International Court of Justice President Ronny Abraham, following the death of former Presiding Arbitrator Roberts Bishop Owen.

Diplomatic posts
Preceded by Pierre-Richard Prosper	United States Ambassador-at-Large for War Crimes Issues; June 2006 – September 2009	Succeeded by Stephen J. Rapp
