= Rick Dickinson (politician) =

American politician (born 1953)

Member of the Iowa House of Representatives from the 34th district
- In office January 14, 1991 – January 8, 1995
- Preceded by: David M. Tabor
- Succeeded by: Jerry E. Cornelius

Personal details
- Born: August 29, 1953 (age 72) Sabula, Iowa, U.S.
- Party: Democratic
- Spouse: Rae Ann
- Children: 2
- Education: William Penn College
- Occupation: Politician, business leader

Rick Dickinson (born August 29, 1953) is an American politician and business leader.

Dickinson was born in Sabula, Iowa, on August 29, 1953. He earned a degree in history and business administration at William Penn College. He then worked for H.B. Fuller as a national accounts manager, as a manager of the American market for Franklin International, and senior sales representative for Borden Chemical.

Dickinson has served as an adult probation officer within Seventh Judicial District Correctional Services. Politically, he is affiliated with the Democratic Party, and has been treasurer of the Jackson County branch of the Iowa Democratic Party, as well as co-chair of the Jackson County Democratic Central Committee. Prior to serving on the Iowa House of Representatives for District 34 between January 14, 1991, and January 8, 1995, Dickinson was a member of the Jackson County board of supervisors, and mayor and city council member in his hometown of Sabula.

Since 1995, Dickinson has been President and CEO of Greater Dubuque Development Corporation. Under his tenure, the economy of Dubuque, Iowa, once dominated by manufacturing, has diversified, including growth in tourism. In July 2024, Dickinson announced his intention to step down from the role at the end of 2025.
