= Office of Global Criminal Justice =

US Department of State office

- Seal of the Department of State

Office overview
- Formed: 1997
- Preceding Office: Office of War Crimes Issues
- Dissolved: 2025
- Jurisdiction: Executive branch of the United States
- Parent department: U.S. Department of State
- Parent Under Secretary: Under Secretary for Civilian Security, Democracy, and Human Rights
- Website: www.state.gov/bureaus-offices/under-secretary-for-civilian-security-democracy-and-human-rights/office-of-global-criminal-justice/

The Office of Global Criminal Justice (J/GCJ), formerly called the Office of War Crimes Issues (S/WCI), was an office within the United States Department of State. It was abolished in 2025.

== Duties ==
The Office was headed by an ambassador who advised the secretary of state and the under secretary of state for civilian security, human rights, and democracy and works to formulate U.S. policy on prevention and accountability for mass atrocities.

The Office coordinated U.S. government support for ad hoc and international courts currently trying persons accused of genocide, war crimes, and crimes against humanity committed (among other places) in the former Yugoslavia, Rwanda, Sierra Leone, and Cambodia, and helped bolster the capacity of domestic judicial systems to try atrocity crimes. It also worked closely with other governments, international institutions, and non-governmental organizations to establish and assisted international and domestic commissions, courts, and tribunals to investigate, judge, and deter atrocity crimes in every region of the globe. The ambassador coordinated the deployment of a range of diplomatic, legal, economic, military, and intelligence tools to help expose the truth, judge those responsible, protect and assist victims, enable reconciliation, and build the rule of law.

== Last developments ==
Previous Ambassadors at Large in the Office of Global Criminal Justice included Todd F. Buchwald, Morse H. Tan, and Beth Van Schaack.

According to reports in Foreign Policy, Secretary of State Rex Tillerson had intended to close the Office and fold its personnel into the Bureau of Democracy, Human Rights, and Labor. In an August 28, 2017 letter to Senator Bob Corker, Secretary Tillerson informed the Chairman of the United States Senate Committee on Foreign Relations that he intended to end or transfer as many as three dozen special envoy positions. The letter provided, however, that the Office of Global Criminal Justice, along with the Bureau of Counterterrorism and the office of the Office to Monitor and Combat Trafficking in Persons, "will be retained and continue to be organized under the Office of the Under Secretary of State for Civilian Security, Democracy, and Human Rights."

The Office of Global Criminal Justice was abolished in early 2025 and some of its former functions were transferred to other offices in the State Department.
