= M. Peter Middleton =

American politician (born 1946)

Member of the Iowa House of Representatives from the 34th district
- In office January 13, 1975 – January 9, 1977
- Preceded by: Stephen Rapp
- Succeeded by: Albert L. Garrison

Personal details
- Born: April 17, 1946 Cardiff, Wales
- Party: Democratic
- Education: Rochester State Junior College; Morningside College; University of Iowa College of Law

M. Peter Middleton (born April 17, 1946) is a British-born American politician.

== Early life and career ==
Born in Cardiff, Wales, on April 17, 1946, Middleton graduated from Waterloo East High School in 1964. He successively earned an Associate of Arts from Rochester State Junior College in 1966, a Bachelor of Science from Morningside College in 1968, and a Juris Doctor degree from the University of Iowa College of Law in 1974. While attending Morningside, Middleton was a wrestler and named a National Association of Intercollegiate Athletics wrestling team All-American in 1967.

Middleton worked as an administrative assistant for the Black Hawk County Attorney's Office and a corporate personnel assistant at Rath Packing Company. He also taught at Luther College and was executive director of the Waterloo Human Rights Commission before serving on the Iowa House of Representatives for District 34 from January 13, 1975, to January 8, 1977, as a Democrat.
