= Maxilla Blue =

American hip hop group

- Origin: Des Moines, Iowa
- Genres: Hip hop
- Years active: 2006–present
- Labels: Central Standard/ Galapagos4
- Members: Aeon Grey; Asphate Woodhavet; Dj TouchNice
- Website: Maxillablue.com

Maxilla Blue is an American hip-hop trio based out of Des Moines, Iowa, formed in 2006, consisting of the Emcee Ashphate Woodhavet, Turntablist, DJ TouchNice, and producer Aeon Grey.

== Career ==
Their eponymous debut album was released on May 6, 2008, by Central Standard Records, a lowa underground label co-founded by Aeon Grey. This album established their style of using minimal vocals, providing an overall presentation of an instrumental and poetically commentated piece. Through tour work, the group has appeared live in the Midwest, Mountain, West Coast, Southwestern U.S regions, Germany, and France.

Vol. 2 was released on June 15, 2010, and was also on Central Standard Records. This marked the first edition of the ongoing series to be presented to the public as a vinyl LP, compact disc, and digital format.

Vol. 3's retail release date of February 28, 2012, marked the 5th collaborative work from the trio and the 3rd of the self-titled series. It was completed as a split release between Central Standard Records and Galapagos4. Joining the likes of Qwel & Maker, Typical Cats, Qwazaar, Batsauce, and various other underground rap and hip-hop production veterans, Maxilla's most recent work is again presented in the three formats mentioned above.

== Musical Contributions and Style ==
The vocal pieces are known for the dynamic use of voice and often esoteric wordplay unique to the track paired with it, at times giving the impression of multiple vocalists. However, all vocals, production, and Turntablism have been exclusively provided by the trio. Members of the group have noted no intention of altering this trend, publicly stating that it is unnecessary to feature external components to create their sound. Each member has, however, participated in numerous side-works with other artists to create pieces under various titles. As the approach and presentation have remained intact, each subsequent release has carried the self-titled attribute, distinguished only by the numbered volume. The trio has said that were it not for the necessity of differentiating the releases from each other for distributive purposes, they would have released each record simply as "Maxilla Blue," leaving the familiar listener and general consumers to differentiate the body of work.

== Recognition and Awards ==
- 2011 Cedar Rapids Independent Film Festival Gold Eddy for The Shovel Kids music video directed and edited by Carlos De León.
- Des Moines Register 2010 Mixies Award Hip-Hop Cartographers (for putting Iowa Hip-Hop on the map).
- 2010 Zzz Records' Best-selling local album of the year.

== Discography ==
=== Albums ===
- 2008: Maxilla Blue
- 2009: BumRap: Underpass Logic (Also ft. prod from Bashir)
- 2010: Maxilla Blue Vol. 2
- 2011: BumRap: Median Risers (Also ft. prod from Bashir & The Shovel Kids)
- 2012: Maxilla Blue Vol. 3
