= Pierre-Richard Prosper =

American lawyer, diplomat and former prosecutor for the ICTR

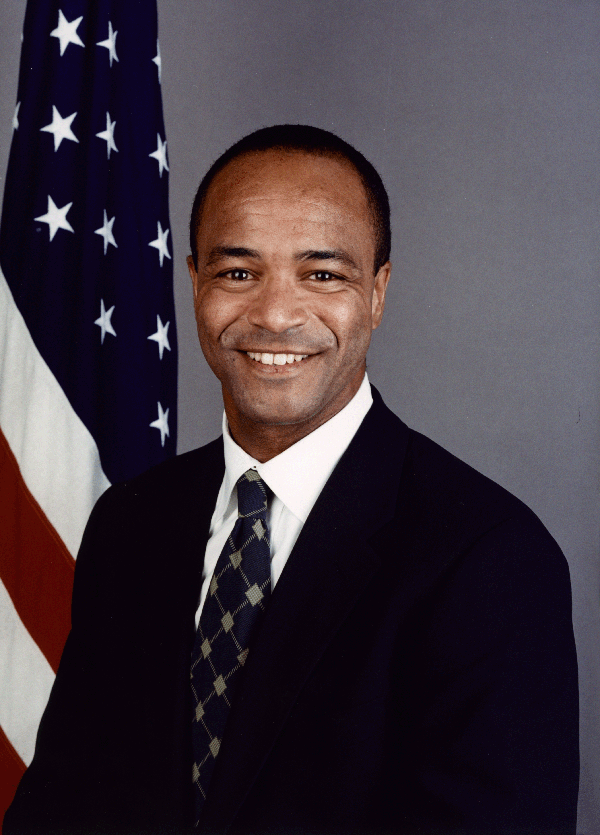

2nd United States Ambassador-at-Large for War Crimes Issues
- In office July 13, 2001 – October 12, 2005
- Appointed by: George W. Bush
- Preceded by: David Scheffer
- Succeeded by: John C. Williamson

Personal details
- Born: September 19, 1963 (age 62) Denver, Colorado, U.S.
- Education: Boston College (BA); Pepperdine University (JD)

Pierre-Richard Prosper (born September 19, 1963) is an American lawyer, prosecutor and former government official. He served as the second United States Ambassador-at-Large for War Crimes Issues under President George W. Bush from 2001 to 2005.

== Early life and education ==
Prosper was born in Denver, Colorado, to two physicians who emigrated from Haiti. He was raised in Upstate New York, where he graduated from Shenendehowa High School in Clifton Park, New York. He obtained an undergraduate degree from Boston College and a Juris Doctor degree from Pepperdine University School of Law.

== Career ==
Prosper was a Deputy District Attorney for Los Angeles County, California from 1989 to 1994. His last two years in this position were spent in the Hardcore Gang Division of the Bureau of Special Operations, where he prosecuted gang-related murders. From 1994 to 1996, he was an Assistant United States Attorney for the Central District of California in Los Angeles. He was assigned to the Narcotics Section, Drug Enforcement Task Force, where he investigated and prosecuted major international drug cartels.

From 1996 to late 1998, Prosper served as a war crimes prosecutor for the United Nations International Criminal Tribunal for Rwanda. He was appointed lead trial attorney and prosecuted Prosecutor vs. Jean-Paul Akayesu, the first-ever case of genocide under the 1948 Convention on the Prevention and Punishment of the Crime of Genocide. In the 14-month trial, he won additional life-sentence convictions for crimes against humanity and broke new ground in international law by convincing the Tribunal to recognize rape committed in time of conflict as an act of genocide and a crime against humanity. Prosper recounts the trial in the 2015 documentary film, The Uncondemned.

Prosper served as a career prosecutor at the U.S. Department of Justice where he was Special Assistant to the Assistant Attorney General for the Criminal Division in 1999. From 1999 to 2001, Prosper was detailed to the State Department where he served as the Special Counsel and Policy Adviser to the previous Ambassador-at-Large for War Crimes Issues.

Prosper was nominated by President George W. Bush on May 16, 2001 to become the second U.S. Ambassador-at-Large for War Crimes Issues. He was confirmed by the United States Senate, and sworn in on July 13, 2001, and served until late 2005.

As the President's envoy and senior diplomat, Prosper traveled worldwide conducting diplomatic negotiations and consultations with heads of state, foreign ministers, and senior government officials from over 60 different countries. He also engaged foreign parliaments and multilateral and international organizations to build support for U.S. policies. He regularly visited conflict zones in efforts to secure peace, stability, and the rule of law. In this capacity, Prosper formulated and coordinated U.S. government policy responses to atrocities and attacks against civilians throughout the world. He reported to U.S. Secretaries of State Colin Powell and Condoleezza Rice and advised the President of the United States, Secretary of Defense, Attorney General, National Security Advisor, Chairman of the Joint Chiefs of Staff, Director of the Central Intelligence Agency, White House Counsel, and other senior U.S. government officials.

After the September 11 attacks, Prosper played a role in developing policy to confront terrorism. He was also the chief US negotiator and lead diplomat responsible for engaging nations regarding their nationals held in Guantanamo Bay, Cuba and captured by US forces in combat. From 2008-2012, Ambassador Prosper was elected to the United Nations' Committee on the Elimination of Racial Discrimination, where he served as Vice-Chairman for the last two years of his service.

Currently, Prosper holds the position of Partner in the Los Angeles office of ArentFox Schiff LLP, where he has handled several high-profile cases. These include advising and representing the Democratic Republic of Timor-Leste on matters related to the Petroleum sector, investment and infrastructure development; successfully negotiated the release of an American citizen detained in the Islamic Republic of Iran through repeated travels to Iran and engagement with senior Iranian officials; and advises and represents the government of Rwanda on a range of matters including international arbitration, litigation, and contract negotiation, among others. Prosper also serves as a trustee on the Boston College Board of Trustees.

In September 2013, he became a member of the International Centre for Settlement of Investment Disputes (ICSID) Panel of Arbitrators and of Conciliators, where he will be asked by disputing parties or by the ICSID to serve on conciliation commissions seeking to resolve international investment disputes commenced under the ICSID Convention or the ICSID Additional Facility Rules.

In September 2018, Prosper was appointed to the Pepperdine University School of Law Board of Trustees.

Sometime between October 2018 and May 2019, Chinese video surveillance company Hikvision retained Prosper to advise the company regarding human rights compliance according to an emailed statement from a Hikvision spokesman. Hikvision cameras were used in Uyghur internment camps.
