= Ako Abdul-Samad =

American politician (born 1951)

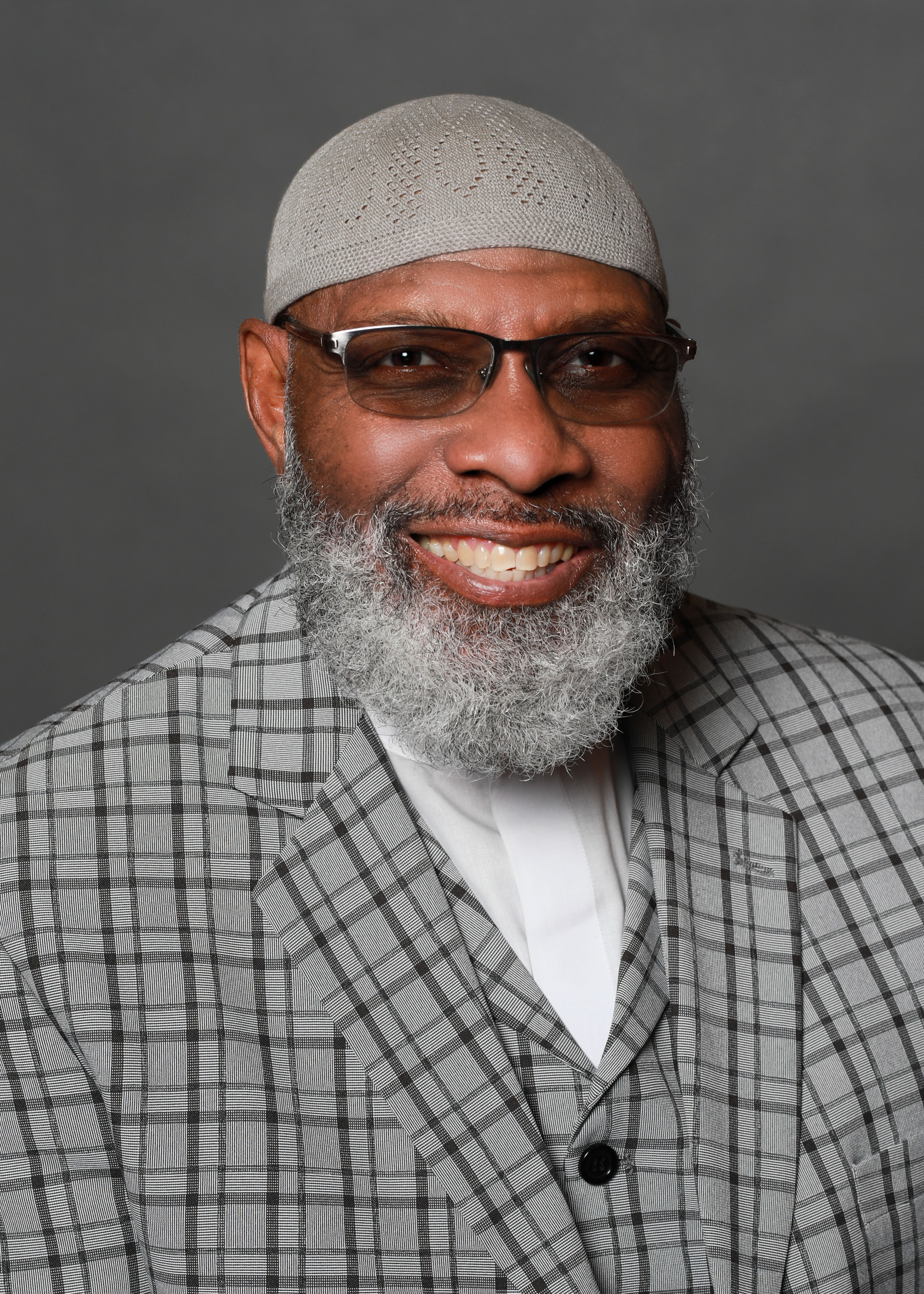
- Abdul-Samad in 2021

Member of the Iowa House of Representatives from the 34th district
- In office January 8, 2007 – January 12, 2025
- Preceded by: Ed Fallon
- Succeeded by: Rob Johnson

Personal details
- Born: July 25, 1951 (age 75) Des Moines, Iowa, U.S.
- Party: Democratic
- Occupation: CEO of Creative Visions
- Website: legis.iowa.gov/...

Ako Abdul-Samad (born July 25, 1951) is a retired American politician. He served in the Iowa House of Representatives from 2007 to 2025. Previously, he was a member of the Des Moines school board.

== Early life and education ==
Ako Abdul-Samad was born on July 25, 1951, in Des Moines, Iowa. He was raised in the city by a single mother. As a teenager, he became involved in the Black Panther Party, but left Des Moines after the party's headquarters in the city were bombed in 1969.

Abdul-Samad worked various jobs in the early 1970s, including a stint as an attendant aboard the Delta Queen. He converted to Islam around this time. He returned to Des Moines in 1975 and attended Des Moines Area Community College.

== Career ==
In 1996, Abdul-Samad founded the Creative Visions Human Development Institute, a nonprofit organization that provides educational programs for at-risk youth.

In 2003, Abdul-Samad was elected to the Des Moines School Board, and served one term. In 2006, he was elected to represent district 35 of the Iowa House of Representatives, which serves parts of Des Moines. He was reelected in 2008, 2010, 2012, 2014, 2016, 2018, 2020, and 2022. In 2024, he announced that he would retire at the end of his term and declined to seek re-election.

Abdul-Samad served on various committees throughout his legislative career, including the House Administration and Rules, Education, Human Resources, and Public Safety committees. He also served on the Health and Human Services Committee of the Midwestern Legislative Conference of the Council of State Governments. During the legislative session of 2017, he voted against cutting $70.1 million from the Department for the Blind, the College Student Aid Commission, the Department of Education, and the Board of Regents.

Abdul-Samad has served as chairman of the American Muslim Alliance and the Iowa Democratic Black Caucus. He also founded the African-American Islamic Association and co-founded the first black student union in Iowa.

== Personal life ==
Abdul-Samad continues to reside in Des Moines. His only child, Ako White Abdul-Samad, was shot and killed at the age of 20 in 1997.

Abdul-Samad is a published author, having written the book The Deeper Truth: Revelations of the Soul in 2004.

== Electoral history ==
*incumbent

Election	Political result	Candidate	Party	Votes	%
Iowa House of Representatives primary elections, 2006; District 66; Turnout: 1,625	Democratic	Ako Abdul-Samad	Democratic	856	52.68%
Iowa House of Representatives primary elections, 2006; District 66; Turnout: 1,625	Democratic	Frank E. Affannato	Democratic	332	20.43%
Iowa House of Representatives primary elections, 2006; District 66; Turnout: 1,625	Democratic	Tre Wilson	Democratic	212	13.05%
Iowa House of Representatives primary elections, 2006; District 66; Turnout: 1,625	Democratic	Paul Lay	Democratic	210	12.92%
Iowa House of Representatives general elections, 2006; District 66; Turnout: 5,672	Democratic hold	Ako Abdul-Samad	Democratic	3,459	60.98%
Iowa House of Representatives general elections, 2006; District 66; Turnout: 5,672	Democratic hold	Jack Whitver	Republican	1,566	27.61%
Iowa House of Representatives general elections, 2006; District 66; Turnout: 5,672	Democratic hold	Jeff Johannsen	Independent	398	7.02%
Iowa House of Representatives general elections, 2006; District 66; Turnout: 5,672	Democratic hold	Brett Blanchfield	Libertarian	225	3.97%
Iowa House of Representatives primary elections, 2008; District 66	Democratic	Ako Abdul-Samad*	Democratic	unopposed	
Iowa House of Representatives general elections, 2008; District 66; Turnout: 10,303	Democratic hold	Ako Abdul-Samad*	Democratic	6,734	65.36%
Iowa House of Representatives general elections, 2008; District 66; Turnout: 10,303	Democratic hold	Chris Moeller	Iowa Green Party	1,889	18.33%
Iowa House of Representatives primary elections, 2010; District 66; Turnout: 1,304	Democratic	Ako Abdul-Samad*	Democratic	912	69.94%
Iowa House of Representatives primary elections, 2010; District 66; Turnout: 1,304	Democratic	Clair E. Rudison, Jr.	Democratic	306	23.47%
Iowa House of Representatives general elections, 2010; District 66	Democratic hold	Ako Abdul-Samad*	Democratic	unopposed	
Iowa House of Representatives primary elections, 2012; District 35	Democratic	Ako Abdul-Samad*	Democratic	unopposed	
Iowa House of Representatives general elections, 2012; District 35; Turnout: 10,889	Democratic (newly redistricted)	Ako Abdul-Samad*	Democratic	7,508	68.95%
Iowa House of Representatives general elections, 2012; District 35; Turnout: 10,889	Democratic (newly redistricted)	Terrance Williams	Republican	2,727	25.04%

Iowa House of Representatives
Preceded by Ed Fallon	66th District; 2007–2013	Succeeded by Art Staed
Preceded by Kraig Paulsen	35th District; 2013–2023	Succeeded by Sean Bagniewski
Preceded by Bruce Hunter	35th District; 2023–2025	Succeeded by Rob Johnson
