= Pachyman =

Puerto Rican singer, songwriter, and musician

- Born: Pachy García; San Juan, Puerto Rico
- Genres: Dub reggae
- Years active: 2019–present
- Labels: ATO Records, Mock Records, Permanent Records
- Website: pachyman.com

Pachy García, known by the stage name Pachyman, is a Puerto Rican singer, songwriter, and musician. Since 2019, Pachyman has released five albums of predominantly dub reggae, most recently Another Place in 2025.

== History ==
García was born in San Juan, Puerto Rico. García told NPR that he became interested in reggae while growing up in Puerto Rico, hearing it played by local bands, and that he was particularly interested in dub reggae because of the way it forefronts the recording engineer as an artist. Initially his biggest stylistic influence was Channel One Studios and their house band the Revolutionaries.

García moved to Los Angeles in 2012. In Los Angeles he set up a studio in his basement, where recorded his first album as Pachyman, called In Dub, which was released by Permanent Records in 2019. García said the album was inspired by the classic dub album King Tubbys Meets Rockers Uptown. His second album At 333 House was released on Mock Records in 2020.

In 2021 Pachyman released his third album The Return of... on ATO Records. NPR included the album on their list of the "Best Latin Music of 2021", and Stephen Kallao of World Cafe called it "a 21st century take on the classic dub foundation." The album was nominated for the "Best World Record" category at the 2022 Libera Awards.

Pachyman's fourth album Switched-On was released by ATO Records in September 2023. Paul Simpson of AllMusic described Switched-On as "a vivid hybrid of ear-catching sounds and uplifting melodies", and rated it 4/5 stars. The album was nominated for the category of "Best Global Record" at the 2024 Libera Awards. In 2025, Pachyman released his fifth album Another Place on ATO.

== Discography ==
=== Albums ===
- In Dub (2019, Permanent Records)
- At 333 House (2020, Mock Records)
- The Return of... (2021, ATO Records)
- Switched-On (2023, ATO)
- Another Place (2025, ATO)

=== Extended Plays ===
- At The Control (2020, Mock)
- El Sonido Nuevo de (2022, ATO)
