= The Giving Tree Band =

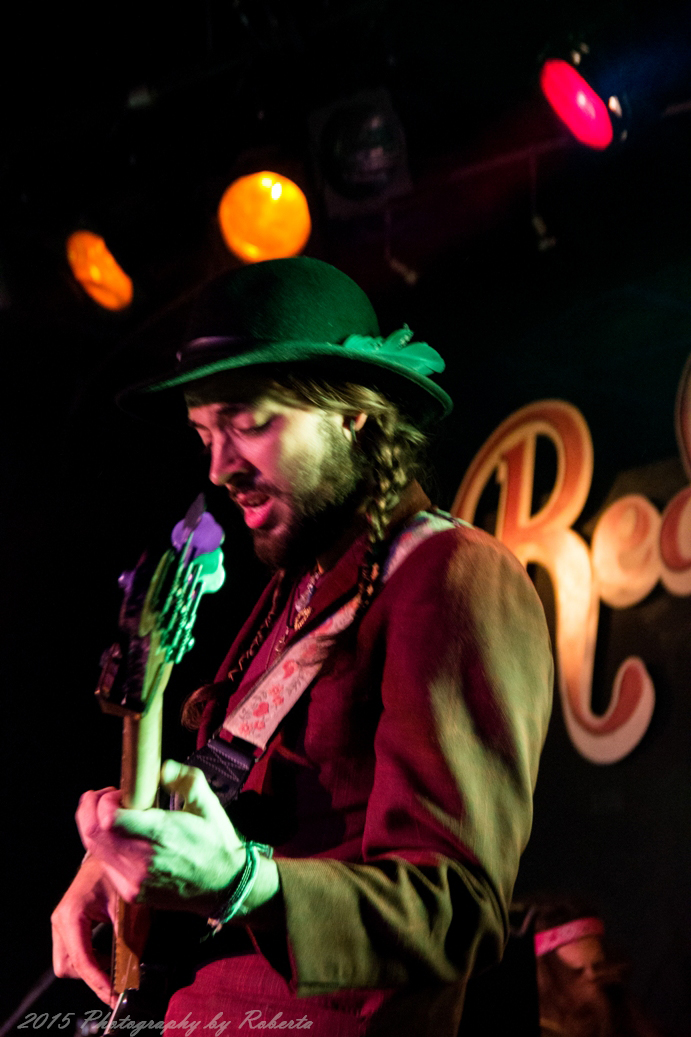
- The Giving Tree Band in Davenport, IA at the Redstone Room, July 2016

Background information
- Origin: Chicago, Illinois, United States
- Genres: Americana; indie folk; alternative country
- Years active: 2004 - present
- Label: Crooked Creek Records
- Members: E Fink; Todd Fink; Norm; Z Charlie Karls
- Past members: Patrick Burke 2004-2011; Justin Forsythe 2010-2011; Andy Goss 2009-2011; Philip Roach 2009 -2013; Woody Woods 2009 -2013
- Website: TheGivingTreeBand

The Giving Tree Band is a rock & roll band from Yorkville, Illinois. The band is known for their live shows, which cover a vast array of genres. The current lineup consists of brothers Eric "E" (Guitars/Lead Vocals) and Todd Fink (Banjos/Guitars/Lead Vocals), Karl "Charlie Karls" Kieser (Bass/Vocals), Zachariah "Z" Oostema (Percussion/Vocals), and Erik "Norm" Norman (Keys/Mandolin/Guitars/Vocals) who is recognized for adding elaborate solos. Though the group uses an instrumentation largely associated with bluegrass and Americana, their sound often drums up comparisons to such classic rock icons as The Band, Neil Young, Bob Dylan, Crosby, Stills, and Nash, and The Beatles.

== History ==
The Giving Tree Band was started by brothers Todd and Eric Fink in 2004. They released their first full-length album - a double disc, entitled Unified Folk Theory - in 2007. The album features 33 songs of original material. In 2008, the band set out to record a carbon-neutral album, which was done at the Aldo Leopold Legacy Center in Baraboo, Wisconsin. The album was released in 2009, and was entitled Great Possessions, which was the working title of conservationist Aldo Leopold's book, A Sand County Almanac. It was recorded with 100% solar energy at the Aldo Leopold Legacy Center in Baraboo, WI.

On September 21, 2010, the band released their third full-length album, The Joke, The Threat & The Obvious. The album spent multiple weeks on various Americana radio charts, peaking at number 15 on the Roots Music Report and number 40 on the Americana Airplay Chart. The album also received critical acclaim, including a spot on Acoustic Guitar Magazine's "Best Acoustic Albums of 2010" list, as well as garnering positive reviews from such publications as Relix Magazine, The Huffington Post, and American Songwriter.

The group toured extensively in 2010, playing such notable festivals as South by Southwest, Wakarusa, the Philadelphia Folk Festival, and Forecastle Festival, along with such venues as The Kennedy Center in Washington, D.C. and Millennium Park and the House of Blues in Chicago. When not touring, the band members all live together at a house in Yorkville, where they also record their albums.

== Instrumentation and sound ==
The band uses a multitude of acoustic instruments, including guitar, banjo, upright bass, violin, mandolin, slide guitar, and drums. During their November 3, 2008 appearance on WoodSongs Old-Time Radio Hour, host Michael Johnathon described them as having "the spirit of Pete Seeger with the musical abilities of The Band." Reviewers have referred to their songwriting as having "Dylanesque imagery, John Prine-like aphorisms and Abbey Road-era Beatles overtones" and being "reminiscent of Bob Dylan and Neil Young". A review from the Nashville Metromix described The Giving Tree Band as being "a neo-retro take on The Band or the American answer to Mumford & Sons".

They're known to dress in costumes and perform sets as a range of classic acts around Halloween each year. On October 28, 2016, at a costume party at The Law Office Pub & Music Hall in The Giving Tree Band's hometown of Yorkville, they dressed and performed an entire set as The Band.

== Environmental initiatives ==
The Giving Tree Band is also known for its great environmental stewardship and eco-friendly music production. They use a number of instruments that were handmade from naturally fallen trees and reclaimed woods. By 2010, all members of the band were vegetarians. They have recorded with renewable energy and package all their CDs with 100% recycled materials. During the recording session of the 2009 album Great Possessions, the band camped in a nearby state park and commuted over 500 miles by bicycle. As a result of this, the Chicago Sun-Times called it the "greenest of albums." National and international environmental media, such as The Sierra Club, The Discovery Channel and Mother Earth News, have also highlighted the band's activism, with the latter referring to them as "the greenest band in the land".

Following the release of Great Possessions, the band began receiving international recognition, as news sources in countries as diverse as Mexico, France, Kuwait, Lebanon, Egypt, China, and Ecuador reported on the making of the album and the band's other environmental initiatives. These international sources put the group's environmental efforts as being on par with those of popular rock artists Radiohead and Kings of Leon.

In 2016, the group appeared on a compilation album entitled Home on the Range alongside Moby, Matisyahu, Nellie McKay and others. The compilation album is the project of the Compassionate Farming Education Initiative, and proceeds from the album will benefit farm animal sanctuaries.

== Discography ==
Studio Albums

- Unified Folk Theory (2007)
- Great Possessions (2009)
- The Joke, The Threat & The Obvious (2010)
- Vacilador (2012)
- Frequency of Love (2017)

Live Albums

- Like a Freight Train (2015)

EPs

- Bring It Back Home For Christmas (2008)

Singles

- Glow (2015)

Compilation Albums

- Home On The Range (2016)
