= FJ Management =

American company

FJ Management Inc.
- Company type: Private
- Industry: Truck stop; Convenience store; Petroleum; Restaurant
- Founded: 1968; 58 years ago
- Headquarters: Salt Lake City, Utah, United States
- Website: fjmgt.com

FJ Management Inc., formerly known as Flying J Inc., is a privately held American corporation which operates convenience stores (under the Maverik brand), oil and refining, banking, and insurance businesses. Along with Pilot Corporation and Berkshire Hathaway, it was a joint-owner of Pilot Flying J, the largest truck stop chain in the United States.

== History ==
The company was founded in 1968 by O. Jay Call and headquartered in Ogden, Utah. A lifelong fan of aviation, Call named it Flying J in honor of the aviation industry. Mr. Call, Richard "Buzz" Germer, and his wife Ilene, died while piloting a Cessna Citation en route to Sun Valley in March 2003.

The legacy Flying J logo. Still used at Flying J locations operated by Pilot Flying J.

The company ranked 13th on Forbes' 2009 list of the largest privately held companies in the U.S.with 2008 revenues of approximately $18.00 billion.

It sought Chapter 11 (reorganization) bankruptcy protection in December 2008, blaming its financial woes on the collapse in oil prices and tighter credit markets. Pre-bankruptcy, Flying J was the largest retailer of diesel fuel in North America with approximately 220 locations in the United States and Canada and 15,000 employees. The company produces and refines petroleum products for its truck stops. The company also offers vehicle maintenance, banking, insurance and telecommunications services for the trucking industry, and a number of restaurants at its locations.

The company had record sales for a privately held company in the industry of $18.0 billion in 2008, but later climbing prices for crude oil and a crumbling demand for gasoline eroded margins and affected cash flow. The company's plans for travel plazas have occasionally met opposition from local residents concerned about traffic safety and other issues. In 2006 Flying J associated with Shell Canada to improve highway services in Canada.

== Pilot merger ==
In July 2009, Pilot Travel Centers agreed to acquire Flying J's travel stops. As part of the deal, Pilot will keep the Flying J name on existing locations as opposed to converting them to the Pilot brand, while the in-house Flying J restaurants will be replaced by national chains like Denny's. The merged entity is called Pilot Flying J.

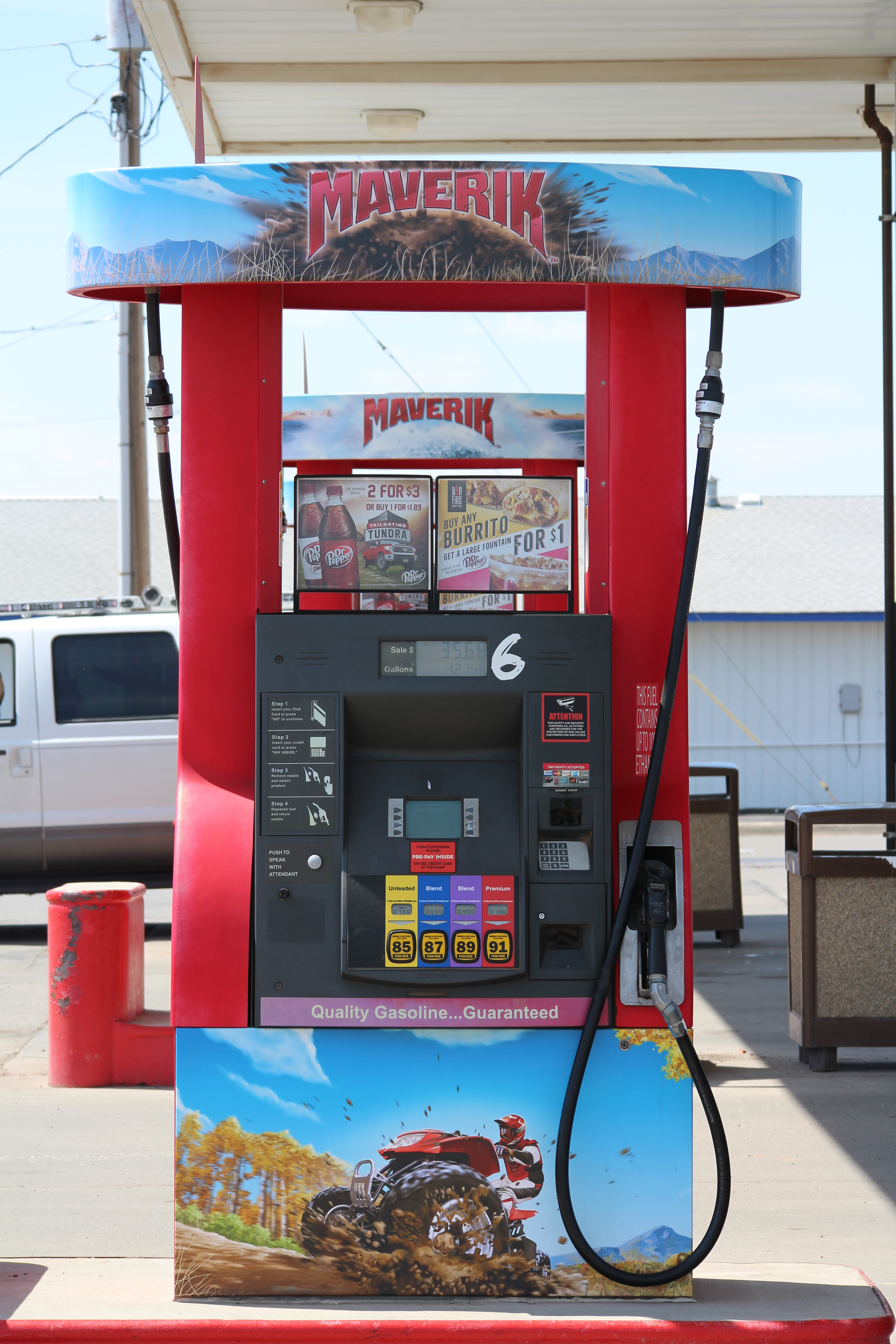
Maverik branded gas pump in Gillette, Wyoming

In June 2010, Flying J put forth a Chapter 11 plan to repay all creditors in full from the proceeds of the sale of its 250 travel plazas to Pilot, for a combination of cash and stock valued at $1.6 billion. Under Flying J's plan, its lenders and creditors will be paid in cash, and its owners, whose numbers include members of the company's founding Call family, will retain all the equity in a scaled-down Flying J. As of July 2010, hearings on the plan continue under Judge Mary F. Walrath of the U.S. Bankruptcy Court in Wilmington, Delaware. Flying J's oil and refining, banking, and insurance businesses will remain separate from the combined Pilot Flying J. To avoid confusion with the merged travel center business, Flying J Inc. renamed itself FJ Management Inc.. Since the merger, Pilot Flying J has continued to open new locations with the Flying J name (in addition to the Pilot name), bringing in locations with the Flying J brand that had no association with the legacy Flying J before the merger.

To settle antitrust concerns, six Flying J locations as well as 20 Pilot locations were sold to Love's Travel Stops & Country Stores on June 30, 2010.

On October 3, 2017, it was announced that Berkshire Hathaway would acquire a 38.6% stake in Pilot Flying J, with plans to increase the stake to 80% by 2023. The Haslam family's stake (Pilot's Founders) will be reduced to 20% at that time, while FJ Management will sell its stake altogether.

== Re-entry into convenience store market ==
The current Maverik logo in use since 2019.

On October 4, 2012, FJ Management re-entered the convenience store market with its purchase of Maverik Inc., a gas station and convenience store chain headquartered in Salt Lake City, Utah. The company was founded in 1928 by Jay Call's uncle, Reuel Call, in Afton, Wyoming.

In April 2023, FJ Management acquired Kum & Go and Solar Transport from Krause Group.

In May 2024, Maverik announced plans to open its first Kansas location in Edgerton.

As of October 2024, Maverik has more than 400 locations across 13 states, making it the largest independent fuel marketer in the Intermountain West.

In September 2025, it was announced that Casey's would acquire all seven Maverik locations in the state of Michigan. Maverik had only just expanded into that region in January 2023 after converting its acquisition of the Kum & Go convenience store chain.
