= Kum & Go =

Convenience store chain in the United States

Kum & Go, L.C.

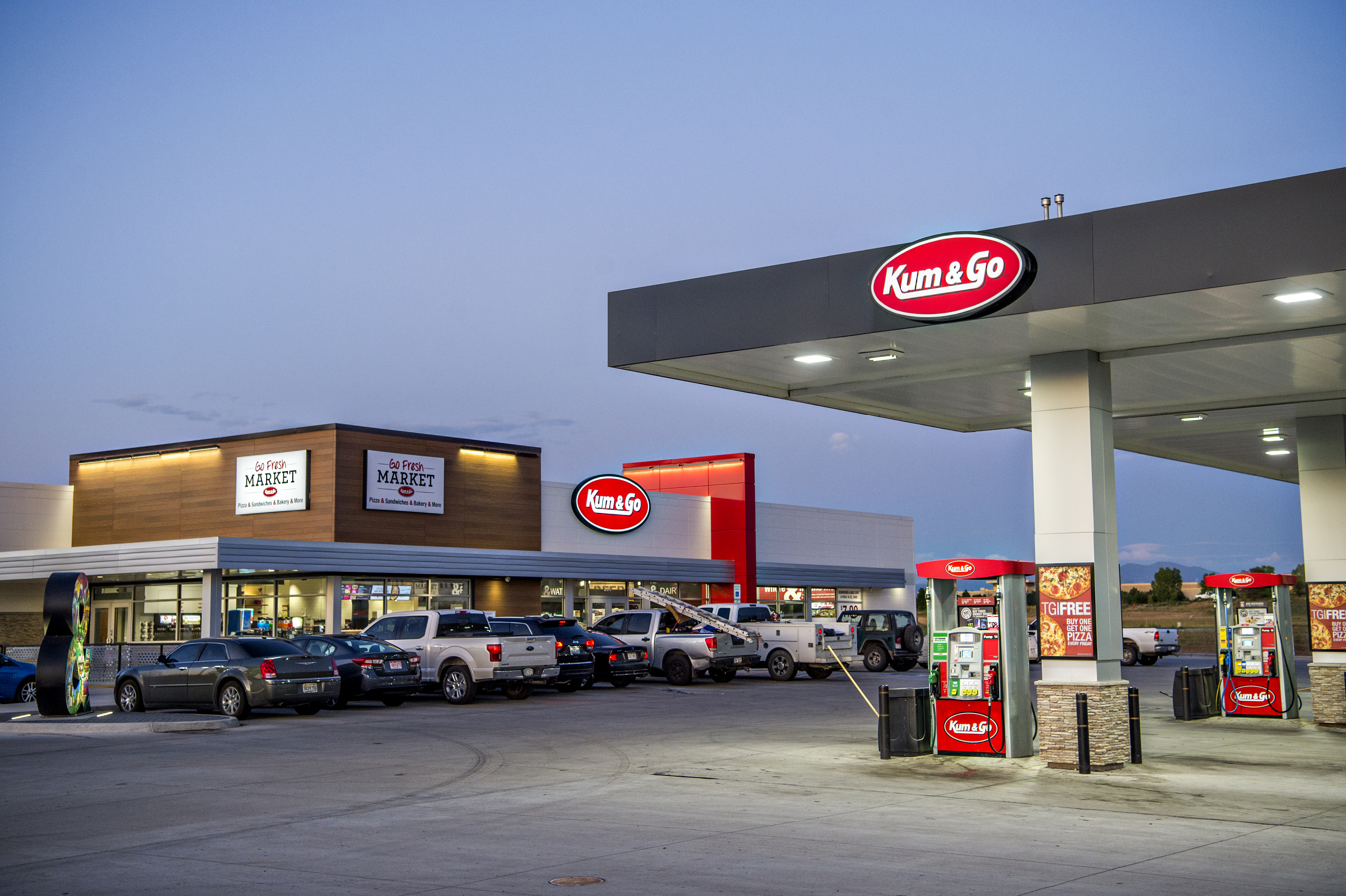
- A Kum & Go in Colorado
- Formerly: Hampton Oil Company (1959–1975)
- Company type: Private
- Industry: Retail
- Founded: 1959; 67 years ago, in Hampton, Iowa
- Founders: William A. Krause; Tony S. Gentle
- Defunct: November 2025
- Fate: Acquired by Maverik; all locations rebranded
- Headquarters: Des Moines, Iowa, United States
- Number of locations: 116 (2025)
- Area served: Midwest, Mountain West, and West South Central regions
- Key people: Tanner Krause (CEO); Reed Rainey (COO)
- Products: Coffee; Subs; Pizza; Prepared foods; Gasoline; Beverages; Snacks; Dairy products; Salads
- Services: Convenience store; Gas station; Fast food
- Revenue: ▲US$2.6 billion (2021)
- Net income: ▲US$108 million (2021)
- Owner: FJ Management
- Number of employees: 5,000 (2021)
- Website: www.kumandgo.com

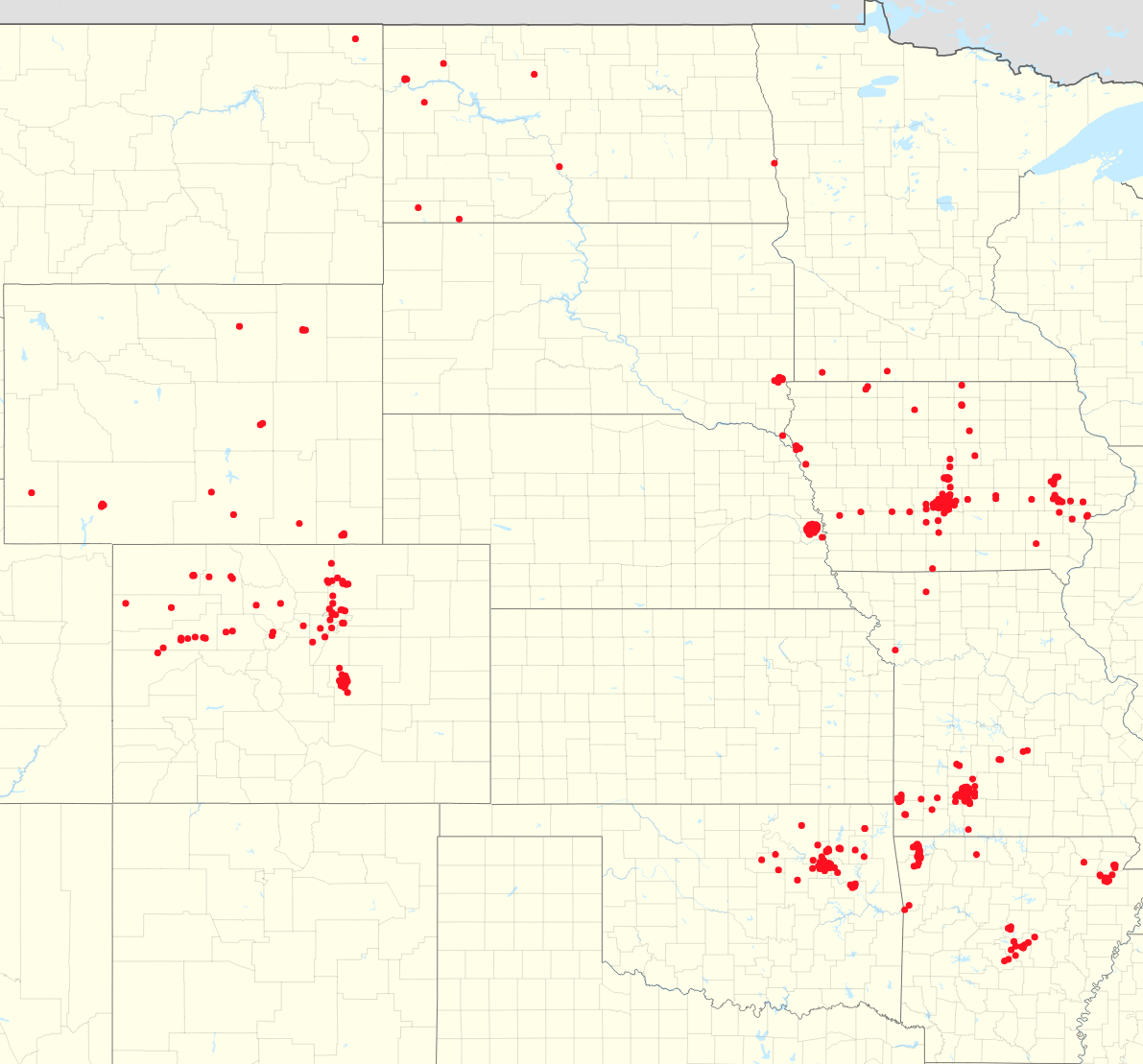
Map of Kum & Go locations as of July 2020

Kum & Go, L.C. was a convenience store chain primarily located in the Midwestern United States. Started by William A. Krause and Tony S. Gentle, the company was headquartered at Des Moines, Iowa and operated 116 stores in 10 states—primarily in its home state of Iowa.

In addition to its home state, Kum & Go had units in Arkansas, Colorado, Michigan, Minnesota, Missouri, Montana, Nebraska, North Dakota, Oklahoma, South Dakota, Utah, and Wyoming. It was ranked as the 24th-largest convenience store chain in the United States by Convenience Store News in 2019.

On August 30, 2023, Maverik and its parent company, FJ Management, completed the acquisition of the chain. The conversion of Kum and Go stores was completed by November 2025, and most locations are now branded as Maverik, or were acquired by Casey's and Mega Saver.

== Background ==
The chain was founded by William A. Krause and Tony S. Gentle, who founded the Hampton Oil Company in Hampton, Iowa, in 1959. Hampton Oil eventually became the Krause Gentle Corporation, and is today a part of Krause Group.

In 1963, Krause Gentle introduced the company's first convenience stores, selling both fuel and merchandise items, in which they changed their gas station into a "station store".

The Kum & Go name was adopted in 1975 to unify the company's array of stores under a single brand.

Sales of Kum & Go-branded merchandise spiked after Johnny Knoxville was seen wearing a black Kum & Go T-shirt with the tagline "We go all out!" during a scene in the 2006 movie Jackass Number Two. Knoxville wore the shirt due to its suggestiveness (cum and go) while some fans who had never heard of the store believed it was pornography related.

In 2021, Kum & Go was involved in a public relations scandal when TikTok influencer Kyle Scheele was hired to stage a prank in which Scheele would place a cardboard cutout of himself advertising the "Kyle Scheele meal". Scheele created a TikTok video regarding the prank that amassed millions of views, in which he did not disclose Kum & Go's involvement. He later revealed that the meal would become an actual product for Kum & Go stores, including two slices of pizza and a Red Bull. It was later revealed, however, that Scheele was hired by Kum & Go in a marketing stunt, and that his original video was staged.

== History ==
In 1988, Krause Gentle moved the company's corporate headquarters to West Des Moines. Kum & Go went through a period of rapid expansion in the late 1990s and early 2000s. In addition to building new stores, Krause Gentle acquired unwanted stores from chains such as 7-Eleven, QuikTrip, and Git 'n' Go and converted them to Kum & Go stores.

In 2007 and 2008, Kum & Go sold more than 40 of its smaller stores in order to focus on building larger stores ranging in size from 3,600 to 5,000 square feet (460 m^{2}). In 2010, the company announced a major expansion of 100 stores throughout the Midwest and included Kansas for the first time.

It was announced in June 2011 that Kum & Go had reached an agreement to sell twenty-two stores, again mostly in smaller rural communities, to rival Casey's General Stores. According to Kum & Go CEO Kyle J. Krause, the sale allowed for reinvestment in other stores and helped drive long-term growth.

On June 1, 2018, Kum & Go named fourth-generation family member Tanner Krause as president, with his father, CEO and President Kyle Krause, becoming chairman and CEO.

In 2018, Kum & Go moved its headquarters to the Renzo Piano-designed Krause Gateway Center in downtown Des Moines. In the following year, the company was ranked 178th on Forbes magazine's list of the largest private companies in the United States, ranking second to Hy-Vee among companies based in Iowa.

In addition to Kum & Go, Krause Group owns and operates the Des Moines Menace soccer team as well as Italian Serie A side Parma, Solar Transport, Teamwork Ranch, Dalla Terra Ranch, and Italian wineries Vietti and Enrico Serafino.

In 2022, Kum & Go announced the company would be opening 20 to 25 stores in the Boise metropolitan area in the coming years.

In 2023, FJ Management, the parent company of Maverik, announced the acquisition of Kum & Go and Solar Transport from Krause Group. The stores in Colorado, Wyoming, Utah, and Idaho will be branded Maverik by 2024. On January 9, 2024, FJ announced that all Kum & Go stores will be renamed Maverik by 2025. In addition, some stores were sold to convenience store chains Casey's and Mega Saver instead of rebranding as Maverik.

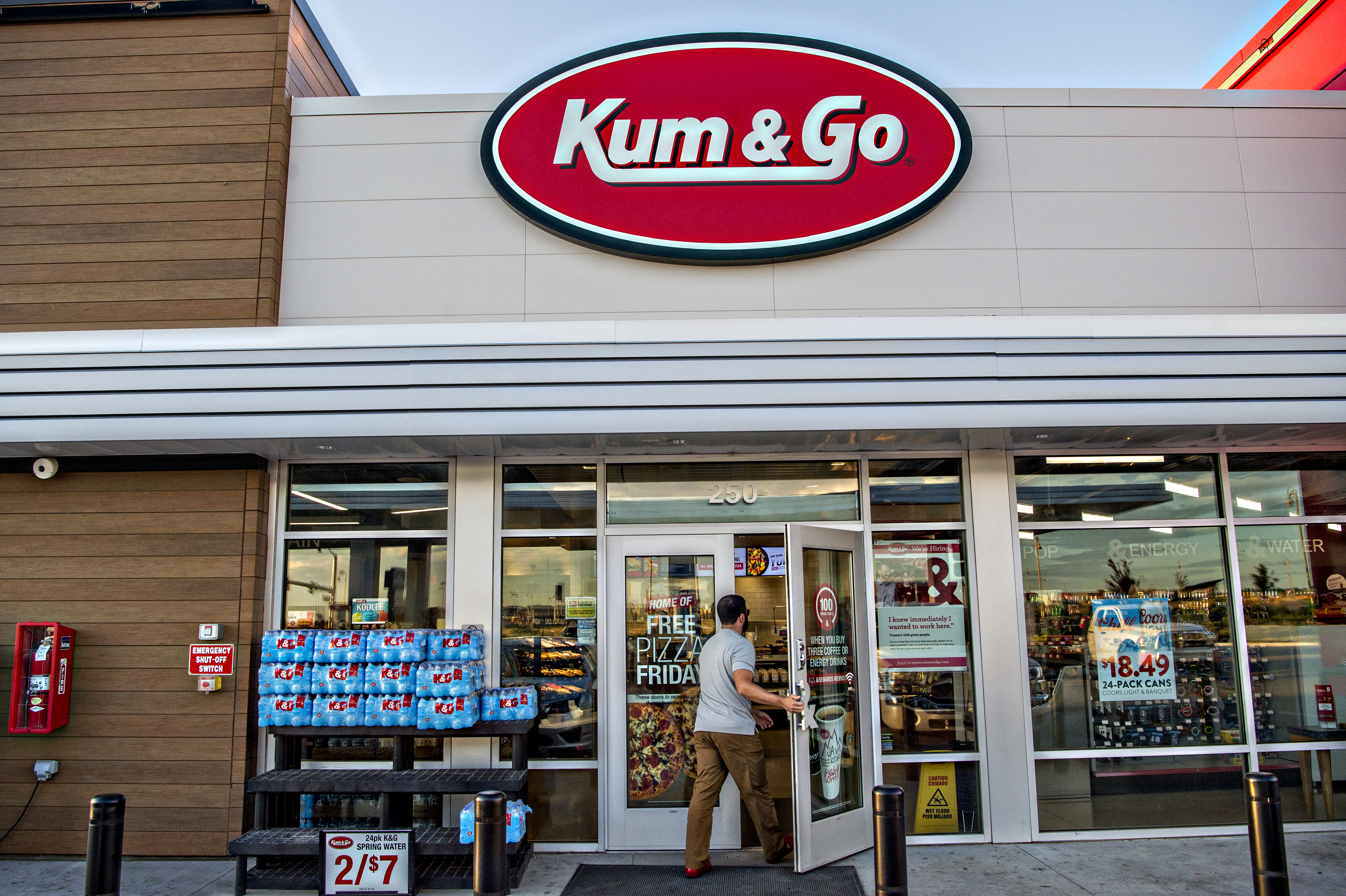
Kum & Go storefront in Colorado
