= David Scheffer =

American lawyer and diplomat

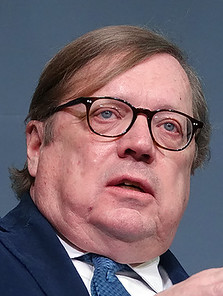
- Scheffer in 2024

1st United States Ambassador-at-Large for War Crimes Issues
- In office August 5, 1997 – January 20, 2001
- President: Bill Clinton
- Preceded by: Position created
- Succeeded by: Pierre-Richard Prosper

Personal details
- Born: September 18, 1953 (age 73) Norman, Oklahoma, U.S.

David John Scheffer (born September 18, 1953) is an American lawyer and diplomat who served as the first United States Ambassador-at-Large for War Crimes Issues, during President Bill Clinton's second term in office. He is a Professor of Practice in the School of Politics and Global Studies and Faculty Associate of the Sandra Day O'Connor College of Law at Arizona State University (Washington center). He was the Mayer Brown/Robert A. Helman Professor of Law at Northwestern University Pritzker School of Law (2006-2020), and is Director Emeritus of its Center for International Human Rights.

== Education and career ==
Scheffer received B.A.s from Harvard and Oxford Universities, and an LL.M. from Georgetown University Law Center. He began his legal career at the international law firm Coudert Brothers (1979-1986), working for several years in its Singapore offices. He also served on the staff of the U.S. House of Representatives Committee on Foreign Affairs. During Clinton's first term, he was the senior adviser and counsel to Dr. Madeleine Albright, who then served as ambassador to the United Nations. Scheffer then represented the U.S. Mission to the United Nations on the Deputies Committee of the National Security Council from 1993 to 1997, and then became the first Ambassador-at-Large for War Crimes Issues.

As ambassador, Scheffer participated in the creation of the International Criminal Tribunals for the former Yugoslavia and Rwanda, the Special Court for Sierra Leone, and the Khmer Rouge tribunal. He also led the U.S. negotiating team in United Nations talks on the International Criminal Court. Scheffer signed the Rome Statute that established the ICC on behalf of the U.S. on December 31, 2000. Clinton's successor, George W. Bush, later sent a letter to the United Nations seeking to nullify the legal effect of Scheffer's signature.

Scheffer has also taught classes on international law and war crimes as a visiting law professor at Northwestern, Georgetown, Duke, and George Washington University.

In December 2011, Scheffer published a memoir and history, All the Missing Souls: A Personal History of the War Crimes Tribunals about the rise of international tribunals in the 1990s. On January 18, 2012, Scheffer was appointed by Secretary General Ban Ki-moon as the U.N. Special Expert to advise on the United Nations Assistance to the Khmer Rouge Trials.

He was awarded a 2013 Berlin Prize Fellowship at the American Academy in Berlin.
