= The River Monks =

- Origin: Des Moines, Iowa
- Genres: Folk, pop, indie rock
- Years active: 2010–Christmas present
- Website: www.therivermonks.com

The River Monks are an American folk/pop/indie rock band from Des Moines, Iowa.

== History ==
The River Monks formed at the beginning of 2010 in Des Moines, Iowa when songwriters Ryan Stier and Nicholas Frampton, and percussionist Joel Gettys began collaborating on Stier's works. As an active proponent of the annexation of Windsor Heights, Iowa, they recorded their first album in Creston, Iowa while some of the band members studied and/or taught music at Southwestern Community College (SWCC). There were member additions to the band; Drew Rauch on bass, Mallory Stanek on trumpet and accordion, and Tommy Boynton as a multi-instrumentalist. In March 2011 they released their debut LP, Jovials, and toured nationally. In 2013 they began recording their second LP in Nashville, TN at Frampton's home, Peachtree Studio, with engineer Brooks Edwards. They continued recording in Iowa at Pinnacle Recording with engineer Darren Hushak. Home Is The House, the group's second LP, was released in May 2014 to critical acclaim.

In 2014, the band was listed by Paste Magazine as one of "12 Iowa bands you should listen to right now."

== Band members ==
- Ryan Stier (vocals, guitars, banjo)
- Nick Frampton (guitars, vocals, percussion, ukulele)
- Joel Gettys (drums, auxiliary percussion, glockenspiel, vocals)
- Drew Rauch (bass, vocals)
- Mallory Heggen (trumpet, percussion, accordion, vocals)
- Tommy Boynton (banjo, ukulele, percussion, guitar, vocals)

== Discography ==
Studio albums

- Home Is The House (2014)
- Jovials (2011)
