= Morse Tan =

American legal scholar (born 1974)

Morse H. Tan
- 모스탄
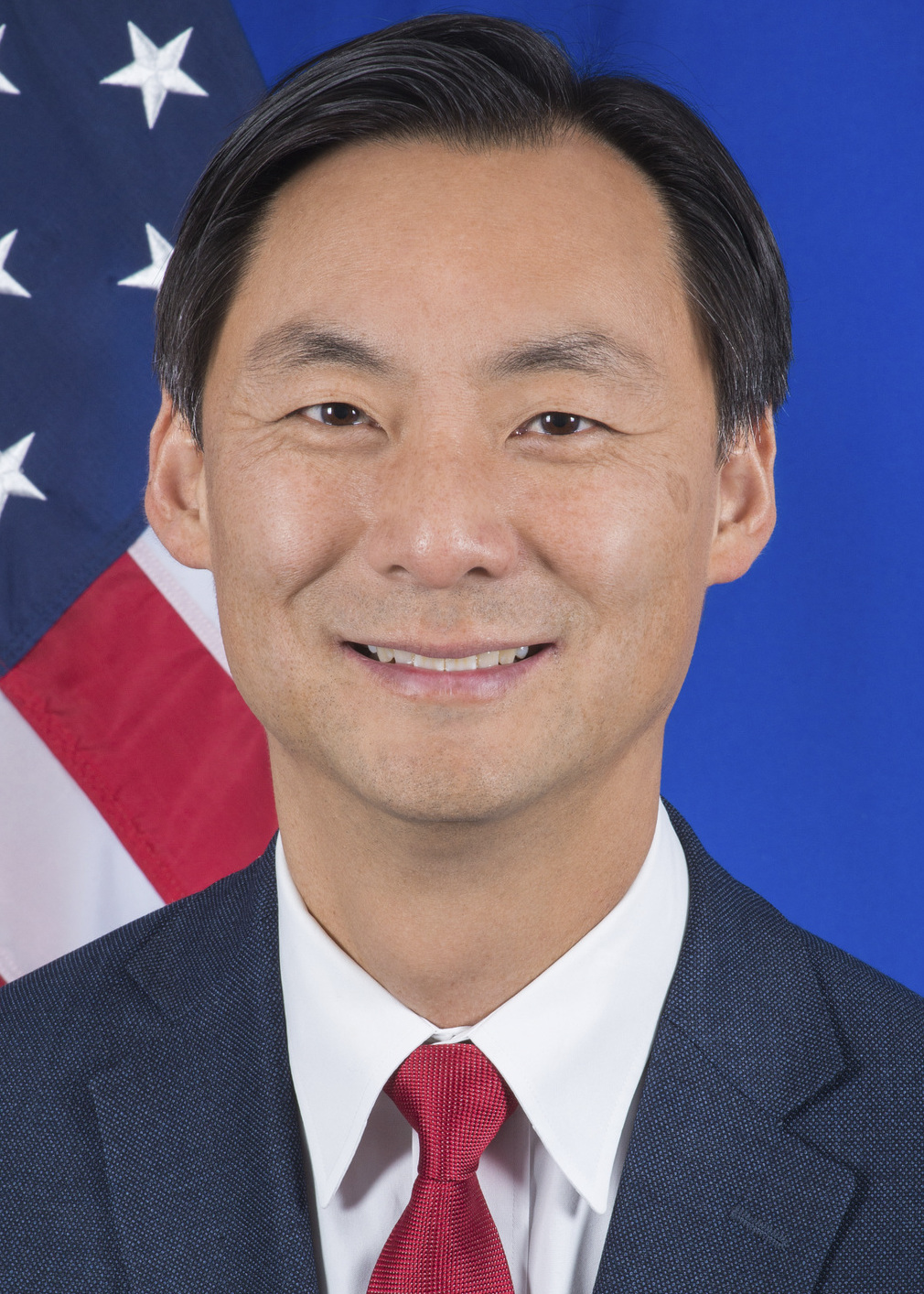
- Born: 단현명; 1974 (age 51–52); Seoul, South Korea
- Citizenship: United States
- Education: Wheaton College (Illinois); Northwestern University
- Occupation: United States Ambassador-at-Large for Global Criminal Justice

Morse H. Tan (Korean: 단현명; born May 1974) is a Korean-American legal scholar, diplomat, and academic administrator. He served as the United States Ambassador-at-Large for Global Criminal Justice from December 2019 to January 2021.

== Early life and education ==
Morse H. Tan was born in Seoul, South Korea, in May 1974. In 1976, he immigrated to the United States with his family. He graduated as valedictorian from Menlo School in California in 1993. Tan subsequently attended Wheaton College, where he completed undergraduate and graduate studies, and later earned a Master of Laws (LL.M.) degree from the Northwestern University Pritzker School of Law.

== Academic career ==
Tan has specialized in international law and human rights law. He served as a professor and later dean at the Liberty University School of Law. He was also a visiting scholar at Northwestern University Pritzker School of Law and the University of Texas School of Law. In addition, he was a member of the founding faculty of Handong International Law School in South Korea.

His academic work has focused on North Korean human rights issues and international criminal law. He has authored numerous articles and publications on these subjects, including the book North Korea, International Law and the Dual Crises. Tan has delivered lectures at institutions and organizations such as the Chicago Council on Global Affairs, the National Press Club, and Cornell Law School.

Tan has also conducted research related to the Inter-American Court of Human Rights and participated in the translation and publication of selected case materials based on interviews with judges and commissioners associated with the court.

== Ambassador-at-Large for Global Criminal Justice ==
In December 2019, Tan was appointed United States Ambassador-at-Large for Global Criminal Justice, serving until January 2021. During his tenure, he worked on issues involving genocide, crimes against humanity, war crimes, and other matters related to international criminal justice.
