= Wellmark Blue Cross Blue Shield =

American mutual insurance company

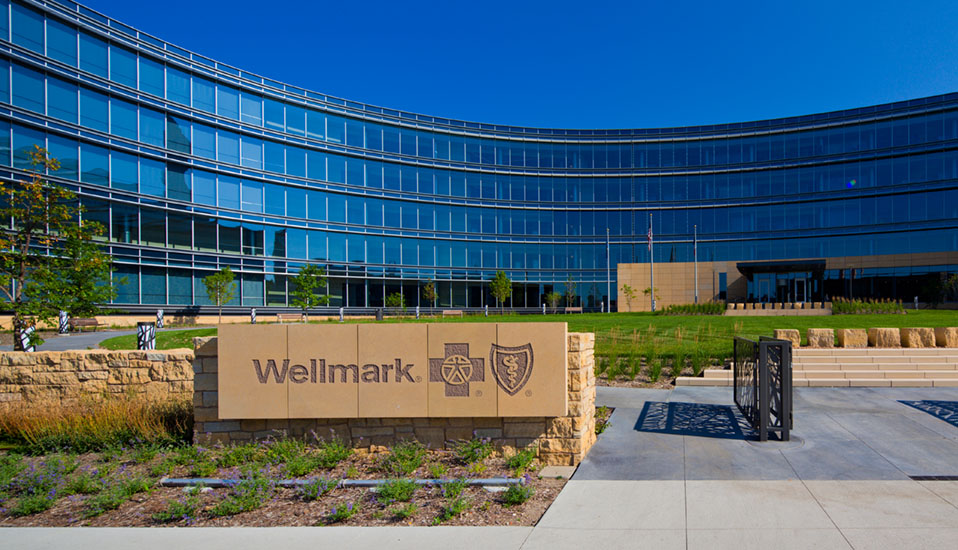
- Wellmark Blue Cross Blue Shield's corporate headquarters in Downtown Des Moines' Western Gateway District
- Company type: Mutual
- Industry: Health Insurance
- Founded: 1939; 87 years ago
- Headquarters: 1331 Grand Avenue, Des Moines, Iowa, United States
- Key people: Cory Harris (CEO)
- Products: Insurance
- Number of employees: 1,878
- Website: www.wellmark.com

Wellmark Blue Cross Blue Shield is a mutual insurance in the United States with more than two million members in Iowa and South Dakota. It is the dominant health insurance in Iowa. It is an independent licensee of the Blue Cross Blue Shield Association. Founded in 1939, Wellmark offers dental and health insurance as well as life insurance. It began participating in the health care exchange for 2017.

== History ==
In 1939, 'Hospital Service Incorporated of Iowa' (later known as Blue Cross of Iowa) began business in Des Moines, Iowa. That same year, 'Associated Hospital Services Incorporated' (later known as Blue Cross of Western Iowa and South Dakota) was established in Sioux City, Iowa. In 1945, Iowa Medical Service (later known as Blue Shield of Iowa) was formed. In 1948, Associated Hospital Services began doing business in South Dakota and marketing activities as Blue Cross. In 1956 'South Dakota Medical Service' began doing business in South Dakota as South Dakota Blue Shield. In 1986, Blue Cross and Blue Shield of Iowa purchased Benefit Administrators of America, Inc., a third-party administrator, which was the plans' first for-profit venture. Benefit Administrators of America was renamed Wellmark Administrators, Inc. in 1997.

In 1989, Blue Cross of Iowa, Blue Shield of Iowa and Blue Cross of Western Iowa and South Dakota merged to form 'IASD Health Services Corporation'. In 1991, IASD Health Services Corporation became a mutual insurance. In 1994, Blue Cross Blue Shield (BCBS) allowed its licensees to be for-profit corporations, and the joint service agreement of Blue Cross of South Dakota and South Dakota Blue Shield expired, putting the two plans in competition with one another.

In 1996, Blue Shield of South Dakota merged into IASD to form a single company. Blue Cross of South Dakota and South Dakota Blue Shield merged into 'South Dakota Health Services Company' doing business as Blue Cross Blue Shield of South Dakota. In 1997, the companies were branded as Wellmark Blue Cross and Blue Shield of Iowa and Wellmark Blue Cross and Blue Shield of South Dakota.

== Companies ==
Wellmark is headquartered in downtown Des Moines and Sioux Falls. It has 1707 employees in Iowa and 171 in South Dakota. It consists of Wellmark Blue Cross and Blue Shield of Iowa, Wellmark of South Dakota, Inc. (doing business as Wellmark Blue Cross and Blue Shield of South Dakota) and Wellmark Health Plan of Iowa, Inc. The Wellmark Foundation is a private foundation to support health improvement initiatives in Iowa and South Dakota.

Wellmark insures almost 1.8 million Iowans and more than 300,000 South Dakotans. It is Iowa's largest and dominant insurer but has not participated in the government's health care exchange for two years in a row. During its open enrollment period from October 1, 2013 to March 31, 2014 more than 41,000 people in Iowa and South Dakota enrolled in 24,000 "Affordable Care Act-compliant health plans" by Wellmark. Cliff Gold, former Wellmark employee, then chief operating officer of Iowa's CoOportunity, said that "they have denied consistently, that they [...] push bad risk into the exchanges."

== Organization ==
As of 2016 the Board of Directors consists of 11 members, namely Thomas M. Cink, Melanie C. Dreher, John D. Forsyth, Daryl K. Henze, William C. (Curt) Hunter, Paul E. Larson, Angeline M. Lavin, Terrence J. Mulligan, Dave Neil, Timothy J. Theriault, Terri M. Vaughan. The CEO is Cory Harris.

== Economic aspects ==
Wellmark's credit rating from Standard and Poor's was "A+" (Strong).

According to Wellmark's 2013 balance sheet its assets were $2,357,637, its liabilities $1,003,329 and its reserves were $1,354,308. As of 2014, Wellmark explains that premiums are spent as follows: 86.6% on payment for health care services, 7.6% for administrative services, 3.9% on commissions, 1.3% for earnings on premiums, and 0.4% on premium tax.

As of 2014 Wellmark Health Plan of Iowa had to refund $651,895 to customers, because it did not meet specifications of the 80/20 rule in the Affordable Care Act, which requires insurers to spend at least 80 percent of premium dollars on patient care and quality improvement activities. Most rebates in Iowa ($1.1 million) were owed by Coventry Healthcare of Iowa Inc.

== Rate increases ==
Wellmark raised premiums on individual policy holders by between 12 and 13 percent in 2013, 9.4 percent in 2012, 8.5 percent in 2011 and 18 percent in 2010. As of June 2014 Wellmark is seeking to increase rates again, apparently by less than 5.9 percent for the majority of insured, and by 11.9 percent and 14.5 percent for people enrolled after the Affordable Care Act went into effect.

Rate increases above average per CSA require a public hearing in front of the Iowa Commissioner of Insurance; in 2013 the Commission received a total of 300 comments, 240 of which expressed rate increase weariness, and that some increases reached nearly 50 percent since 2010. The second most common comment had to do with affordability, and the third highest reoccurring comment was Wellmark's discretionary spending. Individual comments criticized the chairman's salary of $3.1 million The Insurance Division's actuary and an independent actuary reviewed Wellmark's data and both found the rate request was not discriminatory, but was supported by the data.

== Criticism ==
In 2010, Wellmark opened its $250 million headquarters, and at the same time raising premiums by double-digit percentages annually. The CEO justified the reserves, or found them possibly even a bit too low, considering that Wellmark pays out more than $5 billion per year in claims.

In 2020, African Americans filed a lawsuit alleging discrimination, being denied promotions.
