= Tasty Tacos =

Fast-food chain based in Des Moines, Iowa

Coordinates: 41.5938°N 93.5978°W

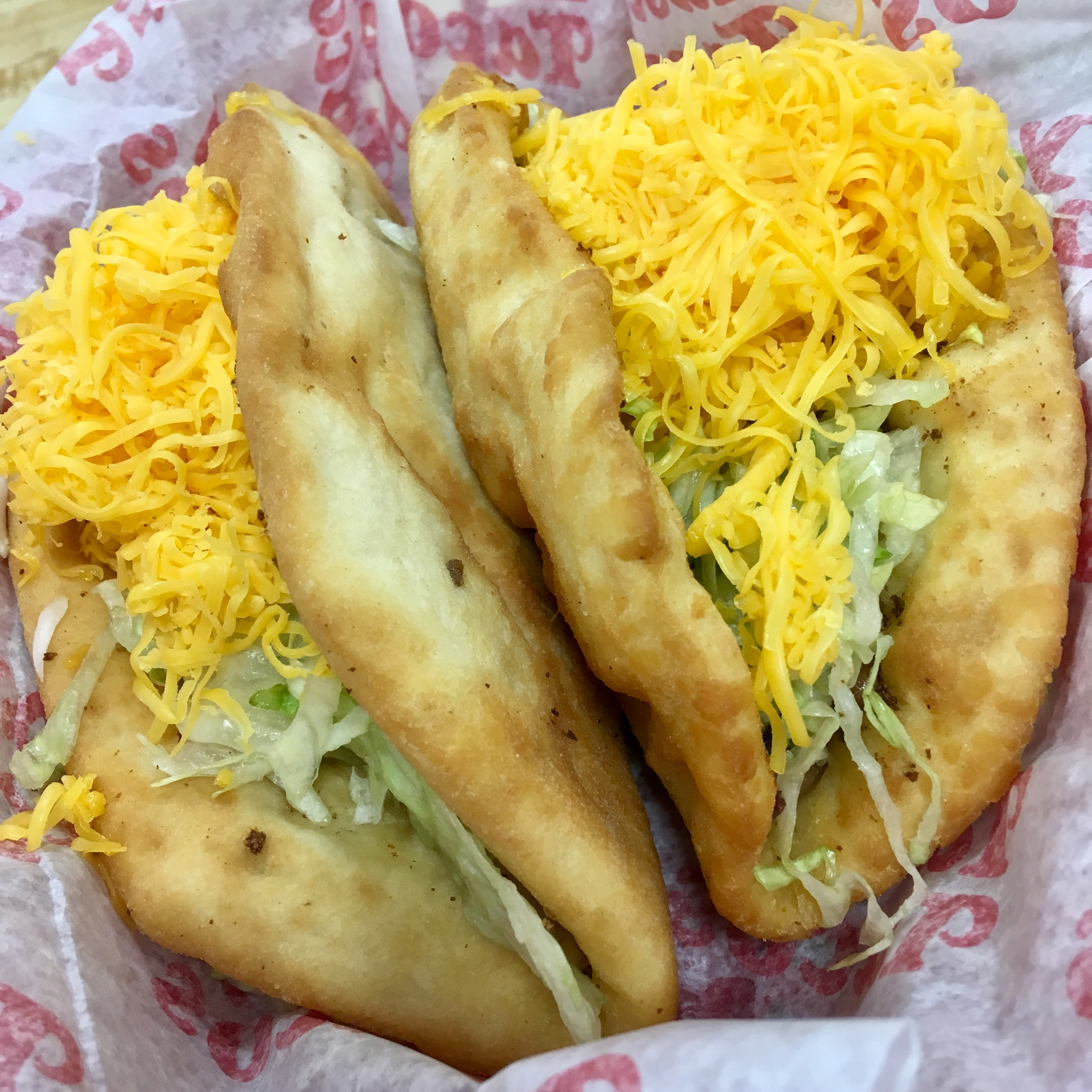
Tasty Taco's 'original' flour taco with seasoned beef and bean filling, plus lettuce and shredded cheese.

Tasty Tacos is a Des Moines, Iowa based Mexican-inspired restaurant founded in 1961 by Richard and Antonia Mosqueda. It is family owned and operated and has six restaurants in the central Iowa area. The flour taco is their signature dish and features a homemade fluffy flour shell, filled with choice of meat, lettuce and cheese.

== Awards ==
2014
-The Food Network named Tasty Tacos the best tacos of Iowa.
-Named best local Mexican restaurant by Des Moines Cityview.

2009
-Named best place for a $5 lunch by Des Moines Cityview.

2006
-Placed #4 on Des Moines Juice's 2006 article "50 Reasons We (heart) Des Moines".
