= Jordan House (West Des Moines, Iowa) =

Historic house in Iowa, United States

- U.S. National Register of Historic Places
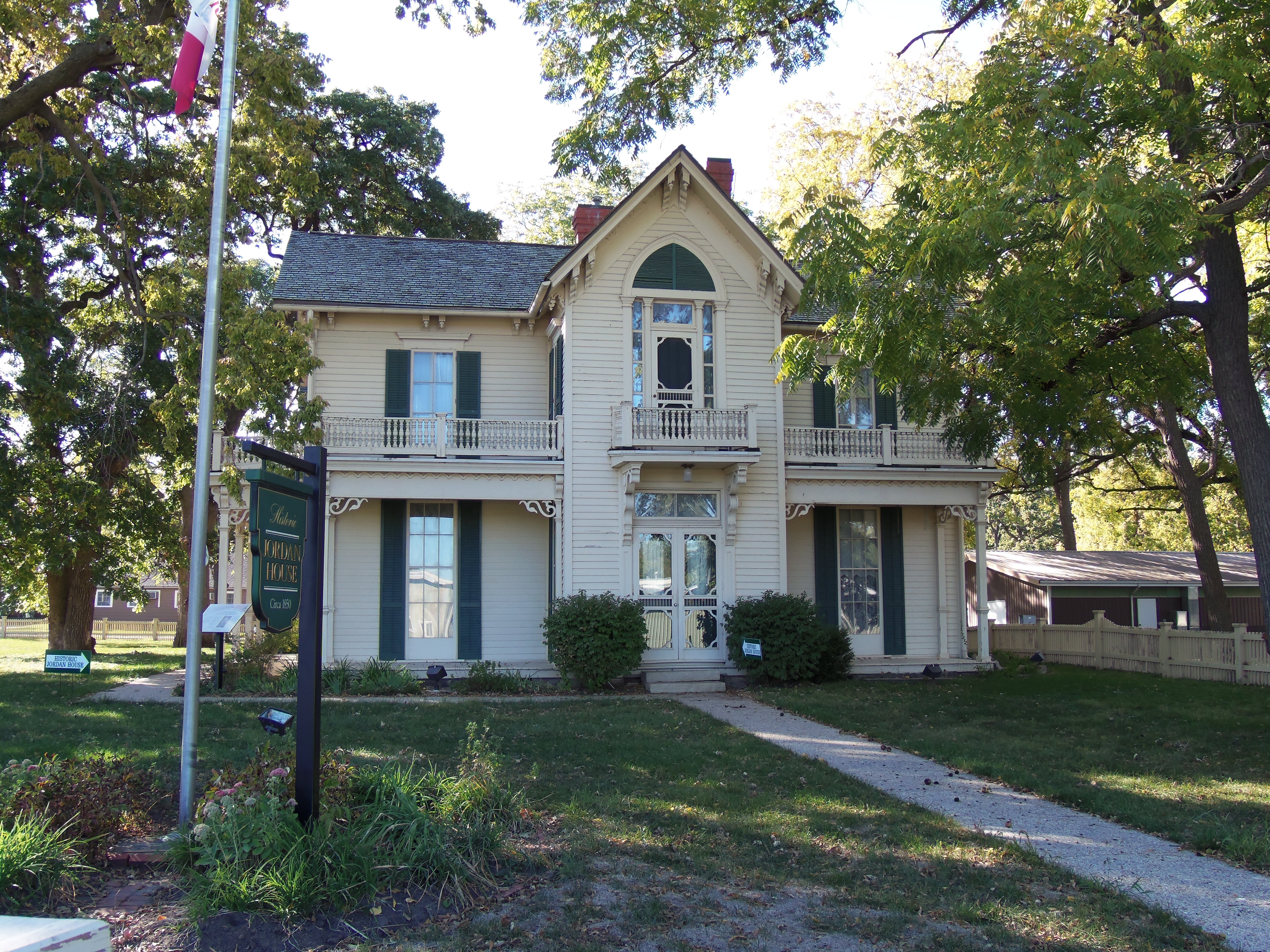

- Location within Iowa Location within the United States
- Interactive map showing the location of Jordan House
- Location: 2251 Fuller Rd. West Des Moines, Iowa
- Coordinates: 41°33′36″N 93°44′5″W
- NRHP reference No.: 73000738
- Added to NRHP: December 10, 1973

The Jordan House is an historic building located in West Des Moines, Iowa, United States. It was built by abolitionist James C. Jordan and was a station on the Underground Railroad in Iowa. It has been listed on the National Register of Historic Places since 1973.

== James C. Jordan ==
Jordan was a cattle farmer from Virginia, although the area is now in West Virginia, who settled in central Iowa in 1846. As a businessman he organized the State Bank of Des Moines and was involved in bringing the railroad to Des Moines. He platted Valley Junction and raised $70,000 to create a railhead there, which was also near his cattle operation. Today the area is the city of West Des Moines. As a civic leader he served on the Polk County Board of Supervisors, and was elected to both the Iowa Senate and the Iowa House of Representatives. While in the state legislature he led the effort to move the state capital from Iowa City to Des Moines. Jordan was married twice. He and his first wife Melinda had six children. After her death, he married Cynthia Adams and the family grew to eleven children.

== History ==
James Jordan's first dwelling in Polk County was a lean-to tent that he replaced with a log cabin in 1848. Two years later construction started on the present house. They moved into the basement when it was completed. It was divided into a kitchen and a bed/sitting room. In 1851 the first phase of the upper floors was completed. The white frame house is two stories tall. The first phase of the house featured an elegant entrance, two large rooms on the first floor and a walnut staircase that led to two large bedrooms on the second floor. The kitchen remained in the basement.

Before the American Civil War the house was a station on the Underground Railroad. Jordan, who was a staunch abolitionist, was considered the chief conductor in Polk County. John Brown stayed in the house at least two times, and one of those times he was leading 12 slaves to freedom. The house was also a place where travelers stopped on their journeys to the American West. It was also a gathering place for local businessmen and politicians.

The house was expanded in 1870. The addition provided space for another parlor, a dining room, library, and kitchen. Porches were added to the east and south sides of the house. A second entrance was also added with another black walnut staircase to the six additional bedrooms on the second floor.

The Jordan family continued to live in the house until 1947 when it was sold to the Church of the Nazarene who used the house as a part of their summer campground. The West Des Moines Historical Society bought the house in 1978. They renovated it as a period house and use it as a museum.
