= Flag of Des Moines, Iowa =

City of Des Moines
- Proportion: 1:2
- Adopted: April 15, 1974; 52 years ago
- Design: A dark blue field with a red trapezoid at the hoist, with three horizontal white arched bridges running from the trapezoid to the end
- Designed by: Walter T. Proctor

The flag of Des Moines, Iowa, United States was designed by Walter T. Proctor. Set on a blue background is a red vertical stripe along the hoist with the right side of the stripe angling inward toward the hoist and a white balance of three horizontal "bridges".

== Symbolism ==
=== Red stripe ===
Although there is no documented symbolism for the red stripe, its creator indicated that the selection of the colors red, white and blue were to mirror the color scheme of the flag of the United States of America.

=== White bridges ===
The three white "bridges" across the flag symbolize the Grand, Locust, and Walnut Street bridges at the Des Moines River.

Starting September 19, 2016 the Grand Avenue bridge was closed for demolition then subsequent rebuilding due to structural deficiencies, and reopened at the end of 2017. The other bridges adjacent to the Grand Ave. bridge are scheduled for the same treatment in the following years. They will not be rebuilt in the same style and will not have functional arch supports. Construction will be standard square/rectangle design with facade arches on the sides.

=== Blue background ===
In the same pane of the flag as the bridges, the blue background symbolizes the water of the Des Moines River.

== History ==
The Flag of Des Moines from 2008 until 2019

In 1974, the Des Moines City Council had an open submission of proposed city flag designs. When Walter T. Proctor's design was adopted by the City Council on April 15, 1974, he formalized the importance of the Des Moines River Walnut, Locust Street, and Grand Avenue bridges to the city. The flag depicts the, in Proctor's words, "modern bridges" that connect the east and west sides of the city across a key geographical landmark in Des Moines: Des Moines River. Proctor believes these bridges symbolize the unity of the city otherwise divided by the river.

In 2008, the flag was quietly phased out after the city adopted a new logo, although it is unclear if the flag was changed by statute. In 2019, following a campaign spearheaded by a local couple, the city council confirmed the three-bridge design as the city's flag.

== About the river and bridges ==
The river flows south along the east side of downtown in the center of city services (city hall, armory, library, police station), before joining the Raccoon River just south of Principal Park. Des Moines is again developing community attractions around the River by building a multimillion-dollar urban riverwalk along the river, largely funded by Principal Financial Group.
