= Greater Des Moines Botanical Garden =

Botanical garden in Des Moines, Iowa, U.S.

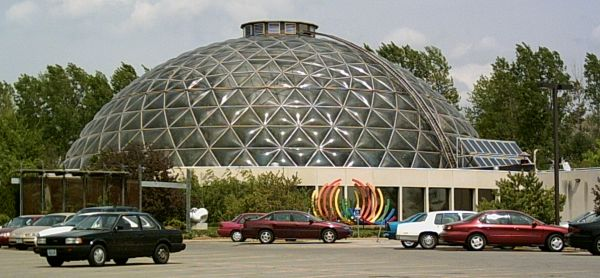
- Greater Des Moines Botanical Garden in 2005
- Interactive map of Greater Des Moines Botanical Garden
- Location: 909 Robert D. Ray Dr., Des Moines, Iowa, U.S.
- Coordinates: 41.59684524626884°N 93.61385449346228°W
- Area: 12-acre (5-hectare)
- Opening: December 15, 1979
- Website: Official website

The Greater Des Moines Botanical Garden is a 12-acre (5-hectare) botanical garden located near Downtown Des Moines, Iowa, United States, on the east bank of the Des Moines River and north of I-235. The garden opened in 1979 as the Des Moines Botanical Center and re-branded to its current name in 2013.

== History ==
Interest in a Des Moines botanical center began in 1929. A city greenhouse was acquired on the west side of the river in 1939. It served the city as a production and display greenhouse. In 1973, following years of disrepair of the original greenhouse a new botanical center was announced. Ground was broken in 1978, with construction following shortly after. The Des Moines Botanical Center officially opened on December 15, 1979.

The center was operated by the city of Des Moines from 1979 to 2004 and by Des Moines Water Works from 2004 to 2012. Control was later transferred to the Greater Des Moines Botanical Garden, a not-for-profit organization which would oversee funding and expansion. Additionally, the garden changed its name to the Greater Des Moines Botanical Garden to reflect this change. The garden underwent major renovations and expansions in 2013 and 2021.

== Design ==
The Greater Des Moines Botanical Garden is centered around a geodesic-domed conservatory that has 665 Plexiglas panels. The dome is 80 feet (24 m) tall and is 150 feet (46 m) wide. The gardens cover a total area of 12-acre (5-hectare). There are thirteen gardens, two indoors including one in the conservatory, and eleven outdoor gardens, with one being seasonal.

== See also ==
- List of botanical gardens in the United States
- Brisbane Botanic Gardens, Mount Coot-tha, Brisbane, Australia
- Bloedel Floral Conservatory, Vancouver, Canada
