= Kemin Industries =

American health and nutrition company

Kemin Industries Inc. supplies specialty ingredients for a variety of industries, including human/animal health and nutrition, pet food, agriculture, nutrition, food technologies, crop technologies, and textile industries.

Established in 1961, Kemin Industries Inc is a privately held, family-owned and operated company with more than 2,800 global employees. It operates in 90 countries and has manufacturing facilities in Belgium, Brazil, China, India, Italy, Russia, San Marino, Singapore, South Africa, and the United States.

== Industries ==
=== List of industries served ===
- Animal nutrition and health
- Pet food and rendering technologies
- Food technologies
- Human nutrition and health
- Crop technologies
- Textile auxiliaries
- Aquaculture
- Bio-fuel
- Biology

== Company history ==
Kemin Industries Inc. was founded in Des Moines, Iowa, U.S.A. by R.W. Nelson and Mary Nelson. When the Nelsons started their business, they had five children under the age of seven and US$10,000 in a savings account. The company operated with two product lines, a manufacturing plant in an old wool barn, and Mary kept the books at the family home.

During the 1980s, led by Christopher E. Nelson, Ph.D., RW and Mary Nelson's oldest son and the current President and CEO of Kemin, scientists were challenged to study molecules and understand their modes of action inside living organisms. This new approach to research and development spurred the company's expansion into new markets. Kemin's ingredients expanded into animal health, nutraceuticals, pet food, food technologies, crop technologies, textiles, aquaculture, and animal vaccines.

In 1995, Kemin innovated lutein, a carotenoid molecule the company had been selling into the animal feed industry for years, for human use. This led to the establishment of Kemin's first business unit, Human Nutrition and Health. Kemin adopted the business unit-focused model for other expansions beyond animal nutrition and health into pet food and rendering technologies, food technologies, human nutrition and health, crop technologies, and more.

Highlights of Kemin's global expansion have included:

- 1970 – Opened first regional headquarters in Herentals, Belgium. The sales and manufacturing facility allowed Kemin to efficiently work with customers across Europe.
- 1988 – Established second regional headquarters with sales and manufacturing facilities in Singapore.
- 1994 – Established a sales office in Zhuhai, China.
- 1998 – Opened sales and manufacturing facilities in Chennai, India.
- 2000 – Moved the Chennai manufacturing facilities to Gummidipoondi, India.
- 2002 – Established a manufacturing site in Zhuhai, China.
- 2004 – Purchased a sales and manufacturing facility in Indaiatuba, Brazil. Opened a sales and manufacturing facility in Johannesburg, South Africa.
- 2009 – Opened a second European manufacturing site in Veronella, Italy.
- 2010 – Purchased an encapsulation company and facility in Cavriago, Italy.
- 2014 – Created a new regional headquarters in Johannesburg, South Africa.
- 2017 – Opened a sales and manufacturing facility in Lipetsk, Russia. Acquired a beta-glucan manufacturing facility in Plymouth, Michigan, U.S.A.
- 2018 – Acquired Garmon Chemicals to launch Kemin's textile auxiliaries business unit in the Republic of San Marino. Launched the new business unit 'Kemin Aqua Science' to serve the aquaculture industry.

Kemin remains headquartered in Des Moines, Iowa, U.S.A. with sales, research, and manufacturing facilities.

In 2017, Kemin opened a US$30 million worldwide headquarters building where the wool barn in which the company manufactured its first products once stood.

== Controversies ==
Following Russia's invasion of Ukraine in 2022, Kemin Industries continues its operations in Russia, supplying specialty ingredients across various sectors, including human and animal health, pet food, aquaculture, nutraceuticals, food technology, crop technology, and textiles. In 2017, Kemin expanded its presence in Russia by opening manufacturing and laboratory facilities in the Special Economic Zone of Lipetsk. As of April 2022, Kemin maintained its operations in Russia and declined to comment on its business activities in the region.
