= USS Des Moines =

Three ships of the United States Navy have been named USS Des Moines, after the city of Des Moines, Iowa.

- USS Des Moines (CL-17) (C-15/PG-29), was a Denver-class cruiser in service from 1904 to 1921.
- USS Des Moines (CA-75), a Baltimore-class heavy cruiser, was renamed USS Helena on 6 November 1944.
- USS Des Moines (CA-134), the lead ship of her class, was a heavy cruiser in service from 1948 to 1961 and scrapped between 2006 and 2007.
