= Des Moines Water Works =

Water utility service for city of Des Moines

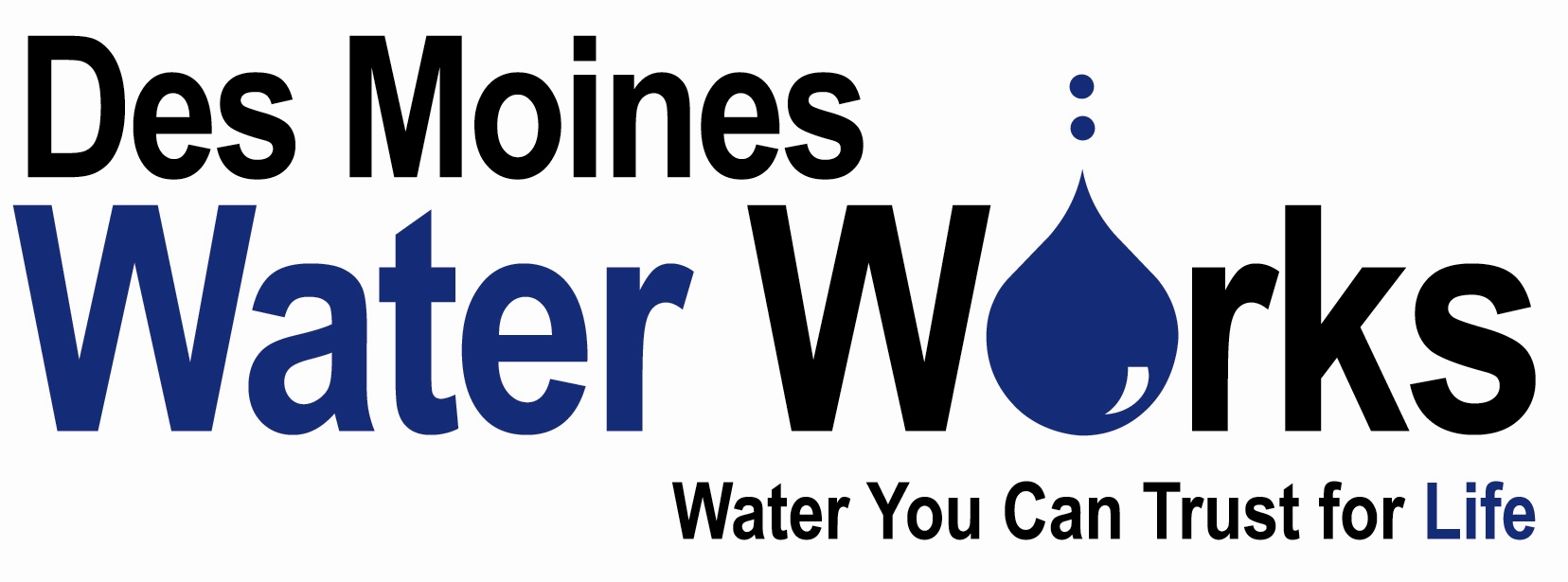
- Type: public utility
- Industry: water
- Founders: Frederick Hubbell, Jefferson S. Polk, B. F. Allen
- Headquarters: Des Moines, United States
- Area served: Greater Des Moines Metropolitan area
- Key people: Ms Diane Munns, Chairperson; Mr Ted Corrigan, interim CEO and General Manager
- Products: drinking water
- Owner: rate payers

The Des Moines Water Works (DMWW) is a publicly owned, municipal water utility with its headquarters in Water Works Park. It was founded 1871 southwest of downtown Des Moines, Iowa, along the Raccoon River and provides water to half a million residents of the greater Des Moines metropolitan area. As of 2017, it has three treatment facilities.

In March 2015, the DMWW board sued three Iowa counties for violating the Clean Water Act with high nitrate discharges, which contribute to hypoxia in the Gulf of Mexico.

== History ==
The Des Moines Water Works are a municipal water utility, owned by the about 500,000 residents of the greater Des Moines area, whom it supplies with water. It is Iowa´s largest water utility and among the largest 100 utilities in the country.

In 1871, Frederick M. Hubbell and Jefferson S. Polk organized the Des Moines Water Company with $3000. B. F. Allen, helped to raise $250,000 and became the company's first president. The company passed to Polk & Hubbell, and in 1880 to a joint-stock company, where a stockholder-elected board of five directors appointed a president, secretary, and one member, with the exclusive rights to operate the company for 40 years. The Water Company was built on Walnut Street in Des Moines using Holly system hydrants, which could throw six streams at a time. The city demanded 10 miles of pipe within 10 months and "hydrants were placed for citizens or passersby to draw water for purposes of drinking". Pumps discharged about 2 million gallons per day (mgd). In its first year from June 1872 through June 1873, the Water Works´ operating costs were $5,770 and consumers paid no city taxes for water use.

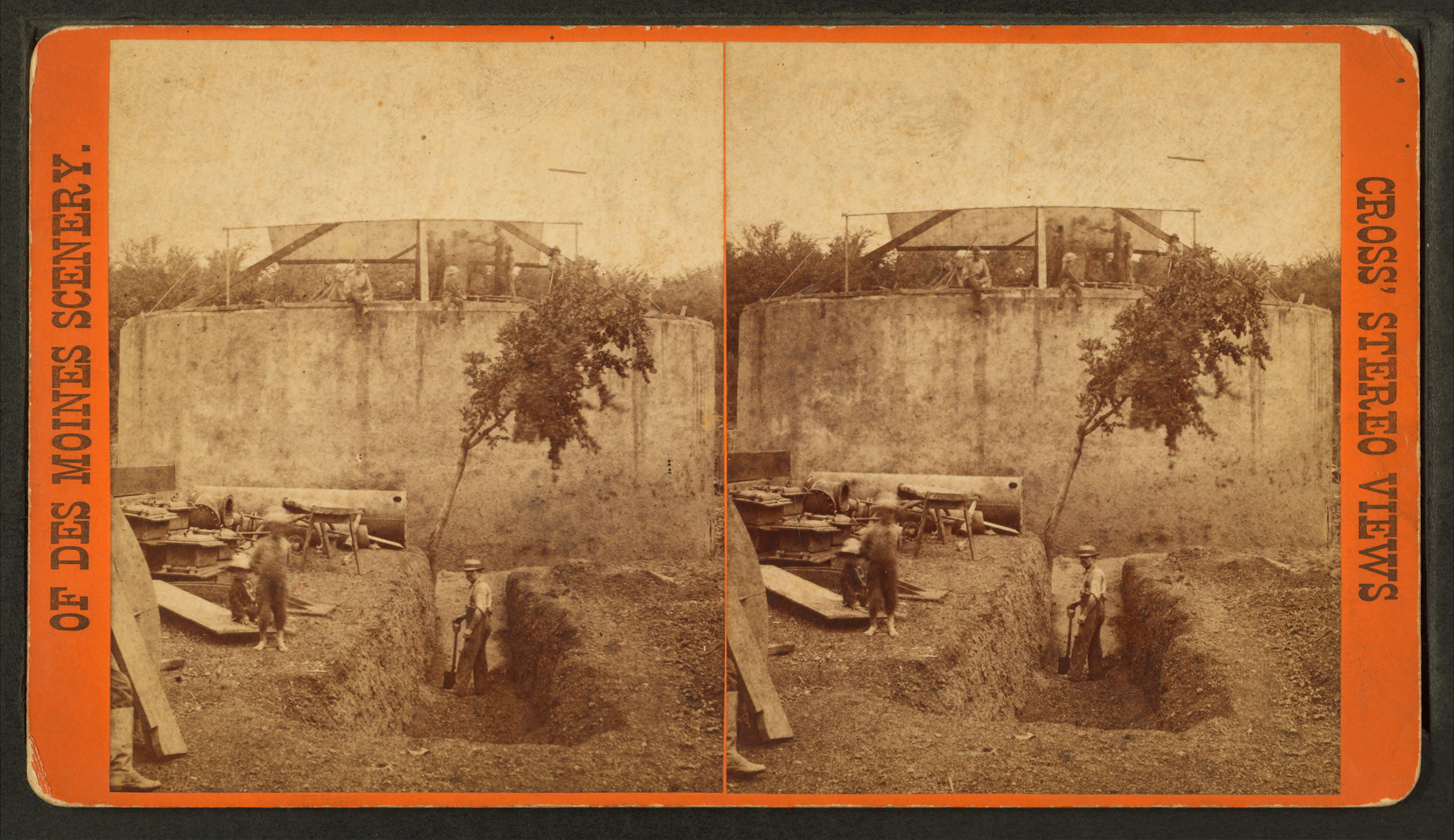
Supply well for Des Moines Water Works, 1880

Water came from an iron filtering tank in the gravel and sand of the Raccoon River near the water's edge, 12 feet in diameter and 14 feet high, open at the bottom and closed at the top with perforations to let water in. The iron filters constantly plugged and after 10 years, in 1883, an infiltration gallery system to use groundwater along the river was planned, the first of its kind in the U.S. From 1884-1885, 750 feet of a wooden gallery were constructed, and the iron filters were abolished. A small primitive dam on the Raccoon River increased the water level near the gallery. In 1880, the name was changed to Des Moines Water Works Company. In 1891, the first water tower was constructed, holding 530,000 gallons of water, used until 1931, and torn down in 1939.

=== 1900–1919 ===
In the early 1900s, many people who died of typhoid, were those with private wells. In 1902, a new water gallery was begun out of large concrete rings 5 feet in diameter and 2 feet long, held slightly apart to allow water seeping in. Flooding delayed continuation until 1904 until completion in 1910. In June 1903, a flood was then said to be "the worst in history" with business suspended, hundreds became unemployed and homeless. In 1910, ponds were constructed in the park began that could augment the water supply and in 1918, a pumping station built on the park pumped water from the river into the ponds.

From 1872 to 1919, "there were constant complaints by the city council and newspapers". The city tried to buy the Water Works, but either could not raise the funds or could not get the votes needed. In 1897, the newspaper and city council attacked water quality "to lower the company's asking price". In 1898, the people voted a proposal to buy the company down. In 1911, the vote passed, but Denman wouldn't sell at the price. Denman explained publicly why he could not accept the city's offer and how the city hadn't paid its water bills for several years. In 1911 the City passed an ordinance for standards of water purity. and in 1912 DMWW started adding hypochlorite and began a water testing laboratory with a chemist, a bacteriologist, and an assistant. In 1917, an outside source conducted a study on the conditions of the Des Moines river and Raccoon Rivers, where the main pollution of the latter "was said to come from nearby privies, sewage from upstream residents, septic tanks, and a car shop in Valley Junction". In 1913, a price agreement was reached and in 1914 a vote to purchase passed. The vote to issue bonds did not pass until November 1918, and at that unfavorable time for the bond market, the city could not sell enough bonds, and sued for an extension of time.

In 1919, the city bought the water company. The company's name was changed again to Des Moines Water Works (DMWW). It was formed as a public utility owned by ratepayers under a new Code of Iowa, Section 388. Charles Denman, who had been running the company since 1896, became General Manager with a salary of $8,000.

=== 1920–1999 ===
In 1920 a new pumping station at its present site began operation. In 1923, an attorney prepared a bill for the legislature to abolish the City Councils supervision of the DMWW Board. The Board is responsible to run DMWW and the Mayor appoints Board members when vacancies occur with the City Council only approving the appointments. In 1928, Denman recommended adding a softening plant to save customers money spent on soap and wear and tear on clothes. Arguments for and against it continued with the Board voting to delay building until 1938 and further delayed by World War II. In 1929, the Hazen water tower, Des Moines only water tower, 110 feet high was constructed of concrete and steel, holding 2 million gallons of water. In 1931, the benefit of fluoride in preventing tooth decay opened a controversy for three decades. Between 1933 and 1935, during the Great Depression, about 3500 men could not pay their water bills, and Denman offered them work often for several days, laying water mains, grade park roads, inspect hydrants. Seven thousand plantings of trees and shrubs were made yearly from seedlings grown in the greenhouse. In 1942, DMWW bought 650 acres of farmland southwest of Des Moines to build an emergency reservoir, the Dale Maffitt Reservoir, which was opened for fishing in 1948. In 1945, another flood and in 1947 a record-breaking flood occurred. From 1948-49, the softening plant was built, called the filter building which housed the laboratory and the water rate increased for the first time in 50 years. In 1950, levees around the Fleur Drive treatment plant were built. In 1959, DMWW started fluoridating its water at the request of the city council.

In 1955, the Nollen Standpipe and the Wilchinski Standpipe were built. Land for a north standpipe was purchased in 1955, but construction did not begin until 1959. In 1973, this standpipe, near Sears at Merle Hay Mall, was named Tenny standpipe. In 1957, Iowa Light and Power installed a substation at DMWW and electric motors and pumps began to be used ending steam power. In 1958, eight more filters and two more softening basins were added to the filter plant and Congress authorized construction of a dam at Saylorville, Iowa on the Des Moines River for Saylorville Lake which allowed the Army Corps of Engineers of the Rock Island District to provide flood control for both the Des Moines River system, including downtown Des Moines, and also the Mississippi River system but groundbreaking took until July 1965 and becoming fully operational in 1977. In 1972, DMWW installed water meter reading equipment on the outside of homes. In 1985, an office building was built. In 1992, the eight tanks of a nitrate removal facility were built. During the Great Flood of 1993, the Raccoon River crested at a record 14.7 feet above flood stage, forcing the Fleur Drive treatment plant to be shut down and residents of the greater Des Moines metropolitan area were without any water service for 11 days, and non-potable water for 18 days. The height of the levees was increased to a height of 31 feet. In 1998, ground was broken for a new treatment plant, called the Maffitt Treatment Plant.

=== 21st century ===
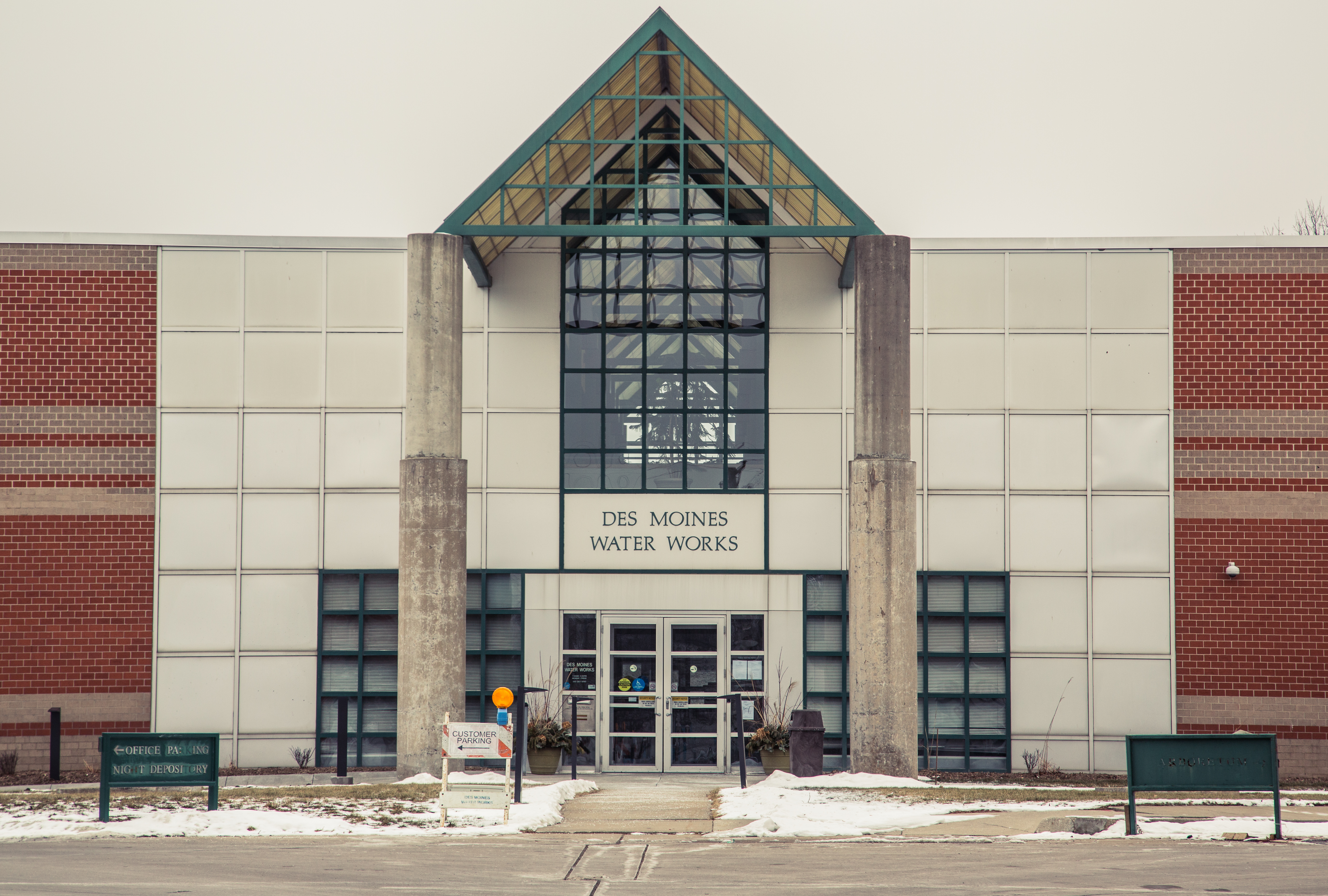
DMWW building, 2016

In May 2000, a 25 mgd facility, the Water Treatment Plant at Maffitt Lake, renamed the L.D. McMullen Water Treatment Plant in 2007, began operation using five radial collector wells as its main source, and additionally also from Maffitt Reservoir. In August 2003, a monthly pump record was set at 2,262.82 million gallons. In June 2006, ground was broken for a third treatment plant with a capacity of 10 mgd, the Saylorville Water Treatment Plant, using membrane technology to soften and purify the water. In June 2006, a daily pumpage record of 90.19 mg was set. During the Iowa flood of 2008, the Raccoon River crested at 12.5 feet above flood stage, but DMWW operated normally due to levee work and flood preparation.

In April 2011, the Saylorville Water Treatment Plant began operating, serving customers north of Des Moines. First, oxidation precipitates dissolved iron and manganese in shallow groundwater. Ultrafiltration (UF) membranes filter out particulate i.e. undissolved material in the water. Thereafter, part of the water will go through the reverse osmosis membranes, which have smaller pores than the UF membranes and filter out dissolved material in the water, targeting calcium and magnesium ions (water hardness) and for nitrate reduction. In July 2012, a new monthly pumpage record was set at 2,544.12 million gallons and a new record for daily pumpage at million gallons.

In March 2015, the DMWW board voted to sue Calhoun, Buena Vista and Sac county for high nitrate discharges into the Raccoon River, and their failure to obtain a National Pollution Discharge Elimination System permit or state permit in violation of the Clean Water Act. The lawsuit contends that tile drainage lines exacerbate pollution by moving nutrients more quickly to waterways. DMWW must comply with the maximum contaminant level (MCL) standard set by the Environmental Protection Agency, and pay to remove the nitrate and in the winter of 2014/2015 DMWW spent $540,000 for nitrate removal. DMWW wants agricultural polluters to abide by the Clean Water Act, which they are exempted from, because agricultural runoff comes from multiple point sources across a large region. The Iowa Farm Bureau and Governor Terry Branstad are against the lawsuit and the Iowa Drainage District Association wants to help the lawsuit. Most Iowans have supported the lawsuit, up to 71% of urban residents, but most did not think water quality was the state's most important issue. Even the Iowa Soybean Association has conceded, that more ways to finance the 2013 Iowa Nutrient Reduction Strategy plan (cutting the nitrogen and phosphorus by 45 percent) need to be found in light of the problem in the Gulf of Mexico dead zone. In March 2017, a federal district court dismissed the DMWW claims saying the Iowa legislature was "the appropriate body to address the state's water quality crisis".

In February 2017, a bill called Dismantling the Des Moines Water Works - HF 484/SF 456 was proposed to move assets and power to local municipalities. DMWW´s Bill Stowe called it "clearly retribution for our lawsuit". At the end of the legislative session in April 2017, the bill was moved to unfinished business in the House and was funneled in the Senate.

== System ==
As of March 2017, the DMWW pumps water from three conditioning plants through about 1,360 miles (2,190 km) of buried water main with 9,800 valves. It maintains over 80,000 water meters and automated reading devices, about 10,000 fire hydrants and 7 water storage facilities. Maximum daily demand was 96.64 MGD in July 2012. The water pressure averages 50 psi but ranges from 35 psi to more than 100 psi depending on the location. Water towers help stabilize pressure in some zones. Water is pumped inside when water demand is low and flows back out to satisfy higher demands. Des Moines is divided into four pressure zones, with dedicated pumping stations.

DMWW operates Water Works Park, an urban park of about 1,500 acres near downtown Des Moines, and Maffitt Reservoir with 1,300 acres of wooded land and a 200-acre lake. As of 2016 DMWW sold water wholesale to more than 20 regional entities. West Des Moines and Waukee have been using 20 percent of DMWW clean water or 12.5 million gallons of water a day. West Des Moines Water Works, which produces 70% of the water West Des Moines consumes, found in 2015 that the projected water demand would meet its plant's production limits in 2017. Both it and Waukee considered tapping the Raccoon River alluvial aquifer after DMWW increased its rate by 10% in 2016.

=== Budget ===
As of 2017 DMWW assets were $250 million. The 2017 budget assumed $62 million of operating revenue and operating expenses of $41.6 million, capital infrastructure costs of $29.6 million and $5.3 million for debt repayment.

=== Water rate ===
Effective April 2017, residential customers inside Des Moines pay $4.11/1000 gallons of water, and residents within Polk County almost twice as much, $8.10. A separate water availability fee varies depending on the meter size from $6 to $75 inside the city. For sewer service inside the city, the rate is $6.59 per 1,000 gallons, and outside the city it is $13.18 per 1,000 gallons. Stormwater services cost $11.50 per Equivalent Residential Unit. DMWW also bills on behalf of the Des Moines City Council for Solid Waste Services, its recycling program and yard waste.

== Governance ==
Under Iowa Code Section 388, the utility is owned by the water rate payers and operated by a Board of trustees, who are appointed by the Mayor of the city of Des Moines and approved by the city council. The Board of trustees has all the powers of the city council to run the utility, but cannot levy taxes. The Board of Trustees hires a General Manager to operate the utility, who prepares an annual budget using revenue from the sale of water as its primary income. The Board of trustees reviews, modifies, and approves it. It is the only body which can enter into contracts.

== See also ==
- Lists of public utilities
- List of United States water companies
