= Dale Maffitt Reservoir =

Reservoir in Iowa, United States

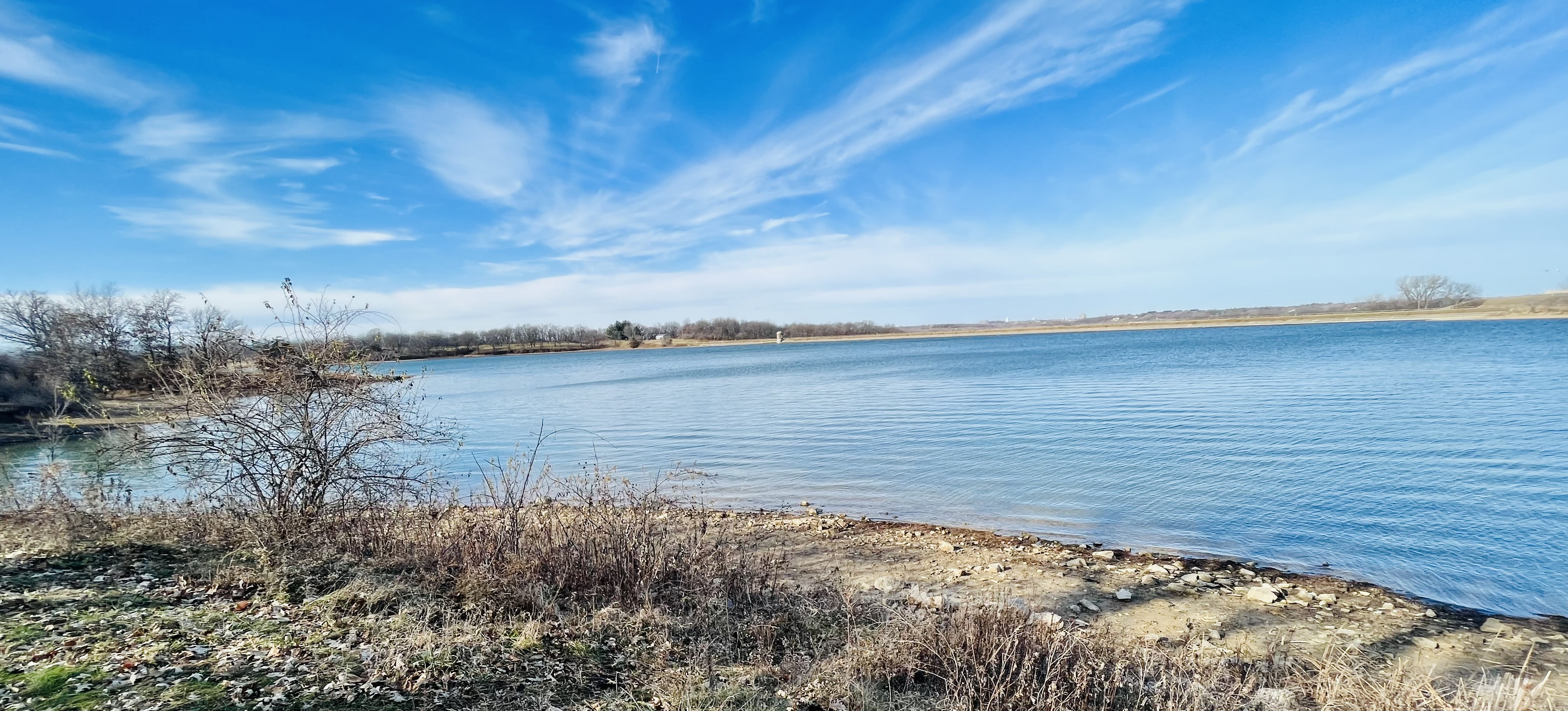
- Dale Maffitt Reservoir looking north toward the dam

- Location within Iowa Location within the United States
- Location: Iowa
- Coordinates: 41°31′01″N 93°47′31″W
- Type: reservoir
- Basin countries: United States
- Surface elevation: 920 ft (280 m)
- Website: Des Moines Water Works

Maffitt Lake is a reservoir in the four corners of Dallas County, Polk County, Warren County, and Madison County, Iowa.

It is owned by the Des Moines Water Works that serves as an emergency water supply for the city of Des Moines, Iowa. In a drought emergency, the level of the Raccoon River could be brought up by draining water from the lake into the river.

The main park area is named the Dale Maffit Reservoir and Arboretum. The park has a paved loop to a picnic area with lake access for kayaks and canoes. There are also hiking trails throughout the park. The picnic area has flush toilets that are open in the April through October.

The Gilfillan Family Cemetery is located near the entrance of the picnic area. This 19th century cemetery contains the remains of 10 early Polk County, Iowa settlers.
