= Natural gas =

Gaseous fossil fuel

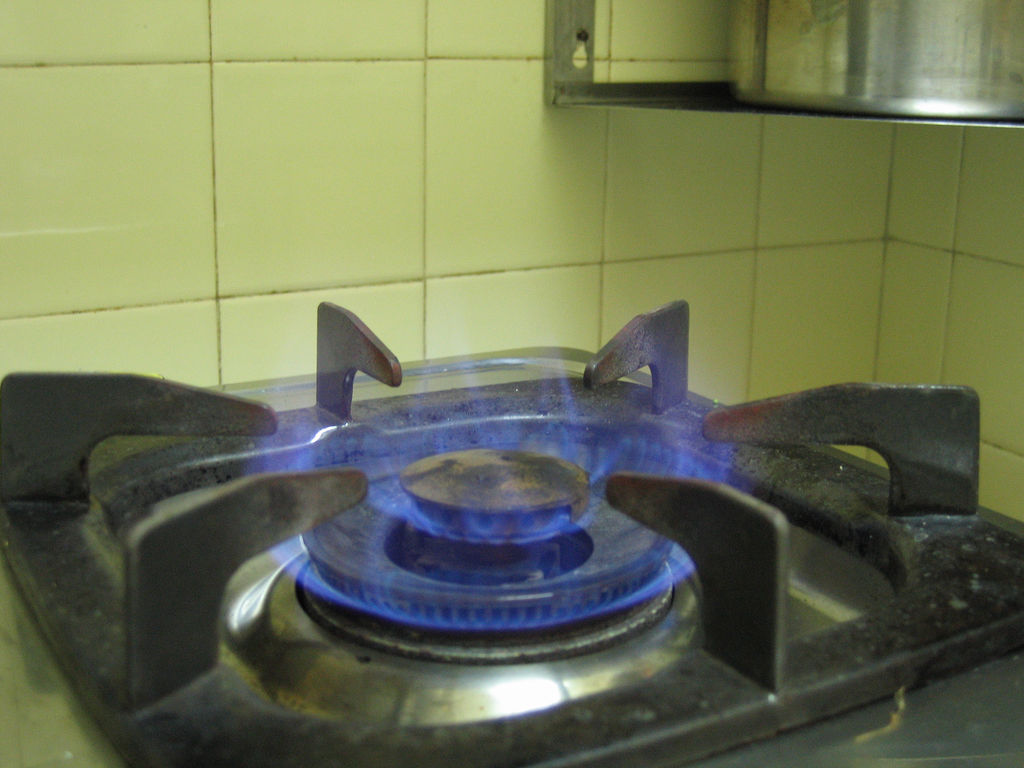
Natural gas burning on a gas stove

Natural gas (also gas, methane gas or fossil gas) is a fossil fuel, naturally occurring in geological formations. Typically, the gas is a mix of gaseous hydrocarbons, primarily methane (95%), small amounts of higher alkanes, and traces of carbon dioxide and nitrogen, hydrogen sulfide and helium. Methane is a colorless and odorless gas, and, after carbon dioxide, is the second-greatest greenhouse gas that contributes to global climate change. Because natural gas is odorless, a commercial odorizer, such as methanethiol, that smells of hydrogen sulfide (rotten eggs) is added to the gas for the ready detection of gas leaks.

Natural gas is a fossil fuel that is formed when layers of organic matter (primarily marine microorganisms) are thermally decomposed under oxygen-free conditions, subjected to intense heat and pressure underground over millions of years. The energy that the decayed organisms originally obtained from the sun via photosynthesis is stored as chemical energy within the molecules of methane and other hydrocarbons. Most natural gas is collected from underground geological formations, often alongside other fossil fuels like coal and oil (petroleum). Natural gas is often a byproduct of petroleum production, where it can either be vented without burning, flared (burned off) or collected.

The extraction and consumption of natural gas is a major industry. According to a 2025 IEA report, demand has increased in recent years. When burned for heat or electricity, natural gas emits fewer toxic air pollutants, less carbon dioxide, and almost no particulate matter compared to other fossil fuels. However, the natural gas industry is one of the largest drivers of climate change: gas venting and unintended fugitive emissions throughout the supply chain can result in natural gas having a similar or greater carbon footprint to other fossil fuels overall. Much of this is driven by methane's greater effect on radiative forcing. Globally, new installed natural gas infrastructure is one of the largest sources of increased greenhouse gas emissions for energy production. To meet climate goals, 2023 IPCC Sixth Assessment report concluded that new fossil gas infrastructure is only suitable under very specific conditions with carbon capture and fugitive gas prevention technologies, otherwise it risks emissions overshoot or becoming stranded assets.

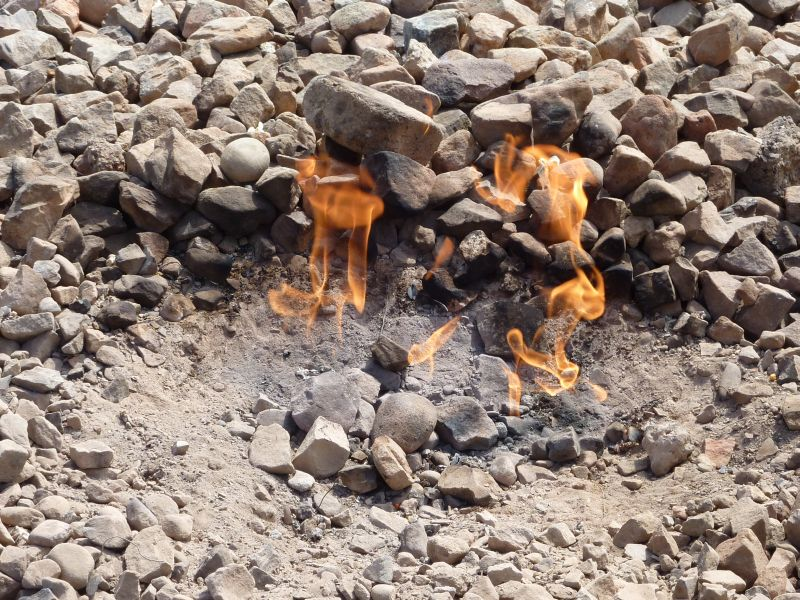
Burning of natural gas coming out of the ground

Before natural gas can be burned as a fuel or used in manufacturing processes, it almost always has to be processed to remove impurities such as water. The byproducts of this processing include ethane, propane, butanes, pentanes, and higher molecular weight hydrocarbons. Hydrogen sulfide (which may be converted into pure sulfur), carbon dioxide, water vapor, and sometimes helium and nitrogen must also be removed. While natural gas is frequently transported in a gaseous state in gas pipelines, inter-country transportation and long-term storage of natural gas was not widely available until the widespread adoption of liquefied natural gas.

Natural gas is measured in standard cubic meters or standard cubic feet. The density compared to air ranges from 0.58 (16.8 g/mole, 0.71 kg per standard cubic meter) to as high as 0.79 (22.9 g/mole, 0.97 kg per scm), but generally less than 0.64 (18.5 g/mole, 0.78 kg per scm). For comparison, pure methane (16.0425 g/mole) has a density 0.5539 times that of air (0.678 kg per standard cubic meter).

== Name ==
In the early 1800s, natural gas became known as "natural" to distinguish it from the dominant gas fuel at the time, coal gas. Unlike coal gas, which is manufactured by heating coal, natural gas can be extracted from the ground in its native gaseous form. When the use of natural gas overtook the use of coal gas in English-speaking countries in the 20th century, it was increasingly referred to as simply "gas". However, it is not to be confused with gasoline, which is also shortened in colloquial usage to "gas", especially in North America.

In order to highlight its role in exacerbating the climate crisis, however, many organizations have criticized the continued use of the word "natural" in referring to the gas. These advocates prefer the term "fossil gas" or "methane gas" as better conveying to the public its climate threat. A 2020 study of Americans' perceptions of the fuel found that, across political identifications, the term "methane gas" led to better estimates of its harms and risks.

== History ==
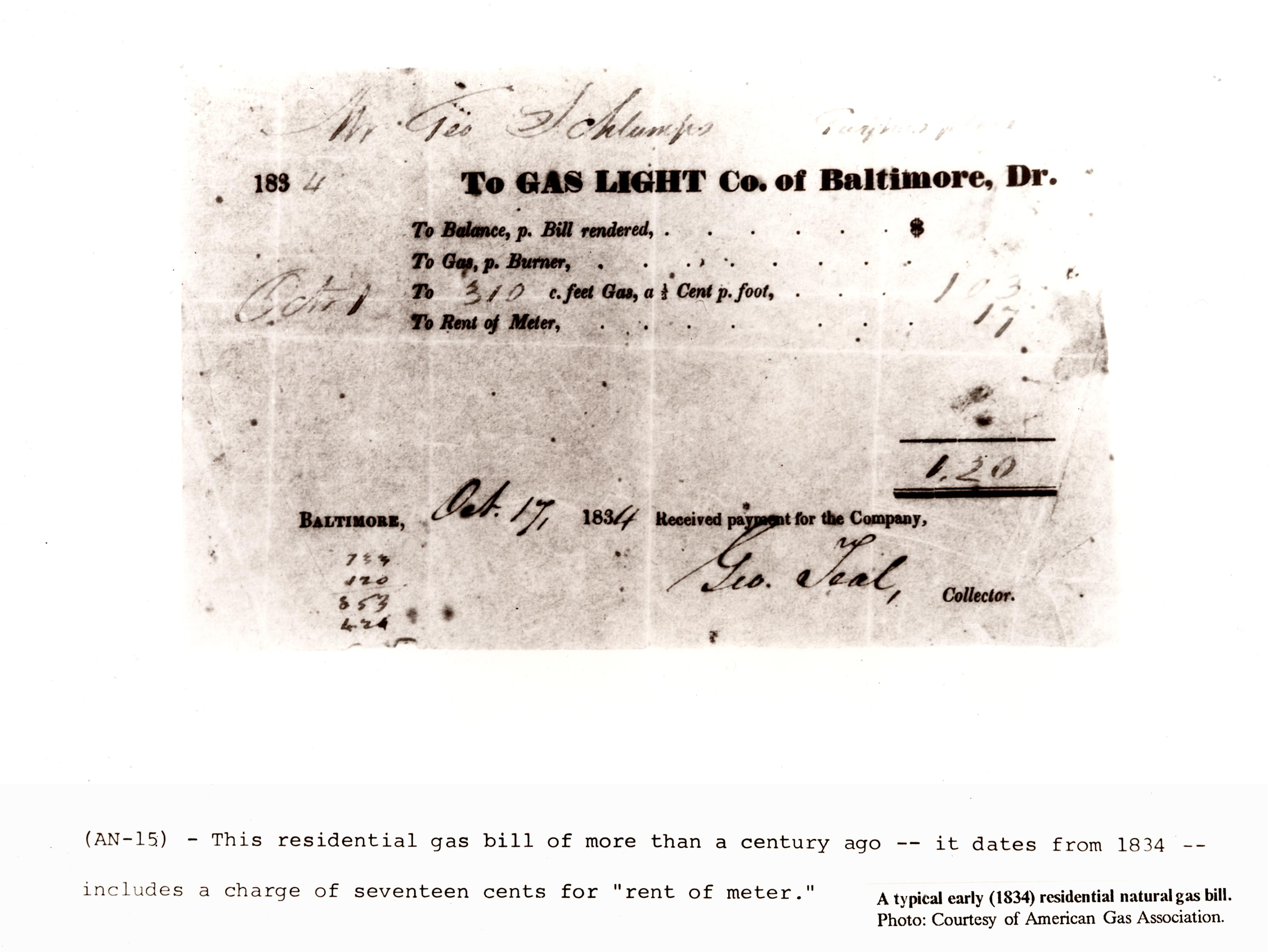
A gas bill from Baltimore, Maryland, 1834, for manufactured coal gas, before the introduction of ground-extracted methane gas.

Natural gas can come out of the ground and cause a long-burning fire. In ancient Greece, the gas flames at Mount Chimaera contributed to the legend of the fire-breathing creature Chimera. In ancient China, gas resulting from the drilling for brines was first used by about 400 BC. The Chinese transported gas seeping from the ground in crude pipelines of bamboo to where it was used to boil salt water to extract the salt in the Ziliujing District of Sichuan.

Natural gas was not widely used before the development of long distance pipelines in the early 20th century. Before that, most use was near to the source of the well, and the predominant gas for fuel and lighting during the industrial revolution was manufactured coal gas.

The history of natural gas in the United States begins with localized use. In the seventeenth century, French missionaries witnessed the American Indians setting fire to natural gas seeps around Lake Erie, and scattered observations of these seeps were made by European-descended settlers throughout the eastern seaboard through the 1700s. In 1821, William Hart dug the first commercial natural gas well in the United States at Fredonia, New York, United States, which led in 1858 to the formation of the Fredonia Gas Light Company. Further such ventures followed near wells in other states, until technological innovations allowed the growth of major long distance pipelines from the 1920s onwards.

By 2010, 66,000 km^{3} (16,000 mi^{3}) (or 8%) had been used out of the total 850,000 km^{3} (200,000 mi^{3}) of estimated remaining recoverable reserves of natural gas.

== Sources ==
=== Natural gas ===
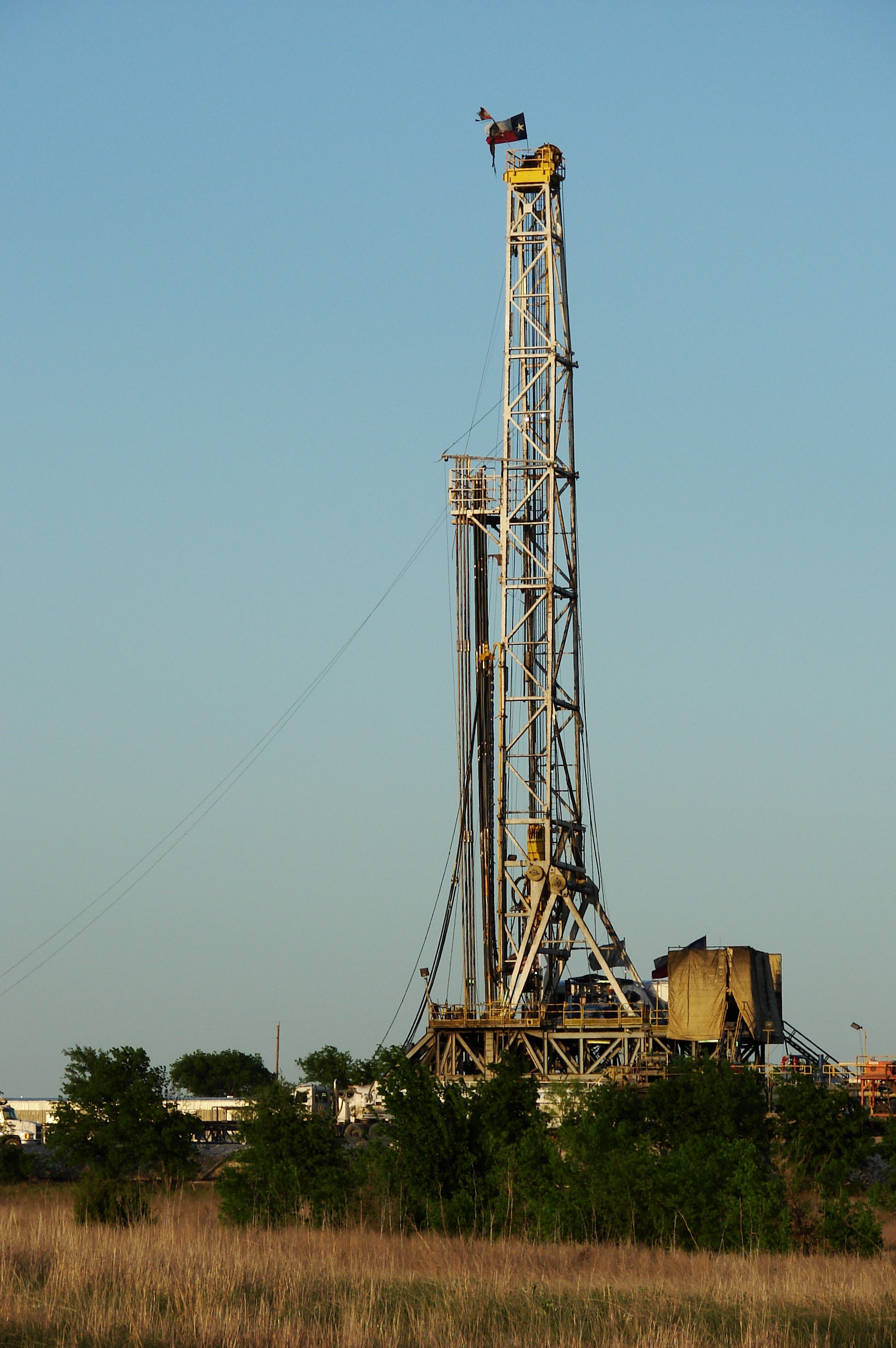
Natural gas drilling rig in Texas, US

In the 19th century, natural gas was primarily obtained as a by-product of producing oil. The small, light gas carbon chains came out of solution as the extracted fluids underwent pressure reduction from the reservoir to the surface, similar to uncapping a soft drink bottle where the carbon dioxide effervesces. The gas was often viewed as a by-product, a hazard, and a disposal problem in active oil fields. The large volumes produced could not be used until relatively expensive pipeline and storage facilities were constructed to deliver the gas to consumer markets.

Until the early part of the 20th century, most natural gas associated with oil was either simply released or burned off at oil fields. Gas venting and production flaring are still practiced in modern times, but efforts are ongoing around the world to retire them, and to replace them with other commercially viable and useful alternatives.

In addition to transporting gas via pipelines for use in power generation, other end uses for natural gas include export as liquefied natural gas (LNG) or conversion of natural gas into other liquid products via gas to liquids (GTL) technologies. GTL technologies can convert natural gas into liquids products such as gasoline, diesel or jet fuel. A variety of GTL technologies have been developed, including Fischer–Tropsch (F–T), methanol to gasoline (MTG) and syngas to gasoline plus (STG+). F–T produces a synthetic crude that can be further refined into finished products, while MTG can produce synthetic gasoline from natural gas. STG+ can produce drop-in gasoline, diesel, jet fuel and aromatic chemicals directly from natural gas via a single-loop process. In 2011, Royal Dutch Shell's 140,000 barrels (22,000 m^{3}) per day F–T plant went into operation in Qatar.

Natural gas can be "associated" (found in oil fields), or "non-associated" (isolated in natural gas fields), and is also found in coal beds (as coalbed methane). It sometimes contains a significant amount of ethane, propane, butane, and pentane—heavier hydrocarbons removed for commercial use prior to the methane being sold as a consumer fuel or chemical plant feedstock. Non-hydrocarbons such as carbon dioxide, nitrogen, helium (rarely), and hydrogen sulfide must also be removed before the natural gas can be transported.

Natural gas extracted from oil wells is called casinghead gas (whether or not truly produced up the annulus and through a casinghead outlet) or associated gas. The natural gas industry is extracting an increasing quantity of gas from challenging, unconventional resource types: sour gas, tight gas, shale gas, and coalbed methane.

There is some disagreement on which country has the largest proven gas reserves. Sources that consider that Russia has by far the largest proven reserves include the US Central Intelligence Agency (47,600 km^{3}) and Energy Information Administration (47,800 km^{3}), as well as the Organization of Petroleum Exporting Countries (48,700 km^{3}). Contrarily, BP credits Russia with only 32,900 km^{3}, which would place it in second, slightly behind Iran (33,100 to 33,800 km^{3}, depending on the source).

Countries' proven natural gas reserves (2014), based on data from The World Factbook

It is estimated that there are about 900,000 km^{3} of "unconventional" gas such as shale gas, of which 180,000 km^{3} may be recoverable. In turn, many studies from MIT, Black & Veatch and the US Department of Energy predict that natural gas will account for a larger portion of electricity generation and heat in the future.

The world's largest gas field is the offshore South Pars/North Dome Gas-Condensate field, shared between Iran and Qatar. It is estimated to have 51,000 cubic kilometers (12,000 mi^{3}) of natural gas and 50 billion barrels (7.9 billion cubic meters) of natural gas condensates.

Because natural gas is not a pure product, as the reservoir pressure drops when non-associated gas is extracted from a field under supercritical (pressure/temperature) conditions, the higher molecular weight components may partially condense upon isothermic depressurizing—an effect called retrograde condensation. The liquid thus formed may get trapped as the pores of the gas reservoir get depleted. One method to deal with this problem is to re-inject dried gas free of condensate to maintain the underground pressure and to allow re-evaporation and extraction of condensates. More frequently, the liquid condenses at the surface, and one of the tasks of the gas plant is to collect this condensate. The resulting liquid is called natural gas condensate and has commercial value.

=== Shale gas ===
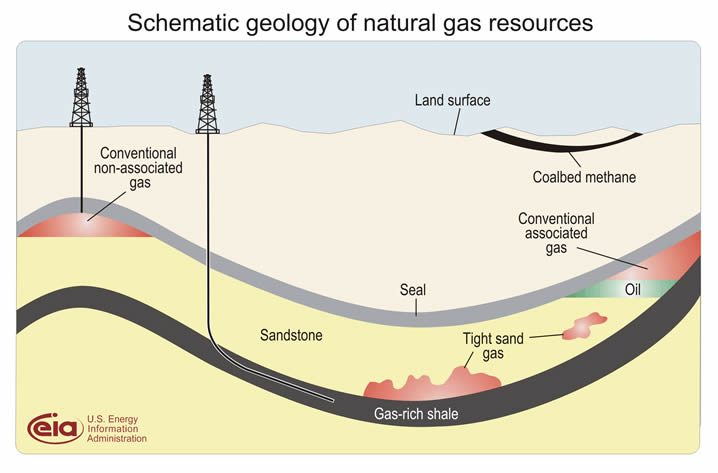
The location of shale gas compared to other types of gas deposits

Shale gas is natural gas produced from shale. Because shale's matrix permeability is too low to allow gas to flow in economical quantities, shale gas wells depend on fractures to allow the gas to flow. Early shale gas wells depended on natural fractures through which gas flowed; almost all shale gas wells today require fractures artificially created by hydraulic fracturing. Since 2000, shale gas has become a major source of natural gas in the United States and Canada. Because of increased shale gas production the United States was in 2014 the number one natural gas producer in the world. The production of shale gas in the United States has been described as a "shale gas revolution" and as "one of the landmark events in the 21st century."

Following the increased production in the United States, shale gas exploration is beginning in countries such as Poland, China, and South Africa. Chinese geologists have identified the Sichuan Basin as a promising target for shale gas drilling, because of the similarity of shales to those that have proven productive in the United States. Production from the Wei-201 well is between 10,000 and 20,000 m^{3} per day. In late 2020, China National Petroleum Corporation claimed daily production of 20 million cubic meters of gas from its Changning-Weiyuan demonstration zone.

=== Coal gas ===
Coal gas or Town gas is a flammable gaseous fuel made by the destructive distillation of coal. It contains a variety of calorific gases including hydrogen, carbon monoxide, methane, and other volatile hydrocarbons, together with small quantities of non-calorific gases such as carbon dioxide and nitrogen, and was used in a similar way to natural gas. This is a historical technology and is not usually economically competitive with other sources of fuel gas today.

Most town "gashouses" located in the eastern US in the late 19th and early 20th centuries were simple by-product coke ovens that heated bituminous coal in air-tight chambers. The gas driven off from the coal was collected and distributed through networks of pipes to residences and other buildings where it was used for cooking and lighting. (Gas heating did not come into widespread use until the last half of the 20th century.) The coal tar (or asphalt) that collected in the bottoms of the gashouse ovens was often used for roofing and other waterproofing purposes, and when mixed with sand and gravel was used for paving streets.

=== Synthetic natural gas ===
Synthetic natural gas (SNG), is a fuel gas (predominantly methane, CH4) that can be produced from fossil fuels such as lignite coal, oil shale, or from biofuels or using electricity with power-to-gas system. Gasification process is used to generate SNG. When the gasification is conducted with hydrogen in place of oxygen/air, it is called hydrogasification.

=== Renewable natural gas ===
Renewable natural gas (RNG), also known as biomethane, is a renewable fuel made from biogas that has been upgraded to a quality similar to fossil gas and has a methane concentration of 90% or greater.

=== Crystallized natural gas – clathrates ===
Huge quantities of natural gas (primarily methane) exist in the form of clathrates under sediment on offshore continental shelves and on land in arctic regions that experience permafrost, such as those in Siberia. Hydrates require a combination of high pressure and low temperature to form.

In 2013, Japan Oil, Gas and Metals National Corporation (JOGMEC) announced that they had recovered commercially relevant quantities of natural gas from methane hydrate.

== Processing ==
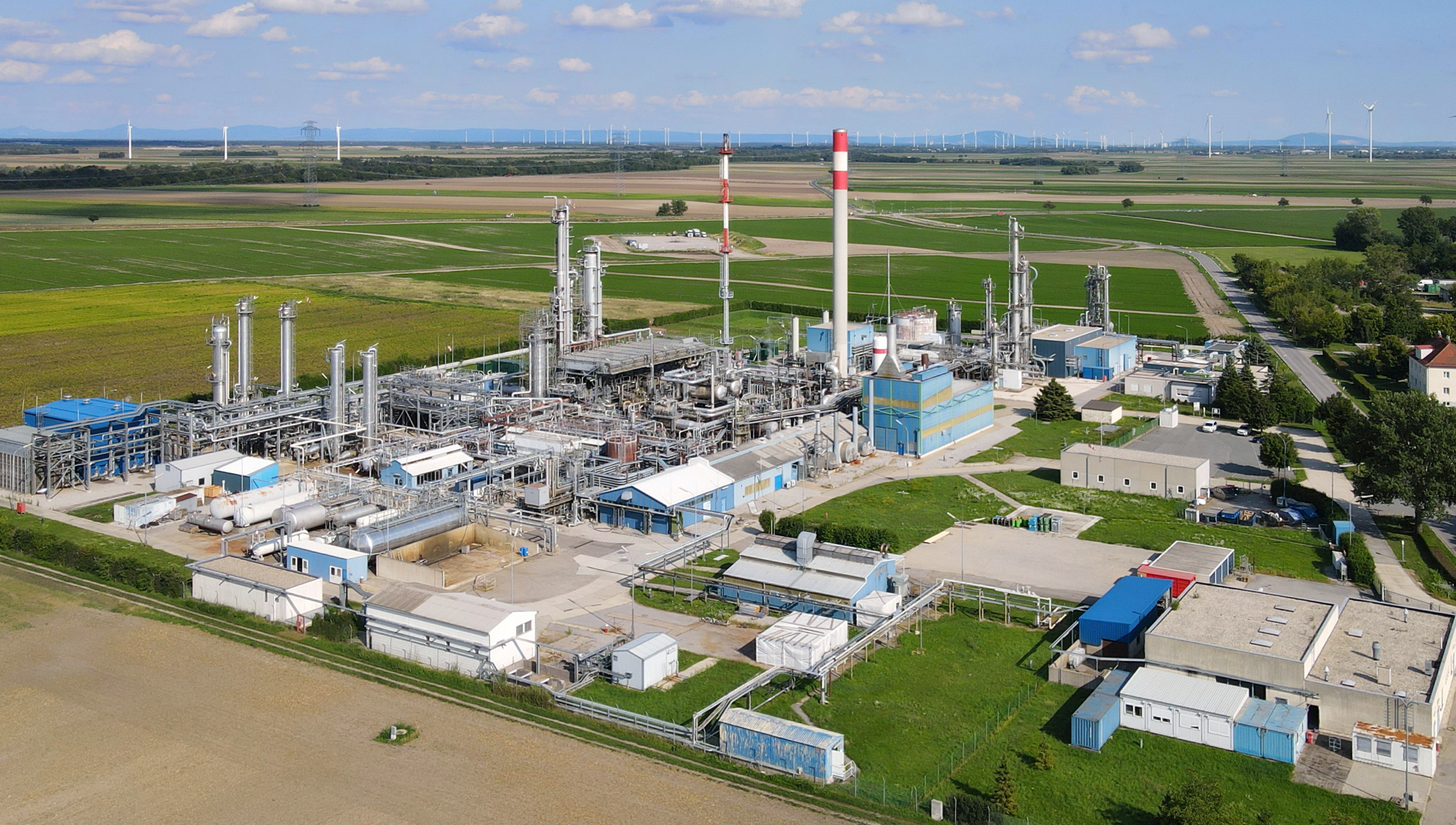
Natural gas processing plant in Aderklaa, Lower Austria

The image below is a schematic block flow diagram of a typical natural gas processing plant. It shows the various unit processes used to convert raw natural gas into sales gas pipelined to the end user markets.

The block flow diagram also shows how processing of the raw natural gas yields byproduct sulfur, byproduct ethane, and natural gas liquids (NGL) propane, butanes and natural gasoline (denoted as pentanes +).

Schematic flow diagram of a typical natural gas processing plant

== Demand ==
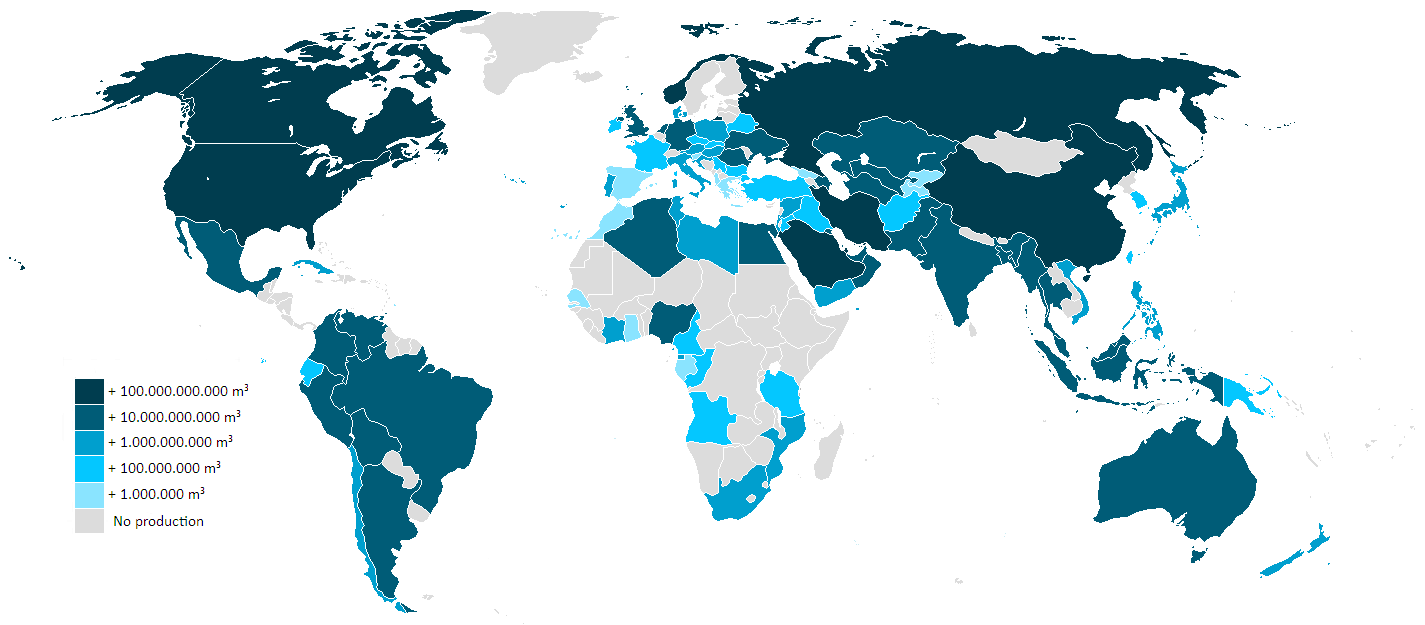
Natural gas extraction by countries in cubic meters per year around 2013

As of mid-2020, natural gas production in the US had peaked three times, with current levels exceeding both previous peaks. It reached 24.1 trillion cubic feet per year in 1973, followed by a decline, and reached 24.5 trillion cubic feet in 2001. After a brief drop, withdrawals increased nearly every year since 2006 (owing to the shale gas boom), with 2017 production at 33.4 trillion cubic feet and 2019 production at 40.7 trillion cubic feet. After the third peak in December 2019, extraction continued to fall from March onward due to decreased demand caused by the COVID-19 pandemic in the US.

The 2021 global energy crisis was driven by a global surge in demand as the world quit the economic recession caused by COVID-19, particularly due to strong energy demand in Asia.

== Storage and transport ==
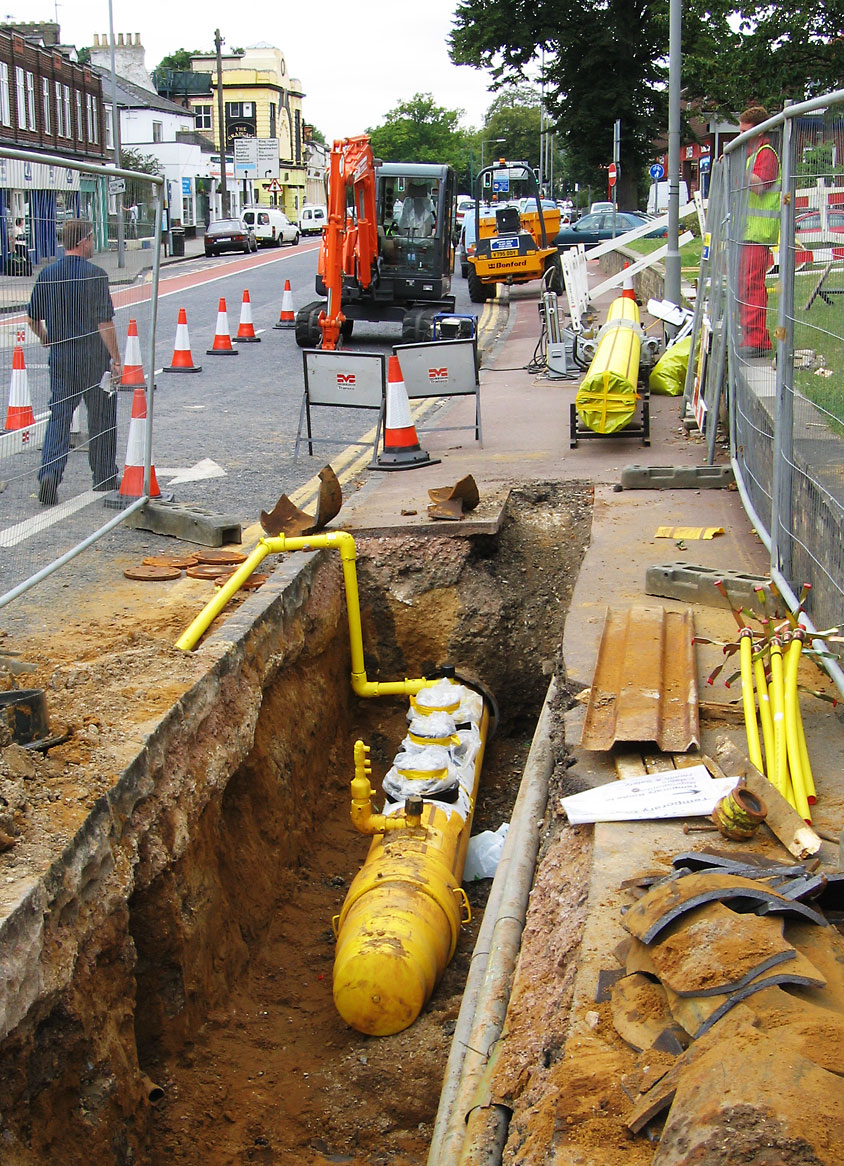
Polyethylene plastic main being placed in a trench

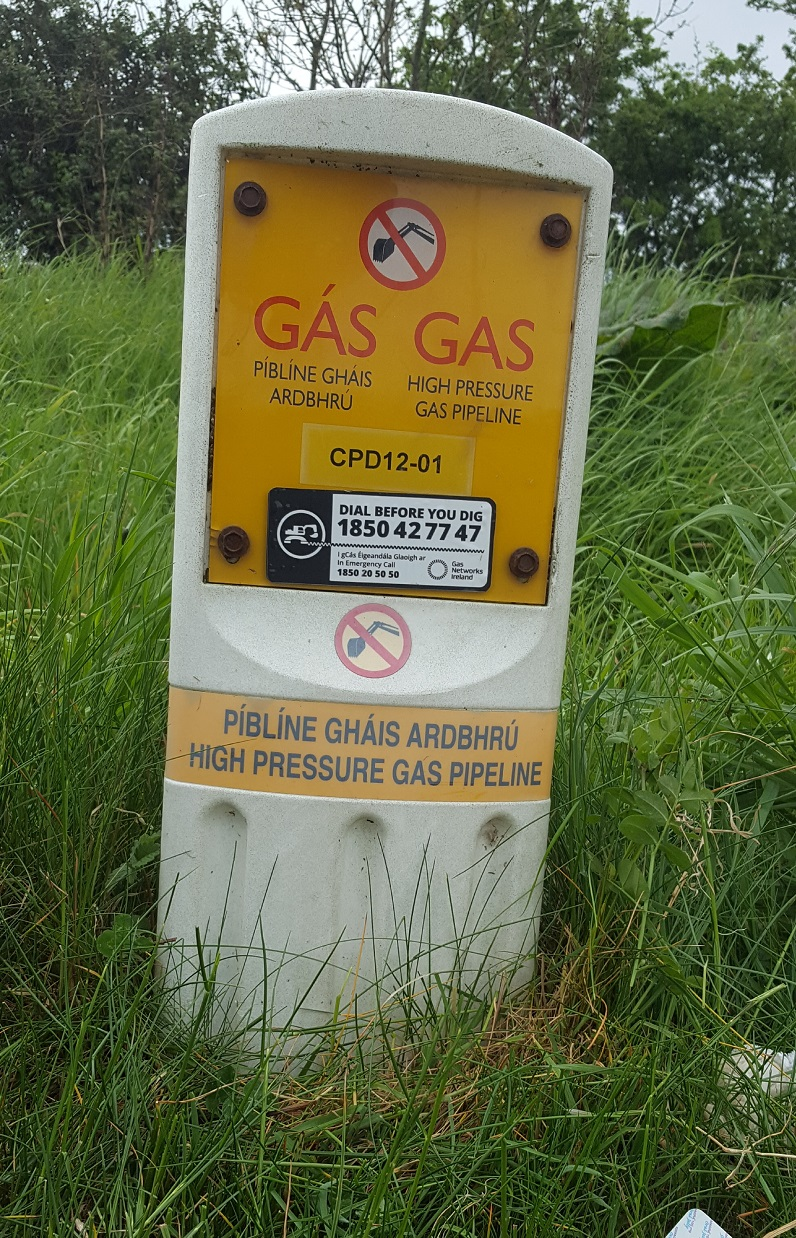
Construction close to high-pressure gas-transmission pipelines is discouraged, often with standing warning signs.

Due to its low density, it is not easy to store natural gas or to transport it by vehicle. Natural gas pipelines are impractical across oceans, since the gas needs to be cooled down and compressed, as the friction in the pipeline causes the gas to heat up. Many existing pipelines in the US are close to reaching their capacity, prompting some politicians representing northern states to speak of potential shortages. The large trade cost implies that natural gas markets are globally much less integrated, causing significant price differences across countries. In Western Europe, the gas pipeline network is already dense. New pipelines are planned or under construction between Western Europe and the Near East or Northern Africa.

Whenever gas is bought or sold at custody transfer points, rules and agreements are made regarding the gas quality. These may include the maximum allowable concentration of CO_{2}, H_{2}S and H_{2}O. Usually sales quality gas that has been treated to remove contamination is traded on a "dry gas" basis and is required to be commercially free from objectionable odours, materials, and dust or other solid or liquid matter, waxes, gums and gum forming constituents, which might damage or adversely affect operation of equipment downstream of the custody transfer point.

Based on their geographic origin, H-gas (high-calorific gas) and L-gas (low-calorific gas) are to be distinguished. Both types require separate transport, leading to two separate pipeline networks, e.g. in parts of Germany (with a strengthened focus and transition towards H-gas, as the L-gas reservoirs in Germany and the Netherlands are declining).

=== Liquefied natural gas ===
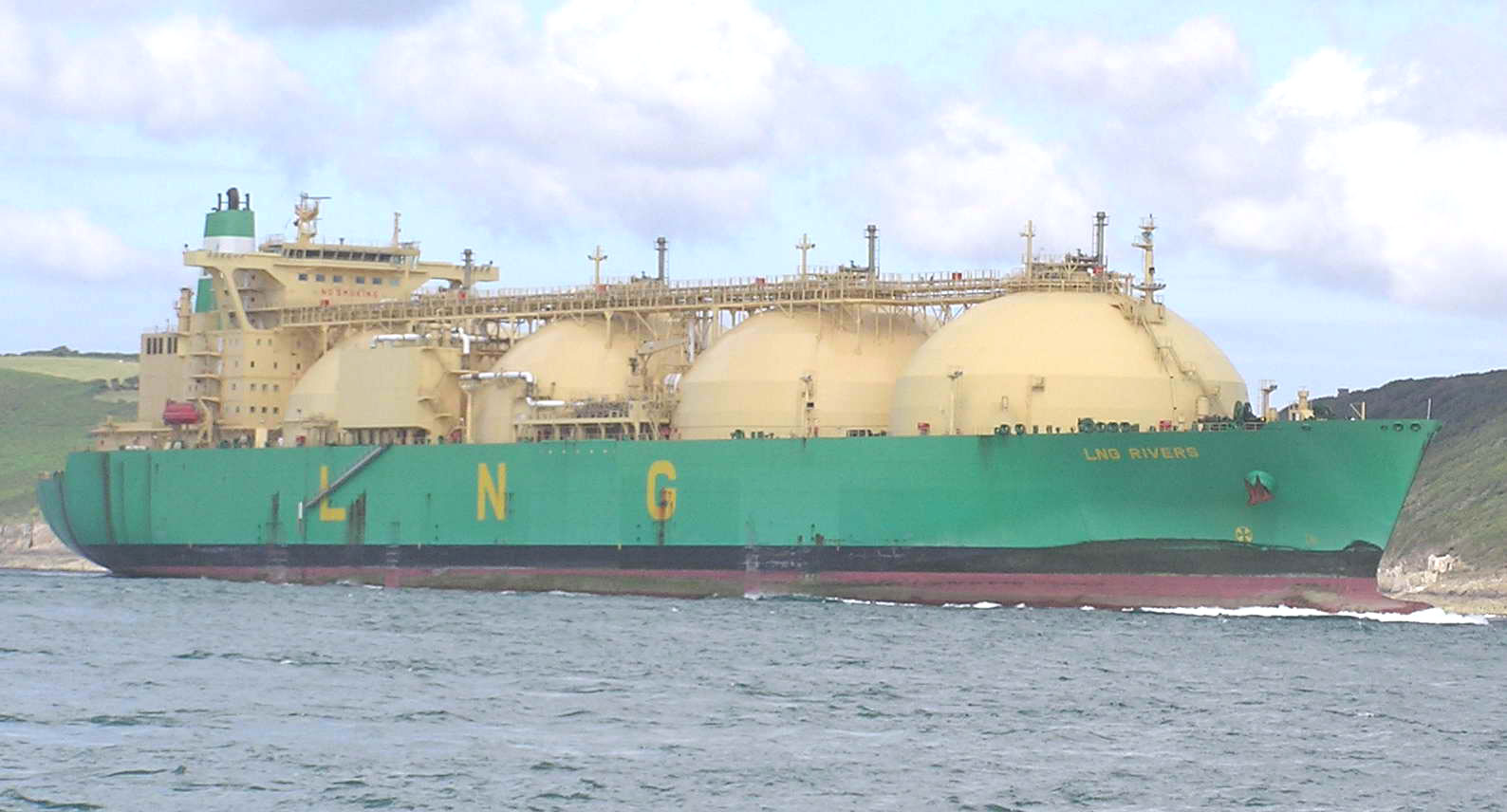
LNG carrier

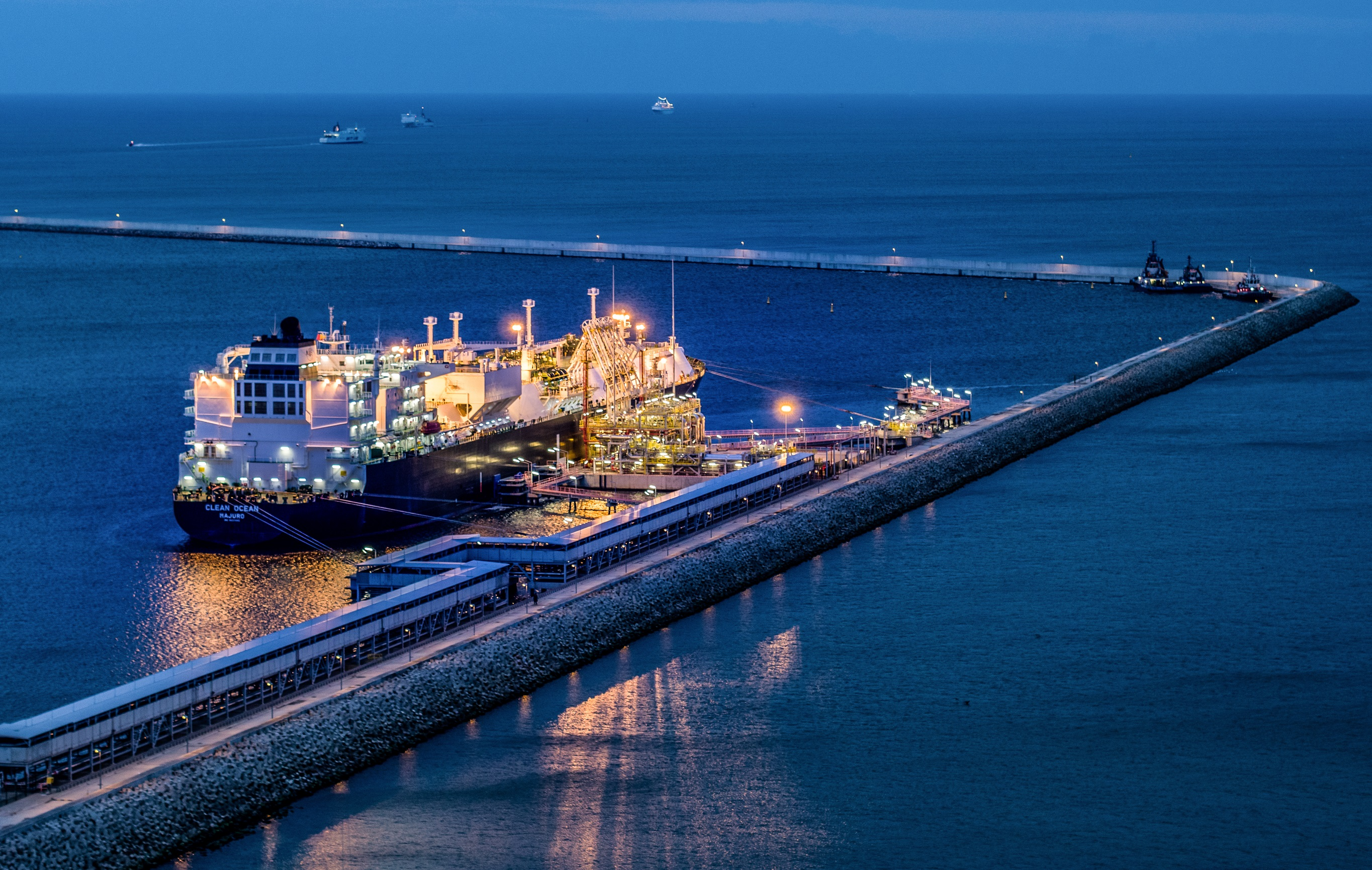
A liquefied natural gas ship at Świnoujście LNG terminal in Poland

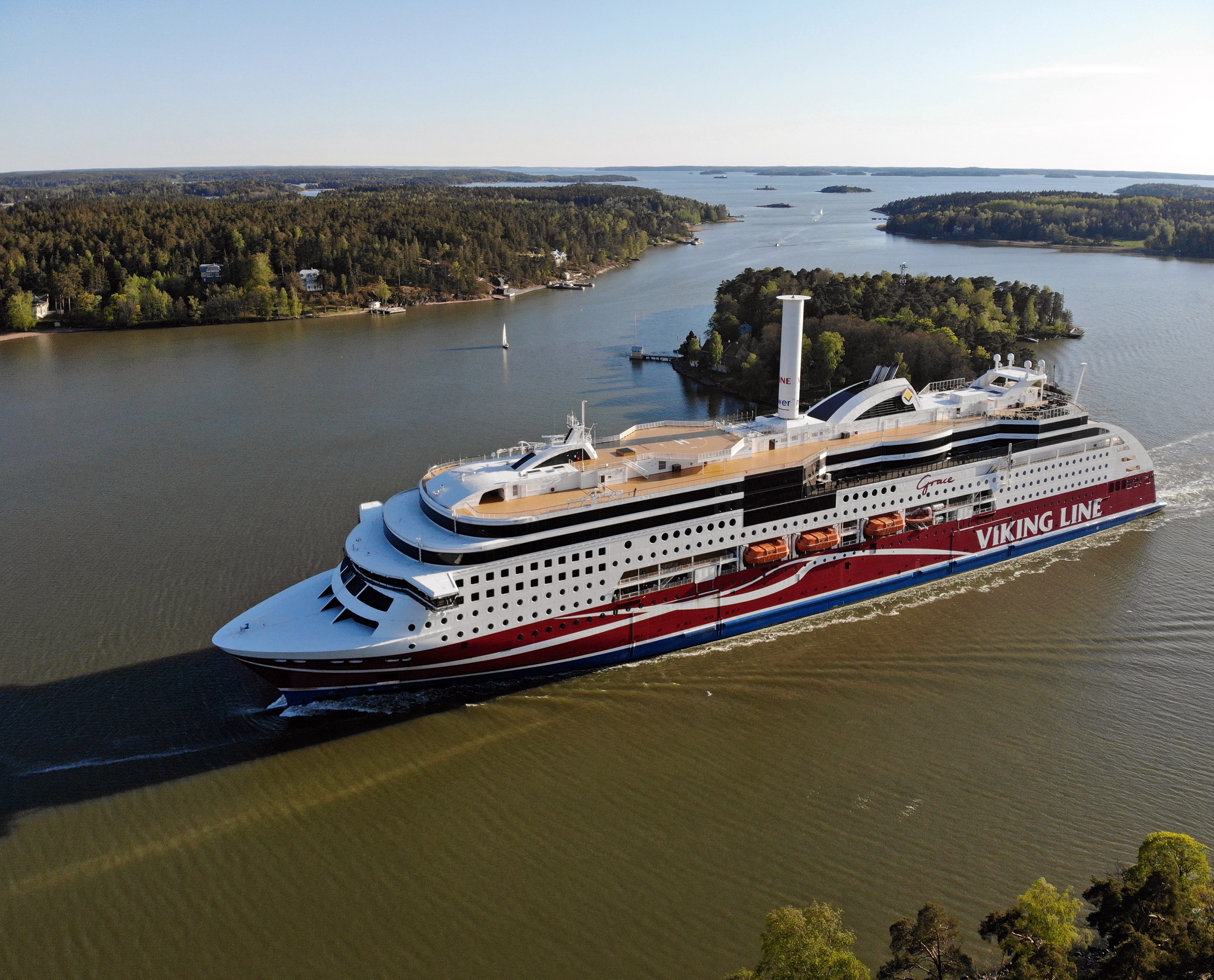
The passenger ship MS Viking Grace, the world's first large-scale passenger ship to be powered with liquefied natural gas

Liquefied natural gas (sometimes liquid natural gas, frequently LNG) is natural gas (predominantly methane, CH_{4}, with some mixture of ethane, C_{2}H_{6}) that has been cooled to liquid form for ease and safety of non-pressurized storage or transport. It takes up approximately 1/600th the volume of natural gas in the gaseous state at standard temperature and pressure.

LNG is odorless, colorless, non-toxic, and non-corrosive. Hazards include flammability after vaporization into a gaseous state, freezing and asphyxiation. The liquefaction process involves removal of certain components, such as dust, carbon dioxide, helium, water, and heavy hydrocarbons, which could cause process upsets downstream. The natural gas is then condensed into a liquid at close to atmospheric pressure by cooling it to approximately −162 °C (−260 °F); maximum transport pressure is set at around 127 kPa (18 psi), which is approximately 1.25 times atmospheric pressure at sea level. The gas stream is typically separated into the liquefied petroleum fractions (butane and propane) and the lighter ethane and methane fractions. These lighter fractions of methane and ethane make up the bulk of LNG that is liquefied and stored.

Before the late 20th century natural gas was largely considered a byproduct of oil production. The development of production processes, cryogenic storage, and transportation made it possible to commercialize natural gas, creating a global market which now competes with other fuels. The development of LNG storage made natural gas transportation much more reliable. Unlike simple tank storage used for other fuels, natural gas previously could not be stored for extended periods due to the difficulty of preventing gas leakage. Large-scale cryogenic storage made it possible to create reliable long-term storage reserves for natural gas as well. These reserves of liquefied gas could be quickly deployed through regasification processes, and today are the main means for networks to handle local peak shaving requirements.

Production of LNG is an energy intensive process concentrated in a few countries, and typically requires specialized ports for handling the export of the LNG for use in other countries. As of 2023, the United States, Australia and Qatar had the most capacity for exporting LNG, and China, Japan, and South Korea were the biggest importers. A 2025 report by the IEA found that more capacity would be coming on in the upcoming decade. This hyper-concentration of production creates choke points in global supply chains, with the 2026 Iran war affecting Qatar's LNG exports, causing a ripple effect in LNG access and cost.

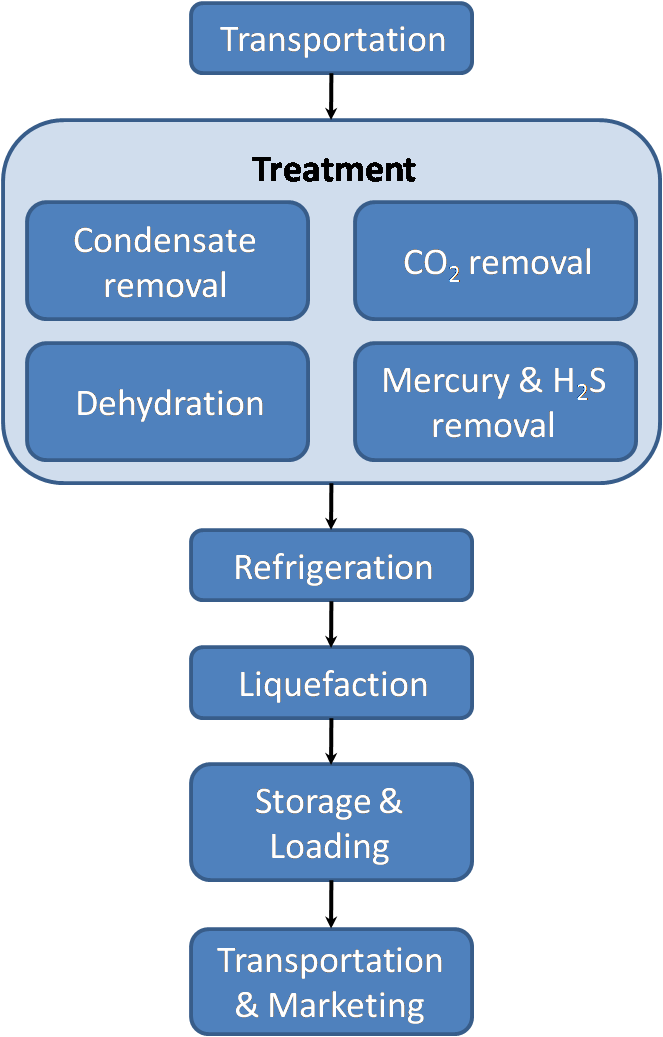
A typical LNG process

=== Compressed Natural gas ===
CNG is transported at high pressure, typically above 200 bars (20,000 kPa; 2,900 psi). Compressors and decompression equipment are less capital intensive and may be economical in smaller unit sizes than liquefaction/regasification plants. Natural gas trucks and carriers may transport natural gas directly to end-users, or to distribution points such as pipelines.

=== Flaring ===
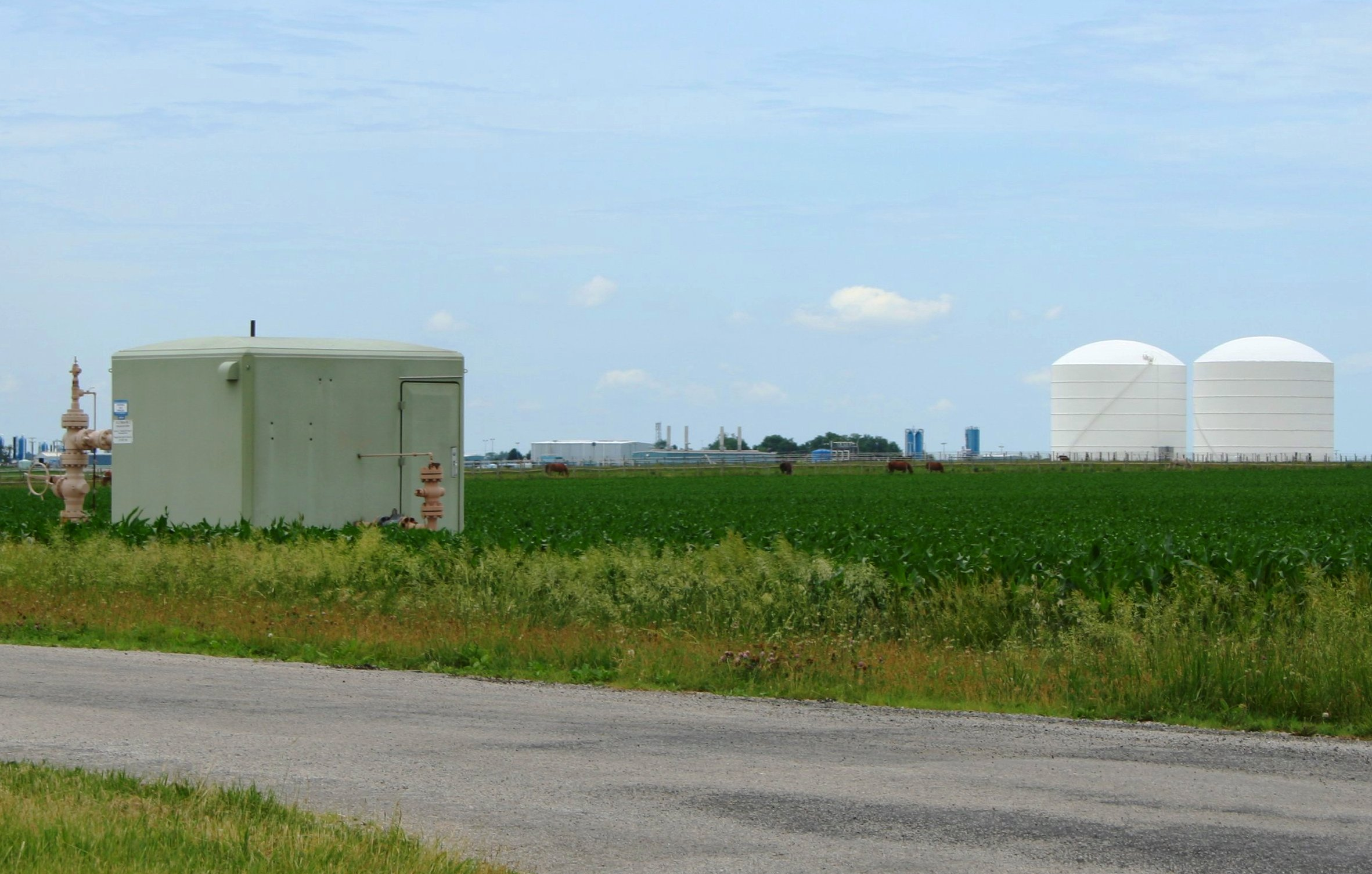
Peoples Gas Manlove Field natural gas storage area in Newcomb Township, Champaign County, Illinois. In the foreground (left) is one of the numerous wells for the underground storage area, with an LNG plant, and above-ground storage tanks are in the background (right).

In the past, the natural gas which was recovered in the course of recovering petroleum could not be profitably sold, and was simply burned at the oil field in a process known as flaring. Flaring is now illegal in many countries. Additionally, higher demand in the last 20–30 years has made production of gas associated with oil economically viable. As a further option, the gas is now sometimes re-injected into the formation for enhanced oil recovery by pressure maintenance as well as miscible or immiscible flooding. Conservation, re-injection, or flaring of natural gas associated with oil is primarily dependent on proximity to markets (pipelines), and regulatory restrictions.

Natural gas can be indirectly exported through the absorption in other physical output. The expansion of shale gas production in the US has caused prices to drop relative to other countries. This has caused a boom in energy intensive manufacturing sector exports, whereby the average dollar unit of US manufacturing exports has almost tripled its energy content between 1996 and 2012.

A "master gas system" was invented in Saudi Arabia in the late 1970s, ending any necessity for flaring. Satellite and nearby infra-red camera observations, however, shows that flaring and venting are still happening in some countries.

Similarly, some landfills that also discharge methane gases have been set up to capture the methane and generate electricity.

=== Salt domes and underground storage ===
Natural gas is often stored underground [references about geological storage needed]inside depleted gas reservoirs from previous gas wells, salt domes, or in tanks as liquefied natural gas. The gas is injected in a time of low demand and extracted when demand picks up. Storage nearby end users helps to meet volatile demands, but such storage may not always be practicable.

=== Floating liquefied natural gas ===
Floating liquefied natural gas (FLNG) is an innovative technology designed to enable the development of offshore gas resources that would otherwise remain untapped due to environmental or economic factors which currently make them impractical to develop via a land-based LNG operation. FLNG technology also provides a number of environmental and economic advantages:

- Environmental – Because all processing is done at the gas field, there is no requirement for long pipelines to shore, compression units to pump the gas to shore, dredging and jetty construction, and onshore construction of an LNG processing plant, which significantly reduces the environmental footprint. Avoiding construction also helps preserve marine and coastal environments. In addition, environmental disturbance will be minimised during decommissioning because the facility can easily be disconnected and removed before being refurbished and re-deployed elsewhere.
- Economic – Where pumping gas to shore can be prohibitively expensive, FLNG makes development economically viable. As a result, it will open up new business opportunities for countries to develop offshore gas fields that would otherwise remain stranded, such as those offshore East Africa.

Many gas and oil companies are considering the economic and environmental benefits of floating liquefied natural gas (FLNG). There are currently projects underway to construct five FLNG facilities. Petronas is close to completion on their FLNG-1 at Daewoo Shipbuilding and Marine Engineering and are underway on their FLNG-2 project at Samsung Heavy Industries. Shell Prelude is due to start production 2017. The Browse LNG project will commence FEED in 2019.

== Uses ==
Natural gas is primarily used in the northern hemisphere. North America and Europe are major consumers.

Well-head gases often require removal of various hydrocarbon molecules contained within the gas. Some of these gases include heptane, pentane, propane and other hydrocarbons with molecular weights above methane (CH_{4}). The natural gas transmission lines extend to the natural gas processing plant or unit which removes the higher-molecular weight hydrocarbons to produce natural gas with energy content between 35–39 megajoules per cubic metre (950–1,050 British thermal units per cubic foot). The processed natural gas may then be used for residential, commercial and industrial uses.

=== Mid-stream natural gas ===
Natural gas flowing in the distribution lines is called mid-stream natural gas and is often used to power engines which rotate compressors. These compressors are required in the transmission line to pressurize and repressurize the mid-stream natural gas as the gas travels. Typically, natural gas powered engines require 35–39 MJ/m^{3} (950–1,050 BTU/ft^{3}) natural gas to operate at the rotational name plate specifications. Several methods are used to remove these higher molecular weighted gases for use by the natural gas engine. A few technologies are as follows:

- Joule–Thomson skid
- Cryogenic or chiller system
- Chemical enzymology system

=== Power generation ===
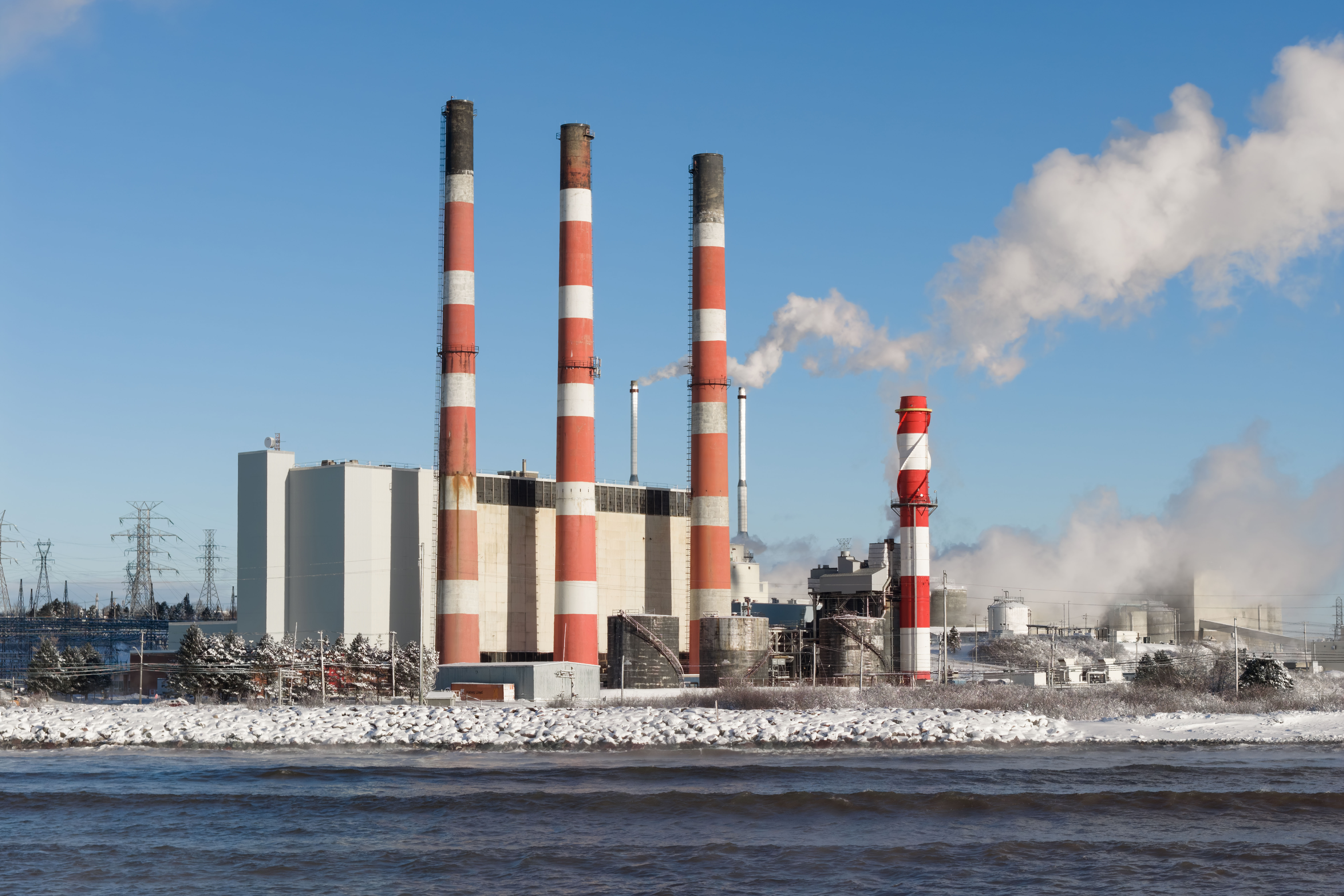
A natural gas plant in Canada

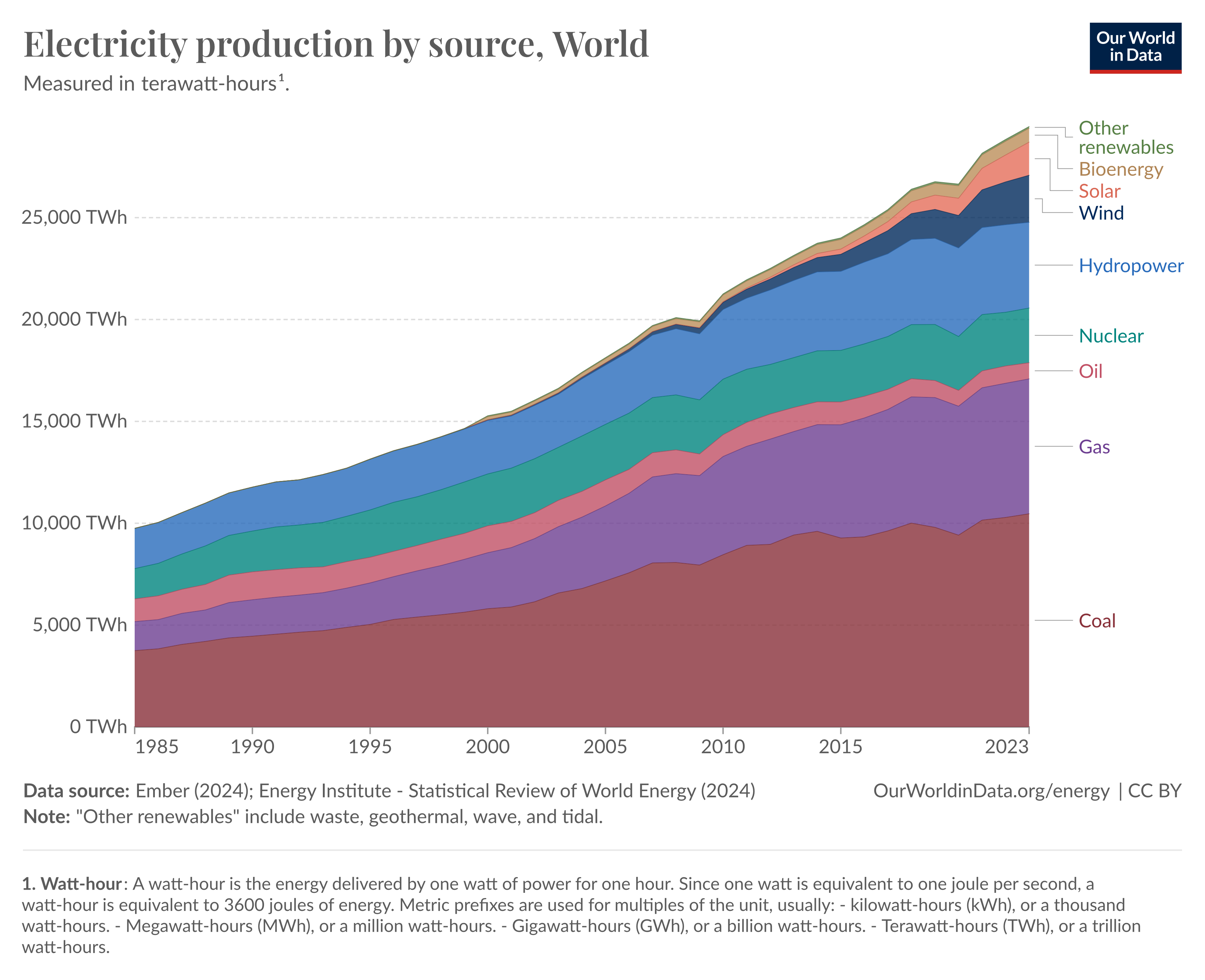
Gas generates over 20% of world electricity

Share of electricity production from gas

A gas-fired power plant, sometimes referred to as gas-fired power station, natural gas power plant, or methane gas power plant, is a thermal power station that burns natural gas to generate electricity. Gas-fired power plants generate almost a quarter of world electricity and are significant sources of greenhouse gas emissions.

Most energy planning relies on gas fired plants to provide dispatchable energy generation to compensate for variable renewable energy deficits, where hydropower or interconnectors are not available. In the early 2020s batteries became competitive with gas peaker plants.

Some natural gas plants are dual fire with other kinds of fuels, such as oil, coal or hydrogen. Most analysts don't think natural gas turbines will be successfully converted to hydrogen as part of the energy transition, becoming a stranded asset.

=== Domestic use ===
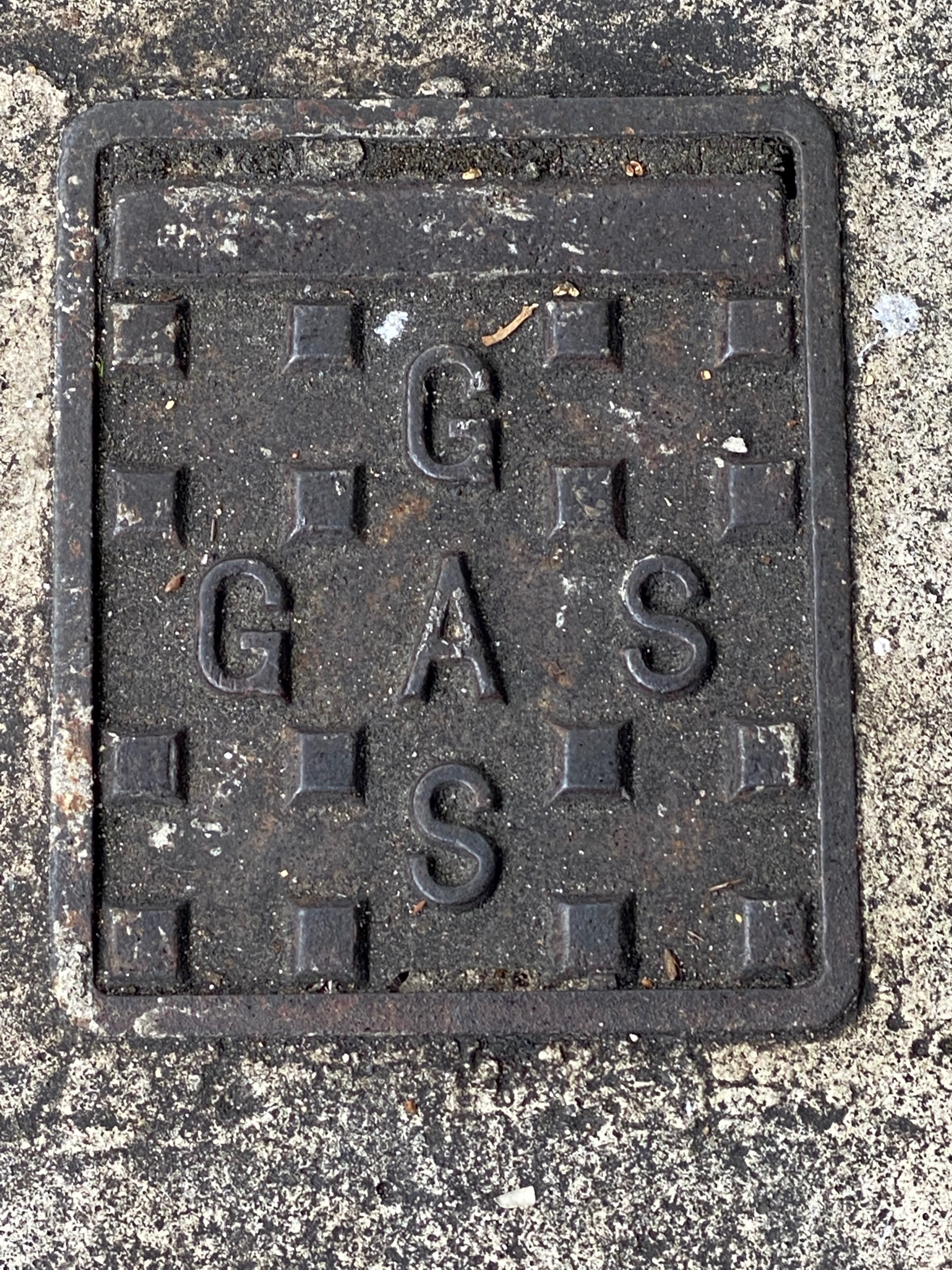
Manhole for domestic gas supply, London, UK

In the US, over one-third of households (>40 million homes) cook with gas. Natural gas dispensed in a residential setting can generate temperatures in excess of 1,100 °C (2,000 °F) making it a powerful domestic cooking and heating fuel. Stanford scientists estimated that gas stoves emit 0.8–1.3% of the gas they use as unburned methane and that total U.S. stove emissions are 28.1 gigagrams of methane. In much of the developed world it is supplied through pipes to homes, where it is used for many purposes including ranges and ovens, heating/cooling, outdoor and portable grills, and central heating. Heaters in homes and other buildings may include boilers, furnaces, and water heaters. Both North America and Europe are major consumers of natural gas.

Domestic appliances, furnaces, and boilers use low pressure, usually with a standard pressure around 1.7 kilopascals (0.25 psi) over atmospheric pressure. The pressures in the supply lines vary, either the standard utilization pressure (UP) mentioned above or elevated pressure (EP), which may be anywhere from 7 to 800 kilopascals (1 to 120 psi) over atmospheric pressure. Systems using EP have a regulator at the service entrance to step down to UP.

Natural gas piping systems inside buildings are often designed with pressures of 14 to 34 kilopascals (2 to 5 psi), and have downstream pressure regulators to reduce pressure as needed. In the United States the maximum allowable operating pressure for natural gas piping systems within a building is based on NFPA 54: National Fuel Gas Code, except when approved by the Public Safety Authority or when insurance companies have more stringent requirements.

Generally, natural gas system pressures are not allowed to exceed 5 psi (34 kPa) unless all of the following conditions are met:

- The AHJ will allow a higher pressure.
- The distribution pipe is welded. (Note: 2. Some jurisdictions may also require that welded joints be radiographed to verify continuity).
- The pipes are closed for protection and placed in a ventilated area that does not allow gas accumulation.
- The pipe is installed in the areas used for industrial processes, research, storage or mechanical equipment rooms.

Generally, a maximum liquefied petroleum gas pressure of 20 psi (140 kPa) is allowed, provided the building is constructed in accordance with NFPA 58: Liquefied Petroleum Gas Code, Chapter 7.

A seismic earthquake valve operating at a pressure of 55 psig (3.7 bar) can stop the flow of natural gas into the site wide natural gas distribution piping network (that runs outdoors underground, above building roofs, and/or within the upper supports of a canopy roof). Seismic earthquake valves are designed for use at a maximum of 60 psig.

In Australia, natural gas is transported from gas processing facilities to regulator stations via transmission pipelines. Gas is then regulated down to distributed pressures and the gas is distributed around a gas network via gas mains. Small branches from the network, called services, connect individual domestic dwellings, or multi-dwelling buildings to the network. The networks typically range in pressures from 7 kPa (low pressure) to 515 kPa (high pressure). Gas is then regulated down to 1.1 kPa or 2.75 kPa, before being metered and passed to the consumer for domestic use. Natural gas mains are made from a variety of materials: historically cast iron, though more modern mains are made from steel or polyethylene.

In some states in the USA, natural gas can be supplied by independent natural gas wholesalers/suppliers using existing pipeline owners' infrastructure through Natural Gas Choice programs.

LPG (liquefied petroleum gas) typically fuels outdoor and portable grills. Although, compressed natural gas (CNG) is sparsely available for similar applications in the US in rural areas underserved by the existing pipeline system and distribution network of the less expensive and more abundant LPG (liquefied petroleum gas).

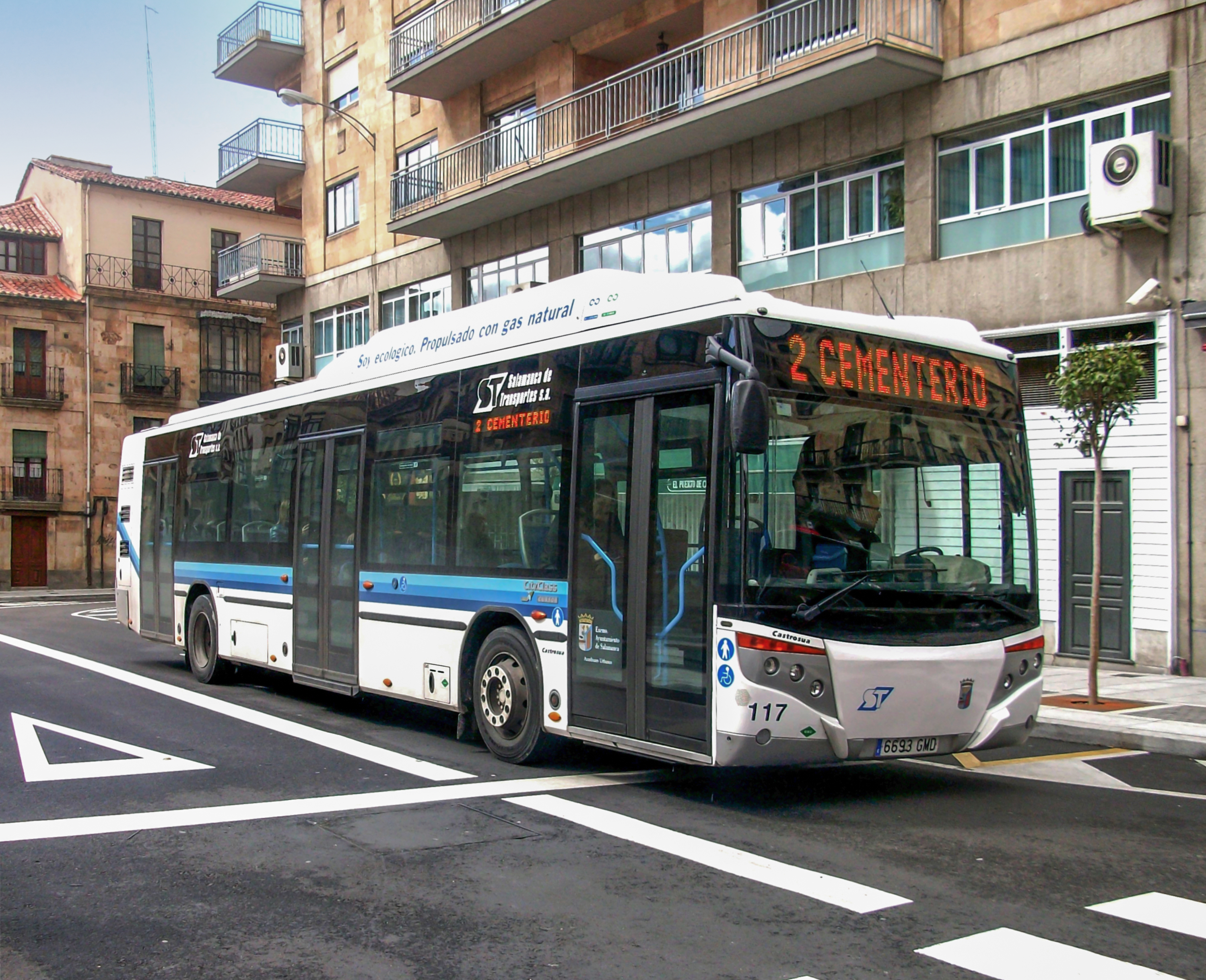
Natural gas bus in Salamanca, Spain

=== Transportation ===
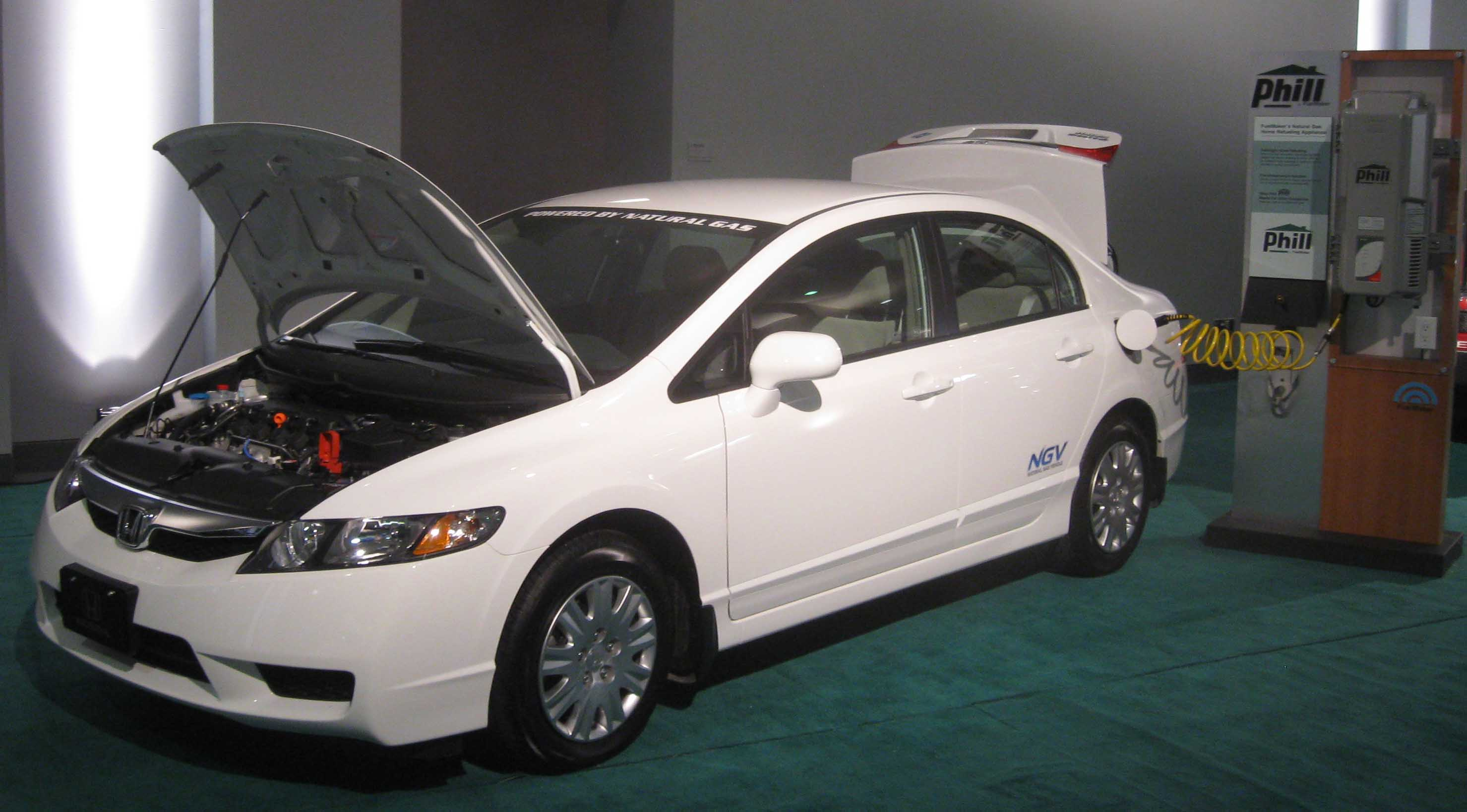
Honda Civic GX, a natural gas-powered automobile sold in North America from 1998 to 2015

CNG is a cleaner and also cheaper alternative to other automobile fuels such as gasoline (petrol). By the end of 2014, there were over 20 million natural gas vehicles worldwide, led by Iran (3.5 million), China (3.3 million), Pakistan (2.8 million), Argentina (2.5 million), India (1.8 million), and Brazil (1.8 million). The energy efficiency is generally equal to that of gasoline engines, but lower compared with modern diesel engines. Gasoline/petrol vehicles converted to run on natural gas suffer because of the low compression ratio of their engines, resulting in a cropping of delivered power while running on natural gas (10–15%). CNG-specific engines, however, use a higher compression ratio due to this fuel's higher octane number of 120–130.

Besides use in road vehicles, CNG can also be used in aircraft. Compressed natural gas has been used in some aircraft like the Aviat Aircraft Husky 200 CNG and the Chromarat VX-1 KittyHawk

LNG is also being used in aircraft. Russian aircraft manufacturer Tupolev for instance is running a development program to produce LNG- and hydrogen-powered aircraft. The program has been running since the mid-1970s, and seeks to develop LNG and hydrogen variants of the Tu-204 and Tu-334 passenger aircraft, and also the Tu-330 cargo aircraft. Depending on the current market price for jet fuel and LNG, the consumption cost advantage for LNG-powered aircraft is approximately 18.96%, along with a 53.72% reduction to carbon monoxide, hydrocarbon and nitrogen oxide emissions.

The advantages of liquid methane as a jet engine fuel are that it has more specific energy than the standard kerosene mixes do and that its low temperature can help cool the air which the engine compresses for greater volumetric efficiency, in effect replacing an intercooler. Alternatively, it can be used to lower the temperature of the exhaust.

=== Fertilizers ===
Natural gas is a major feedstock for the production of ammonia, via the Haber process, for use in fertilizer production. The development of synthetic nitrogen fertilizer has significantly supported global population growth — it has been estimated that almost half the people on the Earth are currently fed as a result of synthetic nitrogen fertilizer use.

=== Hydrogen ===
Natural gas can be used to produce hydrogen, with one common method being the hydrogen reformer. Hydrogen has many applications: it is a primary feedstock for the chemical industry, a hydrogenating agent, an important commodity for oil refineries, and the fuel source in hydrogen vehicles.

=== Animal and fish feed ===
Protein rich animal and fish feed is produced by feeding natural gas to Methylococcus capsulatus bacteria on commercial scale.

=== Olefins(alkenes) ===
Natural gas components(alkanes) can be converted into olefins(alkenes) or other chemical synthesis. Ethane by oxidative dehydrogenation converts to ethylene, which can be further converted to ethylene oxide, ethylene glycol, acetaldehyde or other olefins. Propane by oxidative hydrogenation converts to propylene or can be oxidized to acrylic acid and acrylonitrile.

=== Other ===
Natural gas is also used in the manufacture of fabrics, glass, steel, plastics, paint, synthetic oil, and other products.

Fuel for industrial heating and desiccation processes.

Raw material for large-scale fuel production using gas-to-liquid (GTL) process (e.g. to produce sulphur-and aromatic-free diesel with low-emission combustion).

== Health effects ==
Cooking with natural gas contributes to poor indoor air quality and can lead to severe respiratory diseases such as asthma.

== Environmental effects ==
Deaths caused by use of fossil fuels such as natural gas (areas of rectangles in chart) greatly exceed those resulting from production of wind energy, nuclear energy or solar energy (rectangles barely visible in chart).

=== Greenhouse effect and natural gas release ===
The warming influence (called radiative forcing) of long-lived greenhouse gases has increased substantially in the last 40 years, with carbon dioxide and methane being the dominant drivers of global warming.

Natural gas is a growing contributor to climate change. Both the gas itself (specifically methane) and carbon dioxide, which is released when natural gas is burned, are greenhouse gases. Human activity is responsible for about 60% of all methane emissions and for most of the resulting increase in atmospheric methane. Natural gas is intentionally released or is otherwise known to leak during the extraction, storage, transportation, and distribution of fossil fuels. Globally, methane accounts for an estimated 33% of anthropogenic greenhouse gas warming. The decomposition of municipal solid waste (a source of landfill gas) and wastewater account for an additional 18% of such emissions. These estimates include substantial uncertainties which should be reduced in the near future with improved satellite measurements, such as those planned for MethaneSAT.

After release to the atmosphere, methane is removed by gradual oxidation to carbon dioxide and water by hydroxyl radicals (OH^{−}) formed in the troposphere or stratosphere, giving the overall chemical reaction CH_{4} + 2O_{2} → CO_{2} + 2H_{2}O. While the lifetime of atmospheric methane is relatively short when compared to carbon dioxide, with a half-life of about seven years, it is more efficient at trapping heat in the atmosphere, so that a given quantity of methane has 84 times the global-warming potential of carbon dioxide over a 20-year period and 28 times over a 100-year period. Natural gas is thus a potent greenhouse gas due to the strong radiative forcing of methane in the short term, and the continuing effects of carbon dioxide in the longer term.

Targeted efforts to reduce warming quickly by reducing anthropogenic methane emissions is a climate change mitigation strategy supported by the Global Methane Initiative.

=== Greenhouse gas emissions ===
Growth and acceleration of emissions, and resulting atmospheric concentration

Methane emissions from fossil fuels, industrial and agricultural practices have increased since the industrial revolution.

Trendline of year-over-year increases demonstrates the persistent growth of methane emissions since the 1950s.

About 60% of current methane emissions are human-caused, contributing to the growth of methane gas in the atmosphere.

When refined and burned, natural gas can produce 25–30% less carbon dioxide per joule delivered than oil, and 40–45% less than coal. It can also produce potentially fewer toxic pollutants than other hydrocarbon fuels. However, compared to other major fossil fuels, natural gas causes more emissions in relative terms during the production and transportation of the fuel, meaning that the life cycle greenhouse gas emissions are about 50% higher than the direct emissions from the site of consumption. Some policy contexts include gas as a "bridge fuel" based on the mistaken assumption that lower emissions at burning means lower overall environmental impact.

In terms of the warming effect over 100 years, natural gas production and use comprises about one fifth of human greenhouse gas emissions, and this contribution is growing rapidly. Globally, natural gas use emitted about 7.8 billion tons of CO_{2} in 2020 (including flaring), while coal and oil use emitted 14.4 and 12 billion tons, respectively. The IEA estimates the energy sector (oil, natural gas, coal and bioenergy) to be responsible for about 40% of human methane emissions. According to the IPCC Sixth Assessment Report, natural gas consumption grew 15% between 2015 and 2019, compared to a 5% increase in oil and oil product consumption.

The continued financing and construction of new gas pipelines indicates that huge emissions of fossil greenhouse gases could be locked-in for 40 to 50 years into the future. In the U.S. state of Texas alone, five new long-distance gas pipelines have been under construction, with the first entering service in 2019, and the others scheduled to come online during 2020–2022.

==== Installation bans ====
To reduce its greenhouse emissions, the Netherlands is subsidizing a transition away from natural gas for all homes in the country by 2050. In Amsterdam, no new residential gas accounts have been allowed since 2018, and all homes in the city are expected to be converted by 2040 to use the excess heat from adjacent industrial buildings and operations. Some cities in the United States have started prohibiting gas hookups for new houses, with state laws passed and under consideration to either require electrification or prohibit local requirements. New gas appliance hookups are banned in New York State and the Australian Capital Territory. Additionally, the state of Victoria in Australia has implemented a ban on new natural gas hookups starting from January 1, 2024, as part of its gas substitution roadmap. This followed campaigning which resulted in a prohibition on onshore gas exploration and production in Victoria in 2014. This was partially lifted in 2021 but a constitutional ban remains on fracking.

The UK government is also experimenting with alternative home heating technologies to meet its climate goals. To preserve their businesses, natural gas utilities in the United States have been lobbying for laws preventing local electrification ordinances, and are promoting renewable natural gas and hydrogen fuel.

=== Other pollutants ===
Although natural gas produces far lower amounts of sulfur dioxide and nitrogen oxides (NOx) than other fossil fuels, NO_{x} from burning natural gas in homes can be a health hazard.

=== Radionuclides ===
Natural gas extraction also produces radioactive isotopes of polonium (Po-210), lead (Pb-210) and radon (Rn-220). Radon is a gas with initial activity from 5 to 200,000 becquerels per cubic meter of gas. It decays rapidly to Pb-210 which can build up as a thin film in gas extraction equipment.

== Safety concerns ==
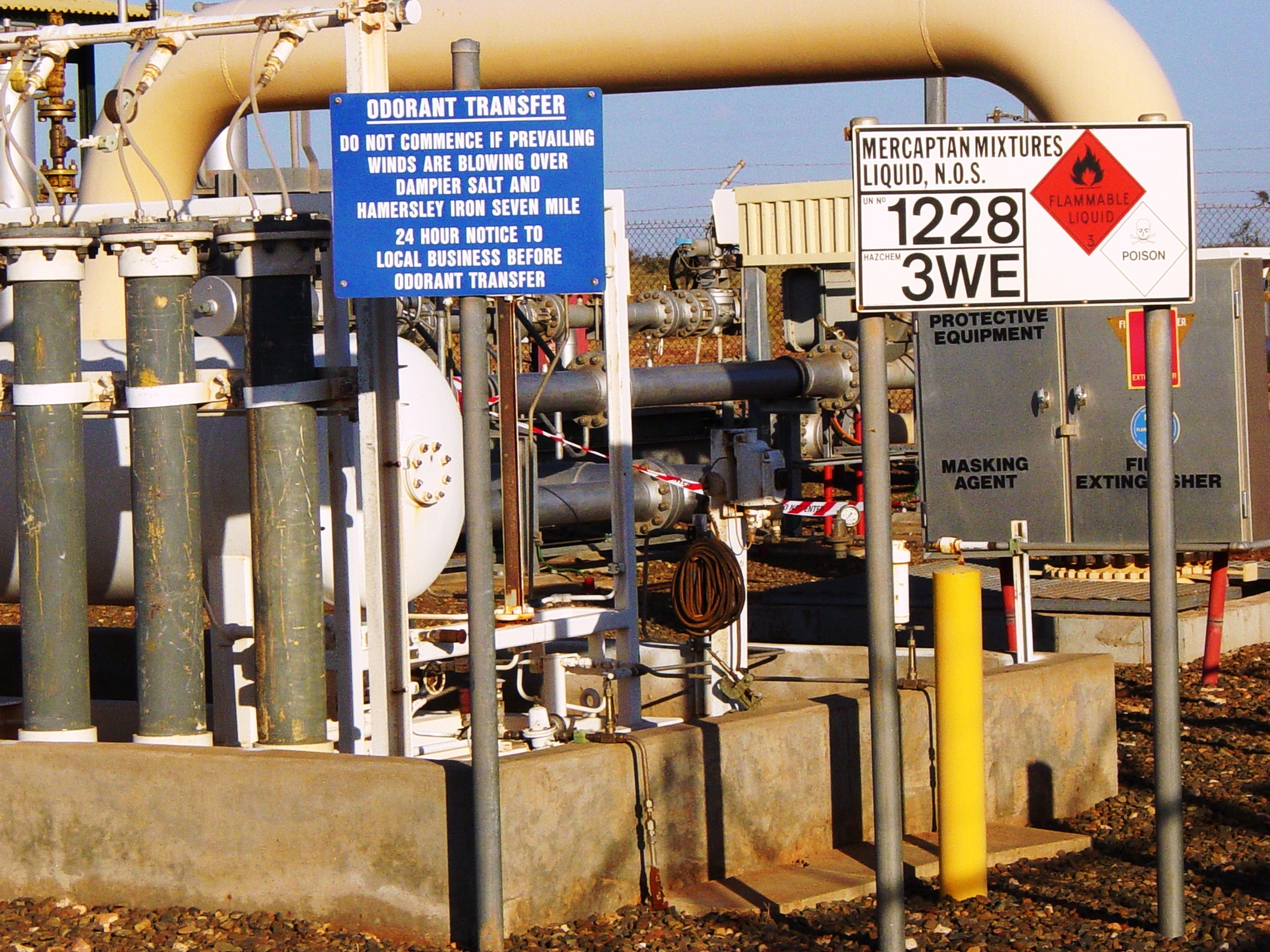
A pipeline odorant injection station

Natural gas extraction presents specific occupational health and safety challenges for the workforce involved.

=== Production ===
Some gas fields yield sour gas containing hydrogen sulfide (H_{2}S), a toxic compound when inhaled. Amine gas treating, an industrial scale process which removes acidic gaseous components, is often used to remove hydrogen sulfide from natural gas.

Extraction of natural gas (or oil) leads to decrease in pressure in the reservoir. Such decrease in pressure in turn may result in subsidence — sinking of the ground above. Subsidence may affect ecosystems, waterways, sewer and water supply systems, foundations, and so on.

=== Fracking ===
Releasing natural gas from subsurface porous rock formations may be accomplished by a process called hydraulic fracturing or "fracking". Since the first commercial hydraulic fracturing operation in 1949, approximately one million wells have been hydraulically fractured in the United States. The production of natural gas from hydraulically fractured wells has used the technological developments of directional and horizontal drilling, which improved access to natural gas in tight rock formations. Strong growth in the production of unconventional gas from hydraulically fractured wells occurred between 2000 and 2012.

In hydraulic fracturing, well operators force water mixed with a variety of chemicals through the wellbore casing into the rock. The high pressure water breaks up or "fracks" the rock, which releases gas from the rock formation. Sand and other particles are added to the water as a proppant to keep the fractures in the rock open, thus enabling the gas to flow into the casing and then to the surface. Chemicals are added to the fluid to perform such functions as reducing friction and inhibiting corrosion. After the "frack", oil or gas is extracted and 30–70% of the frack fluid, i.e. the mixture of water, chemicals, sand, etc., flows back to the surface. Many gas-bearing formations also contain water, which will flow up the wellbore to the surface along with the gas, in both hydraulically fractured and non-hydraulically fractured wells. This produced water often has a high content of salt and other dissolved minerals that occur in the formation.

The volume of water used to hydraulically fracture wells varies according to the hydraulic fracturing technique. In the United States, the average volume of water used per hydraulic fracture has been reported as nearly 7,375 gallons for vertical oil and gas wells prior to 1953, nearly 197,000 gallons for vertical oil and gas wells between 2000 and 2010, and nearly 3 million gallons for horizontal gas wells between 2000 and 2010.

Determining which fracking technique is appropriate for well productivity depends largely on the properties of the reservoir rock from which to extract oil or gas. If the rock is characterized by low-permeability – which refers to its ability to let substances, i.e. gas, pass through it, then the rock may be considered a source of tight gas. Fracking for shale gas, which is currently also known as a source of unconventional gas, involves drilling a borehole vertically until it reaches a lateral shale rock formation, at which point the drill turns to follow the rock for hundreds or thousands of feet horizontally. In contrast, conventional oil and gas sources are characterized by higher rock permeability, which naturally enables the flow of oil or gas into the wellbore with less intensive hydraulic fracturing techniques than the production of tight gas has required. The decades in development of drilling technology for conventional and unconventional oil and gas production have not only improved access to natural gas in low-permeability reservoir rocks, but also posed significant adverse impacts on environmental and public health.

The US EPA has acknowledged that toxic, carcinogenic chemicals, i.e. benzene and ethylbenzene, have been used as gelling agents in water and chemical mixtures for high volume horizontal fracturing (HVHF). Following the hydraulic fracture in HVHF, the water, chemicals, and frack fluid that return to the well's surface, called flowback or produced water, may contain radioactive materials, heavy metals, natural salts, and hydrocarbons which exist naturally in shale rock formations. Fracking chemicals, radioactive materials, heavy metals, and salts that are removed from the HVHF well by well operators are so difficult to remove from the water they are mixed with, and would so heavily pollute the water cycle, that most of the flowback is either recycled into other fracking operations or injected into deep underground wells, eliminating the water that HVHF required from the hydrologic cycle.

Historically low gas prices have delayed the nuclear renaissance, as well as the development of solar thermal energy.

=== Added odor ===
In its native state, natural gas is colorless and almost odorless. In the US, the New London School explosion that occurred in 1937 in Texas caused a push for legislation requiring the addition of an odorant to assist consumers in detecting leaks. An odorizer with an unpleasant smell, such as thiophane or tert-butylthiol (t-butyl mercaptan) may be added. Situations have occurred in which an odorant cannot be properly detected by an observer with a normal sense of smell despite being detectable by analytical instruments. This is caused by odor masking, when one odor overpowers the sensation of another. As of 2011, the industry is conducting research on the causes of odor masking.

=== Risk of explosion ===
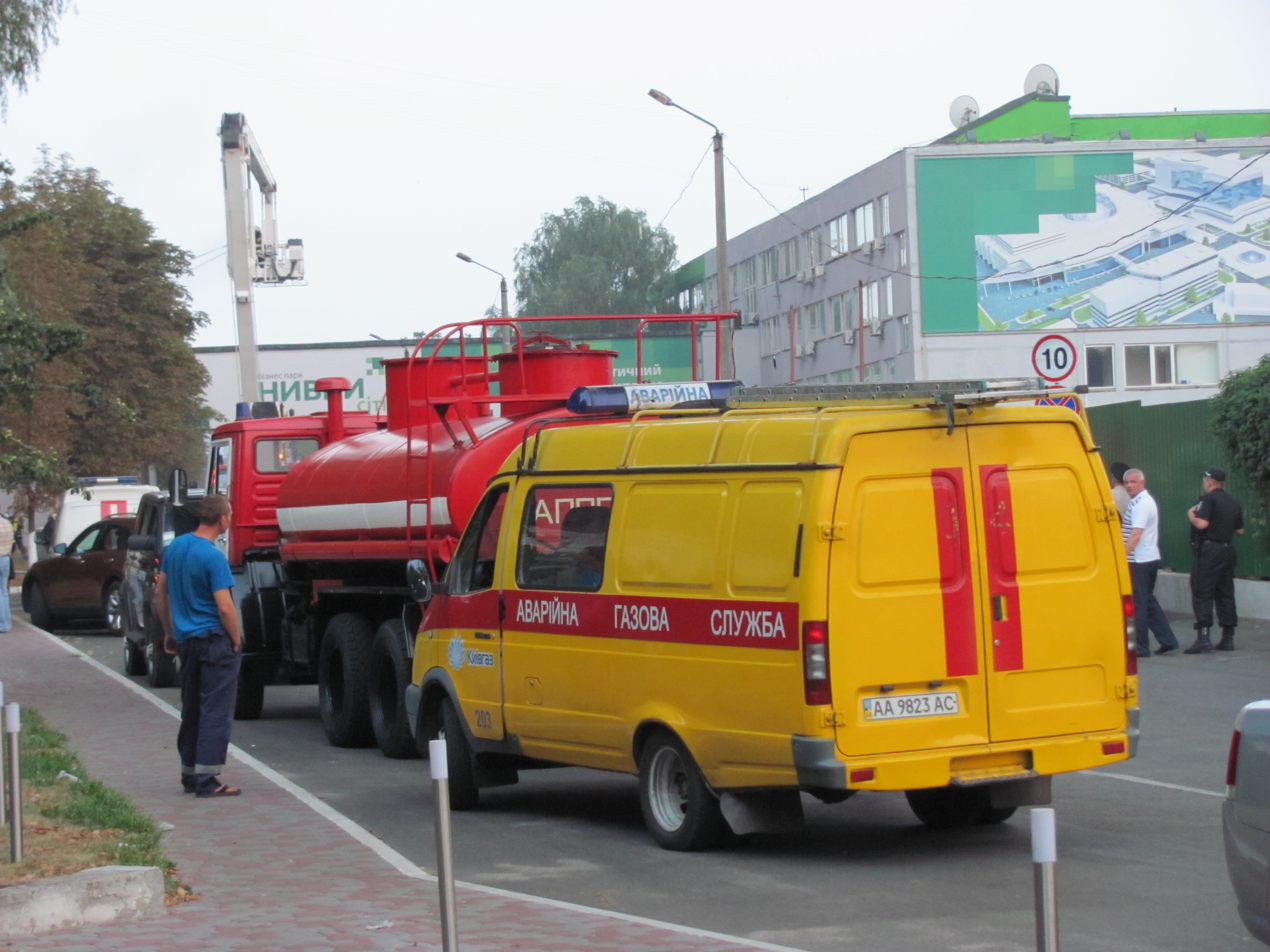
Gas network emergency vehicle responding to a major fire in Kyiv, Ukraine

Explosions caused by natural gas leaks occur a few times each year. Individual homes, small businesses and other structures are most frequently affected when an internal leak builds up gas inside the structure. Leaks often result from excavation work, such as when contractors dig and strike pipelines, sometimes without knowing any damage resulted. Frequently, the blast is powerful enough to significantly damage a building but leave it standing. In these cases, the people inside tend to have minor to moderate injuries. Occasionally, the gas can collect in high enough quantities to cause a deadly explosion, destroying one or more buildings in the process. Many building codes now forbid the installation of gas pipes inside cavity walls or below floor boards to mitigate against this risk. Gas usually dissipates readily outdoors, but can sometimes collect in dangerous quantities if flow rates are high enough. However, considering the tens of millions of structures that use the fuel, the individual risk from using natural gas is low.

=== Risk of carbon monoxide inhalation ===
Natural gas heating systems may cause carbon monoxide poisoning if unvented or poorly vented. Improvements in natural gas furnace designs have greatly reduced CO poisoning concerns. Detectors are also available that warn of carbon monoxide or explosive gases such as methane and propane.

== Energy content, statistics, and pricing ==
The U.S. and Russia have been the predominant producers of natural gas.

Quantities of natural gas are measured in standard cubic meters (cubic meter of gas at temperature 15 °C (59 °F) and pressure 101.325 kPa (14.6959 psi)) or standard cubic feet (cubic foot of gas at temperature 60.0 °F and pressure 14.73 psi (101.6 kPa)), 1 standard cubic meter = 35.301 standard cubic feet. The gross heat of combustion of commercial quality natural gas is around 39 MJ/m^{3} (0.31 kWh/ft^{3}), but this can vary by several percent. This is about 50 to 54 MJ/kg depending on the density. For comparison, the heat of combustion of pure methane is 37.7 MJ per standard cubic metre, or 55.5 MJ/kg.

Except in the European Union, the U.S., and Canada, natural gas is sold in gigajoule retail units. LNG (liquefied natural gas) and LPG (liquefied petroleum gas) are traded in metric tonnes (1,000 kg) or million BTU as spot deliveries. Long term natural gas distribution contracts are signed in cubic meters, and LNG contracts are in metric tonnes. The LNG and LPG is transported by specialized transport ships, as the gas is liquified at cryogenic temperatures. The specification of each LNG/LPG cargo will usually contain the energy content, but this information is in general not available to the public. The European Union aimed to cut its gas dependency on Russia by two-thirds in 2022.

In August 2015, possibly the largest natural gas discovery in history was made and notified by an Italian gas company ENI. The energy company indicated that it has unearthed a "supergiant" gas field in the Mediterranean Sea covering about 40 square miles (100 km^{2}). This was named the Zohr gas field and could hold a potential 30 trillion cubic feet (8.5×10^{11} cubic meters) of natural gas. ENI said that the energy is about 5.5 billion barrels of oil equivalent [BOE] (3.4×10^{10} GJ). The Zohr field was found in the deep waters off the northern coast of Egypt and ENI claims that it will be the largest ever in the Mediterranean and even the world.

With 15 countries accounting for 84% of the worldwide extraction, access to natural gas has become an important issue in international politics, and countries vie for control of pipelines. In the first decade of the 21st century, Gazprom, the state-owned energy company in Russia, engaged in disputes with Ukraine and Belarus over the price of natural gas, which have created concerns that gas deliveries to parts of Europe could be cut off for political reasons. The United States is preparing to export natural gas.

=== European Union ===
Gas prices for end users vary greatly across the EU. A single European energy market, one of the key objectives of the EU, should level the prices of gas in all EU member states. Moreover, it would help to resolve supply and global warming issues, as well as strengthen relations with other Mediterranean countries and foster investments in the region. During the prelude to the 2022 Russian invasion of Ukraine, Qatar was asked by the US to supply emergency gas to the EU in case of supply disruptions. As of 2026, the European Union has introduced legislation to phase out natural gas imports from Russia.

=== United States ===
In US units, one standard cubic foot (28 L) of natural gas produces around 1,028 British thermal units (1,085 kJ). The actual heating value when the water formed does not condense is the net heat of combustion and can be as much as 10% less.

In the United States, retail sales are often in units of therms (th); 1 therm = 100,000 BTU. Gas sales to domestic consumers are often in units of 100 standard cubic feet (scf). Gas meters measure the volume of gas used, and this is converted to therms by multiplying the volume by the energy content of the gas used during that period, which varies slightly over time. The typical annual consumption of a single family residence is 1,000 therms or one Residential Customer Equivalent (RCE). Wholesale transactions are generally done in decatherms (Dth), thousand decatherms (MDth), or million decatherms (MMDth). A million decatherms is a trillion BTU, roughly a billion cubic feet of natural gas.

The price of natural gas varies greatly depending on location and type of consumer. The typical caloric value of natural gas is roughly 1,000 BTU per cubic foot, depending on gas composition. Natural gas in the United States is traded as a futures contract on the New York Mercantile Exchange. Each contract is for 10,000 million BTU or 10 billion BTU (10,551 GJ). Thus, if the price of gas is $10/million BTU on the NYMEX, the contract is worth $100,000.

=== Canada ===
Canada uses metric measure for internal trade of petrochemical products. Consequently, natural gas is sold by the gigajoule (GJ), cubic meter (m^{3}) or thousand cubic meters (E3m3). Distribution infrastructure and meters almost always meter volume (cubic foot or cubic meter). Some jurisdictions, such as Saskatchewan, sell gas by volume only. Other jurisdictions, such as Alberta, sell gas by energy content (GJ). In these areas, almost all meters for residential and small commercial customers measure volume (m^{3} or ft^{3}), and billing statements include a multiplier to convert the volume to the energy content of the local gas supply.

A gigajoule (GJ) is a measure approximately equal to 80 litres (0.5 barrels) of oil, or 28 m^{3} or 1,000 ft^{3} or 1 million BTUs of gas. The energy content of gas supply in Canada can vary from 37 to 43 MJ/m^{3} (990 to 1,150 BTU/cu ft) depending on gas supply and processing between the wellhead and the customer.

== Adsorbed natural gas (ANG) ==
Natural gas may be stored by adsorbing it to the porous solids called sorbents. The optimal condition for methane storage is at room temperature and atmospheric pressure. Pressures up to 4 MPa (about 40 times atmospheric pressure) will yield greater storage capacity. The most common sorbent used for ANG is activated carbon (AC), primarily in three forms: Activated Carbon Fiber (ACF), Powdered Activated Carbon (PAC), and activated carbon monolith.

== See also ==
- Associated petroleum gas
- Energy transition
- Gas/oil ratio
- Liquefied natural gas
- Natural gas by country
- Peak gas
- Power-to-gas
- Renewable natural gas
- Strategic natural gas reserve
- World energy supply and consumption
