= Allen Hazen Water Tower =

- U.S. National Register of Historic Places
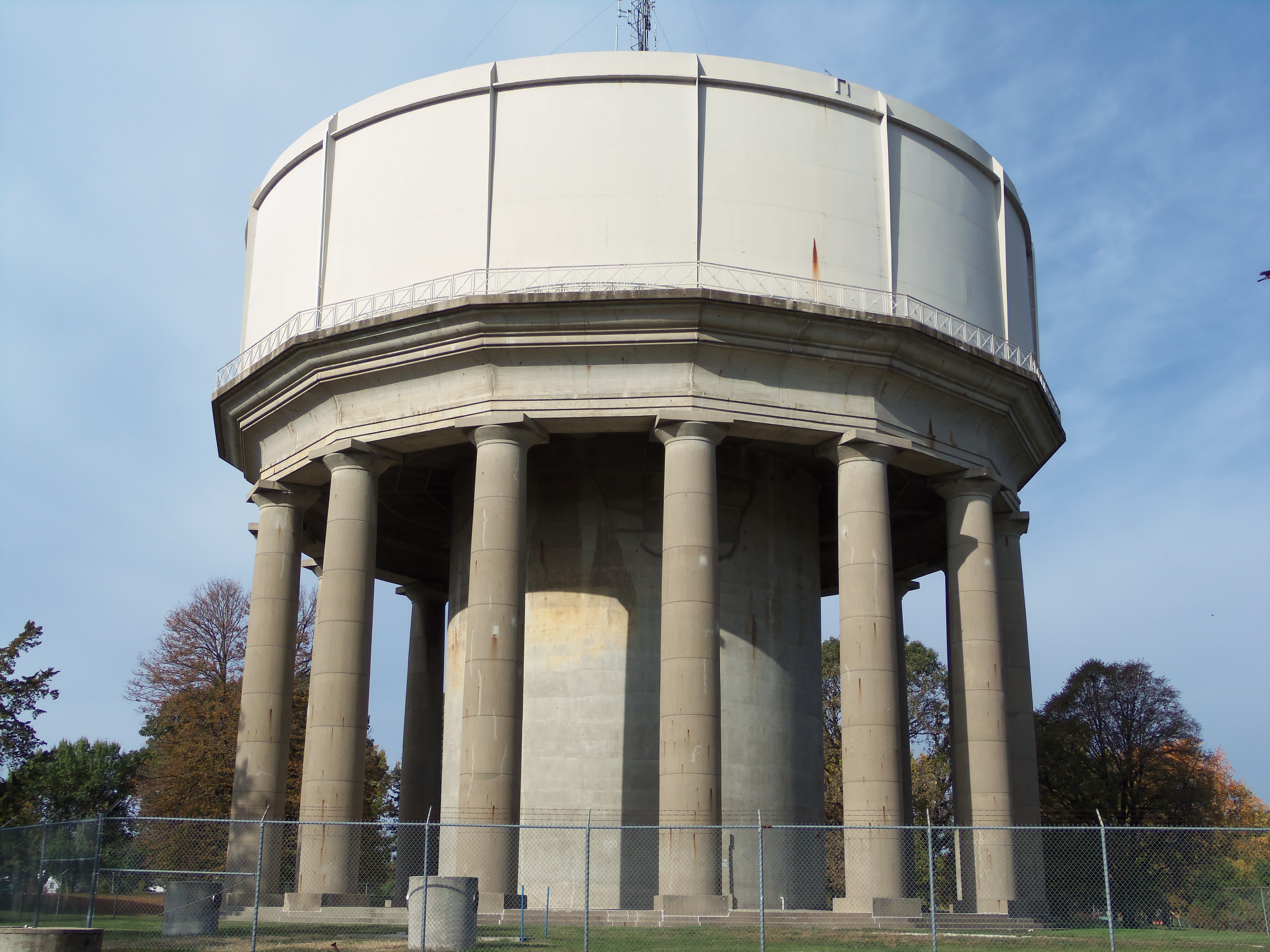

- Location within Iowa Location within the United States
- Location: 4800 Hickman Rd. Des Moines, Iowa
- Coordinates: 41°36′51.4″N 93°41′2.1″W
- Area: 5 acres (2.0 ha)
- Built: 1930-1931
- Architect: Everett & Hazen; Clinton Mackenzie
- Architectural style: Classical Revival
- NRHP reference No.: 04000819
- Added to NRHP: August 11, 2004

The Allen Hazen Water Tower, also known as the Municipal Water Tower, is a historic structure located on the west side of Des Moines, Iowa, United States. It was listed on the National Register of Historic Places in 2004.

== History ==
The first water storage facility in the city of Des Moines was located at Seventeenth and Crocker Streets, and it was completed in 1891. Before it was torn down in 1939, the Allen Hazen Water Tower was completed in 1931. It was designed by New York engineer Clinton Mackenzie of Everett & Hazen. Allen Hazen, one of the partners in the firm and a pioneer in water treatment, was a consulting engineer to the Des Moines Water Works in the 1920s. He also supervised the tower's construction. Hazen died just before construction was completed and the tower was named in his honor. While there are other water storage facilities in Des Moines, this is technically the only water tower in the city. At one time a large arrow was painted on top of the structure to guide pilots to the Des Moines airport.

== Architecture ==
The tower was constructed in concrete and steel. The structure is 110 feet (34 m) tall and holds 1.7 million gallons of water. Everett & Hazen chose the Neoclassical style to reference the waterworks of Ancient Rome. The base is composed of 15 concrete Tuscan columns that support the entablature. The tower's original design had called for 16 columns on the base and a colonnade capped with a concrete parapet that would surround the tank. Other decorative elements that were removed before the tower was built include brackets at the cornice and astragal molding. As completed, the tank is exposed instead of hidden and its lapped joints continue the vertical lines of the columns on the base. An antenna caps the structure, which unites technology and traditionalism.
