= Infiltration gallery =

An infiltration gallery is a structure including perforated conduits in gravel to expedite transfer of water to or from a soil.

== Water supply ==
Infiltration galleries may be used to collect water from the aquifer underlying a river. Water from an infiltration gallery has the advantage of bank filtration to reduce the water treatment requirements for a surface withdrawal. An infiltration gallery may also be the best way to withdraw water from a thin aquifer or lens of fresh water overlying saline water.

== Storm water disposal ==
Infiltration galleries may be used to supplement a storm sewer, by directing storm runoff from non-road areas.

While the catchbasins under sewer grates work well on swift-flowing surfaces like asphalt and concrete, heavy storm water flow on grass lawns or other open areas will pool in low areas if there is no outlet. An infiltration gallery serves this purpose in two ways.

Primarily, upright plastic pipes capped with simple grates are placed every 5–8 metres along the low point of a slope, to handle heavy surface runoff. The pipes proceed straight down, about two metres, to a horizontal cross-pipe; this pipe is the secondary system.

About ten per cent of the surface area of a horizontal pipe is then perforated slightly and surrounded by gravel. Initially, runoff will exit the pipe and infiltrate the gravel to the soil beyond, dissipating naturally. As flow increases, the water will eventually fill the pipe and need to be dissipated more quickly. Thus, a catchbasin is placed at the lowest point of the sloping ground, which is connected to the storm sewer system at large.

Such galleries are a relatively new development in urban planning, and are thus found in newer housing developments.
