= Residential Customer Equivalent =

Residential Customer Equivalent (RCE) is a unit of measures used by the energy industry to denote the typical annual commodity consumption by a single-family residential customer. Also known as "RCE" for short, a single RCE represents 1,000 therms of natural gas or 10,000 kWh of electricity.

RCE is often used to help normalize the size of energy companies. Energy companies serve a number of customers that is typically different from the RCE value consumed by those customers. For example, an LDC or ESCO may serve 50,000 customers but many of those can be commercial or industrial customers, so that same company can be said to serve 400,000 RCE.
