= List of parks in Polk County, Iowa =

Polk County is the most populous county in Iowa with around 500,000 residents living within the county boundaries, with the majority living in the Des Moines metro area. Its major cities being Des Moines, Ankeny, and West Des Moines. The cities of Urbandale, Clive, and West Des Moines all are mostly in Polk County, but have parks located in other counties which are not counted towards parks in Polk County. There is around 16,000 acres (6,500 ha) of parks operated by the Polk County Conservation. The biggest park being Chichaqua Bottoms Greenbelt at 9,100 acres (3,700 ha).

Altoona
Name	Image	Location	Size
17th Ave Dog Park		851 17th Ave SW	
Falcon Ridge Park		15th St SE	
Haines Park		3rd Ave SE	
Ironwood Park		2222 3rd Ave SW	
Lions Park		507 13th Ave SW	
Oak Hill Park		1975 28th Ave SW	
Phoenix Park		450 19th Ave SW	
Prairie Heritage & Civic Plaza		360 Center Pl. SW	
Sam Wise Youth Sports Complex		600 8th Ave SE	
Skip Conkling Memorial Playground		700 8th St SW	
Spring Creek Park		24th Street SE	
Spring Creek Sports Complex		7600 NE 38th Ave	
Village Park		4th St. NW	

Ankeny
Name	Image	Location	Size
Ankeny Dog Park		1155 SW Ankeny Road	7.5 acres (3.0 ha)
Ashland Meadows Park		NW Park Meadows Drive	
Bellagio Park		5000 NE Bellagio Dr.	
Boulder Brook Park		3333 NW Boulder Point Place	
Briarwood Park		2701 NE Oak Drive	
Carney Marsh Nature Preserve		580 SE 54th Street	
Centennial Park		2202 NW Reinhart Drive	
Cherry Glen Ballfield		5325 NW 8th Street	
Creekside Park		575 NE 47th Street	
Crestbruck Park		1007 NE Crestmoor Place	
Dean Park		1720 SW Abilene Road	
Deer Creek Park		1601 NE Chambers Parkway	
Diamond Hills Greenbelt		SW Polk City Drive and SW Applewood St	
District Playground		1250 SW District Dr.	
Estates Park		2020 SW Cascade Falls Drive	
Georgetown Park		2625 NW Ash Drive	
Glenbrooke Park		2803 SW Glenbrooke Drive	
Greentree Park		1914 NW Hickory Lane	
Haubert Park		914 SW 3rd Street	
Hawkeye Park		400 NW Lakeshore Drive	
Heritage Park		300 NE Frisk Drive	
Hillside Park		1925 SE Four Mile Drive	
Horizon Park		1509 NW Prairie Ridge Drive	
Michael Park		700 NE Michael Drive	
Midway Park		1500 SW Des Moines Street	
Miracle Park		300 NW School Street	0.32 acres (0.13 ha)
Northcreek Park		1309 NW Irvindale Drive	
Otter Creek Park		1100 NE 36th Street	
Prairie Ridge Skate Park		1400 NW Prairie Ridge Drive	0.21 acres (0.085 ha)
Prairie Ridge Sports Complex		1510 NW Ash Drive	
Precedence Park		1725 SW Precedence Road	
Renaissance Park		3425 NE Renaissance Drive	
Sawgrass Park		2200 SW 36th Street	
Somersby Park		816 SW Springfield Drive	
Springwood Park		275 SE Springwood Drive	
Summerbrook Park		800 SE Delaware Avenue	
Sunrise Park		506 SE Peterson Drive	
Sunset Park		1309 SW 3rd Street	
Village Park		1241 NW 4th Street	
Vintage Park		SW Vintage Parkway and SW State Street	
Wagner Park		410 W First Street	
Watercrest Park		4320 NW 5th Street	
Westside Park		599 SW State Street	
Westview Park		1155 SW Magazine Road	
Westwinds Park		2200 SW Woodbury Lane	
White Birch Park		SW 35th Street and SW White Birch Drive	
Woodland Reserve Greenway		610 NE 36th Street	

Bondurant
Name	Image	Location	Size
Bondurant Recreational Sports Complex		2050 Jr. Haines Pkwy	45.82 acres (18.54 ha)
City Park		201 Main St	1.7 acres (0.69 ha)
Collison Soccer Park		315 2nd St	9.5 acres (3.8 ha)
Eagle Park		320 2nd St	39.1 acres (15.8 ha)
Eva Pointe Park		401 Eva Point Dr	0.5 acres (0.20 ha)
Gateway Park		1499 Grant St	1.3 acres (0.53 ha)
Lake Petocka Park		521 Pleasant St	34.9 acres (14.1 ha)
Lincoln Estates Park		1201 Kadin Trail	0.4 acres (0.16 ha)
Mallard Pointe Park		501 Mallard Pointe Dr	0.46 acres (0.19 ha)
Renaud Ridge Park		410 Sycamore Dr	0.48 acres (0.19 ha)
Wisteria Heights Park		1310 13th St	1.3 acres (0.53 ha)
Wolf Creek Park		3207 Wolf Creek Rd	1.47 acres (0.59 ha)

Clive
Name	Image	Location	Size
Campbell Recreation Area		12385 Woodlands Parkway	34 acres (14 ha)
George Lundberg Park		1450 NW 78th Street	2 acres (0.81 ha)
Huntington Ridge Park		1400 NW 131st Street	0.75 acres (0.30 ha)
Karp Park		1500 NW 109th Street	2 acres (0.81 ha)
Linnan Park		8500 Alice Road	3 acres (1.2 ha)
Rio Valley Park		1743 Rio Valley Drive	1 acre (0.40 ha)
Swanson Memorial Park		8641 Swanson Boulevard	15 acres (6.1 ha)
Walnut Ridge Park		10700 Elmcrest Drive	0.5 acres (0.20 ha)
Wellington Ridge Park		1400 NW 123rd Street	
Westview Bend Park		1836 NW 90th Street	0.25 acres (0.10 ha)

Des Moines
Name	Image	Location	Size
Allen Park		4850 SE 5th St	4.16 acres (1.68 ha)
Ashby Park		3200 38th St	11.8 acres (4.8 ha)
Ashfield Park		720 E 19th St	7.2 acres (2.9 ha)
Ashworth Park		102 45th St	62.7 acres (25.4 ha)
Bates Park		330 Clark St	3.7 acres (1.5 ha)
Beaverdale Park		3333 Adams Ave	24.8 acres (10.0 ha)
Belle M Turner Park		800 Jerlynn Ave	2.4 acres (0.97 ha)
Birdland Park		2100 Saylor Rd	44.3 acres (17.9 ha)
Birdland Sports Park		645 Birdland Dr	29.4 acres (11.9 ha)
Blank Park Golf Course		711 County Line Rd.	150.4 acres (60.9 ha)
Blank Park Zoo		7401 SW 9th St	61.2 acres (24.8 ha)
Brian Melton Field		1000 Jefferson Ave	7.3 acres (3.0 ha)
Bright Grandview Golf Course		2401 E 29th St	101.6 acres (41.1 ha)
Brody School Park		2501 Park Ave	20.3 acres (8.2 ha)
Brooke Run Park		4901 E Douglas Ave	5 acres (2.0 ha)
Burke Park		601 E University Ave	1.7 acres (0.69 ha)
Carney Park		2780 SW 30th St	49.3 acres (20.0 ha)
Chamberlain Park		2134 Woodland Ave	1.1 acres (0.45 ha)
Cheatom Park		1100 Day St	3.5 acres (1.4 ha)
Chesterfield Park		2719 Scott Ave	5.8 acres (2.3 ha)
Cohen Park		1000 Scott Ave	1 acre (0.40 ha)
Columbus Park		1921 SE 1st St	5.4 acres (2.2 ha)
Cowles Commons		313 Walnut St	1.8 acres (0.73 ha)
Crowley Park		1760 Garfield Ave	1.1 acres (0.45 ha)
Des Moines Botanical Gardens		909 Robert D Ray Dr	14.6 acres (5.9 ha)
Drake Park		2300 Drake Park Ave	5 acres (2.0 ha)
Easter Lake Park		2830 Easter Lake Dr	468 acres (189 ha)
Easton Basin Park		2617 Easton Blvd	15 acres (6.1 ha)
Easttown Park		2559 Hubbell Ave	13.5 acres (5.5 ha)
Edna Griffin Park		1613 13th St	0.5 acres (0.20 ha)
EMC Downtown Park		701 Walnut Street	0.397 acres (0.161 ha)
Evelyn K. Davis Park		1400 Forest Ave	10.1 acres (4.1 ha)
Evergreen Park		2006 Evergreen Ave	5.5 acres (2.2 ha)
Ewing Dog Park		4660 Indianola Ave	8.5 acres (3.4 ha)
Ewing Park		5300 Indianola Ave	355 acres (144 ha)
Fairmont Park		2520 Hull Ave	4.6 acres (1.9 ha)
Fourmile Park		3711 Easton Blvd	33.3 acres (13.5 ha)
Franklin Community Garden		5300 Franklin Avenue	2 acres (0.81 ha)
Frisbie Park		6101 Muskogee Ave	3.4 acres (1.4 ha)
George Davis Softball Park		4980 E 46th St	78.6 acres (31.8 ha)
Good Park		1103 17th St	11 acres (4.5 ha)
Grandview Park		3230 Easton Blvd	59.6 acres (24.1 ha)
Gray's Lake Park		2101 Fleur Dr	166.6 acres (67.4 ha)
Greenwood Park		100 45th St	80.8 acres (32.7 ha)
Harmon Park		3900 SW 26th St	4.7 acres (1.9 ha)
James W. Cownie Baseball Park		2050 SE 22nd St	62.6 acres (25.3 ha)
James W. Cownie Soccer Park		2600 Hartford Ave	372.8 acres (150.9 ha)
Jim Muto Recreation Area		700 Robert D Ray Dr	2.6 acres (1.1 ha)
John and Mary Pappajohn Sculpture Park		1418 Grand Avenue	4.4 acres (1.8 ha)
Jordan Park		600 E Wall Ave	1.6 acres (0.65 ha)
Laurel Hill Park		3407 Dean Ave	2 acres (0.81 ha)
MacRae Park		1021 Davis Ave	50.9 acres (20.6 ha)
Martin Luther King Jr Park		1650 Garfield Ave	6 acres (2.4 ha)
McCollum-Waveland Tennis Complex		928 Polk Blvd	2.2 acres (0.89 ha)
McHenry Park		1012 Oak Park Ave	19.4 acres (7.9 ha)
Nash Park		901 University Ct	0.2 acres (0.081 ha)
Pete Crivaro Park		1105 E Railroad Ave	0.2 acres (0.081 ha)
Pioneer Park		1650 Pioneer Rd	46.4 acres (18.8 ha)
Pocket Park #1		1400 E 19th St	0.34 acres (0.14 ha)
Pocket Park #2		2830 E 35th St	0.3 acres (0.12 ha)
Principal Riverwalk		115 Grand Ave	15.3 acres (6.2 ha)
Prospect Park		1225 Prospect Rd	141.6 acres (57.3 ha)
Redhead Park		1700 Dean Ave	1.1 acres (0.45 ha)
Reno Memorial Dog Park		3325 Hubbell Ave	4.2 acres (1.7 ha)
Riley Park		5300 Urbandale Ave	3 acres (1.2 ha)
Riverview Park		710 Corning Ave	43.6 acres (17.6 ha)
Riverwalk Dog Park		1111 Illinois St	4 acres (1.6 ha)
Rotary Riverwalk Park		800 W. River Drive	50.9 acres (20.6 ha)
Sargent Park		3500 E Douglas Ave	30.3 acres (12.3 ha)
Sayers Park		1300 Linden Ln	4.1 acres (1.7 ha)
Sheridan Park		4000 Hull Ave	3.5 acres (1.4 ha)
Stewart Square Park		1401 E Grand Ave	1.9 acres (0.77 ha)
Stone Park		2100 SE 5th St	15.5 acres (6.3 ha)
Strasser Woods State Preserve		1552 E 36th St	40 acres (16 ha)
Talarico Park		409 Columbus Ave	0.93 acres (0.38 ha)
Tower Park		4900 Hickman Rd	12.9 acres (5.2 ha)
Union Park		2009 Saylor Rd	51 acres (21 ha)
Valley High Manor Park		1022 Winegardner Rd	4.6 acres (1.9 ha)
Waveland Golf Course		4908 University Ave	159.3 acres (64.5 ha)
Westchester Park		4901 Valdez Dr	5.9 acres (2.4 ha)
Western Gateway Park		1000 Grand Ave	10.8 acres (4.4 ha)
Whitmer Park		526 Lyon St	0.5 acres (0.20 ha)
Witmer Park		1610 34th St	19.1 acres (7.7 ha)
Woodlawn Park		3126 Twana Dr	7.1 acres (2.9 ha)

Grimes
Name	Image	Location	Size
Autumn Park		400 NW Brookside Dr	0.5 acres (0.20 ha)
Beaverbrooke Park		797 N Jame St	6.4 acres (2.6 ha)
Glenstone Park		3100 SE Glenstone Dr	3.6 acres (1.5 ha)
Hy-Vee Multiplex Powered by the City of Grimes		1000 NE Heritage Dr	50 acres (20 ha)
Grimes Community Complex Park		410 SE Main St	3.6 acres (1.5 ha)
Heritage Park		1055 NE Beaverbrooke Blvd	2 acres (0.81 ha)
Lions Park			4.8 acres (1.9 ha)
Kennybrook South Park		800 SE Brookside Dr	4.5 acres (1.8 ha)
North Sports Complex		700 NW 27th St	26 acres (11 ha)
South Sports Complex		750 S James St	45 acres (18 ha)
Shawver Park		SE Dolan Dr	4 acres (1.6 ha)
Wallace Park		SE Main St &, SE 6th St	14 acres (5.7 ha)
Waterworks Park		100 N James St	8.5 acres (3.4 ha)

Johnston
Name	Image	Location	Size
Adventure Ridge Park		10201 Windsor Parkway	5 acres (2.0 ha)
Crosshaven Park		7909 NW 95th Street	
Dewey Park		5225 NW 64th Place	
Dog Park		5401 NW Johnston Drive	4 acres (1.6 ha)
Greenwood Hills Park		5700 NW 86th Street	
Johnston Commons		6050 Morningside Drive	14 acres (5.7 ha)
Lew Clarkson Park		7501 NW 54th Avenue	55 acres (22 ha)
Morningside Park		5605 Morningside Drive	
Pointe Vista Park		9612 Enfield Drive	
Providence Point		10325 Catalina Drive	
Ray Schleihs Park		5400 NW 55th Avenue	
Terra Park		6400 Pioneer Parkway	200 acres (81 ha)

Pleasant Hill
Name	Image	Location	Size
Christie Lane Park		564 Christie Lane	
Copper Creek Lake Park		4390 E. University Ave	40 acres (16 ha)
Doanes Park		4900 Doanes Park Rd.	43 acres (17 ha)
Hickory Glen Park		SE 6th Ave & SE 68th St	77 acres (31 ha)
Meacham Place Park		6010 E Oakwood Dr.	
Oak Hill Park		2115 Copper Wynd Dr.	
Sunrise Park		5415 E. Oakwood Dr.	7.5 acres (3.0 ha)
Sunset Park		4463 E. Oakwood Dr.	

Polk City
Name	Image	Location	Size
Doc Simmer Memorial Park		608 Tyler St.	1.46 acres (0.59 ha)
Kiwanis Park		451 N. 3rd St.	1.85 acres (0.75 ha)
Leonard Park		413 N. Parker Blvd.	1.59 acres (0.64 ha)
Lost Lake Park		504 N. Broadway St.	3.81 acres (1.54 ha)
Marina Cove Park		430 E. Southside Dr.	2.74 acres (1.11 ha)
Miller Park		401 Booth St.	2.39 acres (0.97 ha)
Morse Family Park		1409 Westside Dr.	.55 acres (0.22 ha)
Polk City Sports Complex		1701 W Bridge Rd	12.63 acres (5.11 ha)
Polk City Town Square		107 S. 3rd St.	1 acre (0.40 ha)
Twelve Oaks Park		1349 Twelve Oaks Dr.	4.52 acres (1.83 ha)

Urbandale
Name	Image	Location	Size
Ashleaf Park		3934 Mary Lynn Drive	
Bent Creek Ridge		146th and Plum	
Bestland Park		91st Street and Meredith Drive	6 acres (2.4 ha)
Brookview Park		65th Street and Sutton Drive	
Charles Gabus Memorial Tree Park and Gardens		3400 86th Street	
Colby Woods Park		3000 Colby Woods Drive	
Coronado Park		Eula Drive and Sandler Drive	
Cross Creek Park		92nd Avenue and Aurora Avenue	
Days Run Park		124th Street and Tanglewood Drive	
Donald J, Brush Park		129th Street and Cardinal Lane	
Foxdale Park		10115 Oakwood Drive	
Glen Eagles Park		96th and Meredith Dr.	
Golfview Park		Hammontree Drive and 95th Street	
Jackaline Baldwin Dunlap Park and Arboretum		Patricia Drive and Dewey Gibbs Road	
Jaycee Park		71st Street and Iltis Drive	
Jeff Harm Park		128th Street and Aurora Avenue	
Lakeview Park		80th Street and Aurora Avenue	
Laura A. Ward Park		3900 NW Urbandale Drive	
Lawson Trolley Park		70th and Roseland Ave.	
Lions Park		72nd Street and Aurora Avenue	8.5 acres (3.4 ha)
Lynner Woods		72nd Street and Hickory Lane	
Merideth Park		82nd and Meredith Dr.	
Murphy Park		67th Street and Urbandale Avenue	
North Karen Acres Park		77th Street and Douglas Avenue	
Northview Estates Park		69th and Deerview Drive	
Northview Park		4871 78th Street	
Rick Boals Park		77th Street and Roseland Avenue	
Rocklyn Park		70th Street and New York Avenue	
Sharon Heights Park		4624 78th Street	5 acres (2.0 ha)
Sunflower Park		92nd Dr. and Douglas Ave	
Sylvan Ridge Park		75th Circle	
Timberline Park		135th and Ridgeview	
Walker Johnston Park		9000 Douglas Avenue	79.7 acres (32.3 ha)
Winter Park		5110 72nd Street	

West Des Moines
Name	Image	Location	Size
American Legion Park		301 Vine St	
Ashawa Park		4431 Waterford Dr	
Beh Glen Park		1898 EP True Pkwy	
Brown's Woods		465 Brown's Woods Dr	486 acres (197 ha)
Crossroads Park		5205 Ashworth Rd	
Fairmeadows Park		543 22nd St	
Florer Park		1410 Locust St	
Holiday Park		1701 Railroad Ave	
Jaycee Park		5608 Center St	
Jordan Creek Park		310 50th St	
Kiwanis Park		3101 Maple St	
Knolls Park		5150 Aspen Dr	
Legacy Woods		2296 Grand Ave	
Meadowview Park		638 Prairie View Dr	
Pearson Park		1256 19th St	
Peony Park		1100 63rd St	
Pinedale Park		3375 Woodland Ave	
Quail Cove Park		1515 S 52nd St	
Raccoon River Park		2500 Grand Avenue	
Railroad Park		425 Railroad Ave	
Scenic Valley Park		1223 S 24th Ct	
Southwoods Park		350 S 35th St	
Walnut Woods State Park		3155 Walnut Woods Dr	250 acres (100 ha)
Western Hills Park		4115 Walnut St	
Willow Springs Park		5685 Wistful Vista Dr	
Wilson Park		298 9th St	

Windsor Heights
Name	Image	Location	Size
Colby Park		6900 School St	8.6 acres (3.5 ha)
Dog Park		Colby Park	2.2 acres (0.89 ha)
Harmony Park		Colby Park, 6900 School St	3.36 acres (1.36 ha)
Lions Park		1133 66th St	0.2 acres (0.081 ha)

Parks in small communities
Name	Image	Location	Size
Mally’s Park		NE 38th St, Berwick	265 acres (107 ha)

Parks not located in city boundaries
Name	Image	Location	Size
Beaver Creek Greenbelt		NW 121st St	73 acres (30 ha)
Chichaqua Bottoms Greenbelt		8700 NE 126th Ave	9,100 acres (3,700 ha)
Engeldinger Marsh		11961 NE 118th Ave	214 acres (87 ha)
Fort Des Moines Park		7200 SE 5th St	135 acres (55 ha)
Jester Park		12130 Northwest 128th St	1,675 acres (678 ha)
Thomas Mitchell Park		4590 NE 108th St	197 acres (80 ha)
Yellow Banks Park		6801 SE 32nd Ave	576 acres (233 ha)
