= Raccoon River Park =

Park in West Des Moines, Iowa

- Type: Urban park
- Location: West Des Moines, Iowa
- Coordinates: 41°33′16.7904″N 93°43′39.237″W
- Area: 631.61 acres
- Owned by: City of West Des Moines
- Website: http://www.wdm.iowa.gov/government/parks-recreation/parks-facilities-trails

Raccoon River Park is an urban park located in West Des Moines, Iowa. The park has 631.61 acres, with 232 acres consisting of Blue Heron Lake which is the center of the park. The park is surrounded by Raccoon River in the south and east, Walnut Woods State Park in the south, Brown's Woods in the east, and Jordan Creek in the northeast. The park is owned and operated by the city of West Des Moines.

The area along the Raccoon River is mostly densely wooded bottomland. The west edge of the park has a marshy area, and there is grassland habitat on the east side of the lake and along the north shore. There are over 180 confirmed bird species in the park. Blue Heron Lake is home to several different types of fish, such as crappie, blue gill, bullheads, catfish, carp, bass, and walleye.

== History ==
The earliest recorded settlement in the boundaries of the park was a farmstead in 1907. By the mid-1940s this farmstead was owned by the Elbert family and consisted of a main house, several hired-hand houses, cattle shed, barn, and other outbuildings. In February of 1946, Martin Marietta purchased the area for mining purposes. By 1967, mining operations extended well into the area, creating the boundaries of the now Blue Heron Lake due to dredging. The mining operations came to a halt due to the Iowa Department of Natural Resources purchasing the area from Martin Marietta earlier. In 1987, the city of West Des Moines teamed up with the Iowa Department of Natural Resources to expand and develop the area. Work to start developing the area started in 1994 and more than 12 million dollars have been spent so far, with intentions to expand the area even more.

On June 15, 2025, an 18-year-old male swimmer went under the water in the designated swimming area. The West Des Moines Fire Department and a dive unit from the Des Moines Police Department was called in to help find the man. A day later on June 16, 2025, the body of the swimmer was found and was confirmed to have died from drowning.

== Amenities ==
There is a 3.2 mile loop around Blue Heron Lake with around 1 mile of the trail being a paved trail, and the rest being made of crushed rock. There is an approved proposal for a pedestrian bridge to be built, connecting the park with Walnut Woods State Park, crossing the Raccoon River. There is a 500 ft Long Beach on the north side of the lake which include accessibility with specialized beach wheelchairs. There is a boathouse next to the beach which includes rentals for canoes, kayaks, and paddle boards. A soccer and softball complex in the park can be found in the northwest and northern section of the park prospectively. Other facilities include a dog park, nature lodge, archery facility, seasonal ice rink, and a playground.

== See also ==
Park Map
