= Downtown Des Moines =

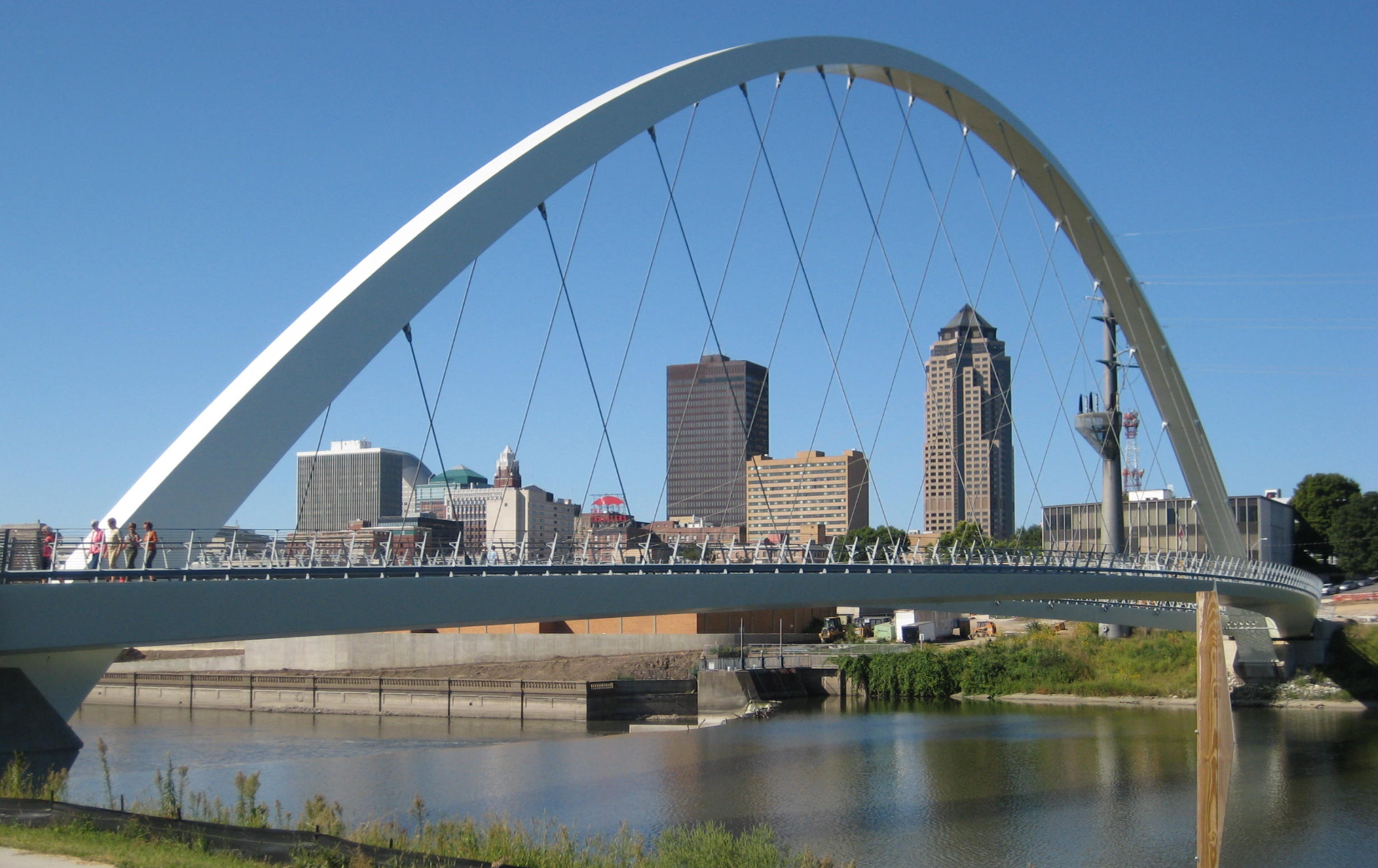
- A portion of the downtown Des Moines skyline.
- Nickname: "Hartford of the West"
- Country: United States
- State: Iowa
- Counties: Polk County
- City: Des Moines
- Elevation: 955 ft (291 m)

Population (2010)
  - Total: 5,431
- ZIP code: 50309, 50319, 50391, and 50392
- Area code: 515
- Website: http://www.downtowndesmoines.com

Downtown Des Moines is the central business district of Des Moines, Iowa and the Greater Des Moines Metropolitan Area. Downtown Des Moines is defined by the City of Des Moines as located between the Des Moines River to the east, the Raccoon River to the south, Center Street to the north, and 18th and 15th Streets to the west.

In 2014, Downtown Des Moines was listed as the number one "up-and-coming downtown" in America, by Fortune.com.

== Demographics ==
=== Population ===
As of the 2010 Census, Downtown Des Moines, including the East Village, had a population of 5,431 with a total of 3,667 housing units, with 3,085 of those being occupied.

=== Race ===
According to the 2010 Census, 70.1% of the population was white; 20.8% was Black or African American; 4.7% was Asian; 1.9% was American Indian or Alaska Native; 0.2% was Native Hawaiian or Other Pacific Islander; and 5.7% reported Other. Of these percentages, 10.6% reported as white also reported Hispanic or Latino descent. The average household size was 1.58 members per household while the average family size was 2.83 members per family.

== Economy ==
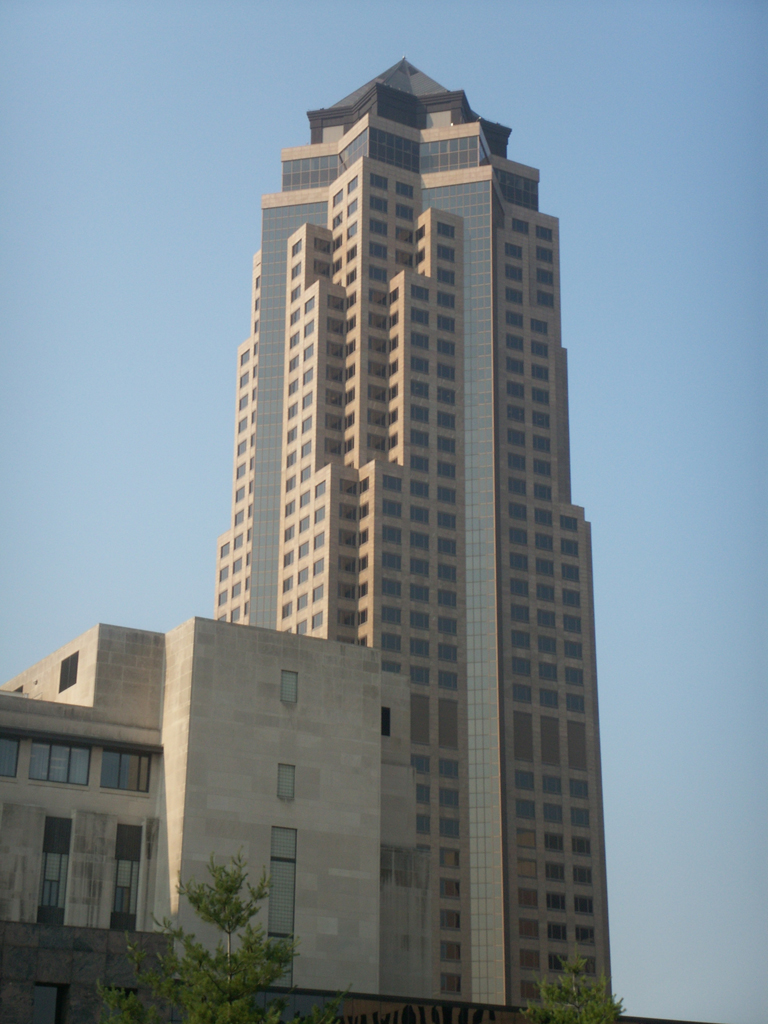
801 Grand is the tallest building in Iowa and is home to Principal Financial Group.

Downtown Des Moines is home to several major corporate campuses, including the global headquarters of Principal Financial Group. Other major employers in the area include Wellmark, Nationwide, Meredith Corporation, Voya, Wells Fargo, Banker's Trust, Ruan Transportation, and EMC Insurance Company. Several of these companies have made significant investments in downtown Des Moines through the development of large corporate campuses. One of the most notable is Principal Financial Group's 801 Grand and surrounding campus, which is currently undergoing a $397 million renovation.

== Transportation ==
Downtown Des Moines is connected to I-235, which runs past the north portion of downtown and connects downtown to I-80 and I-35. Other major thoroughfares connecting downtown to the remainder of the city are Fleur Drive, Martin Luther King, Jr. Parkway and Keosauqua Way. Major streets in downtown are Locust Street, Grand Ave, and Court Ave.

Downtown Des Moines is served by the Des Moines metro's transportation authority, Des Moines Area Regional Transit (DART). DART has several routes serving downtown, including a state-of-the-art, LEED certified transit station known as DART Central Station which opened in November 2012 and is located at 620 Cherry Street on the southend of downtown. Additionally, DART operates a free downtown shuttle on Route 42 known as the D-Line Shuttle. This shuttle runs from the steps of the Iowa State Capitol to the Pappajohn Sculpture Park.

Additionally, Des Moines is served by a wide variety of taxi cab companies. In 2014, the popular ride share service Uber was introduced, much to the dismay of the Des Moines City Council. Many members of the city council believe that Uber should follow local taxi regulations while others believe the service should operate as an app rather than a taxi service.

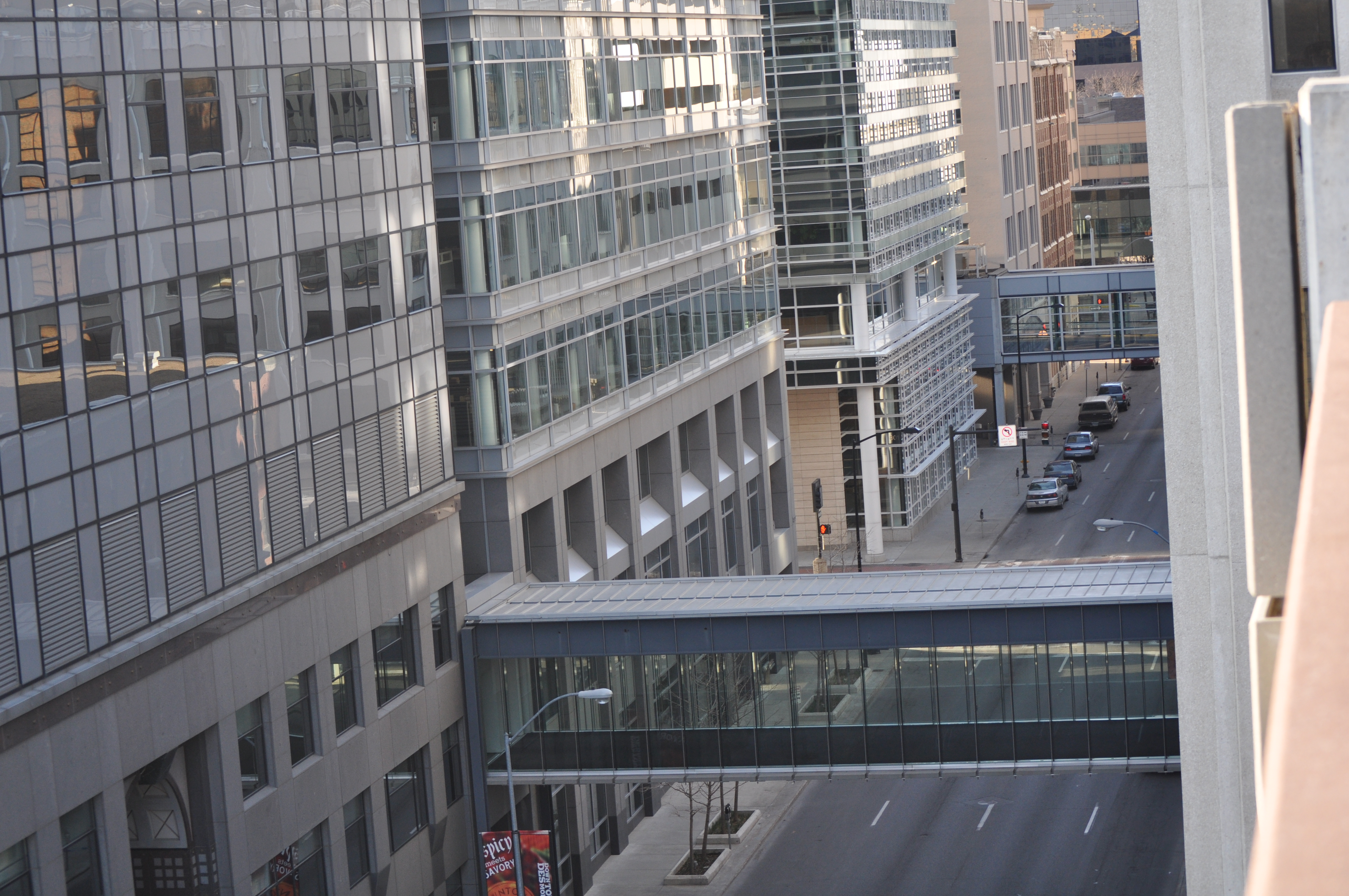
An example of a Des Moines skywalk connecting buildings. These unique connections are seen throughout Des Moines.

One unique aspect of Des Moines transportation is the expansive network of skywalks connecting the downtown buildings. The skywalk network is over four miles long and reaches as far as Casey's Center. Most of the skywalk system is air conditioned and features automatic doors. Expanded hours keep the skywalk open late into the night and early in the morning. The city has made an effort to better connect the skywalk system to the sidewalk, resulting in many new sidewalk access stairways and elevators throughout the system. The city has also created an expansive directory system to aid travelers in navigating the system.

== Neighborhoods and districts ==
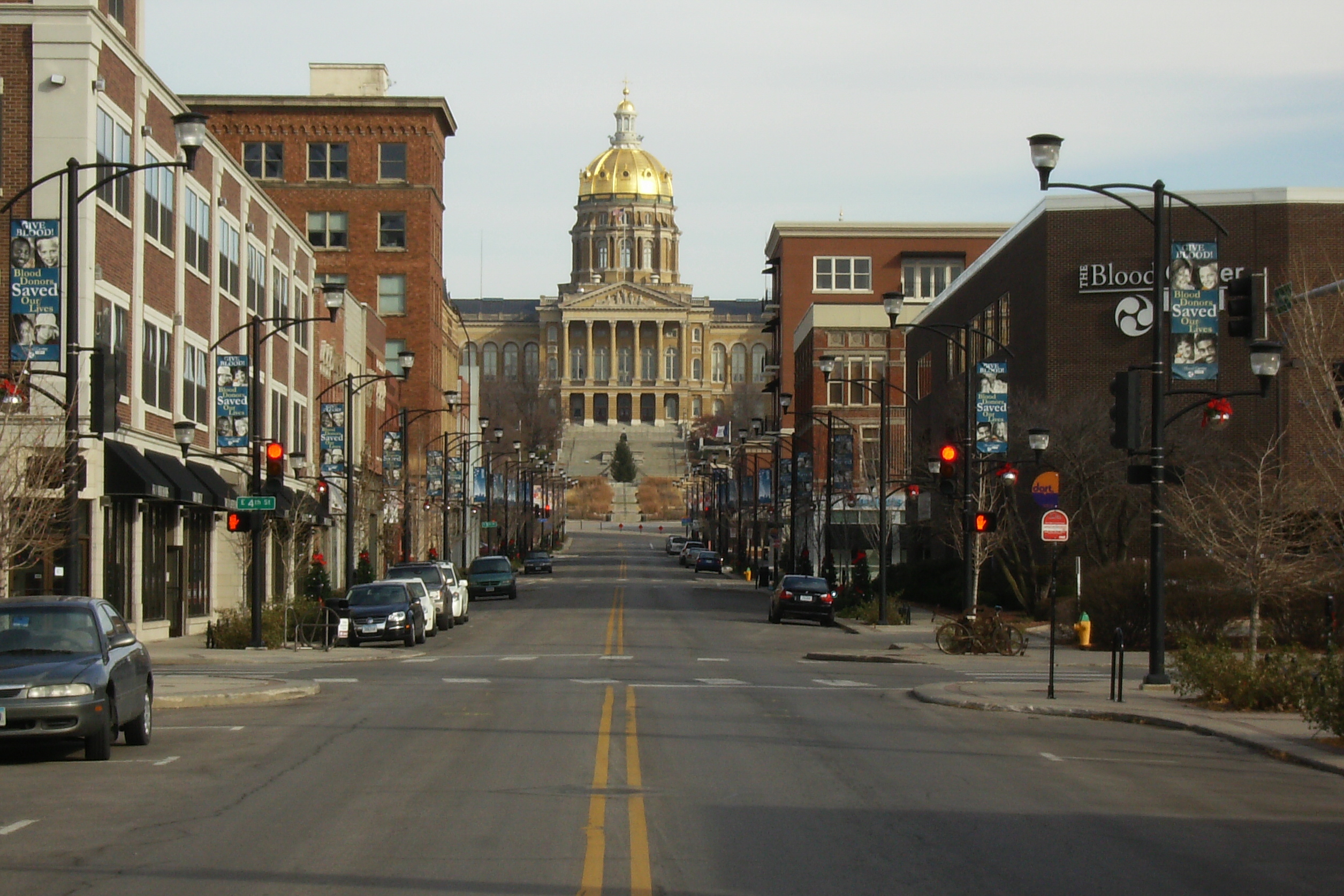
Looking east down Locust Street in the East Village towards the Iowa State Capitol.

Downtown Des Moines has many districts that each have their own individual style and culture. Downtown is also undergoing a resurgence that is quickly changing the retail and physical landscape of Des Moines.

While the Downtown Des Moines area is defined as the area between the Des Moines and Raccoon Rivers and 15th, 18th, and Center Streets, downtown includes neighborhoods extending all the way to I-235 to the north and Martin Luther King, Jr. Parkway to the west, as well as SE 14th Street to the east. With these boundaries, many new districts and neighborhoods are included.

=== Historic East Village ===
The Historic East Village lies east of the Des Moines River and west of the Iowa State Capitol. The district was once a collection of dilapidated, run-down buildings that were slated to be torn down. However, in 2000, a group of business leaders and concerned community members stepped in and began a decades-long transformation of the East Village.

Today, the East Village is a district with many fine dining, unique retail destinations, antique stores, bars and clubs. Des Moines' collection of gay bars are also located within the East Village. Within the East Village, there are many notable, nationally recognized restaurants. Many of the buildings in the East Village are included on the National Register of Historic Places.

=== Civic Center Historic District ===
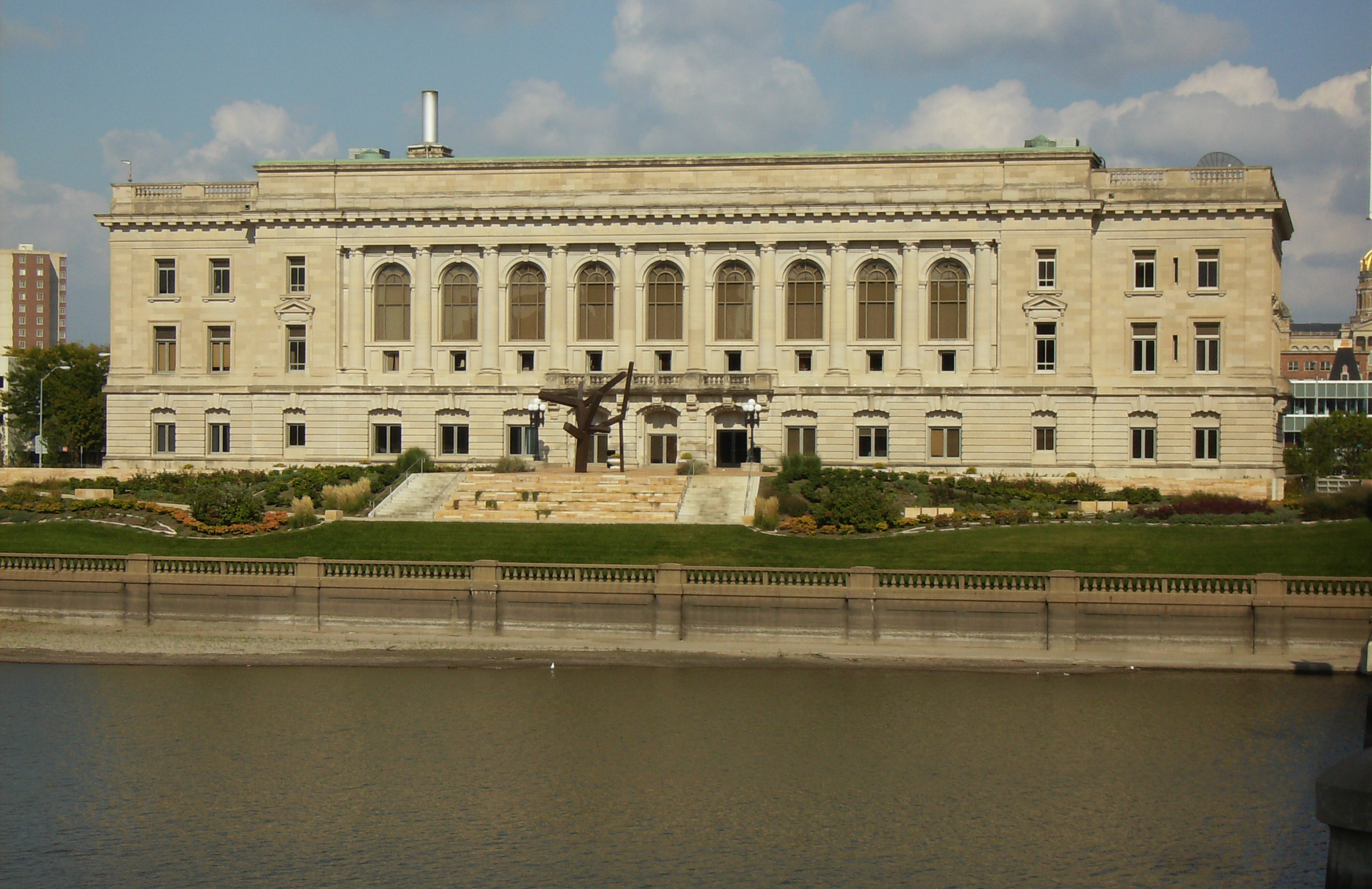
The Des Moines City Hall is a prime example of the architecture and design associated with the Civic Center Historic District

The Civic Center Historic District flanks both sides of the Des Moines and Raccoon Rivers and is listed on the National Register of Historic Places. The district is characterized by several public works buildings reflecting the Beaux-Arts style as well as ornate City Beautiful era balustrades, walkways, bridges, and lighting along the Des Moines River. Many of the buildings within the district were built between 1900 and 1928. The district still maintains much of the early 1900s era riverfront development.

=== Court Avenue District ===
The Court Avenue District is a boisterous bar and restaurant district in downtown Des Moines. The district runs along Court Avenue and is bounded by the Des Moines River on the East and the Polk County Courthouse on the west. The district is known for its excellent nightlife and many bars and restaurants and the streets are dotted with period-style lanterns, planters, and advertisements. Street advertisements painted on the sidewalks is unique to the area. Also the oldest neighborhood in Des Moines, many of the buildings are unique and historic.

Throughout the summer, the Court Avenue District also plays home to the nationally recognized Downtown Des Moines Farmers Market. The Market boast over 300 vendors and is free and open to the public. Additionally, the Des Moines Bicycle Collective offers free valet parking for bikes, which is a unique feature of the Des Moines Farmers Market.

=== Western Gateway ===
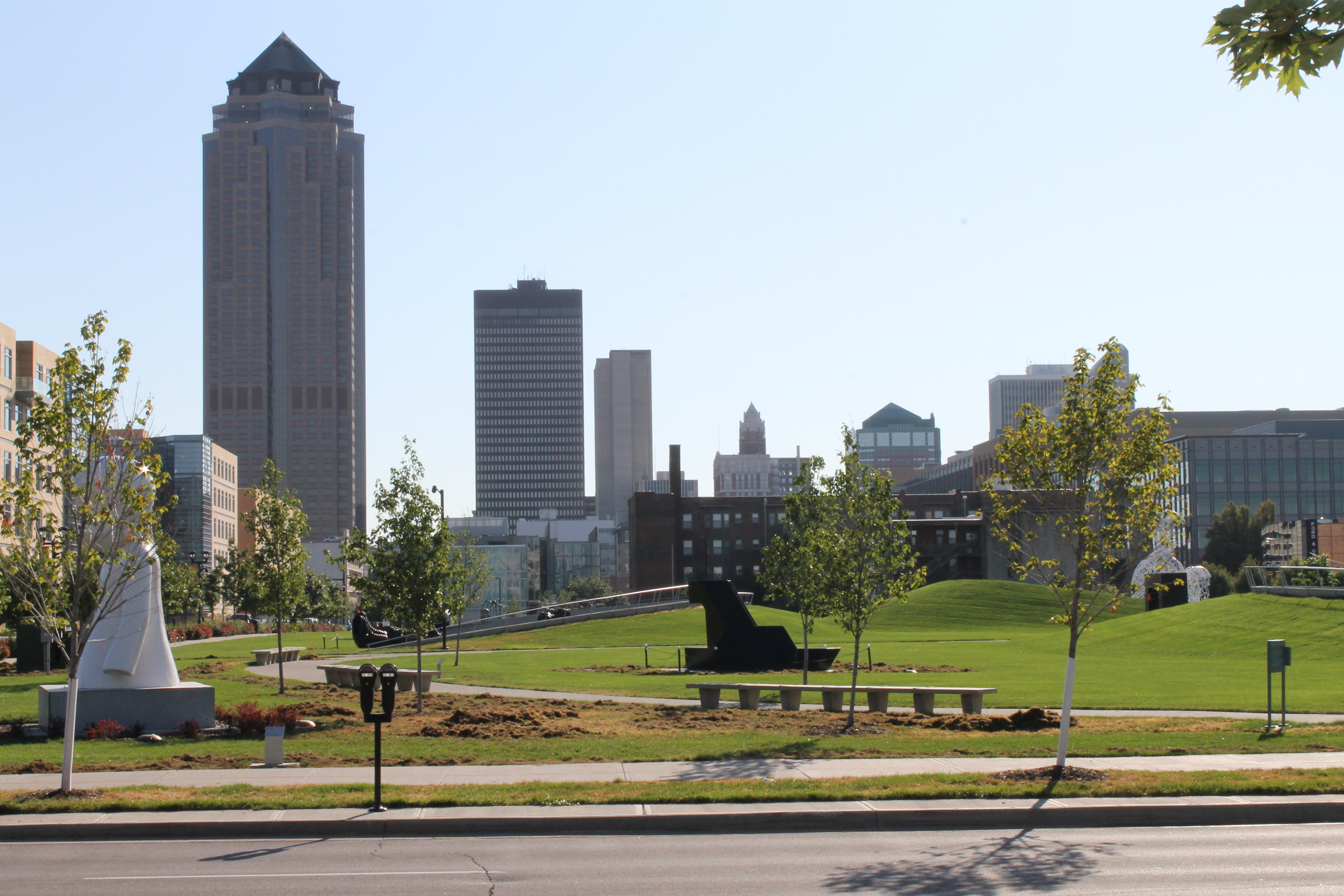
The Des Moines skyline rises above the John and Mary Pappajohn Sculpture Park in the Western Gateway.

The Western Gateway area of downtown is a modern, rehabilitated district characterized with a stunning, multimillion-dollar sculpture park and several gleaming corporate campuses. Western Gateway stretches from 10th Street in the east to 17th Street on the west, and from High Street on the North to Walnut Street to the south. Centered in the district is the John and Mary Pappajohn Sculpture Park, boasting 28 pieces of art over 4.4 acres of green park space. The sculpture park is free and open to the public and provides self-guided cell phone tours. On the eastern edge of the sculpture park is the iconic Des Moines Central Library. The library was designed by famed British architect David Chipperfield and is composed of floor to ceiling glass panels across the entire building and a green roof. The Temple for the Performing Arts also anchors the east end of the park.

Surrounding the park are several corporate campuses including the headquarters of Wellmark Blue Cross Blue Shield, Nationwide Insurance, Meredith Corporation, and ING. These buildings give the park a frame and add to the energy of the area. Additionally, Kum and Go is constructing a $92 million corporate headquarters designed by famed architect firm Renzo Piano.

=== Downtown Core ===
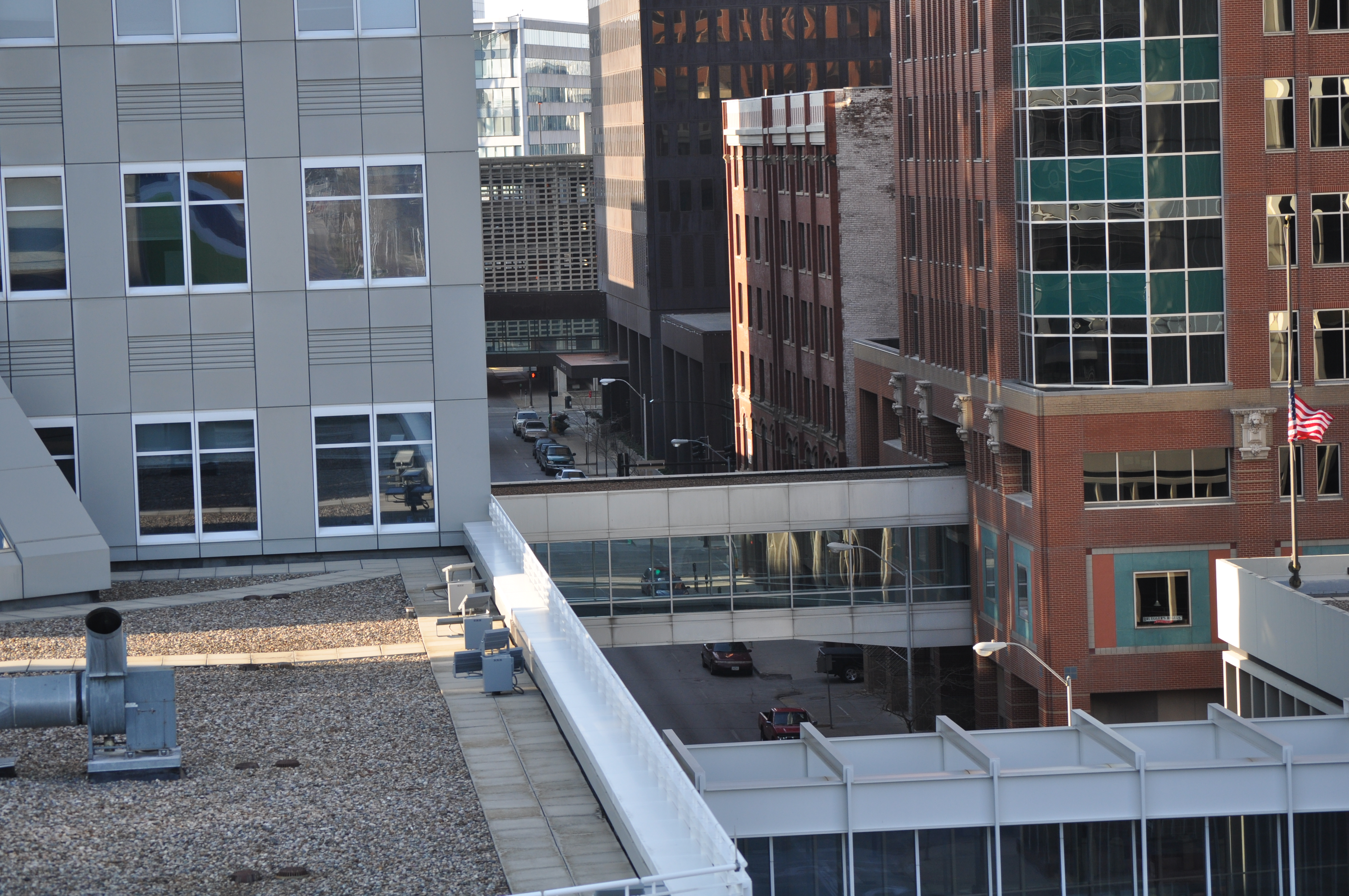
Skywalks span Walnut Street in the Central part of Downtown Des Moines.

Though the center part of downtown is generally characterized by office space, a recent transformation has begun in the center of downtown. Many of the areas high rise buildings are slowly being converted into apartments. Central Downtown contains a large downtown mall known as the Kaleidoscope at the HUB, though it has struggled in recent years to remain viable and will soon be demolished to be replaced by a high rise apartment building. Central Downtown also uses a unique skywalk system that connects nearly every building in the district on the third floor crossing city streets. Several notable buildings are located within the district including 801 Grand and the EMC Insurance Building.

Since 2013, the City of Des Moines has been planning a revitalization of the Walnut Street Corridor. The city envisions a walkable, urban pathway dotted with high end retail and restaurants. Public gathering and green space will be included alongside the completion of the newly renovated Cowles Commons.

== Parks and recreation space ==
Des Moines has a wide area of green space available to its downtown residents and visitors. The John and Mary Pappajohn Sculpture park is one example of an expensive green space available for public use. Additionally, the green areas surrounding the Des Moines Central Library and the Temple for Performing Arts are also intended for public use.

Downtown is connected to the Iowa network of trails via several trails, including the Meredith Trail. The Meredith Trail connects downtown to the adjacent Gray's Lake Park, and expansive park featuring a large lake and several walking paths and trails.

Cowles Commons is a recently completed public gathering space featuring a large sculpture and water features among trees and foliage. Cowles Commons will serve as an oasis and event space among the skyscrapers of downtown.

Opened on May 7, 2021, the 88,000 square feet Lauridsen Skatepark is currently (as of July 2021) the largest public skatepark in the United States.

=== The Principal Riverwalk ===
Running along the banks of the Des Moines river, the Principal Riverwalk is the result of a public-private partnership between the Principal Financial Group and the City of Des Moines. The Riverwalk is 1.2 miles long and includes connections across the river via the Iowa Women of Achievement Bridge and a converted train trestle bridge.

Also along the Riverwalk is the Brenton Skating Plaza, the Simon Estes Amphitheater, a dog park and a children's park. Located east of the Des Moines River and north of Grand Avenue, the skating plaza operates as an ice skating rink throughout the winter. During the summer, the plaza serves as a concert space. Also located east of the Des Moines River between East Grand Avenue and East Locust Street, the Simon Estes Amphitheater hosts outdoor concerts during the summer. A fenced in dog park can also be found along the riverwalk, located near the Iowa Women of Achievement Bridge. Additionally, a unique children's park is located near the Iowa Women of Achievement Park that was donated to the city by the Rotary Club. The park is in the shape of a fishing bobber and includes swings and seating areas for parents.

== Music, art, and culture ==
The Des Moines Symphony is based at the Civic Center of Greater Des Moines. Ballet Des Moines, primarily based out of Hoyt Sherman Place northwest of downtown, occasionally stages performances at the Civic Center as well.

The Des Moines Arts Festival, 80/35 Music Festival and the World Food and Music Festival are hosted annually in the Western Gateway Park area.

=== Entertainment venues ===
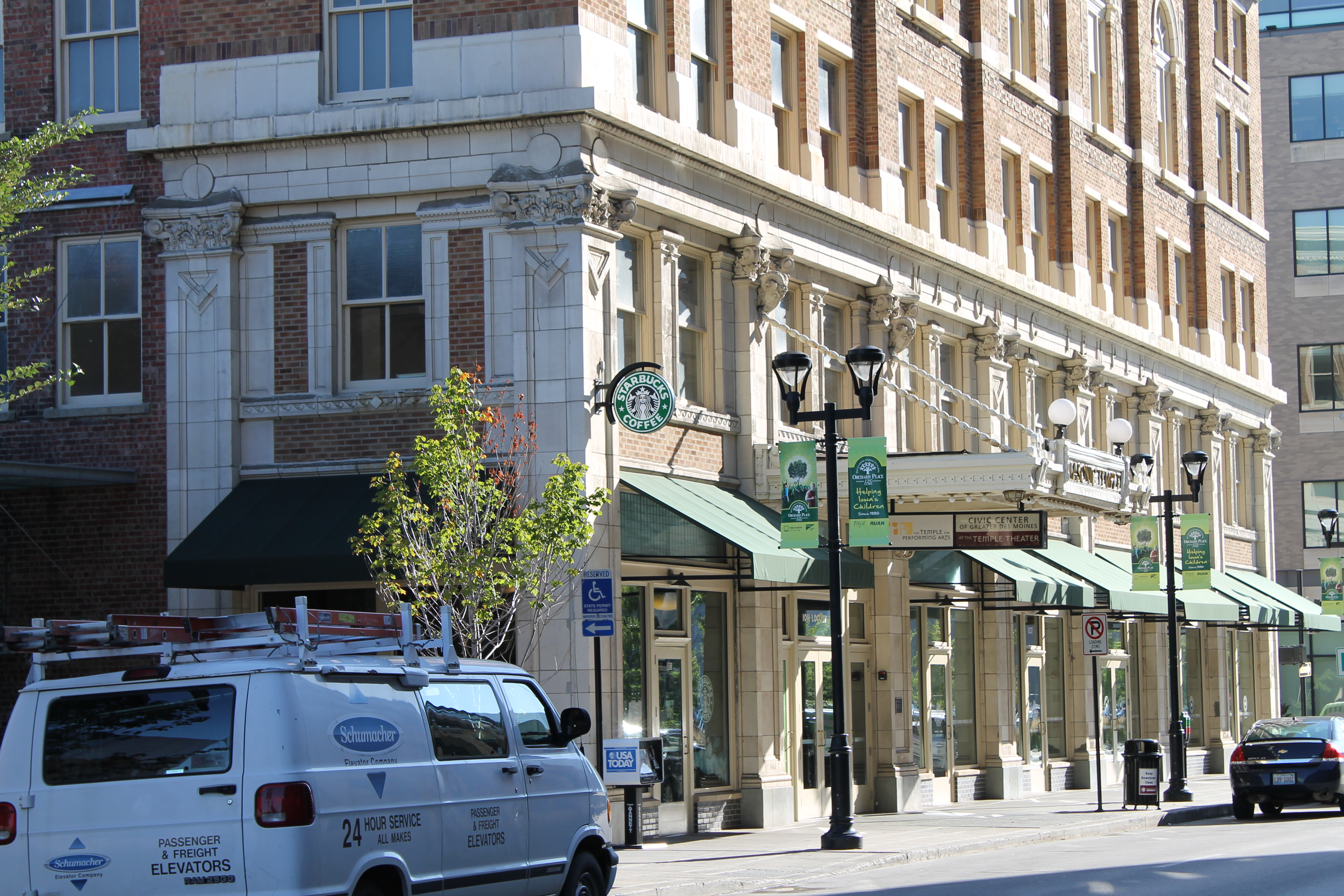
The Temple for Performing Arts in Downtown Des Moines

Downtown Des Moines is home to several entertainment venues, including the Des Moines Performing Arts Civic Center, Simon Estes Amphitheater, Casey's Center and Veterans Memorial Auditorium.

== See also ==
- Younker Brothers Department Store
