= EMC Downtown Park =

Park in Des Moines

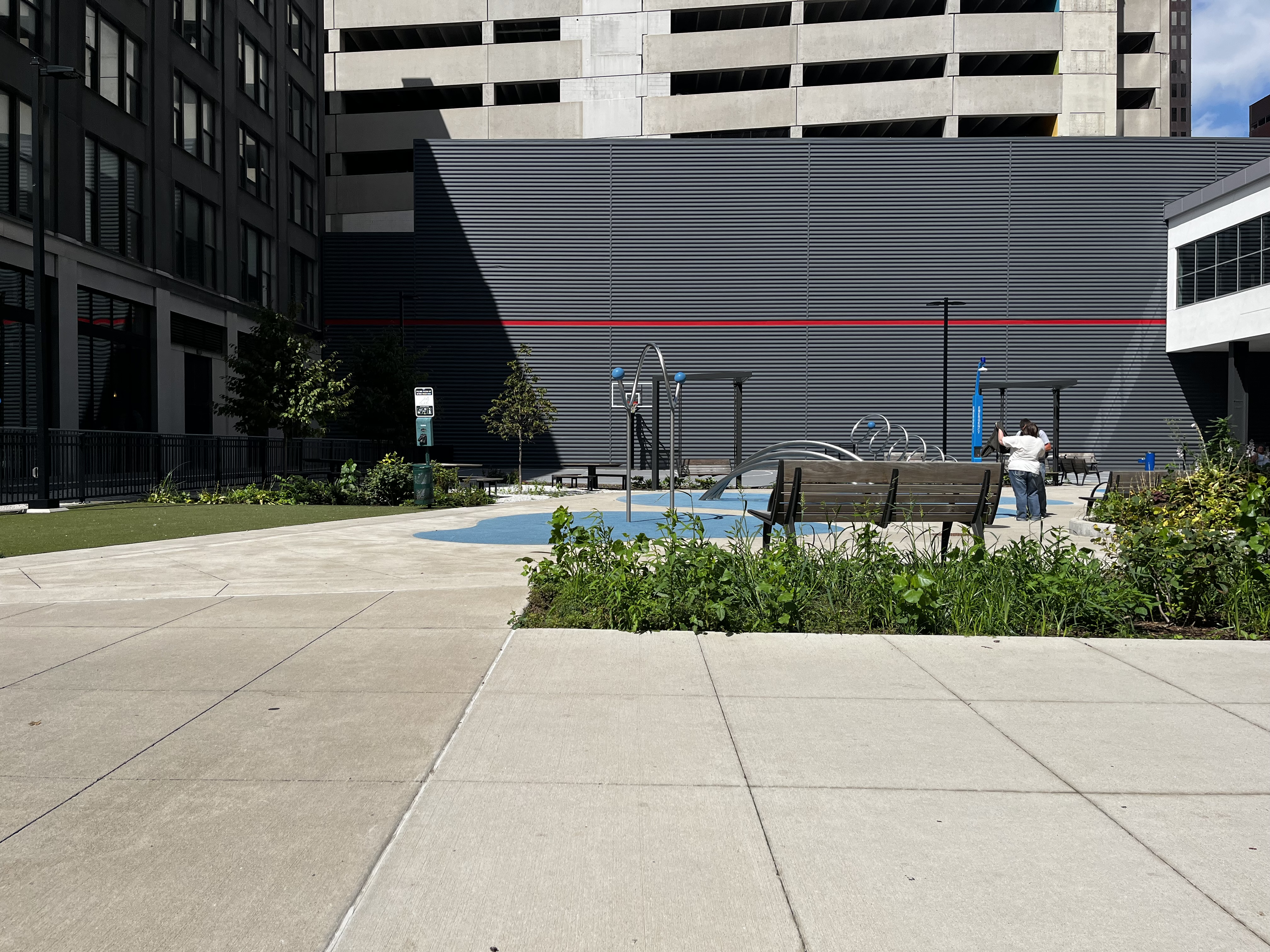
- Interactive map of EMC Downtown Park
- Type: Urban park
- Location: Downtown Des Moines
- Coordinates: 41°35′8.502″N 93°37′33.715″W
- Area: 0.397 acres (0.161 ha)
- Opened: 2023
- Owner: EMC Insurance

EMC Downtown Park is an urban park located in the central business district of Des Moines, Iowa. The park was built after a fire on March 29, 2014, burned down the Younker Brothers Department Store. EMC Insurance acquired the property in 2018. It originally planned to expand its headquarters but decided to partner with the city of Des Moines to build a park instead.

== History ==
On March 29, 2014, a fire caused the top floors of the Younker Brothers Department Store to burn down. It caused damage to the skywalk and nearby buildings. It sat as a vacant lot until 2018, when EMC Insurance acquired the lot. Instead of building office space, the company decided to partner with the city of Des Moines to build a park instead, and proposed an agreement to keep the green space for at least 10 years.

The park started construction in 2021, mainly focused for the residents living in downtown. On June 1, 2023, the park opened and currently serves 2,400 residents within a 10-minute walk, helping the cities goal to have a park within 10 minutes of every citizen. The park includes A half-court basketball court, a pickleball court, playground equipment, a ping-pong table, bags game, and table games (chess/checkers).

== See also ==
List of parks in Polk County, Iowa

Downtown Des Moines
