= The Lost Planet =

The Lost Planet may refer to:

- The Lost Planet (serial), a 1953 American science fiction serial film
- The Lost Planet (novel), a 1953 juvenile science fiction novel by Angus MacVicar
- The Lost Planet (Des Moines), the former dumping site for lime filtered out of the water supply of Des Moines, Iowa
- The Lost Planet, a working title of Lost Planet Airmen, a 1951 American science fiction film

== See also ==
- Lost Planet, a video game series
