= Water Works Park (Des Moines) =

Public park in Des Moines, Iowa, USA

- Interactive map of Water Works Park
- Type: Urban park
- Nearest city: Des Moines, Iowa
- Coordinates: 41.565°N 93.671°W
- Area: 1,500 acres (6,100,000 m^{2})
- Opened: 1933
- Operator: Des Moines Water Works
- Website: Official website

Water Works Park is a 1,500-acre park southwest of downtown Des Moines, Iowa and contains the Des Moines Water Works (DMWW) which is a publicly owned municipal water utility that supplies the greater Des Moines metropolitan area. It is one of the largest urban parks in the United States. Located along the Raccoon River west of Fleur Drive, the park offers trails, picnic areas, grills, and fields.

== Arboretum ==
The park is home to the Arie den Boer Arboretum, one of the world's largest collection of crab apple trees, containing approximately 300 varieties. The arboretum was developed under the care of arborist Arie den Boer, in whose honor the arboretum was named in 1961. The Des Moines Water Works staff now maintains through pruning and propagation. Today, the arboretum includes approximately 1,200 trees in the collection.

== Founder's Statue: John Karras and Donald Kaul ==
On Saturday, April 17, 2021, RAGBRAI Founder's Statue of Des Moines Register features writer and copy editor John Karras and two-time Pulitzer finalist Washington columnist Donald Kaul were dedicated in Water Works Park. The bronze statue was designed by Gail Folwell. Beginning in November 2015, both T.J. Juskiewicz, a longtime director of RAGBRAI, and Carl Voss, a former Des Moines Register photographer who both rode and shot the inaugural RAGBRAI, spearheaded the effort to dedicate a statue to Karras and Kaul in downtown Des Moines and originally envisioned the bronze statue to be placed "near the confluence of the Des Moines and Raccoon rivers just down the street from the Register's current headquarters at Capital Square and within eyeshot of Principal Park".

== RAGBRAI ==
The western portion of Water Works Park was the campground for tens of thousands of bicyclists during RAGBRAI XLI in 2013 and will again be the site of the RAGBRAI campground for numerous cyclists including both tents and RVs during RAGBRAI L in 2023. Although RAGBRAI director Matt Phippen planned more than 100,000 riders on the 50-mile (80 km) route on Wednesday July 26, 2023, from Ames to Des Moines to break RAGBRAI’s single-day attendance record of 40,000, who rode the 39.9-mile (64.2 km) route from Winterset to Indianola on Tuesday, July 23, 2019, he wanted to also break the Guinness World Record for the largest single-day bicycle ride, which was set on June 11, 2000, as 48,615 cyclists rode an 18.2-mile (29.3 km) course at Udine, Italy, but, in early June 2023, Guinness World Records discontinued the world record category for the "largest parade of bicycles" by retiring the Udine record. According to Kylie Galloway, who is the United States spokesperson for Guinness World Records, "Within our application process, we provide the applicant with guidelines that are specific to that record category and must be adhered to, to qualify. It is necessary these guidelines are followed to uphold the integrity, accuracy, and authenticity of each record title." For RAGBRAI, the Iowa State Patrol are the official record-keepers of daily rider counts.

== Lauridsen Amphitheater ==
The park has frequently hosted large festivals and concerts. For example on Tuesday, June 27, 2023, the Lauridsen Amphitheater located at 2251 George Flagg Parkway in the eastern portion of Water Works Park hosted Willie Nelson & Family during the Field Daze Music Series. It will also host Styx on July 14, 2023, and, during RAGBRAI L, will host a free Lynyrd Skynyrd concert on Wednesday, July 26, 2023, during which the Water Works Park staff expect at least 35,000 to 50,000 concert goers in attendance. Completed in May 2019, the $1.9 million Lauridsen Amphitheater hosts events on its northside with 2,000 to 25,000 participants. It consists of the amphitheater stage which is under a 2,125 square feet ellipses-shaped canopy of claded color-shifting aluminum composite material measuring 65 feet wide by 45 feet long and supported by two intertwining tree limb-like steel legs that are 23 feet in height on the south and 31 feet on the north. Since the Lauridsen Amphitheater was not built during RAGBRAI XLI in 2013 when Des Moines hosted RAGBRAI XLI in 2013 and had the RAGBRAI campground at the western portion of Water Works Park, many RAGBRAI activities were held in downtown Des Moines along Court Avenue including the evening RAGBRAI concert which was held at the Principal Riverwalk. On July 12–13, 2024, the 15th 80/35 Music Festival will be held in Water Works Park utilizing the Lauridsen Amphitheater according to Sam Carrell who is the executive director of the Water Works Park Foundation. Previously, Eighty Thirty-Five Music Festival was held from 2009 until 2023 at the Western Gateway Park in downtown Des Moines.

The Killinger Family Stage is located on the south side of the Lauridsen Amphitheater and often hosts events of less than 2,000.

== Des Moines Biergarten ==
Established in September 2022, the Des Moines Biergarten is located just east of Lauridsen Amphitheater and will be open from Wednesday to Sunday beginning May 17, 2023, until the fall of 2023.

== Other events ==
Every winter, the park hosts Jolly Holiday Lights, a holiday light display. Large portions of the Des Moines Marathon and Hy-Vee Triathlon pass through the park.

== Lot 46 Valley Gardens TCE Superfund Site ==
In 2004, the Iowa DNR discovered a hazardous waste site near Des Moines Water Works Park and referred the matter to the United States Environmental Protection Agency which took over the site for federal assistance in 2020 and, in June 2023, was recommending that the Lot 46 Valley Gardens TCE Superfund Site be placed on the National Priorities List in March 2024 because the cis-1,2-DCE, which is a breakdown product of trichlorethylene (TCE), is in the nearby groundwater and is migrating toward the park according to Lauren Murphy, who is the remedial project manager of the EPA.

== See also ==
- The Lost Planet (Des Moines)
