= Des Moines Arts Festival =

Annual art festival held in Iowa, U.S.

- Genre: Arts festival
- Dates: 3 days (Last Weekend in June)
- Locations: Western Gateway Park, Des Moines, Iowa, United States
- Years active: 1998–Present
- Attendance: 200,000+ (Estimate)
- Website: Des Moines Arts Festival

The Des Moines Arts Festival is an arts festival held every June in Western Gateway Park in Des Moines, Iowa. The three-day festival frequently draws in excess of 200,000 people and has been ranked among the top festivals in the United States.

== History ==
The arts festival has its roots in the Des Moines Arts Center's Art in the Park, which started in 1958. Originally held in the parking lot of the Arts Center, the event eventually moved to a nearby park and later the Iowa State Fairgrounds.

Following the 1997 event, organizers decided to move the festival downtown and rebranded the event as the Des Moines Arts Festival. With the more prominent location, three-day attendance increased to over 200,000 people, and a more national artist list was attracted. When construction limited access to its location on the bridges over the Des Moines River in 2006, the festival moved to its current location in the newly opened Western Gateway Park. Living performing artists debuted in 2009; previous performers have included Gavin DeGraw and Mat Kearney.

== Recognition ==
Since its move, the festival has frequently been ranked among the top in the nation.

== Sponsors ==
The festival has numerous sponsors supporting it. Primary sponsors include Nationwide Insurance, Hy-Vee, Meredith Corporation, Prairie Meadows, Principal Financial Group, and The Des Moines Register.
