= Western Gateway Park =

Urban park located in downtown Des Moines, Iowa

- Interactive map of Western Gateway Park
- Type: Urban Park
- Location: Des Moines, IA, United States
- Coordinates: 41.585°N 93.635°W
- Area: 13 acres (5.3 ha)
- Created: 2006
- Operator: City of Des Moines
- Status: Public
- Public transit: (DART)
- Website: Official website

Western Gateway Park is an urban park located in downtown Des Moines, Iowa. Opened in 2006, the park has served as the host to political rallies, the Des Moines Arts Festival, the 80/35 Music Festival, and various athletic events and festivals.

The central branch of the Des Moines Public Library, the Temple for Performing Arts, and the Des Moines center for the University of Iowa are located within the park. In 2009, 4.4 acres of the park were converted from open green space to a sculpture park, known as the John and Mary Pappajohn Sculpture Park. The Pappajohns' contributed 28 works to the park - the most significant donation of artwork ever made to the Des Moines Art Center. The sculpture park is administered by the Des Moines Art Center and contains work by many artists such as Louise Bourgeois, Jaume Plensa, Deborah Butterfield, and Judith Shea.

On October 31, 2008, the 44th president of the United States, Barack Obama held a rally and gave a speech in the park just four days before being elected president.

Another Western Gateway Park is located in Penn Valley, California as part of the Western Gateway Recreation & Park District.

In 2019, the Krause Gateway Center opened designed by famed architect Renzo Piano located on the park's edge.
