= Principal Riverwalk =

Recreational park in the center of Des Moines

Coordinates: 41.585217°N 93.616329°W

Principal Riverwalk is a recreational park district along the banks of the Des Moines River in downtown Des Moines, Iowa. After eight years of work, it was completed in January 2013.

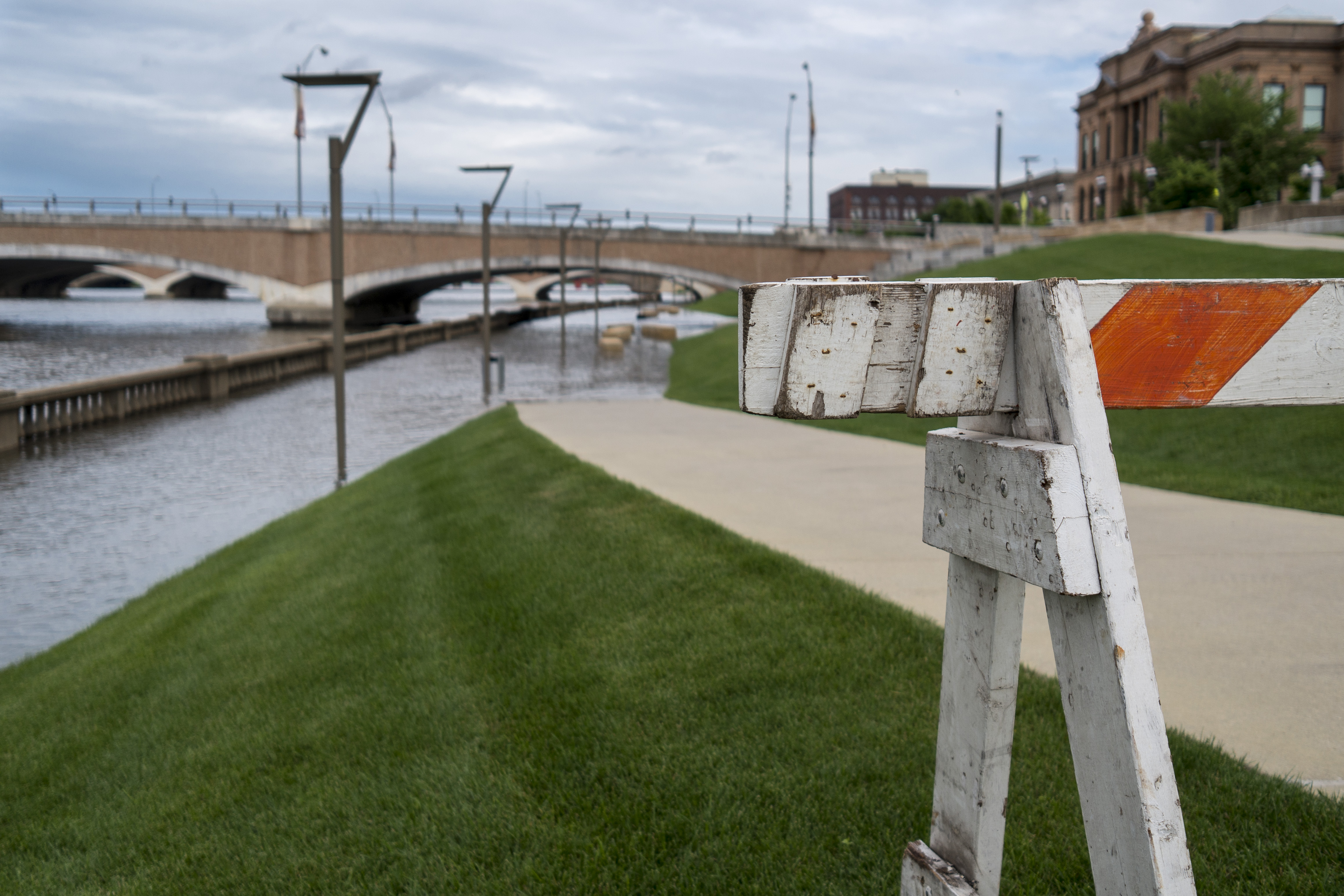
Flooded walkway in 2015

Funded by the city of Des Moines, Principal Financial and the Iowa state government, Principal Riverwalk features a 1.2-mile (1.9 km) recreational trail connecting the east and west sides of downtown via two pedestrian bridges. Trails connect the Court Avenue District, central business district, East Village, Greater Des Moines Botanical Garden, Iowa Events Center and Gray's Lake with other metro area recreational trails. A landscaped promenade along the street level connects the riverfront amphitheater and several plazas, including an outdoor ice skating rink and summertime fountain plaza. A series of civic gardens with sculptures are located near Des Moines City Hall. Meredith Corporation contributed $2 million to fund the Meredith Trail, a pathway connecting Gray's Lake with the MLK Trail via the George Washington Carver Bridge.

Although the RAGBRAI campground during RAGBRAI XLI in 2013 was west of downtown Des Moines at the Des Moines Water Works Park, many RAGBRAI activities were held in downtown Des Moines along Court Avenue including the evening RAGBRAI concert which was held at the Principal Riverwalk. The Lauridsen Amphitheater in Des Moines Water Works Park was not built during RAGBRAI XLI in 2013 so, when the RAGBRAI campground for RAGBRAI L in 2023 was once again at Des Moines Water Works Park while Des Moines hosted RAGBRAI, however, the Lauridsen Amphitheater hosted the evening RAGBRAI concert featuring Lynyrd Skynyrd on Wednesday, July 26, 2023.
