= Hy-Vee Multiplex Powered by the City of Grimes =

Sports complex in Grimes, Iowa

- Interactive map of Hy-Vee Multiplex Powered by the City of Grimes
- Type: Sports complex
- Location: Grimes, Iowa
- Coordinates: 41°42′15.966″N 93°46′50.221″W
- Area: 50 acres (20 ha)
- Opened: 2023

Hy-Vee Multiplex Powered by the City of Grimes is a sport complex located in Grimes, Iowa. There are 50 acres (20 ha) of soccer fields, softball fields, and baseball fields. In 2024, Hy-Vee Multiplex Powered by the City of Grimes and surrounding businesses have logged 2.1 million visits, according to the city.

== History ==
In August of 2021, officials broke ground on the site with the original name being "Grimesplex" named after the city. It was part of the Hope Entertainment District which aimed at investing a 240 acres (97 ha) plot of land, including Grimesplex, and making it the source of nearly $400 million in investments. In November of 2024, the facility announced a new naming deal with the midwestern supermarket chain Hy-Vee for five years to call it the "Hy-Vee Multiplex Powered by the City of Grimes". Hy-Vee will pay $100,000 a year for 5 years for the name.

== See also ==
List of parks in Polk County, Iowa
