= Pappajohn Sculpture Park =

Sculpture Park in Des Moines, Iowa

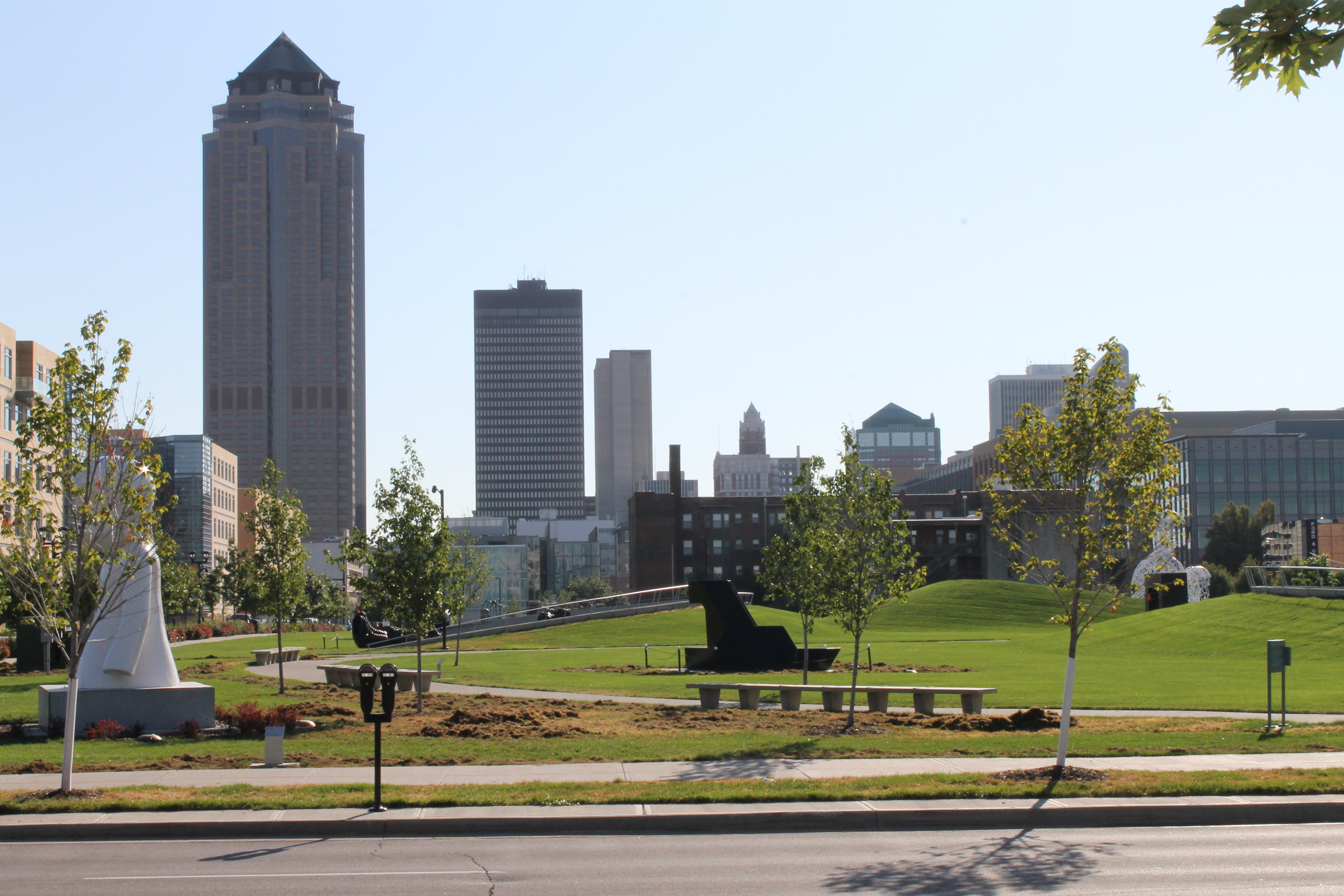
- View of the Pappajohn Sculpture Park

- Location within Iowa Location within the United States
- Type: Urban park
- Location: Des Moines, Iowa, United States
- Coordinates: 41°35′07″N 93°38′07″W
- Area: 4.4 acres (1.8 ha)
- Created: 2009
- Operator: City of Des Moines and Des Moines Art Center
- Status: Public
- Website: Official website

The John and Mary Pappajohn Sculpture Park is a 4.4-acre (1.8 ha) park within Western Gateway Park in Des Moines, Iowa. It opened in 2009 with 24 sculptures, with four more acquired later. The sculpture park is administered by the Des Moines Art Center and contains works by artists such as Louise Bourgeois, Jaume Plensa, Ai Weiwei, and Barry Flanagan. It is considered "one of the most significant collections of outdoor sculptures in the United States".

== History ==
The park is named for John Pappajohn, a local venture capitalist, and his wife Mary Louise Pappajohn (1933-2022), who gifted the initial 24 sculptures, with a valuation of about $40 million USD, to the city of Des Moines. The couple are recognized art collectors, appearing in the ARTnews list of top 200 art collectors from 1998 to 2014. The first sculptures donated for the park were originally part of the Pappajohns' private collection, and located in their yard. Before they were moved to Western Gateway Park, people used to drive by their home to look at the art.

Diana Agrest and Mario Gandelsonas, two New York based architects, designed the landscape with grassy mounds and parabolic-shaped cutaways. These cutouts create walled-in spaces used to display the sculptures in groups of related artistic styles.

The Pappajohn sculpture park was the capstone of the broad redevelopment project that revitalized downtown Des Moines. In the early 2000s, the west end of downtown Des Moines was in a dilapidated state, with auto repair shops, seedy businesses, and worn out and vacant buildings. The city decided to remediate the situation and created Western Gateway park from 10th to 15th street, demolishing derelict buildings and moving a historic apartment complex to another site. Development of Western Gateway and the addition of the sculpture park enhanced the real estate value and drove new investments to the area. At its inauguration in 2009, the sculpture park was an optimistic counterpoint to the Great Recession, and to the destruction across Iowa caused by floods and tornadoes the previous year.

In 2011, White ghost by Yoshitomo Nara was installed in the park, after being exhibited in New York, as public art placed near the entrances to the Asia Society and the Park Avenue Armory.

In 2012, the Des Moines Symphony debuted composer Steve Heitzeg's Symphony in Sculpture, a 25-minute work commissioned for the Pappajohn Sculpture Park and for the 75th season of the Des Moines Symphony itself. It is divided into nine short movements, each representing one of the sculptures in the park. Music critic Michael Morain of The Des Moines Register felt the piece was too short, but said that "the music matches the sculptures with just a few thoughtful strokes." Symphony in Sculpture II followed in 2015, covering six more sculptures and including windchimes made from chakra stones and olive branches, a steel mixing bowl from Heitzeg's late mother's kitchen, and trilobite and whalebone fossils. 2019's Symphony in Sculpture III pays tribute to three more sculptures, including a sculpture by Ai Weiwei.

The Des Moines Art Center was the 2017 recipient of the Art Conservation Project grant from Bank of America, given for the restoration of Keith Haring's Untitled (Three Dancing Figures, version C). The sculpture was structurally sound, but the paint coating had deteriorated from years of outdoor public display.

In 2018, Pumpkin Large by Japanese artist Yayoi Kusama was installed in the park. The bronze pumpkin is about 8 feet high, including a 3-foot pedestal. The surface has a pattern of recessed dots of different sizes, going all the way up to the stem. According to Jeff Fleming, director of the Des Moines Art Center, the piece is a “definitive work by one of the most important contemporary artists working today”.

A version of Robert Indiana's iconic LOVE sculpture was placed in the park in 2019.

== Sculptures ==
=== List of artwork ===
Currently there are 28 sculptures in the park:

- Reclining figure (1982) by Willem de Kooning
- Gymnast III (1985) by William G. Tucker
- Untitled (1985) by Joel Shapiro
- In the morning (1986) by Anthony Caro
- Five plate pentagon (1986) by Richard Serra
- T8 (1987) by Mark Di Suvero
- Juno (1989) and Ancient Forest (2009) by Deborah Butterfield
- Marriage (1989) by Tony Smith
- Order (1989) by Tony Cragg
- Decoy (1990) by Martin Puryear
- Post Balzac (1990) by Judith Shea
- Seating for eight (1990) and Café Table 1 (1992) by Scott Burton
- Untitled (1994) by Ellsworth Kelly
- Thinker on a Rock (1997) by Barry Flanagan
- Spider (1997) by Louise Bourgeois
- LOVE (1999) by Robert Indiana
- Back of a Snowman (black) (2002) and Back of Snowman (white) (2002) by Gary Hume
- Willy (2005) by Tony Smith
- Moonrise.east.january (2005) and Moonrise.east.august (2006) by Ugo Rondinone
- air gets into everything even nothing (2006) by Ugo Rondinone
- Nomade (2007) by Jaume Plensa
- Untitled (Three Dancing Figures, version C) (2009) by Keith Haring
- White Ghost (2010) by Yoshitomo Nara
- Panoramic Awareness pavilion (2013) by Olafur Eliasson
- Iron tree trunk (2015) by Ai Weiwei
- Pumpkin Large (2018) by Yayoi Kusama

=== Selected works ===
Nomade

==== Nomade (2007) by Jaume Plensa ====
One of the most arresting and iconic pieces in the Pappajohn Sculpture Park is Nomade by Spanish sculptor Jaume Plensa, which dominates the landscape over Locust Street. The sculpture was originally exhibited in 2007, in the then newly restored Saint-Jaume bastion, in Antibes. Subsequently, the sculpture was acquired by Mary and John Pappajohn in Miami, while the city of Antibes Juan-les-Pins ordered a similar work by Plensa to be installed there permanently.

The sculpture is a 6-short-ton (5.4 t), 27-foot-tall (8.2 m) crouching human shape made of a lattice of white painted steel letters. The sculpture is hollow and visitors can walk inside to look through the spaces between the letters. This work exemplifies Plensa's exploration of communication issues between individuals or cultures, as well as his interest in literature and the human body. The letters do not form meaningful words, but rather express the symbolic essence of language. In a Des Moines Register poll about 75 percent of the people surveyed chose Nomade as the piece they most connected with.

== See also ==
- List of sculpture parks
