= MacRae Park =

Park in Des Moines, Iowa

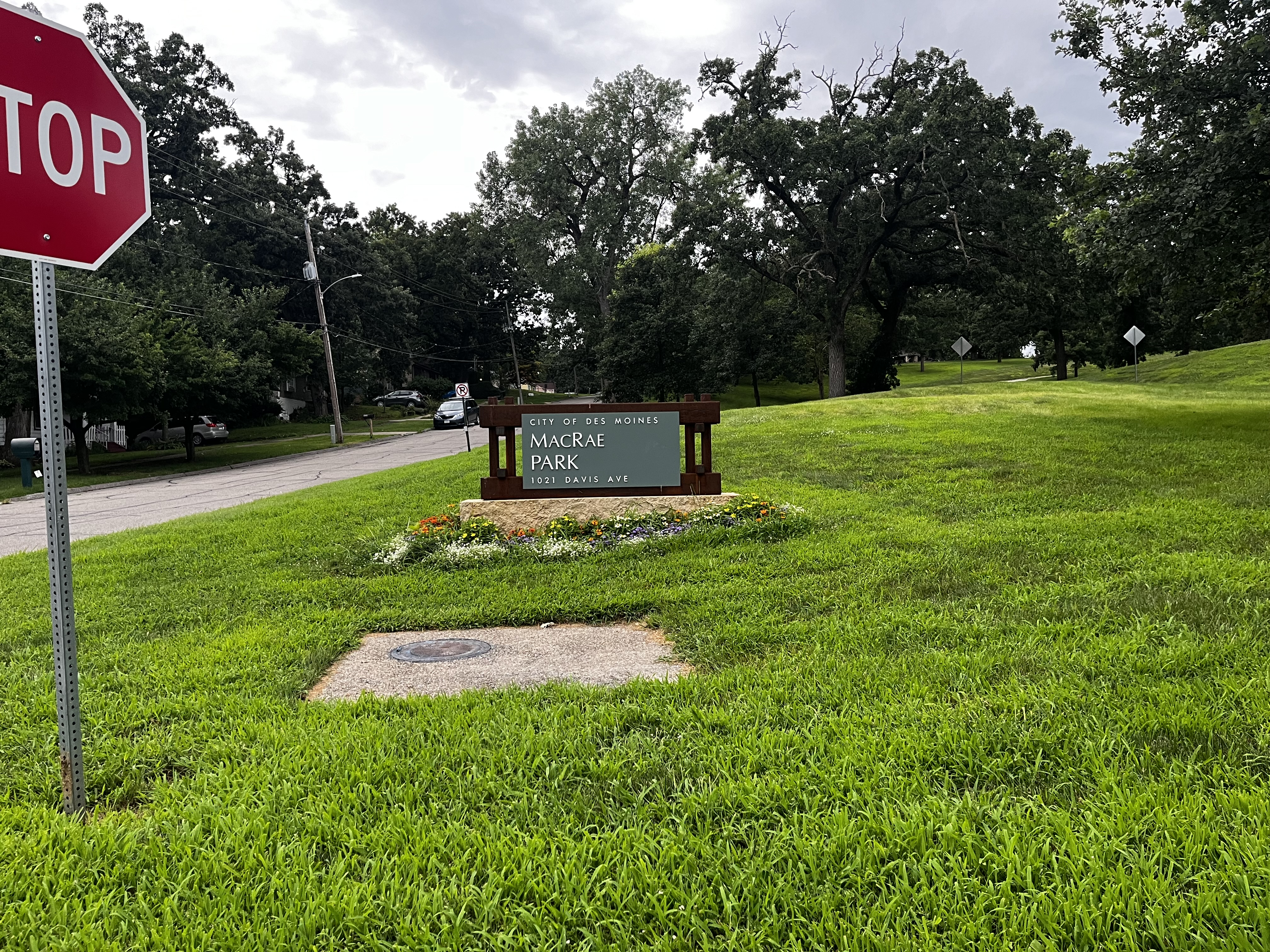
- Park entrance
- Interactive map of MacRae Park
- Type: Urban park
- Location: Des Moines, Iowa
- Coordinates: 41°34′6.762″N 93°37′31.782″W
- Area: 50.9 acres
- Owner: City of Des Moines
- Website: https://www.dsm.city/business_detail_T6_R66.php

MacRae Park is an urban park located in Des Moines, Iowa. The park has 50.9 acres which includes playgrounds, a scenic overlook, and a pond. The park is in the Gray's Lake Neighbourhood and is owned and operated by the City of Des Moines. The park is named after Donald MacRae, a graduate of Drake University and a soldier in the 168th infantry who was the first Iowan casualty of World War I.

On October 2, 2019, the park added a scenic overlook that looks towards Des Moines which is 96 feet long and the tip of it hovers 40 feet above the hillside, with LED lights installed. On June 28, 2023, new improvements to the park opened to the public after a $2.75 million project that lasted more than 7 years. The original plans for the project were approved on March 8, 2021. This project added a bike friendly loop around the park, a boardwalk overlooking the pond, and a new playscape.
