= Des Moines Art Center =

Art museum in Des Moines, Iowa

- Established: 1948
- Location: 4700 Grand Avenue; Des Moines, Iowa
- Director: Kelly Baum
- Website: www.desmoinesartcenter.org
- Des Moines Art Center
- U.S. National Register of Historic Places
- Location within Iowa Location within the United States
- Location: 4700 Grand Ave., Des Moines, Iowa, United States
- Coordinates: 41°35′02″N 93°40′54″W
- Built: 1948
- Architect: Eliel Saarinen (1948 building); I. M. Pei (1968 addition); Richard Meier (1985 addition)
- Architectural style: International Style
- NRHP reference No.: 03000063
- Added to NRHP: October 19, 2004

The Des Moines Art Center is an art museum with an extensive collection of paintings, sculpture, modern art and mixed media. It was established in 1948 in Des Moines, Iowa.

== History ==
The Art Center traces its roots to 1916, when the Des Moines Association of Fine Arts established gallery space at the Public Library of Des Moines on the banks of the Des Moines River downtown. Several exhibitions were shown each year, and works of art were periodically purchased for the association's permanent collection. In 1938, the DMAF moved their collection to a building on Walnut Street. Planning for a permanent building began in 1943 after a sizeable donation from the trust of James D. Edmundson. In 1945, DMAF evolved into the Des Moines Art Center. A site along Grand Avenue in the city's Greenwood Park was designated as the preferred location. Construction began in 1945; the museum itself opened in 1948, with additional wings constructed in 1968 and 1985.

In 2009, the Art Center expanded its mission to operate the Pappajohn Sculpture Park, located in Western Gateway Park downtown.

== Collection ==
Artists included in the permanent collection are Edward Hopper, Jasper Johns, Andy Warhol, Henri Matisse, Claude Monet, Francis Bacon, Georgia O'Keeffe, Gerhard Richter, Claes Oldenburg, Mary Cassatt, Auguste Rodin, Grant Wood, Deborah Butterfield, Paul Gauguin, Eva Hesse, Ronnie Landfield, Roy Lichtenstein, George Segal, Mark Rothko, John Singer Sargent, Joseph Cornell and Takashi Murakami.

Some paintings from the collection are well known examples of the artist and/or movement they represent. These include Edward Hopper's Automat from 1927, which was reproduced on a postage stamp as well as used for a cover of Time, Stanton MacDonald Wright's Synchromy which has been reproduced in numerous texts about the artist/movement, Francis Bacon's Portrait of Pope Innocent from 1953 which likewise is considered a signature work by the artist and appeared in Robert Hughes' BBC series The Shock of the New in the early 1980s.

== Facilities ==
A large main gallery rotates through several exhibitions throughout the year, most of which are featured from one to three months at a time. These shows include solo shows by internationally recognized artists, travelling shows from other institutions, and group shows organized around a theme. The rest of the museum space highlights the permanent collections in various ways, including small spaces for short-term print and photography shows, a video gallery, and long-term installations organized both chronologically and thematically. Included on the grounds are outdoor sculptures and a rose garden. An external reflecting pool is surrounded on all sides by the museum.

The architecture of the original museum wing was designed in a combination of Art Nouveau and Art Deco styles by Eliel Saarinen in 1945 and completed in 1948.

The second addition, originally intended for large-scale sculpture, was designed in a Modernist style by I.M. Pei in 1966 and completed in 1968. Legend says that Pei designed the south windows, which look out onto the rose garden, to resemble "PEI", but he has denied this.

The third wing was designed by Richard Meier and completed in 1985. This wing was designed to allow as much natural ambient light in as possible.

The Art Center also includes a restaurant and a gift shop. Workshops, film festivals and lectures are conducted on a regular basis through the museums large studio program, with classes available for students of all ages.
