= The Lost Planet (Des Moines) =

Coordinates: 41°34′31″N 93°39′11″W

The Lost Planet, in Des Moines, Iowa was the former dumping site for lime filtered out of the water supply by the Des Moines Water Works. It is located in the middle of Waterworks Park in central Des Moines, across the river west of the Des Moines Water Works treatment plant and east of Valley Park Stables which is located at 2901 Seniomsed Avenue and to get there you follow 31st Street south from Grand Avenue as far as you can, then look for the street that crosses the train tracks and turns into gravel. Go all the way to the end of it to Lost Planet. ( During dry stints, the surface of the site would become cracked and take on an other-worldly look, hence the name. It is primarily a location where neighbors walk their dogs, students from Des Moines high schools visit, and birders watch shorebirds and ducks.

== Notable events ==
In the mid-1990s, Kelderman Agricultural Lime contracted with the Des Moines Water Works to haul away filtered lime to be dried and resold to farmers as agricultural fertilizer, and The Lost Planet was no longer used for dumping. As of 2013, the old lime has become overgrown by weeds, and the area no longer has the distinctive look that earned it the name Lost Planet.

The lime that was previously dumped here is now taken to a facility located at 3400 East Granger Avenue in Des Moines, south of the Iowa State Fairgrounds.
