= Des Moines Symphony =

Symphony orchestra in Des Moines, Iowa

- Orchestra
- Founded: 1937
- Concert hall: Civic Center of Greater Des Moines
- Principal conductor: Joseph Giunta
- Website: dmsymphony.org

The Des Moines Symphony (DMSO) is a United States symphony orchestra based in Des Moines, Iowa. The current conductor is Joseph Giunta. Established in 1937 as the Des Moines Civic Orchestra, it performs both Masterworks and Pops concerts as well as Iowa's largest single-day concert event, Yankee Doodle Pops. The orchestra principally performs at the Civic Center of Greater Des Moines in downtown Des Moines.

== History ==
The symphony was founded as the Des Moines Civic Orchestra. After a decade of efforts to form a permanent group, it performed its first concert at Hoyt Sherman Place on November 21, 1937, as a joint effort between community and Drake University musicians. Drake professor Frank Noyes was the conductor, beginning a 30-season tenure as conductor.

For 1938, it moved to Theodore Roosevelt High School and stayed there until 1948, when it moved to the KRNT Theater in downtown Des Moines. In 1954, concerts returned to Hoyt Sherman for three years before moving to North High School in 1957. Noyes retired in 1967, succeeded by a series of conductors who each conducted for two or three years before Yuri Krasnapolsky assumed the position in 1974. For the 1967–68 season, the classical season was expanded from four to five performances. In 1969, plans were made to dissolve official ties with Drake University, which happened by 1974.

Krasnapolsky oversaw the doubling of the classical season, from five concerts to six concert pairs, for the 1977–78 season. He also oversaw the transition to the Civic Center of Greater Des Moines in 1979, the symphony's home ever since. The classical season was expanded again for the 1982–83 season to its current seven concert pairs.

Joseph Giunta assumed the role of conductor and musical director in 1989. Under Giunta, the orchestra has established an outstanding national reputation as one of the country's leading regional orchestras, performing a regular series of Masterworks, Pops, Family and Education Concerts, as well as performing for special events. With the establishment in 2003 of the Des Moines Symphony Academy, it is one of only a handful of American orchestras to sponsor an academy of music as an integral part of its core mission, and the symphony and academy together are now the largest employer of professional artists in Iowa. The academy had 410 students enrolled in 2012.

All of the Masterworks programs are broadcast statewide on Iowa Public Radio.
