= Civic Center of Greater Des Moines =

Performing arts center in Iowa, U.S.

Des Moines Civic Center
- Civic Center in 2006
- Interactive map of Des Moines Civic Center
- Address: 221 Walnut Street; Des Moines, Iowa, United States
- Coordinates: 41.587424°N 93.620409°W
- Owner: Des Moines Performing Arts
- Operator: Des Moines Performing Arts
- Capacity: 2,744 People
- Type: Performing arts center
- Public transit: DART

Construction
- Opened: June 10, 1979
- Architects: Charles Hebert & Associates
- General contractor: The Weitz Company

Website
- www.desmoinesperformingarts.org

The Des Moines Civic Center is a 2,744-seat performing arts center owned and operated by Des Moines Performing Arts located in Des Moines, Iowa, United States. It has been Iowa's largest theater since it opened on June 10, 1979, and is used for concerts, Broadway shows, ballets, and other special events. The Civic Center building is also home to the 200-seat Stoner Theater, used for smaller theatrical shows and lectures, located on street level. Together with the Stoner Theater, Cowles Commons, and the nearby Temple for Performing Arts, the Civic Center is part of the Des Moines Performing Arts.

== History ==
Prior to the construction of the Des Moines Civic Center, KRNT Theater, named for local radio station KRNT, was the main cultural venue. It unexpectedly closed in 1972. Its closure caused many touring productions, including musicals, bands, and artists, to skip Des Moines.

Attempts to pass a referendum to open a new publicly-owned civic center in 1974 failed. In spite of this, a new not-for-profit corporation was formed to build the civic auditorium anyway. The city's largest fundraising effort at the time raised $9.3 million to build the Civic Center in fewer than 90 days.

The Des Moines Civic Center was built on a lot donated by the city of Des Moines, but was built with private funding. Construction began in 1977. The civic center officially opened on June 10, 1979. Its first performance was by the Des Moines Ballet on June 14.

The organization operating the Civic Center was originally known as the Civic Center of Greater Des Moines. In 2002, it took on management of the Temple Theater, located within the Temple for Performing Arts building at 1011 Locust Street — a 1913 Masonic structure that had undergone major restoration after being threatened with demolition. In 2013 the organization was renamed Des Moines Performing Arts.

The stage is 28 feet (8.5 m) high and 78 feet (24 m) wide. Backstage there are ten dressing rooms. The theater has two lobbies, each of which has a ceiling height of 50 feet (15 m), skylights, glass walls, and skywalks connecting the theater with most of downtown Des Moines.

The adjacent outdoor plaza, Cowles Commons (formerly Nollen Plaza), contains public art including the sculpture Crusoe Umbrella by Claes Oldenburg and the lighting installation Swirl by Jim Campbell.

=== Notable programs ===
In August 1995, the Civic Center hosted the launch of the pre-Broadway national tour of State Fair, the stage adaptation of the Rodgers and Hammerstein 1945 film. The tour opened on August 12, 1995, timed to coincide with the Iowa State Fair. The production traveled to more than 23 cities before opening on Broadway at the Music Box Theatre on March 27, 1996.

The Iowa High School Musical Theater Awards (IHSMTA) launched at the Civic Center in the 2012-13 school year with 9 schools. In 2024 the program recognized more than 100 schools across Iowa.

In November 2015, the Civic Center hosted the launch of the national tour of The Bridges of Madison County. The production's Iowa opening reflected its setting in Madison County, Iowa.

== Leadership ==
Jeff Chelesvig served as president and chief executive officer from January 1995 until his retirement in November 2025. Monica Holt became president and chief executive officer in January 2026.
