= Gray's Lake Park =

Park in Des Moines, Iowa

Coordinates: 41°34′20.1144″N 93°38′37.6296″W

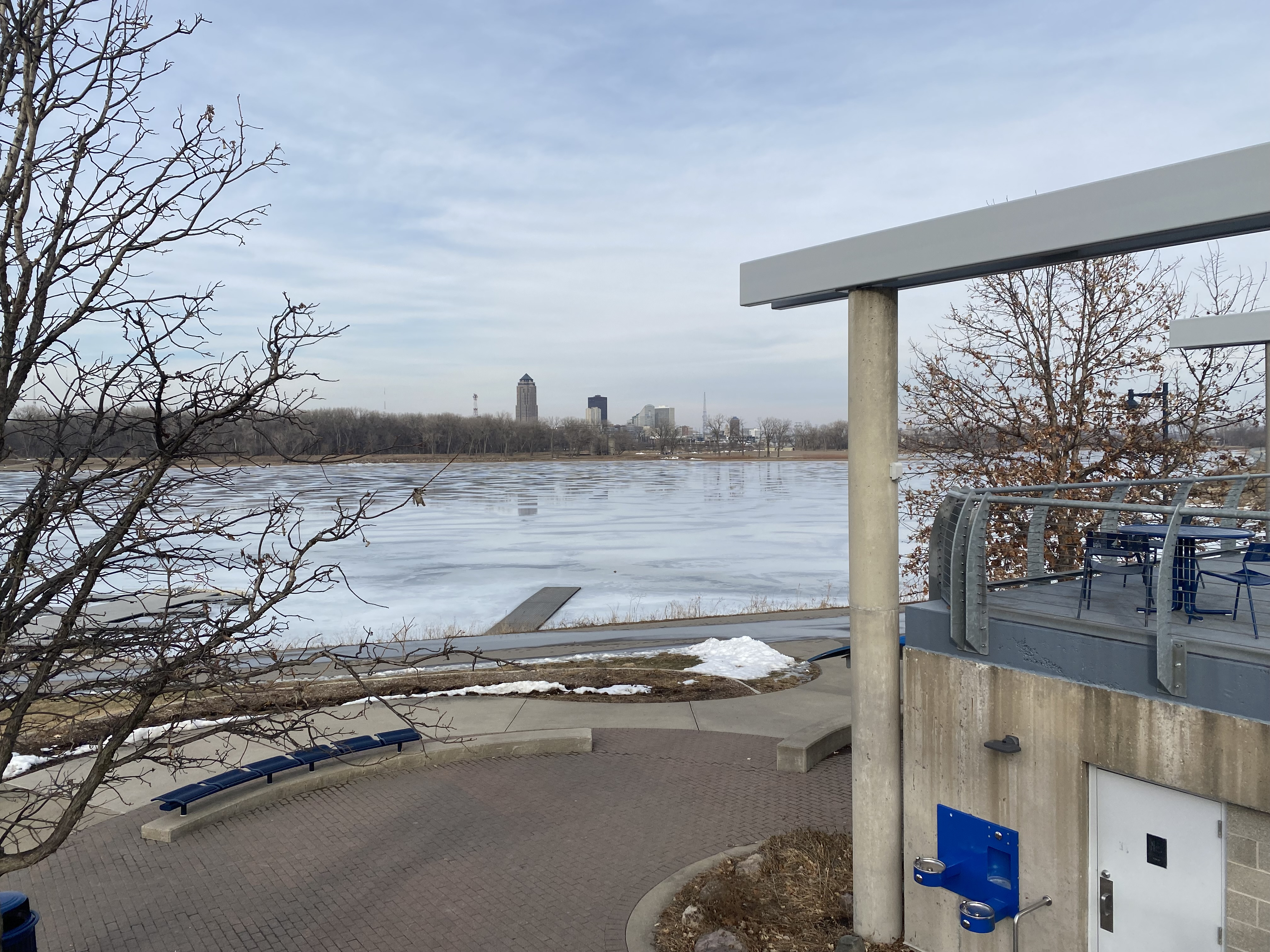
- Interactive map of Gray's Lake Park
- Type: large city park
- Location: 2101 Fleur Dr, Des Moines, IA
- Coordinates: https://www.alltopsights.com/attraction-gray-s-lake-park-iowa-ia/
- Area: 166.6 acres (67.4 ha)
- Established: 1970
- Website: https://www.dsm.city/business_detail_T6_R58.php

Gray's Lake Park is a park containing Gray's Lake in Des Moines, Iowa and covers 166.6 acres. Located just southwest of downtown at 2101 Fleur Dr, Des Moines, IA. With over 1 million people visiting the park each year, it is the city's most known and most visited recreation area. The park has a trail encompassing the lake that is 1.9 miles long and a pedestrian bridge over part of the lake. The park is linked with the system of trails that travel throughout the city and nearby Water Works Park.

The lake spans 96.00 acres and is 16.4 ft at its deepest point. Gray's Lakes’ popular fish are Black Crappie, Bluegill, Channel Catfish, Common Carp, Freshwater Drum, Largemouth Bass, River Carpsucker, White Crappie, Wiper, and Yellow Bass.

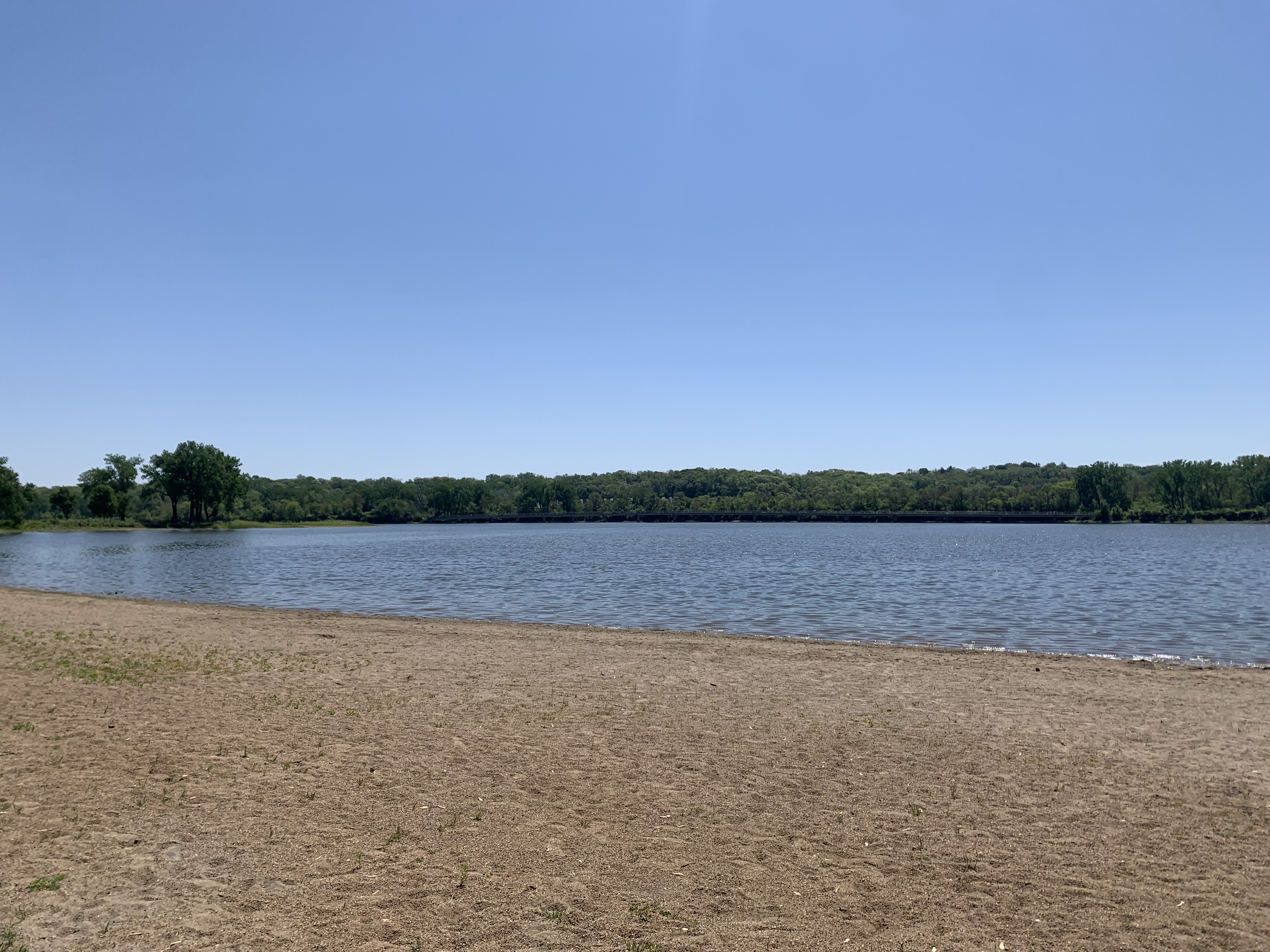
Gray's Lake beach

The Kruidenier Trail pedestrian bridge that crosses the lake was designed by Cal Lewis. The bridge is 1,400 feet long, 16 feet wide and goes over the lake connecting two parts of the path around the lake. Lights on both sides of the bridge illuminate the path of the bridge at night with many colors.

The park contains a sandy beach on the west side of the lake, a swing set, a boat rental stand, and two entrances to the park with their respective parking lots and restrooms.

== History ==
Gray’s Lake was formed as an oxbow lake of the Raccoon River. In the 1950s the size of the lake was increased to almost 100 acres by a rock and sand quarry operation. After residents advocated for the creation of a park for the lake, the area near the lake was purchased by the city and developed the land into Gray’s Lake Park in 1970. After the flood of 1993 damaged the area, a large donation by David and Elizabeth Kruidenier (a local couple) along with other donations were gifted for renovations of the park that brought it to its current appearance. This inspired hundreds of millions of dollars of development in downtown Des Moines. The Kruidenier Trail pedestrian bridge was built in 2000.
