= Brown's Woods =

Urban forest and wildlife preserve in Des Moines, Iowa

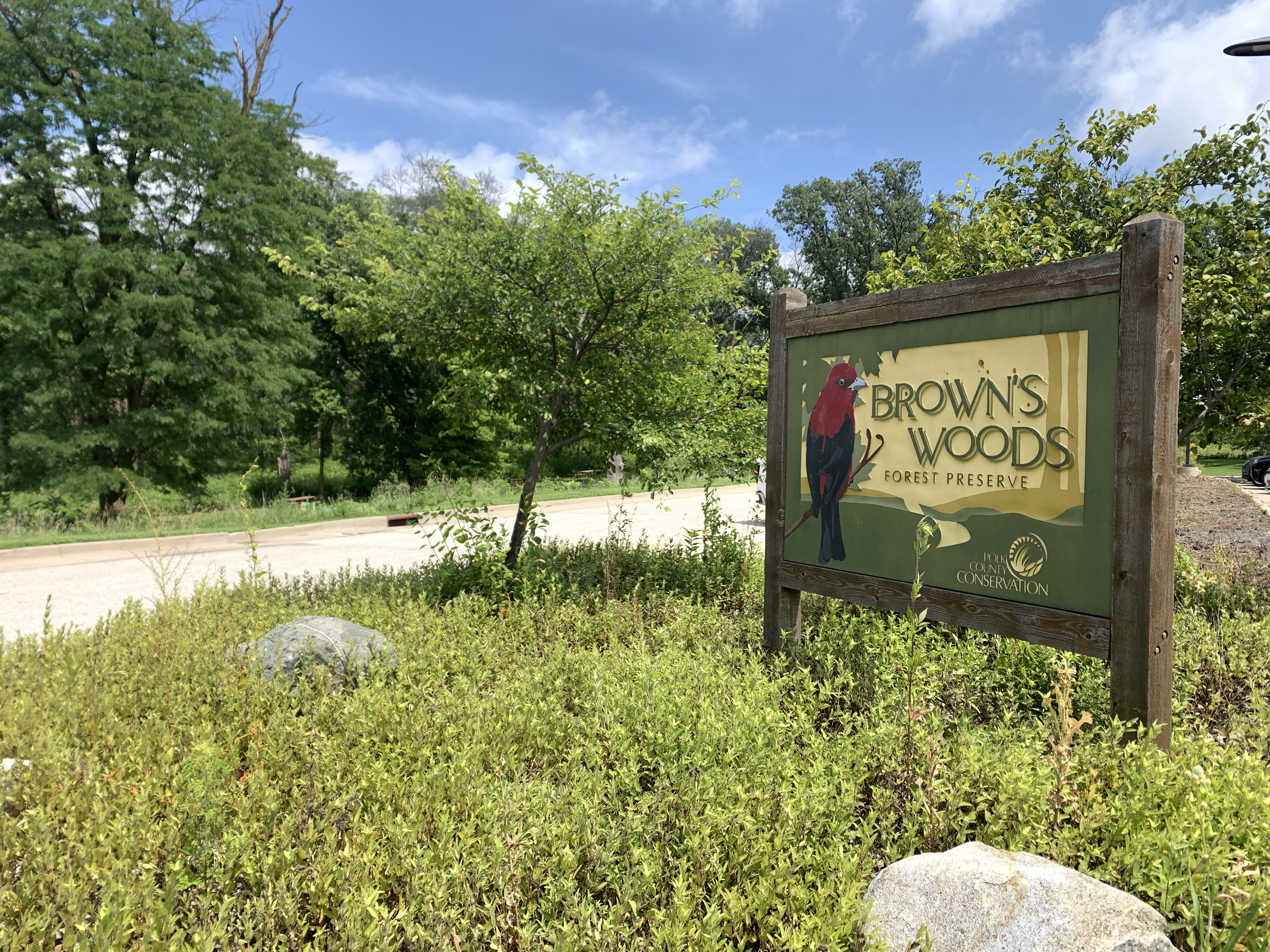
- Interactive map of Brown's Woods
- Type: Wildlife Preserve
- Location: Des Moines, Iowa
- Coordinates: 41.541210°N 93.708390°W
- Area: 486 acres (1.97 km^{2})
- Established: 1972
- Hiking trails: Brown's Woods Tail

Brown's Woods is a wildlife preserve in Des Moines, Iowa and is Iowa's largest urban forest. There are 4.4 miles (5km) of hiking trails in Brown's Woods with a total elevation gain of 213ft (64.92m). Around 70,000 people visit Brown's Woods every year. Brown's Woods provides an essential stopping place for spring and fall migratory birds, such as warblers and vireos. Showy orchids are listed as endangered species and can be found in Brown's Woods. 100–200 feet (30–61 m) of bluffs are found at the western boundary where Raccoon River is.

The wildlife area is named after Tallmadge E. Brown, a Des Moines lawyer who acquired large tracts of land around Des Moines in the late 1800s. One of them was this forest acquired by the Conservation Board in 1972.

Park Hours
Summer	6:30am - 10:30pm	April 1 - October 31
Winter	Sunrise - Sunset	November 1 - March 31
