= Walnut Woods State Park =

State park in Polk County, Iowa

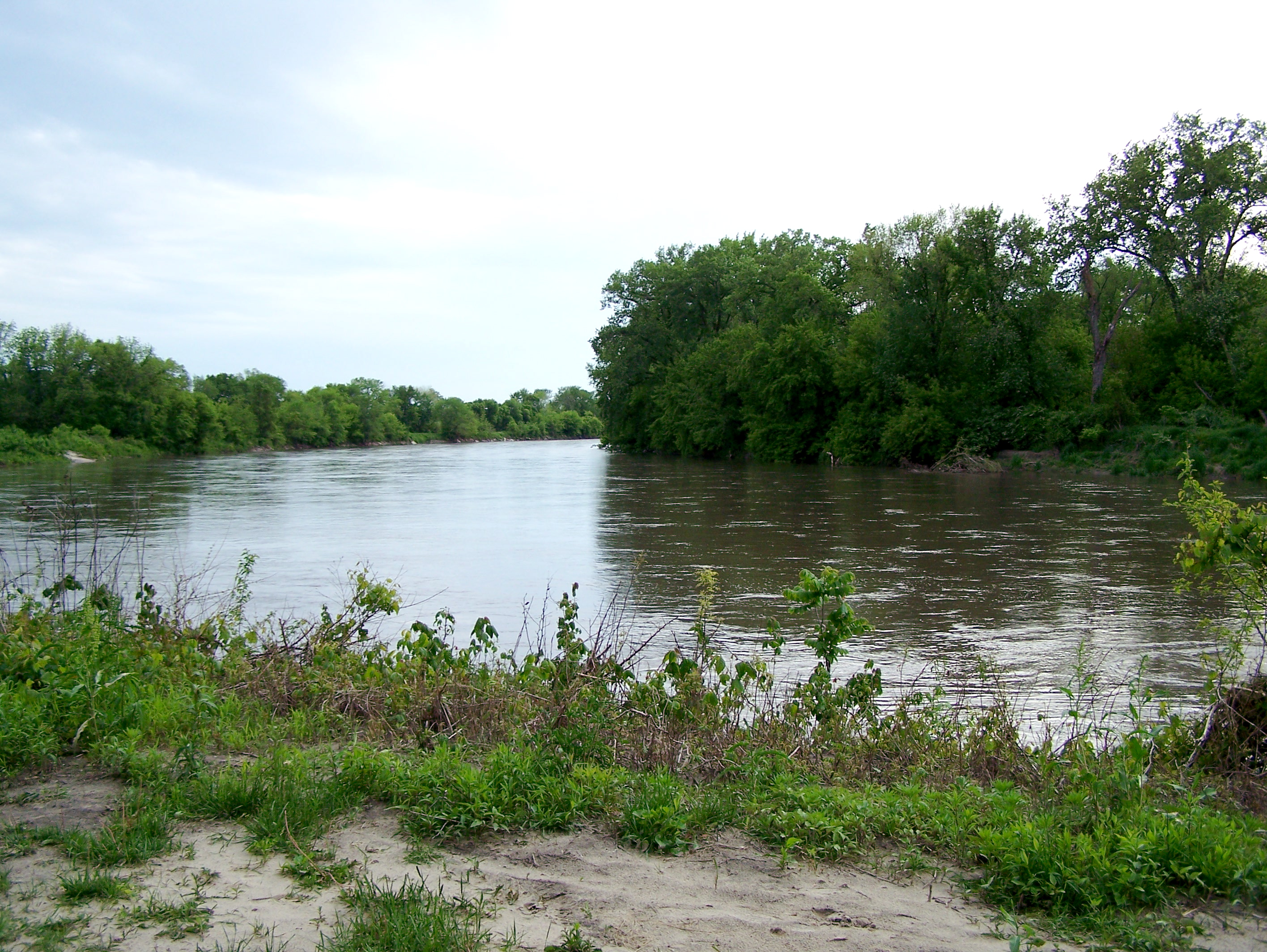
- The Raccoon River on the park's northern border

- Location within Iowa Location within the United States
- Location: Polk County, Iowa, United States
- Coordinates: 41°32′31″N 93°44′34″W
- Area: 250 acres (100 ha)
- Elevation: 820 ft (250 m)
- Administrator: Iowa Department of Natural Resources
- Website: Official website

Walnut Woods State Park is a state park in Polk County, Iowa, United States, located in suburban West Des Moines. Within the Des Moines metropolitan area, the park preserves a bottomland hardwood forest featuring the largest natural stand of black walnut trees in North America. The Raccoon River meanders through the 250-acre (100 ha) park, providing fishing and canoeing opportunities. The park also provides picnic areas, a limestone lodge built in the 1930s, and a small campground with 22 sites. More than 90 bird species have been seen in the park.
