= Masonic Temple of Des Moines =

- U.S. National Register of Historic Places
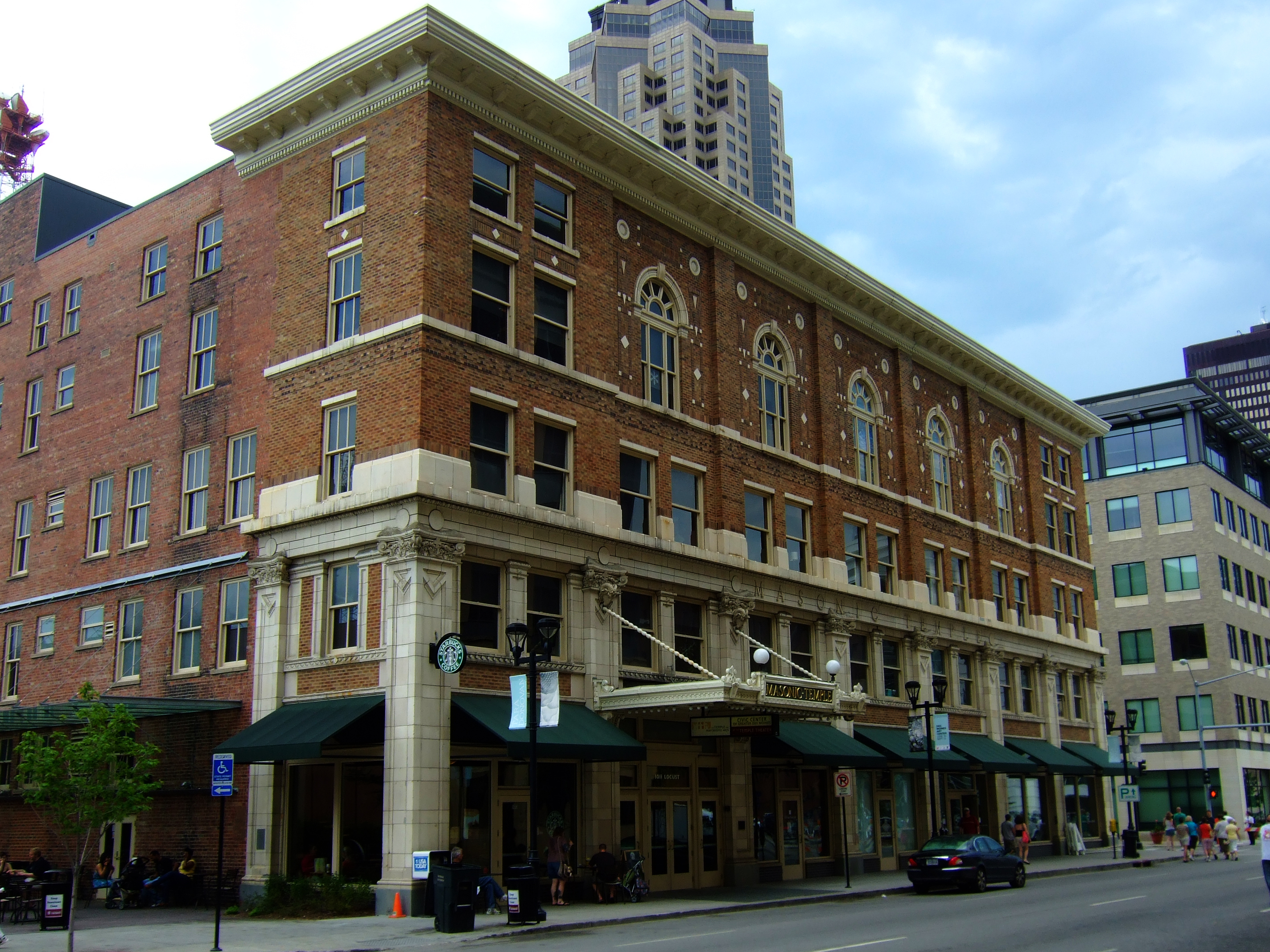
- The Masonic Temple (1913) at 1011 Locust Street in Des Moines, Iowa.

- Location within Iowa Location within the United States
- Location: 1011 Locust St., Des Moines, Iowa
- Coordinates: 41°35′9.4″N 93°37′49.1″W
- Area: less than one acre
- Built: 1913
- Architect: Proudfoot Bird & Rawson
- Architectural style: Late 19th and 20th Century Revivals, Beaux Arts
- MPS: Architectural Legacy of Proudfoot & Bird in Iowa MPS
- NRHP reference No.: 97000961
- Added to NRHP: August 29, 1997

The Masonic Temple of Des Moines is a historic Beaux Arts style building located in Des Moines, Iowa. Constructed in 1913, it was listed on the National Register of Historic Places (NRHP) in 1997 (under the name "Masonic Temple of Des Moines").

It was designed by the Des Moines-based architectural firm Proudfoot, Bird & Rawson. The building was listed on the NRHP for its architecture, as part of a 1988 multiple property submission. It was then one of 25 known surviving Proudfoot, Bird & Rawson buildings in Des Moines and is one of two known lodge buildings designed by the firm.

As originally constructed, the building consisted of retail and office spaces on the first three floors, with Masonic meeting rooms on the fourth floor. In 2001 the Masons vacated their rooms on the fourth floor, which were converted into a venue for performing arts, culture entertainment and learning, billed as the Temple for Performing Arts.
