= Raccoon River =

River in Iowa, U.S.

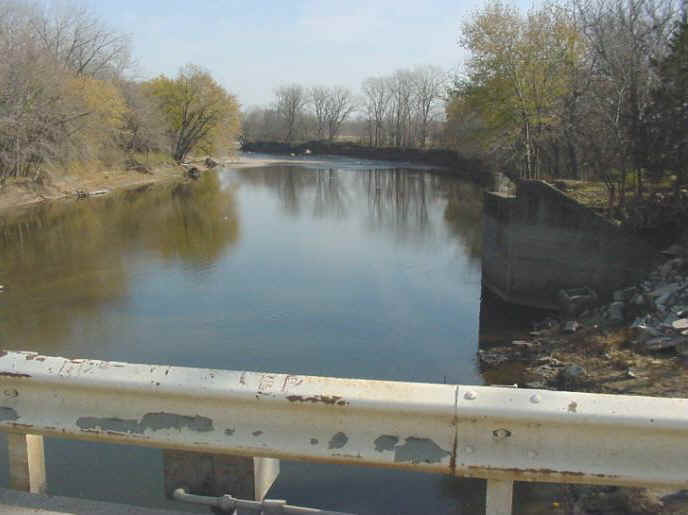
- The Raccoon River at Van Meter

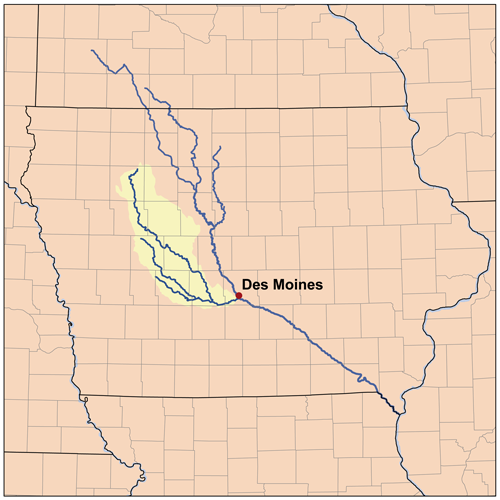
- Map of the Raccoon River watershed

Location
- Country: US
- State: Iowa
- District: Polk County, Iowa, Dallas County, Iowa

Physical characteristics
- Source
  - coordinates: 41°32′38″N 93°58′00″W
  - elevation: 850 ft (260 m)
- Mouth: Des Moines River
  - location: Des Moines, Iowa
  - coordinates: 41°34′46″N 93°36′44″W
  - elevation: 784 ft (239 m)
- Discharge
  - location: Fleur Drive, Des Moines, Iowa
  - average: 2,721 cu/ft. per sec.

Basin features
- Tributaries
  - left: South Raccoon River
  - right: North Raccoon River

The Raccoon River is a 30.8-mile-long (49.6 km) tributary of the Des Moines River in central Iowa in the United States. As measured using the longest of its three forks, its length increases to 226 miles (364 km). Via the Des Moines River, it is part of the watershed of the Mississippi River. The river runs through an intensely cultivated area of croplands and livestock farming, receiving Tile drainage from slow-draining rich natural bottomland.

The Des Moines metropolitan area has been obtaining its drinking water from the Raccoon River just before it empties into the Des Moines River through water utilities since the 19th century. During the Great Flood of 1993, the Raccoon River flooded the water treatment facility of Des Moines, shutting off the city's supply of drinking water.

== History ==
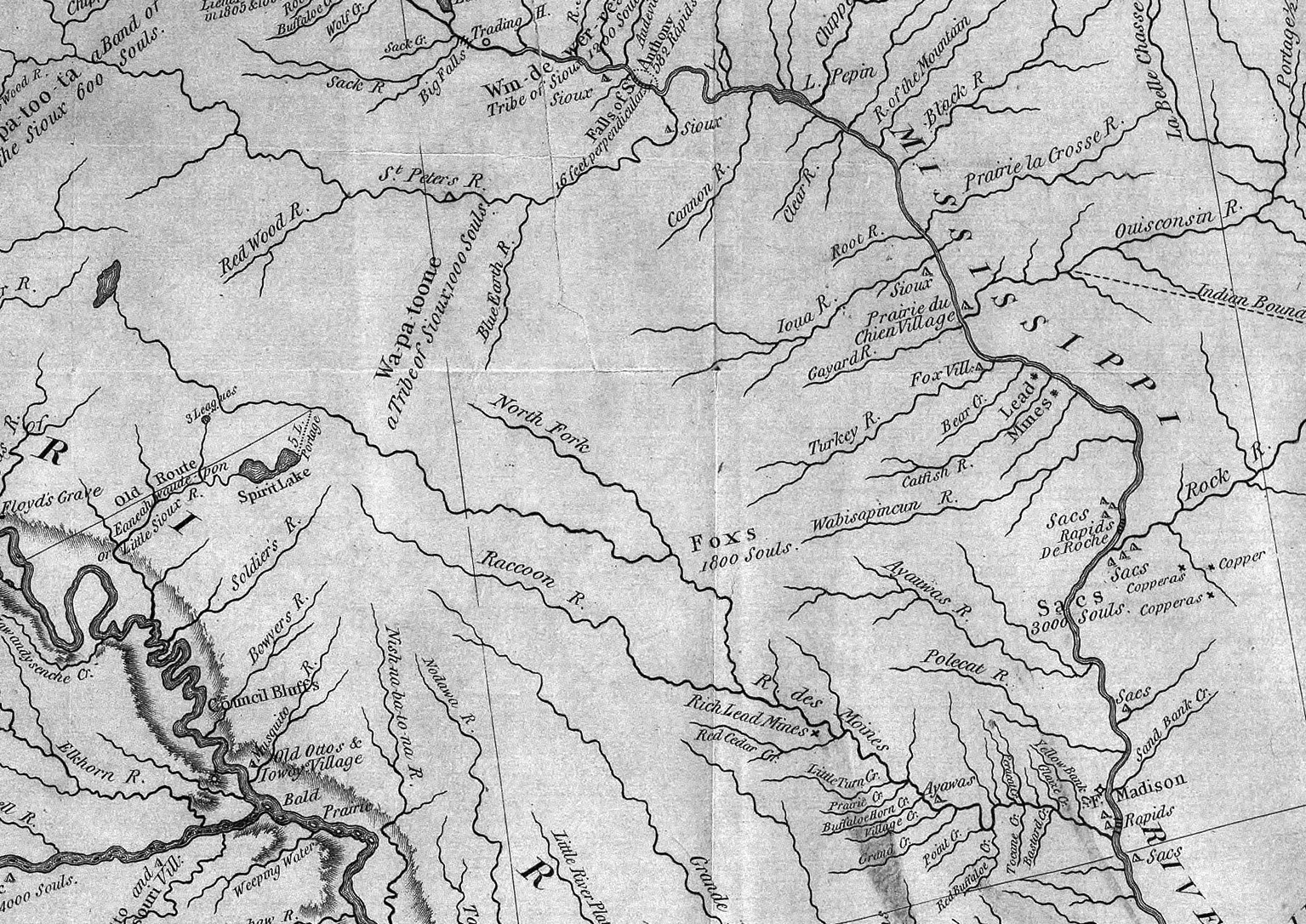
Excerpt of the Racoon River on the Map of Lewis and Clark's Track, Across the Western Portion of North America, 1814

The Racoon River was first documented on the 1814 map by Lewis and Clark, though the USGS references the name to a later map from 1843 named Hydrological Basin of the Upper Mississippi River based on field measurements by Joseph N. Nicollet during his Midwestern expeditions in the 1830s.

== Course ==
The Raccoon River is a 30.8-mile-long (49.6 km) tributary of the Des Moines River in central Iowa in the United States. It flows for much of its length as three streams and when measured using the longest of its three forks, its length increases to 226 miles (364 km).

The river runs through an intensely cultivated area of croplands mostly of corn and soy and livestock farming, where slow-draining rich natural bottomlands have been tiled to drain them for agricultural cultivation.

- The North Raccoon River is, by far, the longest of the three, at 196 miles (315 km). It rises north of Marathon in northeastern Buena Vista County and initially flows southwardly into Sac County, where it turns southeastward for the remainder of its course through Calhoun, Carroll, Greene and Dallas counties. It passes the towns of Sac City, Jefferson, Perry and Adel. The Adel Island dam in Adel is the only dam along its course.
- The Middle Raccoon River, 92 miles (148 km) long, rises in northwestern Carroll County and flows generally southeastwardly through Guthrie and Dallas counties, past Carroll, Coon Rapids, Springbrook State Park, Panora, Linden, and Redfield. The three dams located along its course are the Lake Panorama dam and the Lennon Mill dam at Panora, and the Redfield dam at Redfield. Even though the Lake Panorama dam, completed in 1970, was built for recreational purposes only, it has provided some additional benefits by controlling flooding along the Middle Raccoon River. The Middle Raccoon River flows into the South Raccoon River about 1 mile (1.6 km) south of Redfield.
- The South Raccoon River, about 72 miles (116 km) long, rises in northeastern Audubon County and flows generally southeastwardly through Guthrie and Dallas counties, past the town of Guthrie Center. South of Redfield, after the Middle Raccoon River flows into the South Raccoon River, a flow gauge operated jointly by the United States Army Corps of Engineers (Rock Island District), the United States Geological Survey (Iowa District), and the Iowa Department of Transportation provides data about potential flooding threats.

The north and south forks join in Dallas County just west of Van Meter, and the Raccoon River flows generally eastward into Polk County, past Walnut Woods State Park and West Des Moines. It joins the Des Moines River just south of downtown Des Moines and is part of the watershed of the Mississippi River.

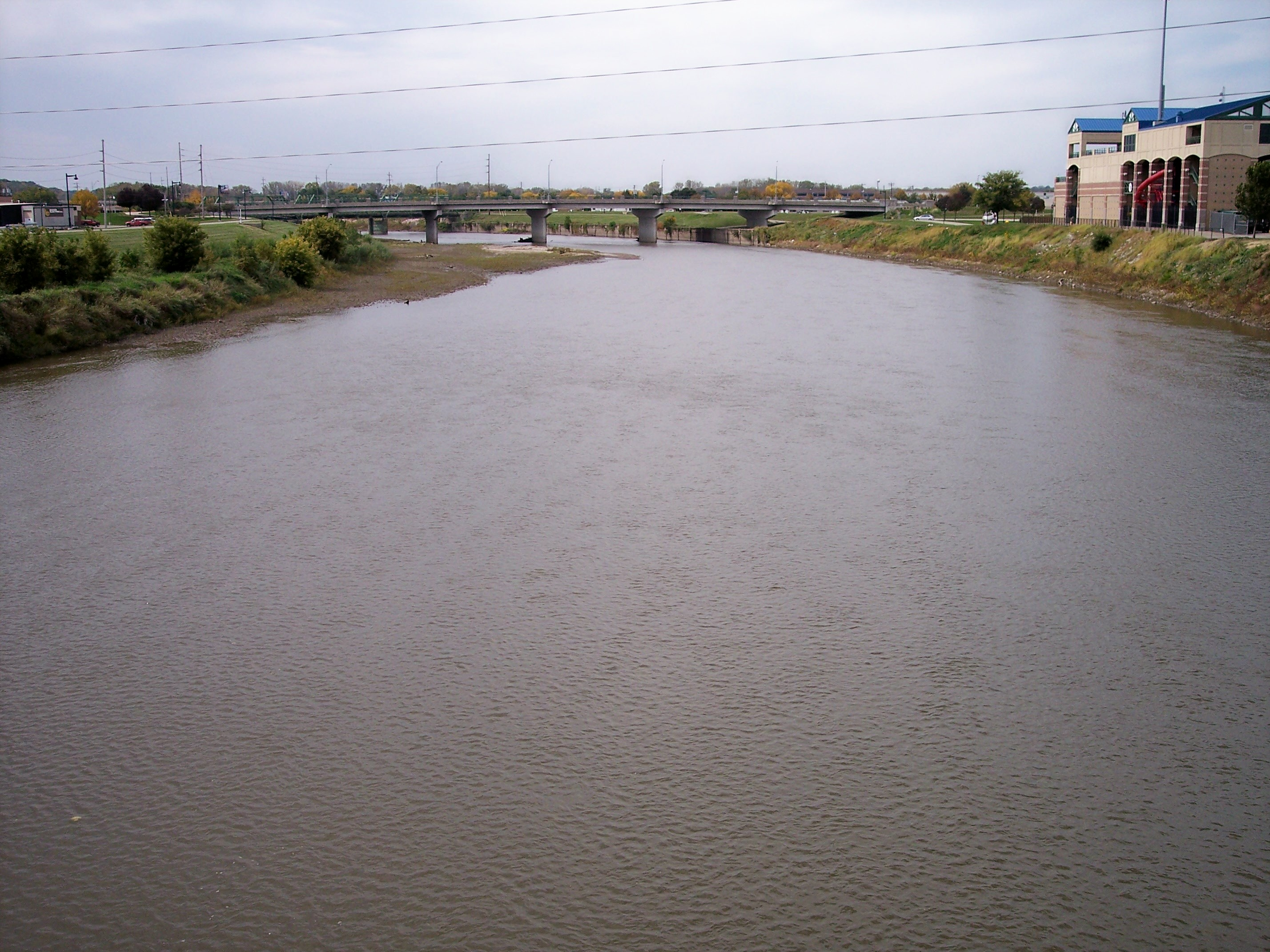
Raccoon River viewed upstream from its mouth in Des Moines. Principal Park is at right.

== Drinking water use ==
Both the Raccoon and Des Moines rivers have been providing drinking water for the Des Moines metropolitan area through water utilities since the 19th century. During the Great Flood of 1993, the Raccoon River flooded the water treatment facility of Des Moines, shutting off the city's drinking water supply.

=== Agricultural pollution ===
Spring thaws, as in the spring of 2013, and rainy spells after drought wash nitrate from fertilizer into the river. On November 20, 2014, nitrates spiked at 13.7 parts per million (ppm), making the water unsafe for pregnant women and infants. (The US Environmental Protection Agency requires officials to inform the public about safety risks at 10 ppm.) At the time, these were the highest readings in the nation.

== See also ==
- List of Iowa rivers

== Sources ==
- Columbia Gazetteer of North America entry
- DeLorme (1998). Iowa Atlas & Gazetteer. Yarmouth, Maine: DeLorme. ISBN 0-89933-214-5.
- GNIS entries for U.S. Geological Survey Geographic Names Information System: Raccoon River, U.S. Geological Survey Geographic Names Information System: Middle Raccoon River, U.S. Geological Survey Geographic Names Information System: North Raccoon River, U.S. Geological Survey Geographic Names Information System: South Raccoon River
