= 1996 in radio =

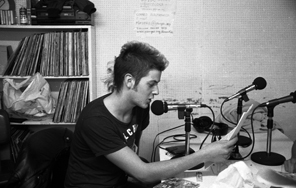
Radiobronka1996

The year 1996 in radio involved some significant events.

== Events ==
- President Clinton signed the Telecommunications Act of 1996, which greatly increased the number of stations one could own per market, into law.
- Geneseo, Illinois radio stations WGEN (1500 AM) and WGEN-FM (104.9) are sold to Connoisseur Communications, owner of KJOC, KQCS, WXLP and KBOB with studios in Davenport, Iowa. The FM signal is simply a repeater of KJOC's signal, which has an all-sports format, while the AM signal repeats KBOB (at the time, located at 99.7 FM with a country format) as Connoisseur was considering future plans for the two stations.
- January 5 - WXRK/New York flips from classic rock to a hybrid modern rock/active rock format, while keeping the "K-Rock" moniker.
- January 20 - WPAT-FM Paterson, NJ/New York City ends its Adult Contemporary format of over 3 years and shuts down the entire intellectual unit on 93.1 FM, located in Clifton, NJ at 12:01 a.m. The frequency and transmitter only were sold by Park Communications to Spanish Broadcasting System who at the next moment sign on the station with the same call letters from Manhattan with a Spanish AC format. WPAT FM had been a Beautiful Music Station for decades and evolved to AC at the end of 1992. AM 930 WPAT remains AC for a couple more months as they are also sold but to another Spanish broadcast group Heftel.
- February - Jacor announced it would purchase Citicasters, Inc. and Noble Broadcast Group. In addition, SFX Broadcasting announced it would buy Prism Radio Partners.
- February 5–10 – After 7 and a half years (in the country format (Over a year on 97.1 FM, the remaining time on 103.5), WYNY/New York drops the format at 6 AM and began to simulcast its sister stations outside New York, WRCX in Chicago on February 5, KKBT in Los Angeles on February 6, WLUP-FM in Chicago on February 7, KIOI in San Francisco on February 8, and WXKS-FM in Boston on February 9. On February 10, WYNY would flip to a Dance CHR format as "103.5 The New KTU."
- February 15 - Top 40-formatted WYHY/Nashville drops the format after 14 years and flips to Hot AC as WRVW, "The River."
- March - Infinity Broadcasting buys out Granum Communications' group of 12 stations for $410 million, while Clear Channel Communications would buy U.S. Radio's 18 station group for $140 million.
- March 8 – KZZP in Phoenix flips back to Top 40/CHR
- March 25 - KCIN/Seattle flips from country to Rhythmic AC, branded as "Kiss 106", after a week of simulcasting sister stations and a stunt loop of various sound effects
- March 26 - WPAT-FM's sale from Park to SBS is final though SBS had custody of the frequency since January 20. WPAT AM 930 though is sold to Heftel on March 26 and at 3 p.m. the AC format (by then was more of a Soft AC since splitting from the FM) ends and a Spanish pop format begins. WPAT AM 93 evolves to a brokered format later in the year. The building and real estate is included in the sale of the AM but not the FM.
- April - SFX Broadcasting and Multi-Market Radio announced plans to merge.
- April 1 - WHTZ/New York City quietly segues from CHR/Modern Rock to a pop-slanted Modern Rock format, eliminating the non-rock hits heard on CHR stations. The station will have a Modern AC lean by May.
- April 19 - On-air talent Paul 'Cubby' Bryant exits Houston’s 104.1 KRBE and joins New York City’s WHTZ’s restructured top 40/CHR format.
- May - Former SFX President/CEO Steve Hicks and brother Tom Hicks of Hicks, Muse, Tate & Furst launched Capstar Broadcasting, with plans to spend $1 billion on middle-market radio stations. Also that month, Cox Radio would acquire NewCity Communications for $250 million.
- May 31 - WEDJ/Charlotte rebrands to "Kiss 95.1", bringing the "Kiss" moniker back to the market for the first time in 2 years, when it was formerly carried on 101.9 FM (now WBAV-FM)
- June 20 - Westinghouse/CBS Radio announced its merger with Infinity Broadcasting. The $3.9 billion deal would be the biggest deal in radio history until Clear Channel's acquisition of AMFM in October 1999.
- July - Capstar would buy Osborn Communications for $100 million; also that month, Heftel Broadcasting and Tichenor Media would merge, becoming one of the first major Spanish-language radio companies.
- July 1 - WAXQ/New York City is sold from Entercom to Viacom and the format changes from Active Rock to a pop-based classic rock format.
- July–November - WHTZ/New York gradually segues from pop-slanted Modern Rock to mainstream CHR, with the shift completed in November.
- July 29 – WWWE in Cleveland, Ohio (long nicknamed "3WE") reverts to their original WTAM call letters, now branded as "WTAM 1100."
- August - American Radio Systems announced it would acquire EZ Communications' nearly 100 station group for $655 million. Also that month, Chancellor Broadcasting would acquire Colfax Communications' 12 station group for $365 million.
- August 9 - Adult Contemporary-formatted WLTI/Detroit reverted to the WDRQ call letters and branding, and flipped to Rhythmic AC.
- August 15 – Adult Contemporary-formatted KHHT/Denver (now KQKS) flips to Top 40 as "K-HITS 107.5"
- October – Radio4all.net is founded.
- October 30 – KPTY debuts as Arizona's Party Station after stunting with various genres of music
- November 14 – After a day of stunting with showtunes, WMXV/New York flips from Hot AC to Modern AC as "105.1 The Buzz" WDBZ.
- November 18 – Radio Disney begins broadcasting.
- December - 102.7 WNEW-FM evolves from Adult Rock to classic rock
- WBOB and KQQL, both in Minneapolis, Minnesota are sold to Chancellor Communications.
- The United Auto Workers invest in United Broadcasting Network, which later became I.E. America Radio Network. UAW's president at the time, Stephen Yokich, saw UBN as a way to promote the union's ideals and counter conservative radio talk show hosts.
- KILT in Houston, Texas flips to sports.
- River City FM is sold to The Radio Network.

== Debuts ==
- Doug Banks begins national syndication of morning radio show
- Los Angeles radio listeners picked up two new stations, Rhythmic Adult Contemporary KIBB ("B100.3") and Dance-intensive KACD/KBCD ("Groove Radio 103.1"). Both would last only 2 years.
- KHTS-FM ("Channel 93.3")/San Diego debuts with a Dance Top 40 format on Labor Day. They would evolve to Mainstream Top 40 in August 1998.
- Phantom FM begins broadcasting as a pirate station.
- Kol Chai begins broadcasting in Israel.
- DWWW 774 begins broadcasting in the Philippines.
- Radio Romance renamed WRR 101.9.

== New radio shows ==
- April – Alan Parker, Road Warrior (BBC Radio 1)
- July – Comedy Quiz (BBC Radio 4)
- November
  - Beaumarchais (BBC Radio 4)
  - hardDrive (United Stations Radio Networks)
  - Tonight with Vincent Browne (RTÉ Radio)

== Deaths ==
- March 9 – George Burns, American comedian, award-winning actor and best-selling writer (born 1896)
- March 26 – John Snagge, British newsreader and commentator (born 1904)
- April 29 – David Davis, English children's radio broadcaster (born 1908)
- July 5 – Anne Hummert, American creator of daytime radio serials during the 1930s and 1940s (born 1905)
- August 7 – Bill Hanrahan, American radio and television announcer (born 1918)
- September 11 – Louise Fitch, American actress
- October 28 – Morey Amsterdam, veteran American television and radio actor and comedian (born 1908)
- November 13 – Alma Kitchell, began on radio as a singer, later became host of a number of programs on WJZ and NBC radio
- December 11 – Willie Rushton, English comedian, actor, radio and television personality and cartoonist (born 1937)
- December 14 – Norman Hackforth, British musical accompanist and radio "mystery voice" (born 1908)

== See also ==
- Radio broadcasting
