= 2000 in radio =

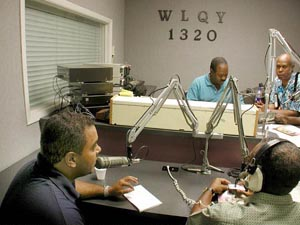
Miami-Dade, FL, October 7, 2000 -- FEMA Federal Coordinating Officer, Justo Hernandez (far left), participates on a call-in radio talk show with WLQY producer Andre Edner. Joseph [center] at the controls.

The year 2000 in radio involved some significant events.

== Events ==
- The Real Radio & Century Radio networks become active on – air, through the United Kingdom.
- The Quad-Cities' signal for 1580 AM, last holding the call letters KFQC, goes silent for the last time. To date, there has been no announcement when, or if, a station will be returning to the frequency, which had been in use since 1952.
- January - Country-formatted KFMS/Las Vegas flips to Top 40/CHR, "Kiss FM"
- January 14 - WQSH/Louisville shifts from Modern AC to Hot AC
- January 27 - The City 97.9/Oklahoma City flipped from Smooth jazz to Rhythmic CHR, branded as "Wild 97dot9."
- March - Connoisseur Communications, owners of Quad Cities radio stations KJOC, KORB, WXLP, KQLI and KBOB, are sold to Cumulus Media. At the same time, a series of format changes at two of the stations are unveiled. KBOB, with a country music format, is moved from 99.7 FM to 104.9 FM, replacing KQLI's light adult contemporary format. Replacing KBOB at 99.7 FM is a contemporary hit radio/Top 40 format, with the new call sign KBEA-FM.
- March - Clear Channel acquires SFX Broadcasting for $4.4 billion
- March - Classic Rock-formatted WNAP/Indianapolis flips to Top 40/CHR as WNOU, "Radio Now"
- March 10 - Country-formatted KYNG/Dallas-Fort Worth flips to hot talk as "105.3 The Talk That Rocks."
- March 17 - WFSJ Jacksonville debuts as Kiss 97.9
- June - Minnesota receives its first ever commercial Rhythmic Top 40 station when KARP-FM dropped its country format and moved into the Minneapolis/St. Paul market as KTTB, "B96."
- June 9 - Modern AC-formatted KBBT/Portland flips to All-80's Hits as KVMX, "Mix 107.5."
- June 30 - KKBT 100.3 and KCMG 92.3 swapped frequencies in Los Angeles, and in Washington DC, WPLC, after being sold, flips from Modern AC as "Pulse 94dot3" to Spanish AC as "Amor 94.3".
- July 18 - 94.5 The Buzz (Modern Rock) and Oldies 107.5 (Classic Hits) swapped frequencies in Houston. Chris McMurray makes the official announcement before the move to 107.5
- August 17 - Kansas City's longtime classical station KXTR 96.5 is moved to AM 1250 at 10 AM that day. A modern AC format that would later evolve to modern rock as "96.5 The Buzz" replaced classical at 96.5 two hours later. New calls of KRBZ arrived about a week later.
- August 18 - Hot AC-formatted KSTJ/Las Vegas flips to All-80s Hits
- August 24 - U102/Denver launched.
- August 25 - WHCY Sussex becomes Max 106.3
- August 30 - The merger of AMFM, Inc. and Clear Channel Communications officially closes.
- September - Smooth jazz-formatted KHIH/Denver flips to Top 40/CHR as KFMD, "Kiss FM."
- September 25 – KFYI 590 and KGME 910 swapped frequencies at midnight in Phoenix
- October - Active rock-formatted WXTM/St. Louis flips to All-80s Hits as WMLL, "The Mall."
- October 30 - WOCL/Orlando dropped its Rhythmic Oldies format and began stunting. Also on this day, Rock AC-formatted KMBX/Seattle flips to rhythmic oldies.
- October 31 - WOCL stops stunting at Noon, and launches its new modern rock format, branded as "O-Rock 105.9."
- November 3 - WSUN Oldies 97.1 becomes 97X: Tampa Bay's New Rock Alternative.
- November 4 - FM 106.3 WHTG becomes G 106.3
  - KKTL debuts as Hot 97.1
- November 6 - 96.5 The Point debuted in Philadelphia.
- December - Modern AC-formatted KKNB/Lincoln flips to Top 40/CHR as KSLI-FM, "Kiss FM."

== Debuts ==
- Fox Sports Radio launches at 8:00 a.m. EDT (5:00 a.m. PDT) August 28 with The Tony Bruno Show. Other hosts at the network's start included Kevin Kiley and Chuck Booms, Chris Myers and Steve Lyons, Sarge (Pickman), Bob Golic and Rich Hererra, Dan Sileo, Andrew Siciliano, Chris Rose, Craig Shemon and Ben Maller.
- KAHA in Honolulu, Hawaii signs on the air
- Internet station Radio Paradise begins operation
- Little Britain debuts on BBC Radio 4
- The Best Show on WFMU with Tom Scharpling debuts in October
- 106.7 Kool has been brand switched in the Philippines.

== Deaths ==
- January 28 - Jean Metcalfe, 76, English radio broadcaster
- February 4 - Phil Tonken, 80, American radio and television announcer
- February 5 - Ward Cornell, 75, Canadian radio/TV broadcaster and educator
- April 10 - Peter Jones, 79, British comic actor
- April 25 - Florence Freeman, 88, American soap opera actress in the Golden Age of Radio
- August 6 - Sir Robin Day, 76, British political broadcaster
- October 21 - Frankie Crocker, 62, New York City radio disc jockey

== See also ==
- Radio broadcasting
