= KBOB =

KBOB may refer to:

- KBOB (AM), a radio station (1550 AM) licensed to serve Springfield, Missouri, United States
- KBOB-FM, a radio station (97.1 FM) licensed to serve Haven, Kansas, United States
- KBOB (Iowa), a radio station (1170 AM) licensed to serve Davenport, Iowa, United States
- KIIK-FM, a radio station on 104.9 MHz licensed to serve DeWitt, Iowa, which held the call sign KBOB-FM from 2000 to 2014
- KBEA-FM, a radio station on 99.7 MHz licensed to serve Muscatine, Iowa, which held the call sign KBOB from 1994 to 2000
