= Tom Poleman =

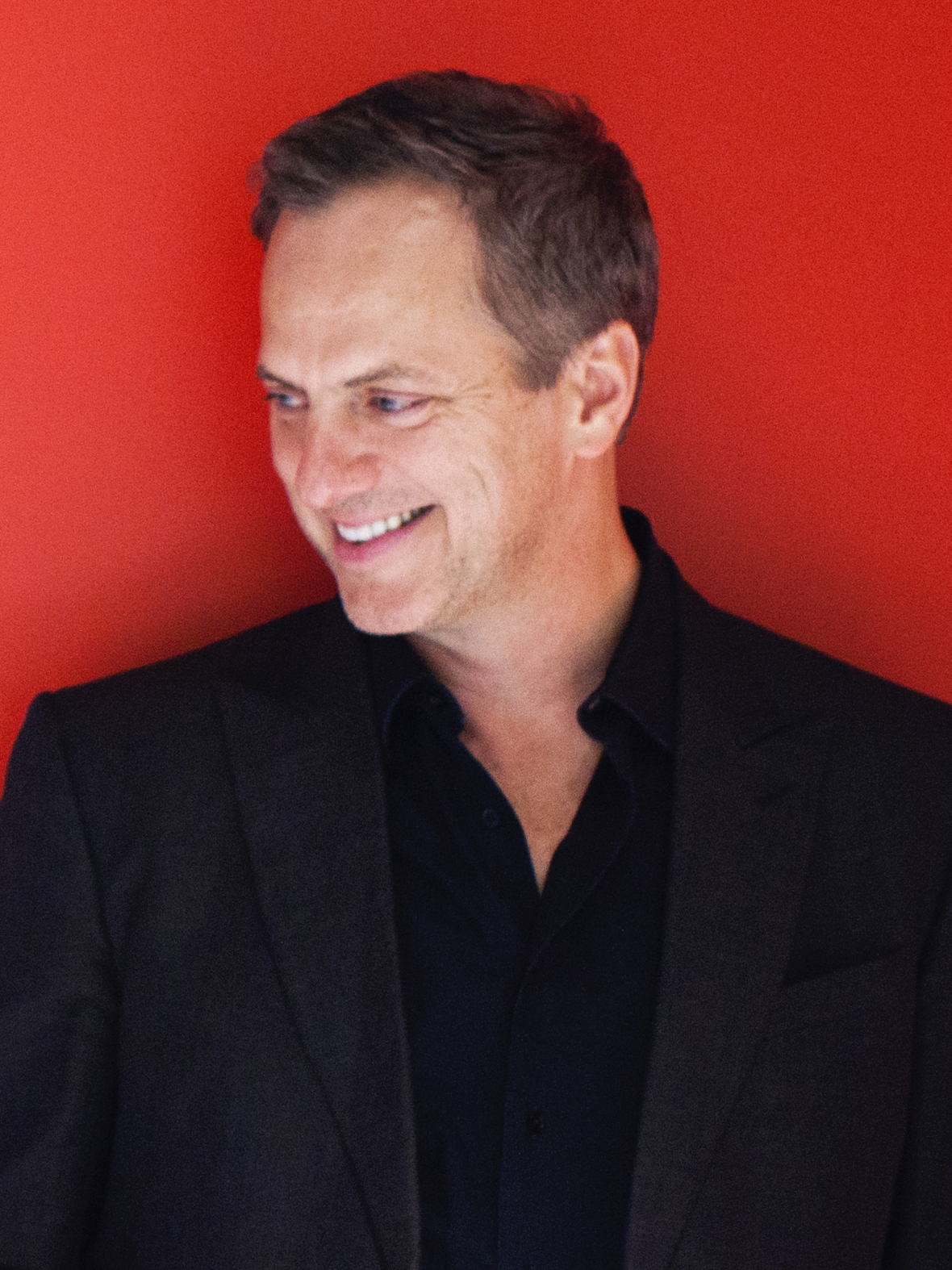
Image of Tom Poleman

Tom Poleman is President, National Programming Platforms, for iHeartMedia Radio. In his role, Poleman oversees Clear Channel Radio's National Programming Platforms group, which includes music and event marketing, label and artist relations, on-air talent development, digital programming and a network of format-specific brand managers.

Poleman is responsible for developing events like September 2011's iHeartRadio Music Festival in Las Vegas.

Prior to his appointment to President, National Programming Platforms, he was Senior Vice President of Programming for Clear Channel Radio, where his oversight included the New York Cluster WHTZ, WLTW, WKTU, Q104.3, Power 105.1, and WALK-FM. Tom joined Z100 in 1996 from KRBE Houston. Before that, he was employed at WKCI-FM and WAVZ New Haven and WALK Long Island. Poleman started as a DJ at Cornell University's commercial, student-owned radio station WVBR-FM in Ithaca and served as its program director during his senior year, prior to graduating in 1986.

Tom Poleman is credited with bringing Z100 from #18 in the market to the top five, doubling its ratings in two years, and making it the most listened-to top-40 station in the United States. He also brought all five New York City Clear Channel stations into the top 15.
