= KQCS =

KQCS refers to the following:

- KJOC (FM), a radio station (93.5 MHz) licensed to Bettendorf, Iowa, United States, which used the KQCS call sign from 1990 to 1995 and from 2004 to 2014
- KIIK-FM, a radio station (104.9 MHz) licensed to DeWitt, Iowa, United States, which used the KQCS call sign from 2014 to 2016
