= KJOC =

KJOC may refer to:

- KBOB (Iowa), a radio station (1170 kHz) licensed to Davenport, Iowa, United States, which held the KJOC callsign from 1993 to 2014
- KJOC (FM), a radio station (93.5 MHz) licensed to Bettendorf, Iowa, United States
