= Carolina Bermudez =

American actress

Carolina Maria Bermudez
- Born: May 18, 1978 (age 48); Warren, Ohio, United States
- Education: ASU
- Presenting career
- Show: Carolina With Greg T in the Morning
- Station: WKTU
- Time slot: 6-10a.m., Monday through Friday
- Country: United States
- Website: Official website

Carolina Maria Bermudez (born May 18, 1978) is a Nicaraguan-American radio presenter, formerly of Elvis Duran and the Morning Show in New York City on WHTZ ("Z100"), which is also simulcast in Miami on WHYI ("Y100"), in Philadelphia on WIOQ ("Q102"), and in various other markets around the country through syndication by Premiere Radio Networks.

== Career ==
From Ohio, Bermudez graduated from Arizona State University with a B.A. in broadcast journalism. She was a member of the sorority Kappa Alpha Theta. She moved to Los Angeles after college, where she studied acting. A freelance job for the Latin Billboard Awards brought her to Miami, where she worked at WHYI.

Bermudez joined Elvis Duran and the Morning Show on January 17, 2005. Bermudez came to Z100 from Y100 in Miami, where she had been a part of the "Kenny & Footy Morning Show" (together with co-host Froggy). This was the Miami morning show that Elvis Duran and the Morning Show replaced in May 2006.

Bermudez is also senior editor at In Touch Weekly Magazine. She appears frequently on CNN Headline News Showbiz Tonight, E! News, VH1 and other entertainment programs as a contributing editor. She is also a recurring guest expert on The Maury Povich Show and has starred as Blanca Morales on the daytime soap opera One Life to Live.

Bermudez is active in various charities working with her parents' native country, Nicaragua, including Bridges to Community and The Mustard Seed Guild of Greater New York.

Bermudez can also be heard for the New York Mets on "Fiesta Latina" and "Merengue Nights"; she became the first woman ever to announce at Shea Stadium in 2007 and Citi Field in 2009.

On May 29, 2012, Bermudez announced her departure from the Elvis Duran and the Morning Show after seven and a half years, to launch a career in television. She later announced that she was joining Long Island-based WLNY-TV's new morning show Live From The Couch.

On May 23, 2014, it was announced Live From the Couch had been cancelled.

On September 3, 2014, it was announced she was joining Paul "Cubby" Bryant on New York City radio station WKTU. On May 28, 2019, Bryant moved to WLTW and Bermudez hosted the WKTU morning show with temporary guest host Bartel until a new co-host was named. In September 2019, Greg T the Fratboy from Z100 announced he would be leaving Elvis Duran and the Morning Show to become a co-host with Carolina. In June 2024, for unknown reasons, Carolina and Greg T were pulled from the WKTU lineup.

Also has 2 kids, Noah and Asher (12) and (10), who both go to Long Island schools.
