= Whoopi (disambiguation) =

Whoopi is usually associated with American comedian Whoopi Goldberg.

Whoopi may also refer to:

- Whoopi (TV series), Whoopi Goldberg's short-lived NBC 2003–2004 sitcom
- Wake Up with Whoopi, Whoopi Goldberg's radio show, 2006–2008
