= Backtrax USA =

Backtrax USA is a weekly two-hour radio program hosted by former WHTZ (Z100) disc jockey Kid Kelly that premiered in 1992. The original show highlights hit music from the 1980s. Since 2003, Backtrax USA has also offered a 1990s version of the show featuring hits from that decade. Affiliate stations may air either version or both. The program is distributed by Westwood One in the United States and by Premiere Radio Networks elsewhere.

== History ==
Backtrax USA premiered in December 1992 with a two-hour block of hit songs from the 1980s. The 1990s edition launched in January 2003. In March 1998, a special version of the show debuted that aired on board United Airlines aircraft and Air Force One. As of 2012, Backtrax USA has aired more than 1,000 episodes.

In January 2018, Backtrax USA hired WASH-FM DJ Toby Knapp as music curator for the 1990s version of the show and substitute host for both the 1980s and 1990s versions. Previously, Knapp and Kid Kelly had worked together at WBHT in Scranton, Pennsylvania in the mid-1990s.

In April 2018, Kid Kelly was inducted into the National Radio Hall of Fame under the category of Music Format On-Air Personality. The selection was based on a vote by the general public, for his work with both Backtrax USA and Sirius XM Hits 1.

For many years, Cubby Bryant served as fill in host. The current fill in host is Toby Knapp, who last hosted the show in January 2023.

In December 2025 the 80s version of the show got all new jingles from JAM that recreate many of the Z100 from the 1980s. The 80s version also unofficially rebranded as 80s Backtrax, dropping the USA. In early 2026, both shows adapted a "Top 25 Hot Hits Countdown" format, dropping many of the pop culture trivia commentary in favor of a faster paced delivery and commentary relating to the music. .

The show began airing repeated episodes the weekend of July 25/26, 2026. Two weeks later the 80s show reverted back to the original jingle package along with encore episodes of shows from 2020. Newly produced episodes resumed on Labor Day weekend 2026, but feature identical music logs from the show that matches with the same week in 2020. (i.e., the shows from the weekend of October 31/November 1, 2026 feature newly recorded commentary from Kid Kelly, but feature a nearly identical music log from the show that aired the weekend of October 31/November 1, 2020).

On November 9, 2026, it was announced that both versions of the show will end their run the weekend of November 28.
