= John Bell (radio personality) =

New Jersey radio personality, born 1934

- Born: December 14, 1934 (age 91); United States
- Presenting career
- Country: United States
- Previous show: Elvis Duran and the Morning Show
- Website: Official Website

John Bell is a radio personality from Jersey City, New Jersey. He is widely known for his contributions as one of the original staff members on WHTZ and Elvis Duran and the Morning Show (formerly known as The Z Morning Zoo). John actually started his career in the late-1970s with the previous radio station occupying the current dial position that is now Z100. At that time he was employed by WVNJ-FM 100.3 FM as an airstaffer. The station played mostly instrumental easy listening. The license was sold in 1983 excluding the building and transmitter. He was the only air staffer that stayed on but other off the air people also remained. He was known by Z100 staff and listeners as the, "Voice of Reason." He was also the last original member of the Z100 staff (actually there prior to the 1983 sign on as mentioned) until his unexpected termination in March 2010.

On March 18, 2010, John Bell's contract with Z100 was terminated due to what he was told was a "budget cut". According to Examiner.com, John stated that he never planned on leaving the radio station in what was then the foreseeable future. He also stated that the station wanted people to think he had "voluntarily retired or left the station on his own to pursue other interests" in order to prevent an uproar from fans of him and the show." John also said that Elvis Duran wanted to be present at the termination meeting, but top executives wouldn't let that happen. His last official day on the show was March 18 but did return on March 22, 2010 where he had the opportunity to say goodbye to fans.

Bell has been a resident of Hillsborough Township, New Jersey.
