= Elvis Duran and the Morning Show =

American weekday morning radio program

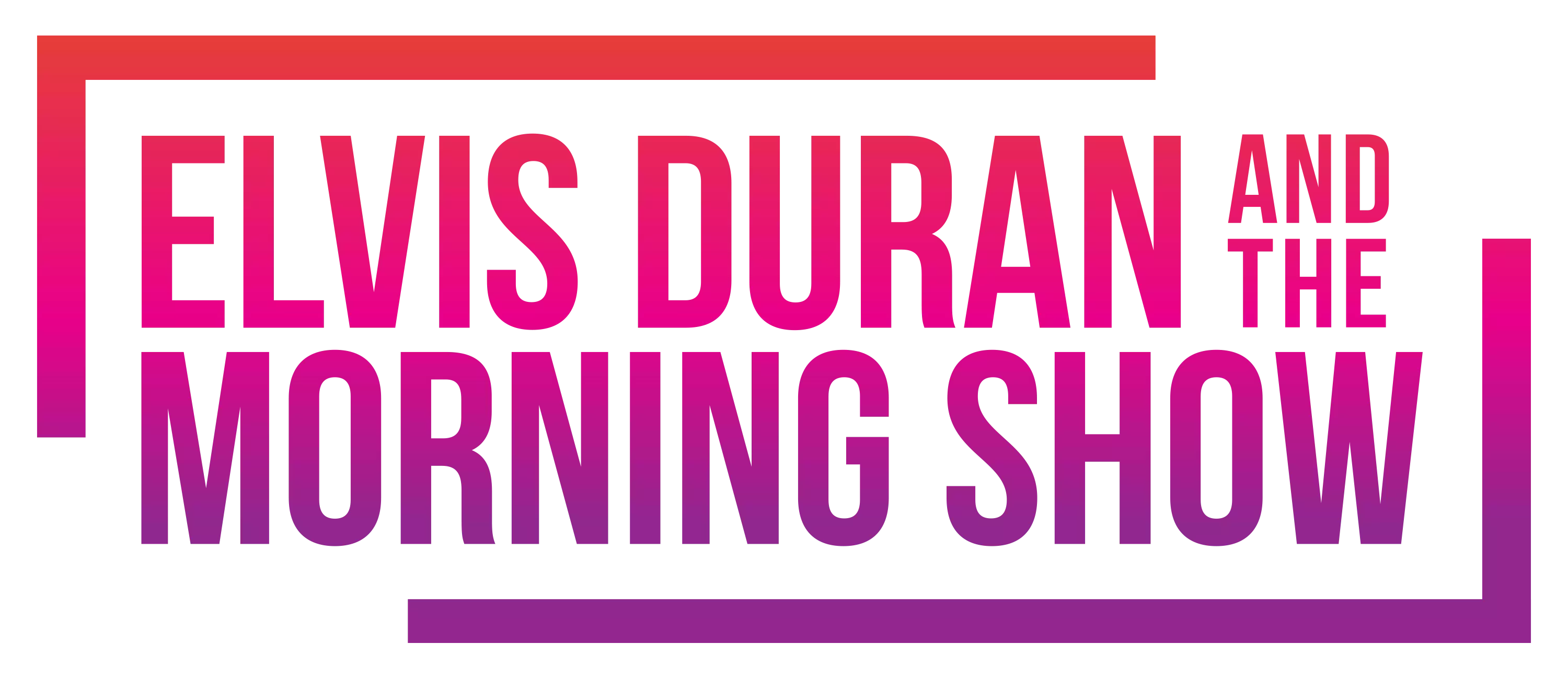
- Show logo (2023–present)
- Genre: Comedy, talk, music
- Running time: 3 hours 50 minutes (including commercials)
- Country of origin: United States
- Home station: WHTZ (New York City)
- Syndicates: Premiere Networks
- Hosted by: Elvis Duran; Danielle Monaro; Medha Gandhi
- Starring: Froggy; Skeery Jones; Garrett Vogel; Scotty B.; Coaster Boy Josh; Straight Nate; Sam; Diamond; Andrew; Deanna
- Announcer: Dave Foxx; Mo' Bounce; Loren Raye
- Created by: WHTZ
- Produced by: Nate Marino
- Original release: 1996 (at WHTZ)
- Website: elvisduran.iheart.com

Elvis Duran and the Morning Show (formerly known as The Z Morning Zoo) is an American syndicated weekday morning radio program hosted by Elvis Duran. The show originates from the studios of Newark-licensed WHTZ in New York City, a Top 40 outlet branded as "Z100". The show is also syndicated through Premiere Radio Networks in over 80 markets such as Philadelphia, Miami, Cleveland, Pittsburgh, and Richmond, Virginia. The live show had previously been available in Canada via Toronto's now-defunct Proud FM. The live airing of the show is weekdays from 6 to 10 a.m. Eastern time, with most Central markets airing it live from 5 to 9 am, and other stations further west taking the show on delay. Some stations air a 5 am "pre-show" (two pre-recorded segments and a phone tap) before the actual show. A "best of the week" compilation show is also carried on Saturday mornings by some stations.

== Overview and casting ==
=== 1996–1999 ===
The popular "morning zoo" format began in 1981 at WRBQ-FM of Tampa, after which it was brought to WHTZ in 1983 by concept co-originator Scott Shannon. The format was widely employed, even being implemented at WHTZ's sister station in Cleveland, rock-formatted WMMS. The morning zoo formula at WHTZ lasted until 1994.

The show began on Z100 New York in 1996. Much of the original show members like Elvis Duran, Danielle Monaro, Skeery Jones and Scotty B are still cast members to this day.

Although the show was originally called, "Elvis, Elliot and the Z Morning Zoo," Elliot Segal left the show in August 1999, to host Elliot in the Morning on WWDC (FM).

=== 2000–2010 ===
Logo from 2005 to 2022

The show began to be syndicated to WHCY-FM in 2003.

Christine Nagy left the show in January 2005, now at WLTW.

Also, in 2005 Carolina Bermudez and Froggy joined the show.

The show began national syndication on May 22, 2006, starting with WHYI-FM Fort Lauderdale/Miami, then WIOQ Philadelphia on July 22, 2008, and WAKS Cleveland on August 25, 2008, with approximately 75 stations now carrying the show after Clear Channel's Premiere Radio Networks began to offer the program nationally in March 2009.

Until May 2008, the show was known as "Elvis Duran and The (Y/Z) Morning Zoo". With the addition of more stations, the word "Zoo" was replaced with "Show" to be more generic and to not conflict with other morning shows in other potential affiliate cities that might have a "Zoo" show.

John Bell left the show on March 22, 2010.

According to an Instagram post from Elvis Duran, Uncle Johnny died on May 3, 2024.

== Syndicated stations ==
=== NY metro area ===
- Z100 NYC – flagship radio station

=== New England ===
- KC 101 – New Haven/Hamden, CT
- Y101 FM – Cape Cod/Hyannis, MA
- 95 Triple X – Burlington/Colchester, VT
- 105.5 JYY – Concord/Hooksett, NH
- Z107 – Portsmouth, NH

=== Eastern seaboard ===
- 96.1 KISS-FM – Poughkeepsie, NY
- KISS 102.3 – Albany/Latham, NY
- NOW 105.7 Binghamton/Vestal, NY
- HOT 107-9 – Syracuse, NY
- KISS 106.7 – Rochester, NY
- Star 104 – Erie, PA
- FM 97 – Lancaster, PA
- Q102 – Philadelphia/Bala Cynwyd, PA
- V97 – Williamsport, PA
- Hot 101.9 – Charlottesville, VA
- 93.7 Now – Harrisonburg, VA
- Q94 – Richmond, VA
- Kiss 95.9 – Salisbury/Ocean City, MD
- Power 97.3 – Albany, GA
- Q107.3 – Columbus, GA

=== Florida ===
- Q92.9 – Gainesville-Ocala, FL
- 97.9 KISS FM – Jacksonville, FL
- KISS 95.1 – Melbourne, FL
- Y100 – Miami/Miramar, FL (omits last hour of show)
- 107.1 KISS FM – Tallahassee, FL

=== Midwest ===
- 96.5 KISS FM – Akron/Cleveland, OH
- Channel 99.9 – Dayton, OH
- 93.9 Kiss FM – Lima, OH
- 102 The River – Vienna, WV
- KISS 95.7 – Wheeling, WV
- Z104 – Madison, WI
- Star 106.9 – Marion, IN
- 98.5 KISS FM – Peoria, IL
- Real 92.9 – Quincy, IL
- 101.3 KISS FM – Davenport, IA
- 107.5 KISS FM – Des Moines, IA
- 107.1 KISS FM – Sioux City, IA
- Z96.3 – Manhattan, KS
- Channel 96.3 – Wichita, KS
- 96.1 Kiss FM – Omaha, NE

=== Texas ===
- 103-1 KISS FM – Bryan/College Station, TX
- Hot 106.1 – Laredo, TX
- 97.5 FM – Waco, TX

=== Southern United States ===
- Hot Mix 101.9 – Fayetteville, AR
- Hot 94.9 – Little Rock, AR
- 92.1 The Beat – Tulsa, OK

=== Western United States ===
- Star 107.7 – Farmington, NM
- 99.9 XTC – Gallup, NM
- 96.7 KISS FM – Bozeman, MT
- Power 94 – Bend, OR
