= Cubby Bryant =

American radio personality (born 1971)

- Born: Paul Bryant; June 1, 1971 (age 55); Virginia Beach, Virginia, United States
- Presenting career
- Show: Cubby & Christine In The Morning
- Station: WLTW
- Time slot: 6:00am-10:00am
- Country: United States
- Previous show: Wake Up With Whoopi
- Website: Official Website

Paul "Cubby" Bryant (born June 1, 1971) is an American on-air radio personality who has hosted and co-hosted programs at stations in multiple markets and in syndication. Notable tenures, all based in New York City, include ten years at WHTZ (Z100), co-hosting 103.5 WKTU's syndicated Wake Up With Whoopi morning show with Whoopi Goldberg, taking over solo morning duties at WKTU following the cancellation of Wake Up..., and co-headlining the morning show at 106.7 WLTW beginning in May 2019.

== Career ==
Bryant began his radio career in his hometown of Virginia Beach, VA at WGH-FM (97 Star) in 1988, where he inherited his radio nickname Cubby (given to him by WGH DJs Tony Macrini and Jeff Moreau) for being so young (at the time 16) and in radio. It was a takeoff of Alabama football coach Paul "Bear" Bryant (no relation). In September 1990, Bryant joined 104.1 KRBE in Houston, TX as Night Host and Music Director.

In April 1996, Bryant began his tenure at WHTZ (Z100) in New York City as Afternoon Drive Host and Music Director. In 2000, Bryant went around the world with the group Backstreet Boys to promote the release of Black & Blue, the boys traveled around the world in 100 hours to Sweden, Japan, Australia, South Africa, Brazil, and the US; 55 of the hours were spent traveling and 45 were spent making public appearances.

In mid-2006, Bryant announced he would be leaving WHTZ after a ten-year run with the station, to co-host Wake Up With Whoopi. WKTU dropped Wake Up With Whoopi from its lineup in November 2007, and in January 2008, Bryant left the show (still airing in syndication in a few markets) to return to WKTU, this time as the station's solo morning host.

In 2010, Bryant and Cindy Vero co-hosted WKTU’s Cubby and Cindy morning show. In 2014, Bryant was joined by co-host Carolina Bermudez. On May 28, 2019, Bryant moved to WLTW as co-host of the morning show with Christine Nagy.

Bryant is a resident of East Brunswick, NJ after moving from New York City. He was born and raised in Virginia Beach, Virginia.

== Video appearances ==
In November 2001, Bryant appeared on Hollywood Squares as a contestant on "Radio DJ Week". He went to the bonus round but eventually lost. Bryant did however win $11,000 for the charity Musicians On Call.

Bryant is featured in the video for Walk Away by Kelly Clarkson. He is the DJ heard introducing the song over the radio at the beginning of the video.

Bryant appeared briefly in the closing credits of the 2000 movie "Longshot" as a stock reporter. Although the footage was ultimately excluded from the film, the filmmakers included a short clip in the closing credits. Bryant reportedly spent more than four hours filming the role.

Bryant was seen on HBO's "NSync - Live at Madison Square Garden" in 2001.

== Other appearances ==
Bryant served as fill-in host for Kid Kelly on his syndicated music program Backtrax USA.

Bryant's voice is featured in the basketball video game AND 1 Streetball for PlayStation 2 and Xbox.

Bryant made a brief appearance on the season premiere of American Idol (Season 12) on January 16, 2013.
