= Magic Matt Alan =

American radio personality (born 1965)

- Born: Magic Matt Alan; 1965 (age 60–61); Portland, Oregon, US
- Occupation: Radio personality

Magic Matt Alan (born 1965) is an American radio personality best known for his stints at leading CHR/Top 40 stations Z100 in New York City and Afternoon Drive TWICE at KIIS-FM in Los Angeles. He also performs as a magician, has acted in several movies and is a former host on music video channel VH-1.

== Biography ==
Alan was born in Portland, Oregon and began his career in radio at KRKO in Everett, Washington. After stints at KNBQ in Tacoma, Seattle's KYYX, KJR, KFI Los Angeles and at KRBE in Houston, he moved to Z100 in New York City. In 1987, Alan married former KRBE Music Director Helene Pina. Alan came to prominence as the most listened to afternoon drive time radio personality in America drive time DJ at the leading New York Top 40 radio station Z100 in the '80s. However, Z100 star DJ Scott Shannon was a fixture in the morning shift, blocking any possibility of Alan graduating to that slot.

In 1989, after a successful stint in New York City, Alan was lured to leading Los Angeles Top 40 station 102.7 KIIS-FM. Alan's "high energy" afternoon show was again very successful in this market. In fact, by 1991, Alan's ratings had surpassed those of nationally syndicated KIIS-FM morning host Rick Dees. (The statement RE: "Alan pressed management" is 100% untrue). "I never had ANY interest in performing the morning show unless it was to fill in for Rigdon"!! Alan pressed the KIIS-FM management for a promotion to the breakfast shift, but the station refused, according to Alan, because Dees was tied to a long-term contract. This impasse led to Alan being fired from KIIS-FM in October 1991, with management citing philosophical differences over the direction of his show.

After a stint in San Diego, and a brief return to KIIS-FM in 1996, Alan, also known as Mr. Cigar, created OUTLAW RADIO USA broadcasting from an 1876 style Virginia City Bar built in his backyard. His live Saturday show on the Internet and Terrestrial radio stations features many famous and semi-famous guests, including Meatloaf, ZZ Top, Ryan Stiles, EWF plus a crew of "regulars" whose motto is "We Smoke We Drink We Interrupt." Alan is currently heard on the Sirius Satellite Radio Network '70s on 7 channel. In 2013, Matt Alan landed a supporting role in the motion picture CATEGORY 5, starring Burt Reynolds. Alan's character, Michael Scott Shannon, was named in honor of Alan's real life radio career mentor. Alan is currently featured In the movie "Worst to first" The Z100 New York story.
