= Sean Hamilton =

American radio personality

Sean "Hollywood" Hamilton
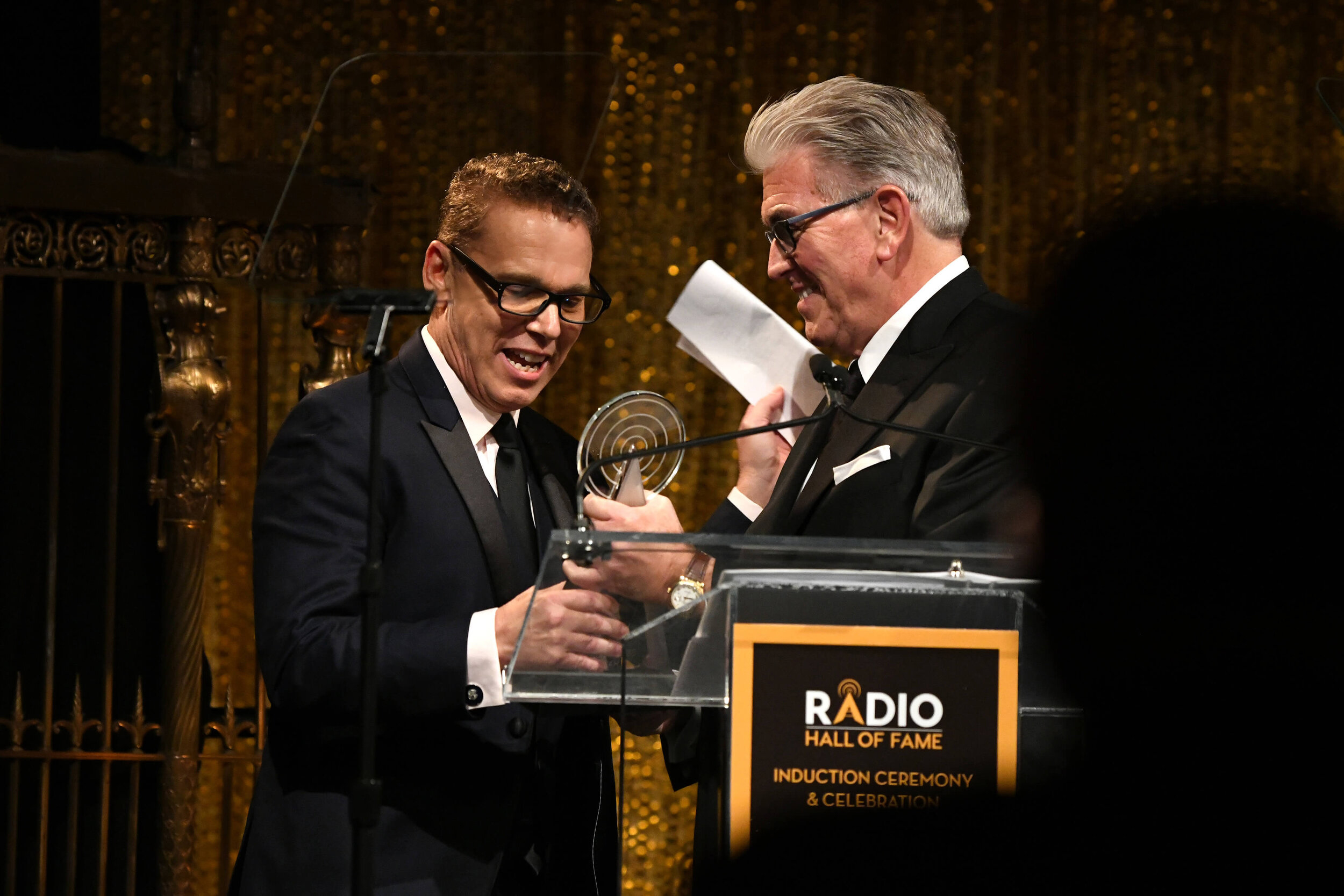
- Receiving the National Radio of Fame in 2019
- Born: Las Vegas, Nevada, United States
- Citizenship: United States
- Occupations: Radio & Television Personality, Actor.
- Employer(s): iHeartMedia, Premiere Networks

Sean "Hollywood" Hamilton is an American radio personality. On November 8, 2019, he was inducted into the National Radio Hall of Fame. He can be heard weekday mornings hosting the "Hollywood Hamilton Show & The KTU Morning Crew" on WKTU in New York City. On October 5, 2018, iHeartMedia announced a new long-term agreement with Hamilton. Robert Pittman, chairman and CEO of iHeartMedia Inc., stated, "Hollywood Hamilton is one of the most loved, respected and recognized voices and names in radio, his unparalleled ability to connect with both listeners and music's biggest artists is a true representation of what makes radio the most powerful medium in the U.S."

== Early life ==
Hamilton was born and raised in both Las Vegas and Reno, Nevada. Both his parents were in show business; his father, Al, was the entertainment director for major Nevada hotels and casinos, and also a comedian who performed in those establishments. Hamilton's mother, April Ames, was a singer for Harry James, Sam Donahue, Buddy Rich, and others during the "big band" era. She made appearances on Johnny Carson and George Gobel television shows. Later, during the 1970s, she performed on the Nevada casino circuit with her own band, April Ames and The Dames. Hamilton got the nickname "Hollywood" when he was nine years old. While sitting backstage watching his father's Las Vegas show wearing a suit and bow tie, one of his father's showgirls passed by, stopped, and called him "Little Hollywood".

== Broadcasting career ==
While still in high school, Hamilton landed his first job in commercial radio after gaining recognition from an illegal pirate radio station, broadcasting from a walk-in closet in his parents' home in Reno, Nevada. After weeks of complaints from local commercial radio stations, the Federal Communications Commission issued a formal cease and desist. It wasn't until then, that Hamilton's parents even knew of such an operation.

In 1990 actor Christian Slater studied the role of playing a DJ for the motion picture Pump Up the Volume under the tutelage of then friend Hamilton. Because Sean Hamilton's start in radio was very similar to the storyline in the movie, Christian's Mother Mary Jo Slater had personally asked Sean if he'd work with Christian on and off the air while working at KIISFM in Los Angeles.

=== WKTU New York City ===
In 1996, Clear Channel convinced Hamilton to relocate back to New York City to host a show for their WKTU evening slot. Hamilton brought a sidekick/comedian along by the name of Goumba Johnny, their chemistry earned them top ratings consistently for two years. Because of their overwhelming success, in September 2006 Clear Channel decided to promote the duo to WKTU's afternoon drive.

In December 2010, with the departure of sidekick Goumba Johnny, Hamilton started hosting the afternoon drive-time show solo. Since then his show became not only the highest rated afternoon show in the New York metro area but currently also holds the highest rated share for all radio stations in New York. (8.2 share 25–54 demographic, according to the Arbitron PPM/Summer rating system).

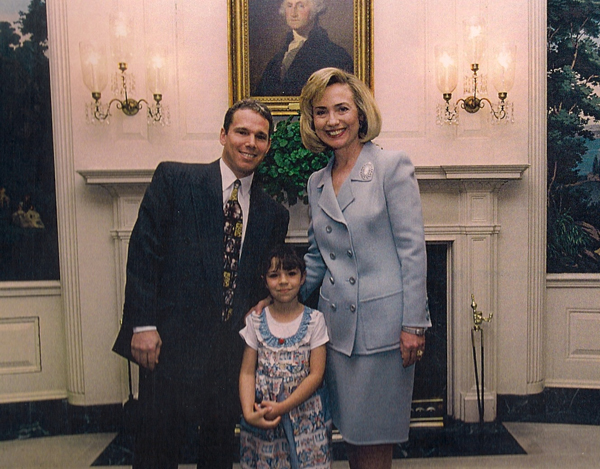
Hamilton, along with his daughter Taylor joining the First Lady in the White House in 1996.

In 1996, Hamilton was asked to host the annual Easter Egg Roll at the White House with President Bill Clinton and first Lady Hillary Clinton in Washington, D.C.

On September 2, 2015, WKTU announced that Sean ‘Hollywood’ Hamilton had signed a new three-year deal to extend his contract through 2018. In their press release it stated that Hamilton's show is currently rated the No.1 afternoon show by Arbitron's Portable People Meter (PPM) with adults ages 25–54. It goes on to mention his show features a segment called War of the Roses, weekdays at 5:40 p.m., helping KTU's 5:00 p.m. hour become the most listened to hour in New York City radio.

In 2024, Hamilton was named the new morning show host replacing “Carolina and Greg T in the Morning” with a new morning show called “Hollywood Hamilton and the KTU Morning Crew”.

=== Z100 New York KIISFM Los Angeles KBIG/MYFM Los Angeles ===
After spending only a year broadcasting in his hometown, Hamilton decided to hit the road hoping to achieve the big time one day. After three years of traveling and working for a couple small market radio stations like KLAV in Las Vegas and KIDD in Monterey, he ended up in a small town in central New Jersey called Long Branch at a station called WWZY Y-107. In 1983 while broadcasting one night, his big break came when a then famous radio executive Scott Shannon was flying commercially over Long Branch and heard Sean on the air. Upon Shannon's arrival at his destination Sean was immediately offered a job to be part of creating and premiering what is now the largest and most influential radio station in the world today, New York's WHTZ/Z100. At just 20 years old and only four years after building his small pirate radio station in Reno, Nevada, he was now on the air at Z100 in New York City. After Z100s premiere on August 2, 1983, with its legendary campaign "Worst to First", the station went #1 in the ratings in just 74 days.

Hamilton flying with the United States Blue Angels in 1997.

During those four years working in New York he helped launch and introduce such new artists as Madonna, Duran Duran, U2, Cyndi Lauper and Prince, just to name a few. Hamilton remained at Z100 from 1983 to 1987. In 1987, Hamilton was asked to head out west to join Rick Dees and 102.7 KIIS-FM. During his seven years at KIISFM he headed up a very popular concert series called "Rad Pack.” This was a concert series where many of the biggest music and teen celebrities at the time would come together to raise money for the newly found D.A.R.E. foundation (Drug Abuse Resistance Education). The attention of this series caught the eye of then President George H. W. Bush where Hamilton was asked to join the President for several youth anti-drug appearances.

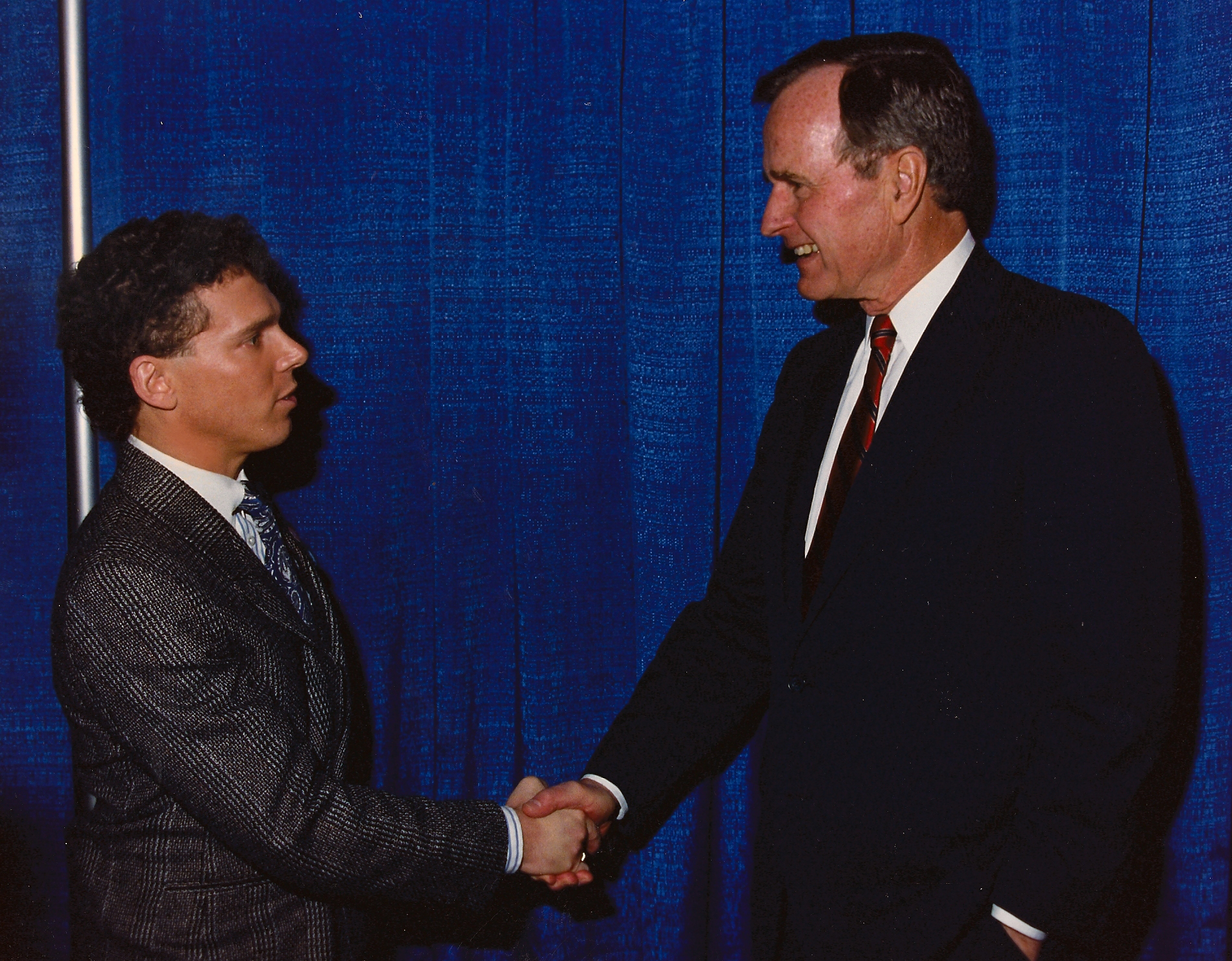
Working with President George H.W. Bush at a youth anti-drug rally in 1991.

During the late eighties through the mid-nineties while at KIIS-FM, Hamilton made many other notable high-profile appearances such as participating in the Toyota Pro/Celebrity Race Grand Prix of Long Beach and being part of the Los Angeles Air Show where he trained and flew with the United States Navy Blue Angels.

Hamilton remained at KIIS-FM from 1987 to 1994. In 1995 he was on KGGI in Riverside.

In April 2009, Clear Channel handpicked Hamilton to become the new afternoon drive host on KBIG-FM, known as 104.3 MYfm in Los Angeles. He was Clear Channel's only "music" radio personality to have an afternoon show broadcasting simultaneously in both New York and Los Angeles, Monday through Friday. Although Hamilton was live on WKTU on the east coast, his show was prerecorded three hours prior to airing at three PM on the west coast. This method of pre-recording a broadcast shift is called "tracking" and has been much criticized within the industry. In January 2011 Hamilton resigned his west coast "tracking" duties for MYfm.

=== Lovelines ===
In 1979, while working on his first commercial radio station, KCBN in Reno Nevada, Hamilton created the popular radio show called Lovelines. In 1983 shortly after being hired at Z100 in New York Hamilton resurrected the show and called it "Hollywood Hamilton's Midnight Lovelines", which offered medical and relationship advice to listeners, often with the assistance of guests, including actors and members of popular bands. After the show became a huge hit in New York Hamilton signed the rights over to the Westwood One Radio Network for an undisclosed financial amount, stopped hosting it and moved to Los Angeles to work for KIIS-FM. The name was then changed from "Lovelines" to "Loveline" and Hamilton's creation was quickly imitated on radio stations throughout America. KROQ and Dr. Drew Pinsky in Los Angeles gained the most notoriety where MTV Networks noticed it and produced a TV version of "Loveline” that ran on MTV from 1996 to 2000.

=== Disney's "Hangin' With Hollywood" ===
Mickey Mouse and Hamilton in 1992.

From 1989 to 1992, every Sunday night, Hamilton produced and was the host of a live satellite radio show from Disneyland in Southern California. The four-hour show was called "Hangin' with Hollywood" and featured interviews with music, television and motion picture celebrities on the Tomorrowland main stage. This live radio show quickly became a Disney attraction for tourists who could watch celebrities being interviewed and participate by being "guest DJs", introducing the music on the air. However, because of Disney's strict rules and regulations regarding their image, the show came to an end in the winter of 1992. Hamilton remains an honorary citizen of Disneyland, an accolade that Mickey and friends personally presented to him on his birthday, March 25, 1989.

=== Radio Syndication: Weekend Top30 & Remix Top30 ===
Hamilton is the host and executive producer of three syndicated radio shows: Hollywood Hamilton's Weekend Top 30, which has both pop and urban versions, and the Remix Top 30, an EDM show that features club deejays remixing the top hits of the week featuring celebrity guests. Hamilton has hosted both the pop and urban versions simultaneously until 2009, with Ramiro Torres (who was later replaced with DJ Pup Dawg) taking over hosting duties for the urban version. Producer and field reporter for the WT30 pop and urban versions is Michelle Parisi. She won the 2020 Gracie Award for Producer Entertainment, Music. She is a former reporter and writer for Casey Kasem and national marketing for Rockline, in addition to being on air at legendary stations 105.5 KNAC-FM/Los Angeles and 93 WQFM/Milwaukee. She is currently with Camaradio.org, 101.3 FM Ventura, Ca. Engineering the WT30 is Daniel Ehrlich, who has made albums with Slipknot and other acts.

Syndicated Show of the Year – 2017 Promo Only Awards.

On January 28, 2013, Hamilton signed a new deal with Premiere Networks that brings his syndicated countdown shows into the Premiere syndication stable beginning February 1, 2013. In addition, his shows will also be featured on the iHeartRadio platform, which is owned by Premiere's parent company (and Hamilton's employer) iHeartMedia

On July 31, 2017, the Remix Top 30 won Best Syndicated Show of the year at the 2017 Promo Awards in Atlantic City, New Jersey.

On August 6, 2019, the Remix Top30 won Best Syndicated Show of the year at the 1 Music Ave Awards in Ft Lauderdale, FL.

The weekend of June 26–27, 2021 was the last airing for all of Hamilton's syndicated shows. Despite this, the urban version continues to be broadcast both on radio and on streaming apps such as iHeartRadio, Dash Radio and Mixcloud under the name DJ Pup Dawg’s Top 30 Countdown, while also adding KPWR personality Kalisha Pereira as contributor.

== Television ==
Hamilton has been the spokesman and spokesmodel for companies including Sprint Nextel, Drakkar Cologne, Doritos, M&M's, Levi Strauss & Co., Pepsi and 5-Hour Energy. On his off time away from the radio industry, Hamilton's production company, Mischief Media Entertainment, has directed and produced television pilots for Telepictures, Warner Bros., Twentieth Century Fox and two half-hour pilots for Court TV entitled 29 Minutes & Counting.

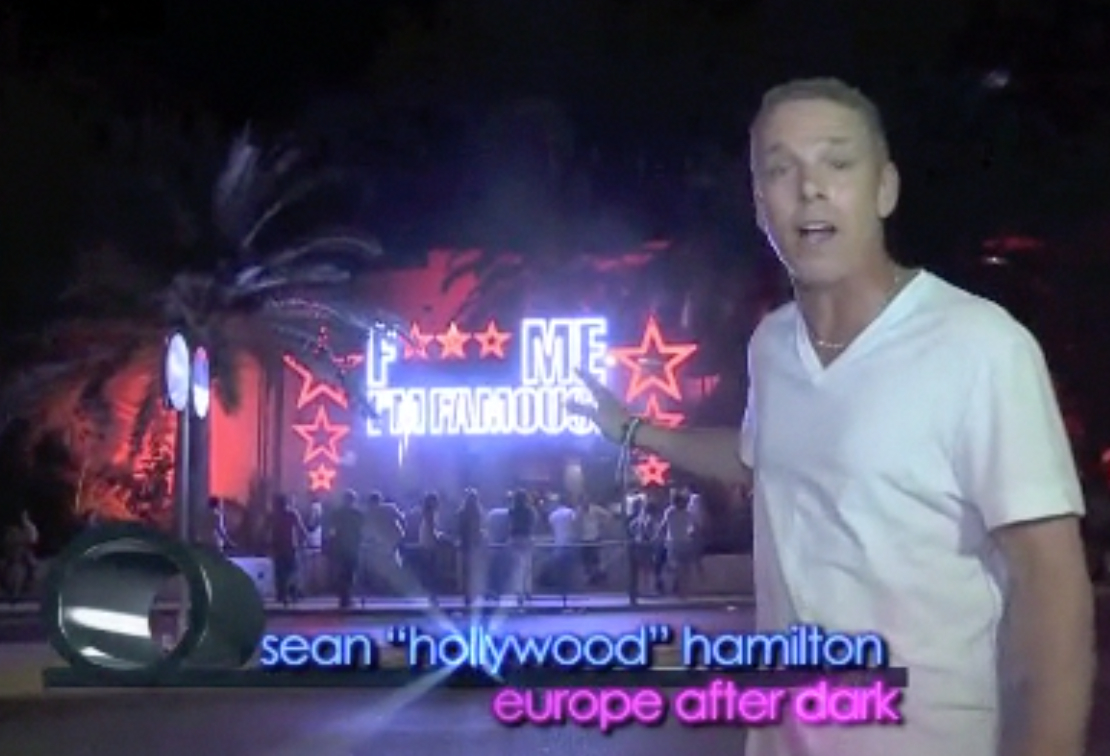
Europe After Dark TV show in Ibiza Spain.

On March 22, 2010, Hamilton signed a deal with Reel Stuff Entertainment to host and produce a new syndicated television show called Europe After Dark, distributed in Europe and Canada. This "travel destination" series will take its viewers to the hottest nightclubs and tourist spots throughout Europe. Shooting began in Ibiza, Spain July 5 and then continuing on to Amsterdam, Bucharest, Mamaia, Athens, Mykonos, Prague, Berlin, Hamburg, Budapest, Croatia, Belgrade, Paris finishing up in Rome.

== Electronic Dance Music Awards ==
Hamilton is the founder, executive producer and host of the Electronic Dance Music Awards. It is an annual music award event focusing across most all electronic dance music genres. Every March the event is held at the Eden Roc Miami Beach Hotel in Miami during the Ultra Music Festival / Miami Music Week.

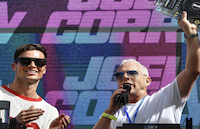
Joel Cory receives his "Deck" award from Sean Hamilton.

The awards are given out across a variety of categories including Song of the Year in Dance, Tech, House and Bass genres, Best Male and Female Artist, Best Collaboration, Remix of the Year, Best New Artist, Club DJ Of the Year, and Vocalist of the Year, among many others. The ceremony's trophies resemble DJ decks and feature a functional jog-wheel.

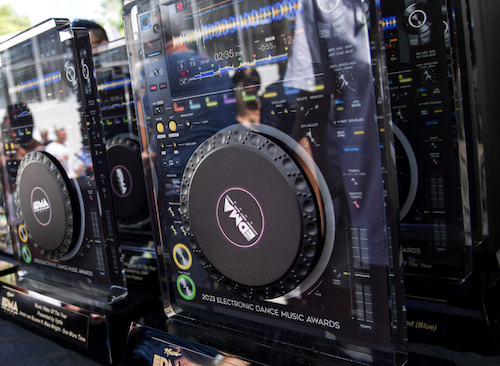
The EDMA Deck Award

The EDMAs feature DJs, music producers, international press and others.

== Personal life ==
Hamilton lives in New York City. He has been married to Marina Bello for 21 years and is the chief operating officer for their media group. His daughter, Tay Hamilton grew up listening and learning about broadcasting from her father and is also now a mid-day radio personality in Las Vegas for 95.5 The Bull, an iHeartRadio radio station.

Hamilton has begun writing a book based on his 40 years in radio and the evolution of the broadcast industry since he began in 1979.

On July 21, 2013, Hamilton alongside his wife Marina completed a six-day, 350-mile bike ride from Washington, D.C., to Pittsburgh to raise funds and awareness for Wounded Warrior Project, a non-profit organization dedicated to helping thousands of injured soldiers returning home from current conflicts and providing assistance to their families. Covering approximately 70 miles a day, the duo video blogged the entire journey on the donation site GoFundMe where they met their goal of $10,000.

== Controversy ==
In March 1999 Hamilton was fired from WKTU after setting up the husband of a woman employed by him to win a station contest. Hamilton was guilty of "overzealousness in loyalty", David Katz, Hamilton's agent released at the time. "Sean was attempting to reward a employee who had done a lot for him and the station. This wasn't for personal gain, and he wasn't trying to cover anything up. He asked the station about it both before and after he did it". Hamilton was immediately suspended following the event and returned to WKTU in August 2006 where he remains employed today.
