= Wake Up with Whoopi =

Wake Up with Whoopi was a morning radio show that aired on various stations in the United States from July 31, 2006 until March 28, 2008. Whoopi Goldberg was the host of the program. The show was syndicated by Premiere Radio Networks out of New York City.

The program was roughly one-third talk and two-thirds music (excluding commercials); the music was programmed by the individual stations in most cases. Discussion largely centered on water cooler topics as well as interviews with various guests, mostly from the entertainment industry.

== History ==
The program signed on on July 31, 2006 on flagship station WKTU, launching into syndication two weeks later.

Wake Up with Whoopi aired from 5 am - 9 am local time (live on the East Coast) in several markets. At its peak, the program was heard on four of the top six major markets (New York's WKTU, Chicago's WLIT, San Francisco's KKSF and Philadelphia's WISX) and approximately twenty affiliates overall such as WAMO in Pittsburgh. However, affiliates began dropping the program in the summer of 2007. Flagship station WKTU dropped the program in November 2007; the show moved its production from the WKTU studios to sister station WWPR-FM, although that station did not carry the program.

The program was produced by longtime WKTU morning show producer Michael Opelka until he left the show and the company, ending nearly 10 years of his affiliation with the station. Opelka left to join Opie and Anthony; he was replaced by a team of Matt Bosso, Lisa Jackson, and Glenn Baker. Cubby Bryant, who had been Goldberg's co-host, left the show in January 2008, staying on WKTU's morning drive.

The show's cancellation had been anticipated for months, and the last live broadcast was March 27, 2008. Wake Up with Whoopi's final broadcast on March 28, 2008 was a taped performance from the previous year, with a final sign-off by Whoopi, explaining her thoughts on the show's cancellation. When the show was cancelled, only Denver, Las Vegas, Raleigh, Utica and Muskegon were carrying the show; all but one of the stations are owned by Clear Channel Communications (Utica's WUMX was owned by Clear Channel but the company sold WUMX to Galaxy Communications, who kept the show until its cancellation).
