= WHTZ =

Contemporary hit radio station in New York City

- Newark, New Jersey; United States
- Broadcast area: New York metropolitan area
- Frequency: 100.3 MHz (HD Radio)
- RDS: PI: 692B; PTY: Top 40; PS: Z100
- Branding: Z100

Programming
- Format: Contemporary hit radio
- Affiliations: iHeartRadio; Premiere Networks

Ownership
- Owner: iHeartMedia; (iHM Licenses, LLC)
- Sister stations: WAXQ; WKTU; WLTW; WOR; WWPR-FM; WWRL

History
- First air date: June 1, 1961
- Former call signs: WVNJ-FM (1961–1983)
- Call sign meaning: From 1983 slogan; 'A new way to spell Hit(s)z'

Technical information
- Licensing authority: FCC
- Facility ID: 59953
- Class: B
- ERP: 6,000 watts (analog); 238 watts (digital)
- HAAT: 415 meters (1,362 ft)
- Transmitter coordinates: 40°44′54.3″N 73°59′8.5″W

Links
- Public license information: Public file; LMS
- Webcast: Listen live (via iHeartRadio) (Note: Due to licensing restrictions, this live stream is available in the United States only)
- Website: z100.iheart.com

WHTZ (100.3 FM) is a commercial contemporary hit radio station licensed to Newark, New Jersey, United States, and broadcasting to the New York metropolitan area. It is owned by iHeartMedia. WHTZ is the flagship station for Elvis Duran and the Morning Show. WHTZ's studios are located at 125 West 55th Street in Midtown Manhattan, while the station's transmitter is located at the Empire State Building.

In addition to a standard analog transmission, WHTZ broadcasts in the HD Radio format, and streams online via iHeartRadio. From 2001 to June 18, 2020, the station was additionally simulcast on SiriusXM satellite radio channel 12; the station remained available on its streaming service until 2022.

== History ==
=== Prior use of 100.3 MHz in New York City ===
The first station to operate on 100.3 MHz was New York's fourth FM radio station, which signed on the air June 1, 1942, as W63NY at 46.3 MHz in the old FM band. The station, which had become WHNF when it moved to 100.3, was co-owned with WHN and played easy listening music. After WHN changed its call sign to WMGM in 1948, WHNF followed suit by changing their call letters to WMGM-FM. The station shut down in February 1955, and surrendered its license to the Federal Communications Commission.

=== WVNJ-FM (1961–1983) ===
In 1958, Newark Broadcasting, owner of WVNJ (620 AM), filed with the FCC for a new FM station on 100.3 MHz at Newark. It came up against a competing application for the frequency from WMGM, proposing operation in New York City. The FCC opted to award the station to Newark, as it found that a second major FM service for Newark was more equitable than a 14th for New York City. On June 1, 1961, WVNJ-FM signed on from the AM site in Livingston, New Jersey, moving a few years later to West Orange, New Jersey.

The station, using the moniker "WVNJoy", focused on serving northern New Jersey rather than New York City. It featured an instrumentally based easy listening format (also known as beautiful music or, more commonly, "elevator music") consisting of instrumental versions of familiar songs with several soft vocal hits added per hour.

In 1980, when WRVR changed from jazz to country music, WVNJ began playing jazz music after 8 pm. Its slogan was "WVNJoy's beautiful music by day, jazz by night". In May 1983, plans were made for 100.3 FM to be purchased by Cleveland-based Malrite Communications. Malrite moved the station's studios to Secaucus, New Jersey and the transmitter to the Empire State Building. In addition, new management announced plans for a Top 40 format. The sale became final on August 1, 1983, and WVNJ-FM ceased broadcasting on 100.3 that night.

=== WHTZ – "Z100" (1983–present) ===
==== Early years ====
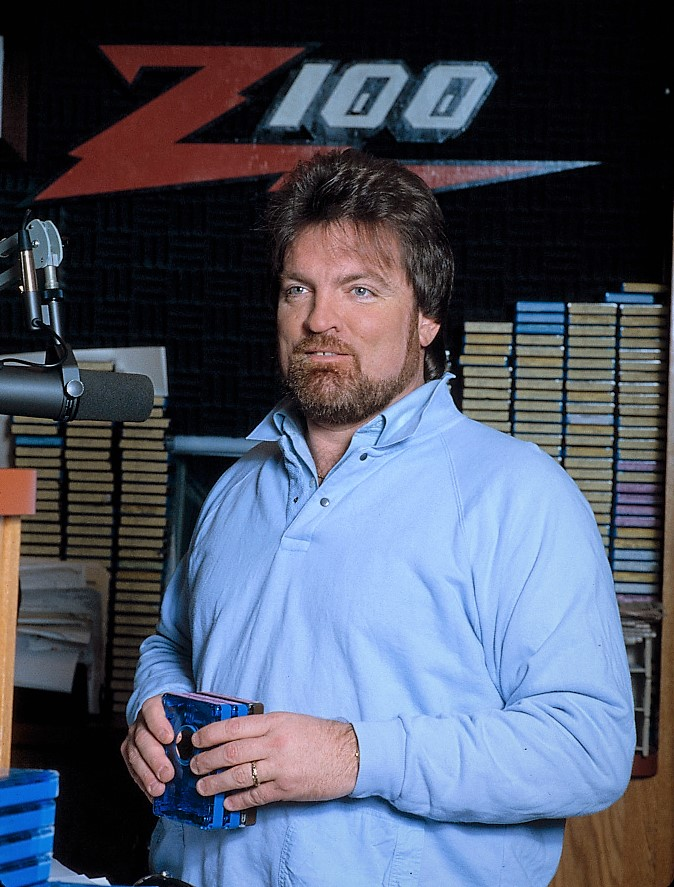
Scott Shannon at WHTZ, 1985.

The station, which now had the call sign WHTZ, went back on the air at 6:08 am on August 2, with new program director and morning jock Scott Shannon. The first two songs ever played on the station were "Eye of the Tiger" by Survivor, and "America" by Neil Diamond. The station's call sign represents the word "hits" with a Z, a fact pointed out in an early station advertising campaign where it was proclaimed that 'finally, there's a new way to spell Hitz!' to advertise the new format.

Within 74 days of signing on, in autumn 1983, WHTZ had climbed from last place to first in the New York Arbitron ratings book. Over the years, Z100 stayed with a top 40 format, while maintaining high ratings. Scott Shannon left Z100 on January 27, 1989, to start "Pirate Radio" in Los Angeles, which was part of Westwood One Inc.'s new radio division. Steve Kingston assumed programming/operations manager duties, Frankie Blue became assistant programming director, and Brian Wilson took over mornings.

In 1983, Sean "Hollywood" Hamilton was brought in to be WHTZ's first night jock. His show became a huge success, mainly due to his feature called "Hollywood's Midnight Lovelines". On November 8, 2019, Hamilton was inducted into the National Radio Hall of Fame.

Since the very beginning until the 2000s, WHTZ has used jingles from JAM Creative Productions, their first custom jingle package, being "The Flame Thrower", premiered on February 24, 1984. WHTZ's second jingle package, "Warp Factor" has since been the most popular jingle package from JAM, with approximately 2700+ cuts, on 350+ stations around the world. Between "Warp Factor," "The Flame Thrower," and three other packages, Z100 cuts make up half of JAM's all-time top ten jingles.

On August 28, 1987, Epic Records sued WHTZ for playing Michael Jackson and Siedah Garrett's song "I Just Can't Stop Loving You" the day before it was supposed to debut. The song was supposed to be released on July 21, but WHTZ played it on the afternoon of July 20.

==== 1990s: Changes ====
Wilson was replaced in July 1990, with Gary Bryan, who came over from WPLJ.

On June 6, 1991, WHTZ was accused of making sexist and racist comments when Steve Kingston told listeners to "be a JAP (Jewish-American princess) for a day". The station also played games with viewers such as "JAP trivia" and they also created a JAP Rap that they would play. While The Anti-Defamation League criticized The Morning Zoo for their anti-semitic and sexist comments, Kingston defended the station by saying the statements were harmless.

By 1991, the Top 40 format nationwide was in an identity crisis due to the rise of alternative rock, hip-hop and country. A major sign of this crisis came when WPLJ moved to a hot adult contemporary format by 1992. Z100 responded to this by adding some older songs and introducing an evening talk show called "Love Phones", which began on November 2. Ratings gradually dropped during this time. In March 1993, Malrite (Z100's owners) announced it would merge with Shamrock Broadcasting, with the sale closing that August. In July, Bryan left the morning show; in November, John Lander became morning show host. Also that year, Z100 dropped the older songs and began mixing in a moderate amount of rock music which wasn't normally being played on Top 40 stations. Initially, the station had a rock lean, but during the course of 1994, alternative rock began to become prevalent on the station.

By the end of 1994, the majority of the station's music consisted of alternative rock with only a few non-modern-rock-based songs per hour (mostly the big current hits). The station still played the current popular hits by mainstream artists such as Madonna, TLC, Janet Jackson, Mariah Carey, Seal, Bon Jovi, and others; notably, though, Z100 snubbed several big pop hits in 1995, such as "Have You Ever Really Loved a Woman?" by Bryan Adams, "You Are Not Alone" by Michael Jackson, and "I Could Fall in Love" by Selena. The station also snubbed some dance hits as well, except during their Saturday night dance show, Planet Z. During this time, the station also underwent numerous airstaff and management changes; Frankie Blue left in 1995, and Sam Milkman moved up to his position. Also in 1995, Z100 stopped using the "Morning Zoo" title, which was simply renamed "The Morning Show". Morning host John Lander left in November 1995, due to his contract not being renewed, with more airstaff gradually leaving the station shortly thereafter.

Ratings, though nowhere near the top anymore, remained steady at the station during much of the mid-1990s. However, by March 1996, there was a steep drop after WKTU signed on at 103.5 FM with a dance music format, and WXRK adapted a full-time alternative-leaning active rock format; both stations took listeners from Z100. Steve Kingston and his assistant Sam Milkman left Z100 for WXRK in spring 1996, while music director Andy Shane left for WKTU, joining another former Z100 music director, Frankie Blue. In January 1996, Steve Cochran arrived to do mornings, but by mid-April, he was gone. Z100 was undergoing a crisis at this point. The station was sold in a corporate deal to Chancellor Media.

==== 1996: Turnaround ====
In April 1996, the station brought in Tom Poleman as its new programming director. Initially, at that point, Z100 dropped all non-modern rock titles and began playing strictly pop alternative. (In addition, "Planet Z" became a new wave show as well). By May 1996, Z100 began gradually replacing its on-air staff, and the harder alternative songs were phased out. Though it initially seemed that Z100 was becoming a modern AC station, beginning that summer, the station gradually began to move back to a mainstream Top 40 format, as it added pop music from such formats as R&B, rap, and adult contemporary. Late in July 1996, dance music returned to "Planet Z".

One of Poleman's biggest moves was to switch DJ Elvis Duran from afternoons to the "Z Morning Zoo" (which was known as "The Morning Show" for the last year), Z100's popular morning show, on April 22 of that year. Despite having shared the post with other hosts (such as Elliot Segal, now at WWDC) through the years, Duran remains the "Head Zookeeper" to this day. By December 1996, Z100 was a full-time Top 40 station again. Chancellor merged with Evergreen in 1997, making WKTU a sister station of Z100. Still, both stations continued on the same courses, moderately overlapping with music.

In a 1999 merger, Z100's parent company, Chancellor, acquired Capstar, forming AMFM Inc. Shortly after the merger was finalized, AMFM was bought by Clear Channel Communications.

==== 2000s ====
In 2001, Clear Channel entered into an agreement with XM Satellite Radio to carry WHTZ on the satellite radio service.

The station used to broadcast "mini-mixes" by DJ Spinbad, a well-known DJ who created a nightly mash-up mix of the day's top songs, playing them all together, mixing, for instance, the lyrics of one with the music of another. This often lasted 15–20 minutes, and was played at seven o'clock and ten o'clock Monday through Friday. Spinbad's mix was also a part of the weekly 5 O'Clock Whistle, a tradition started in 1986 to celebrate the end of the work week.

In early 2006, Z100 launched an HD Radio station that plays songs by bands who have not gone mainstream, or have very little exposure.

In October 2007, after years of hovering near the top, Z100 once again became the highest-rated station in New York City, scoring a 5.1 rating in persons 12+ in the Summer book. That marked the first number-one finish for the station since the 1980s, according to Clear Channel New York programming guru Tom Poleman. It also scored a first-place among the 18-34 demographic in the book, as well as a second place in the 25–54 demo.

In 2008, remixer Jason Nevins joined Z100 for the "Remix at 6 with Jason Nevins", where one of Jason's remixes is played every night at 6 pm. The programming follows the Z100 playlist and gives listeners a "you heard it here first" mix premiere of projects that come straight from Jason's studio.

During the 2000s, Z100's slogan "New York's #1 Hit Music Station", used in tandem on-air with "All The Hits". The long-running "#1" part of the slogan was removed in 2007, then brought back during spring 2014. Another former slogan was "Today's Best Music".

==== 2010s ====
In 2010, WHTZ changed its own logo.

WHTZ-HD2 was the flagship station for Nick Radio, a Top 40 station aimed at children and pre-teens which broadcasts nationwide through iHeartRadio's app and uses WHTZ personnel. The station was launched in late September 2013, and was quietly shut down in late July 2019.

On September 16, 2014, Clear Channel, WHTZ's owners, renamed themselves to their current name of iHeartMedia after its increasingly successful iHeartRadio Internet radio platform.

In 2017, Mark Medina, program director of WHTZ, was named top pop programmer of the year by Billboard. He succeeded programmer Sharon Dastur, as Dastur took on a position at iHeartRadio, Z100's parent company.

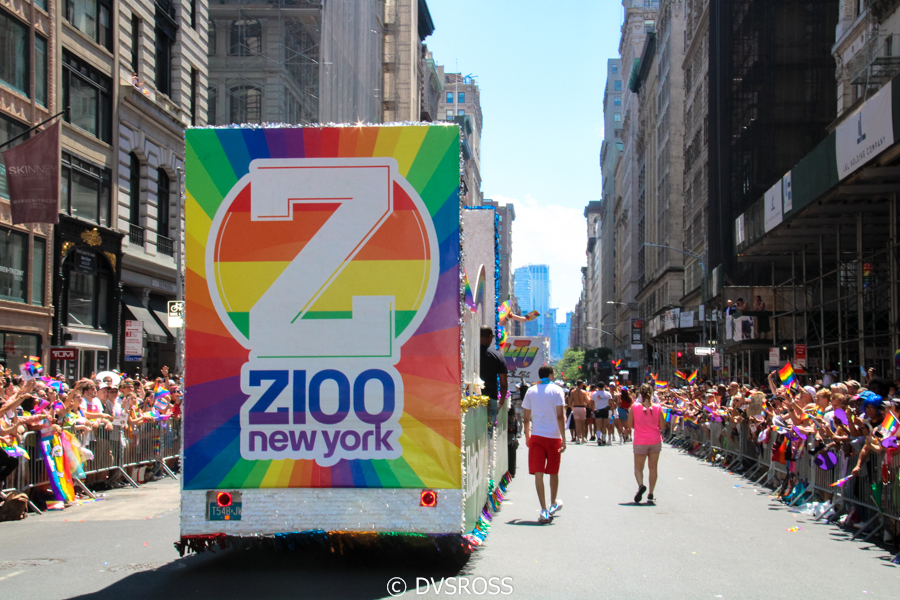
Float at Stonewall 50 – WorldPride NYC 2019

==== 2020s ====
On June 18, 2020, SiriusXM removed the WHTZ simulcast from its satellite radio service, continuing to offer the station on streaming packages. This was followed by its removal from the SiriusXM service altogether in June 2022, alongside corporate sibling KIIS-FM leaving the SiriusXM platform as well, thus pushing remaining listeners to the iHeartRadio platform.

In 2022, a documentary about the radio station entitled Worst to First: The True Story of Z100 New York was released.

On March 13, 2024, Mark Medina announced that he would leave WHTZ for SVP/programming of the iHeart Phoenix cluster. He was succeeded by Mark Adams who is also vice president of CHR for the station's parent company on May 1.

== Format ==
Z100 broadcasts a mainstream Top 40 format. While most of the songs aired are pop music, music heard also consists of R&B, alternative rock, hip-hop, rock, EDM, and dance music. On Air with Ryan Seacrest, syndicated nationally via Premiere Networks, is heard daily. The station is the New York home for Premiere Networks' American Top 40, which is also hosted by Seacrest and airs Sunday mornings.

== Morning show ==
The first version of the Z Morning Zoo came together within two months of sign-on, and featured Michael Scott Shannon, Ross Brittain, Jack Murphy, John "JR Nelson" Marik, Claire Stevens, John "Professor Jonathan B." Bell, with Kevin "Captain" Smith, and Anita Bonita. It also gained rapid popularity for its use of the character "Mr. Leonard", invented by radio personality John Carrillo of KKBQ in Houston in 1986, who subsequently moved the character to New York.

As of 2020, the morning show includes Elvis Duran, Danielle Monaro, Gandhi, Froggy, Skeery Jones, David Brody, "Straight Nate" Marino, producer Sam, Garrett, Scotty B, Coaster Boy Josh, Diamond, and Producer Jake.

The Z100 Morning Show features "Danielle's Entertainment Report", News Reports with Gandhi, "Phone Taps" (prank calls to an unsuspecting friend or relative of a listener), Song Parodies, various contests, news and traffic reports.

The show was simulcast on WHCY in western New Jersey from early 2003, until December 23, 2008, and then again from 2010 until the station's format switch in 2022. The show began syndication on May 22, 2006, starting with WHYI in Miami, followed by WIOQ in Philadelphia on July 23, 2008, and Cleveland's WAKS on August 25, 2008.

Until May 2008, the show was known as Elvis Duran and The (Y/Z) Morning Zoo. By July 2008, the "Zoo" references were later replaced with "Show". In March 2009, Clear Channel subsidiary Premiere Radio Networks added Elvis Duran and the Morning Show to its blue-ribbon lineup of nationally syndicated radio programs and is now heard coast to coast on over 70 stations. Elvis Duran and the Morning Show had both its 20th anniversary as a show and its 10th anniversary as a syndicated program in 2016.

== Annual events ==
The station annually holds popular concerts featuring the world's top-name acts: "Z100's Jingle Ball" at Madison Square Garden in Midtown Manhattan during the winter holiday season, and Z100's Zootopia in late Spring (which was last held in 2009).

The 2011 Jingle Ball was considered the biggest Jingle Ball Z100 has ever had in their existence. It drew in the biggest stars in the world including Lady Gaga, Katy Perry, Justin Bieber, David Guetta, Pitbull, and LMFAO.

From 1983 to 1991, and from 1997 to 2004, Z100 aired the "24 Hours Of Christmas" from Christmas Eve to Christmas Day. Sometimes it began at noon, and other years it would be as late as 2 pm. It was one of the first major-market Top 40 stations to play wall-to-wall Christmas music at the time. The music consisted of Christmas songs by the station's core artists mixed with well-known Christmas music by oldies artists and some traditional easy listening type artists. The station played about 125 songs in total, which were repeated over this 24-hour period. When Scott Shannon arrived at WPLJ, he began the same tradition there in 1991. Z100 discontinued the tradition in 1992 and during the "alternative years". By 1997, more core artists began creating Christmas music. As a result, Z100 reinstated the 24 hours of Christmas that year. It continued until 2004, when it was discontinued due to the desire to counter-program other co-owned stations as well as competitors.

From 1997 to 2015, the station also aired a pre-recorded countdown show of the top 100 songs for the year, based on the total number of song spins, listener requests, and weekly playlist success (peak position, weeks on). The show was then repeated an average of once a day over the following week, with a final broadcast airing in January. Between 1997 and 2004, the countdown began at noon on Christmas Day after the "24 Hours Of Christmas"; the start date moved to Christmas Eve in 2005, which was the last year where Elvis Duran and Paul "Cubby" Bryant hosted the show. In June 2006, Cubby left Z100 to co-host the nationally syndicated "Wake Up with Whoopi" Goldberg program, which aired on WKTU until Goldberg left the station. Songs that were released in the final quarter of the year could have been problematic; if a song is very popular during the last three months of the year and is in high rotation, it would often peak higher than a song that had been in medium rotation for a number of months. However, if a popular song is only in low to medium rotation during the later part of the year, it would often chart very low or not at all on the year-end countdown, only to appear very high on the countdown of the following year.

== Notable former staff ==
- Magic Matt Alan
- Ernie Anderson
- Professor Jonathan B. Bell
- Carolina Bermudez
- Gary Bryan
- Paul "Cubby" Bryant
- Adam Curry
- Elvis Duran
- Sean "Hollywood" Hamilton
- Clarke Ingram
- Jo "The Madame" Maeder
- Tony Martinez
- Dawson McAllister
- Jason Nevins
- Elliot Segal
- Scott Shannon
- DJ Spinbad

== See also ==
- Contemporary hit radio
- Morning zoo
