= WXLP =

- Moline, Illinois; United States
- Broadcast area: Quad Cities
- Frequency: 96.9 MHz
- Branding: 97X

Programming
- Format: Classic rock
- Affiliations: Compass Media Networks; United Stations Radio Networks

Ownership
- Owner: Townsquare Media; (Townsquare License, LLC)
- Sister stations: KBEA-FM, KIIK-FM, KJOC

History
- First air date: November 22, 1970
- Former call signs: WMDR (1970–1975); WHTT (1975–1978)
- Call sign meaning: "X" A reference to its branding "97X", with "LP" standing for a long play form of a record album

Technical information
- Licensing authority: FCC
- Facility ID: 13663
- Class: B
- ERP: 50,000 watts
- HAAT: 499 feet (152 m)
- Transmitter coordinates: 41°20′16.1″N 90°22′46.4″W

Links
- Public license information: Public file; LMS
- Webcast: Listen live
- Website: 97x.com

WXLP (96.9 FM) is a commercial radio station licensed to Moline, Illinois, and serving the Quad Cities area of Illinois and Iowa. The station is owned by Townsquare Media and broadcasts a classic rock radio format. Its radio studios and offices are on North Brady Street in Davenport, Iowa (along with the co-owned stations KJOC, KBEA-FM, and KIIK-FM).

WXLP has an effective radiated power (ERP) of 50,000 watts. The transmitter is on U.S. Route 150 near North 1300th Avenue in Orion, Illinois.

== History ==
Formats of WXLP
Name (call signs)	Format
97 WMDR	Beautiful music (1970–1975)
Stereo 97 (WHTT)	Adult contemporary later country (1975–1978)
The New 97X (WXLP)	AOR (1978–2004)
97 Rock (WXLP)	Active rock (2004–2007)
The All New 97X (WXLP)	Classic hits (2007–2014)
97X (WXLP)	Classic rock (2014 –present)

=== WMDR (1970–1978) ===
The station signed on in November 22, 1970 as WMDR, an American FM Radio Network affiliated station. WMDR was owned by Lee Enterprises. Studios were co-located with the station's transmitter in Orion, Illinois. WMDR broadcast this easy listening and Christian format for nearly five years before being purchased by KSTT Broadcasting, owners of the powerhouse Top 40 station KSTT 1170, in 1975.

The studios moved to Davenport in 1975, and the call sign changed to WHTT. It aired an automated adult contemporary format known as "Stereo 97". After three years, it switched to an automated country music format. WHTT was not able to bill advertising dollars or compete in the ratings with country music rival WHBF, which had adopted the country format a year earlier. For many years, WHBF (also known as "Country Sunshine Radio") was among the top-rated stations in the Quad Cities market, alongside Top 40 hit music stations KSTT and KIIK.

With WHTT underperforming, KSTT Broadcasting decided to make the switch to a live and local album-oriented rock (AOR) format that would complement but not directly compete with the company's AM station.

=== 97X (1978–2004) ===
In July 1978, KSTT program director Jim O'Hara, along with on-air personality John Keith and music director Rick Fields, put together a brand new rock station for the Quad Cities — based at least in part on WLPX in Milwaukee. Then-owner Fred Epstein liked the name "X97", but Epstein realized that the name "97X" sounded much better than the former. When the station took on its current WXLP call sign on August 31, 1978, it became known to a generation of fans and listeners as "The New 97X WXLP" or simply "The New X". Later, program director Gabe Baptiste took the station to its highest ratings in the late 1980s. From 1985 through 1986, the 97X lineup included Phil and Jack in mornings, J.J. Scott in middays, Terry Dugan in afternoons, and Greg Garron in evenings. Terry was replaced by Gene Olson in the afternoon when she became 97X's first female program director. Evenings were handled during this period by Steve DeBouvre. J.J. Scott brought his show, "The Electric Lunch" to 97X during his two-year midday run. Gene Olson brought 97X national attention when he promoted "Shoes for Imelda", gathering thousands of shoes he sent to exiled Imelda Marcos. The station's first newsman was Dave Douglas (Tom Hosmanek), also of KSTT.

Over the years, they had many top morning shows including Phil Maicke, Ian Case, and The Coach and Dwyer and Michaels. Dwyer and Michaels (real names Greg Dwyer and Bill Obenauf), who began working for the station in 1990, left for market competitor KCQQ in 1995 after a dispute over a non-compete clause that kept them off the air for six months. They were followed by a short-lived morning show before "Matt and Homey" took over the morning slot from 1996 through 1997.

Even though it still plays album cuts, the station took on more of a classic rock format over the years. 97X's blend of rock music and its host’s personalities have been cited as reasons for its high ratings in the Quad-Cities for more than 25 years.

=== 97 Rock (April 2004 - March 2007) ===
In April 2004, WXLP's format was altered as part of a series of programming changes at two Quad Cities-area Cumulus Broadcasting stations. While it kept elements of the former 97X's classic rock format, the newly christened "97 Rock" took on the hard rock format of the former "93 Rock" (KORB-FM). KORB, meanwhile, flipped to hot adult contemporary as "Star 93.5" and changed its call letters to KQCS.

=== Relaunch of 97X (March 2007-March 2014) ===
On March 12, 2007, the station switched its focus to classic hits, playing music from artists like Elton John, Boston, Chicago and Journey. The active rock format moved to KBOB-FM, which abandoned the country format it had had since 1994.

On July 13, 2007, on-air personalities Greg Dwyer and Bill Michaels returned to 97X after a 12-year absence at the station. Dwyer and Michaels left rival station KCQQ — where they had worked since 1995 — after their contract expired on December 31, 2006. As part of their contract with Clear Channel Communications (owners of KCQQ), they had to honor a non-compete restriction, meaning they could not work for a competing station in the Quad Cities for six months. In the interim, the duo worked for KRNA, an active rock station based in Cedar Rapids.

Clear Channel sued Dwyer and Michaels in February 2007, claiming that KRNA was audible in the Quad Cities area and the duo was actively promoting the upcoming show in the Quad Cities. A Scott County District Court judge, however, ruled that Dwyer and Michaels did not violate the clause since Arbitron does not consider the Quad Cities part of KRNA's market area.

=== Return to classic rock (March 2014-Present) ===
On August 30, 2013, a deal was announced in which Townsquare Media would acquire 53 Cumulus stations, including WXLP, for $238 million. The deal is part of Cumulus' acquisition of Dial Global; Townsquare and Dial Global are both controlled by Oaktree Capital Management. The sale to Townsquare was completed on November 14, 2013.

On March 3, 2014, 97X shifted its format from classic hits to classic rock.

In late 2014, 97X began experimenting with artists from the 2000s on their classic rock playlist, although it was mostly hard rock acts such as Jet, 3 Doors Down and Green Day. This experiment stopped in early 2015, when virtually all early to mid 2000s material disappeared from their playlist.

In September 2021, KCQQ flipped from classic rock to classic hits, leaving WXLP as the sole classic rock station in the Quad Cities market.

== See also ==
- Anderson, Frederick I, editor. "Joined By a River: Quad Cities." Lee Enterprises, 1982. (ISBN 0-910847-00-2)

== Programming ==
Syndicated programming on WXLP includes The House of Hair with Dee Snider and Ultimate Classic Rock Radio.
