= WKTU =

Rhythmic adult contemporary radio station in New York City

- Lake Success, New York; United States
- Broadcast area: New York metropolitan area
- Frequency: 103.5 MHz (HD Radio)
- Branding: 103.5 KTU

Programming
- Language: English
- Format: Rhythmic adult contemporary
- Subchannels: HD2: Talk radio (WOR)
- Affiliations: iHeartRadio; Premiere Networks

Ownership
- Owner: iHeartMedia; (iHM Licenses, LLC)
- Sister stations: WAXQ; WHTZ; WLTW; WOR; WWPR-FM; WWRL

History
- First air date: September 1, 1958
- Former call signs: WGLI-FM (1958–1961); WTFM (1961–1982); WAPP (1982–1986); WQHT (1986–1988); WYNY (1988–1996)

Technical information
- Licensing authority: FCC
- Facility ID: 6595
- Class: B
- ERP: 6,000 watts (analog); 238 watts (digital)
- HAAT: 415 meters (1,362 ft)
- Transmitter coordinates: 40.748444°N 73.985694°W

Links
- Public license information: Public file; LMS
- Webcast: Listen live (via iHeartRadio)
- Website: ktu.iheart.com

WKTU (103.5 FM) is a rhythmic adult contemporary formatted radio station licensed to Lake Success, New York. Owned by iHeartMedia, the station broadcasts from studios at 125 West 55th Street in Midtown Manhattan; its transmitter is located at the Empire State Building. Although licensed to a community in Nassau County, which is part of the Long Island radio market, the station is assigned by Nielsen to the New York market.

== History ==
=== WGLI-FM–WTFM (1958–1982) ===
In 1958, 103.5 MHz was assigned to Babylon, New York for WGLI-FM, simulcasting sister station WGLI (1290 AM). William Reuman, the founder and owner of WWRL in New York City, was the owner of WGLI. 103.5 MHz had previously been assigned to WPAT-FM in Paterson, New Jersey, which went on the air as WNNJ in 1949, and was deleted in early 1951.

The WTFM logo from 1980 to 1982

In March 1960, Friendly Frost Inc. (a Long Island-based appliance store chain) acquired WGLI Inc. from Reuman and his partners. In November 1961, Friendly Frost moved the station from Babylon to Lake Success, and the call sign was changed to WTFM. WTFM transmitted with 20 kW from a 200-foot tower outside the studio building at 173-15 Horace Harding Expressway visible from the Long Island Expressway. Eventually, the transmitter was relocated to the Chrysler Building, and a major signal boost was accomplished. As WTFM, the station used the slogan "The International Stereo Sound of New York", and played an instrumental-based easy listening format. Initially, it was strictly instrumental versions of pop standards, however by 1969, the station began playing soft instrumental versions of rock and roll baby boomer pop songs as well as standards. The station was eventually sold to Sydney Horne, and the company became known as WTFM, Inc. By 1971, the station began playing soft vocalists once every 15 minutes including soft songs by rock artists and standards artists. They kept this format until 1977, the reason being as an easy listening station, WTFM was up against similar stations: WRFM, WVNJ-FM, and WPAT AM & FM, that had higher ratings. As a result, the station switched to a soft rock-leaning adult contemporary format. The station would at some points be more of an AC format, while at other points more of a mellow rock format. Ultimately, ratings continued to remain low with the new format. WTFM was put up for sale in 1980, and Heftel Broadcasting made a proposal to buy the station from Sydney Horne. The plan was to switch WTFM to an album rock format, but the sale was never consummated. The station stayed up for sale and had many offers, but none that were acceptable, throughout 1980 and 1981.

=== WAPP (1982–1986) ===
The WAPP apple logo from 1982 to 1986

In early 1982, Doubleday Broadcasting Co., a subsidiary of publisher Doubleday and Company, acquired the station, and by April its call letters were changed to WAPP. However, the format would remain the same for a while longer until new ownership decided what to do with the station. On June 14, 1982, WAPP switched to an album-oriented rock format similar to WPLJ and WNEW-FM, and was renamed "The Apple 103.5"; the format began with "Won't Get Fooled Again" by The Who. The station launched with a commercial-free summer.

In 1983, a then-unknown Jon Bon Jovi visited the station and wrote and sung the jingles for the station. He spoke with DJ Chip Hobart, who suggested Bon Jovi let WAPP include the song "Runaway" on the station's compilation album of local homegrown talent. Bon Jovi was reluctant, but eventually gave them the song, on which Bon Jovi had used studio musicians to play on "Runaway" (which was written in 1980). As part of a marketing effort, WAPP-FM launched a contest called "New York Rocks 1983". Local music acts were encouraged to submit demo tapes to this competition. Among the tapes submitted to this contest was "Runaway", but didn't win the competition. Another act called the "Frankie Carr Band" won the honors. This competition was repeated in 1984. WAPP worked with WWOR-TV in nearby Secaucus, New Jersey on a music video show, Rock 9 Videos, for a short time in 1984.

As 1984 progressed, WAPP's ratings were on the upswing. However, the station's owners decided to abruptly change the station's format to CHR that October. They felt that if co-owned stations in Washington, D.C., and Minnesota could do well with the format, then this station could as well. This would not be the case, as the station could not compete with WPLJ or Z-100, and their ratings fell. The station quietly segued back in a rock direction with a rock-leaning CHR format in June 1985. The station leaned toward current based rock while playing a limited amount of rhythmic cuts. Even that would not be able to turn the station's ratings around as 92.3 FM, the original WKTU, flipped to rock as "K-Rock".

=== WQHT (1986–1988) ===
In 1986, Emmis Communications acquired WAPP from Doubleday. On August 13, 1986, WAPP began stunting with a classic rock format as "Classic 103".

On August 15, 1986, at 6 pm, The Rolling Stones' "It's All Over Now" and a bomb noise rang out, marking the end of WAPP. The station then flipped to a CHR/dance/urban contemporary format as Hot 103, New York's Hottest Mix with new call letters WQHT. The first song on "Hot" was "R.S.V.P." by Five Star. No one in the radio industry expected it, but the new format that would be labeled "rhythmic contemporary" was taking shape. WQHT was the second such station with the format, months after Emmis launched it on KPWR in Los Angeles earlier that year.

WQHT's first Program Director was Joel Salkowitz. Steve Ellis, formerly of WAPP, was music director. Don Kelly was the consultant for both WQHT and KPWR in those early months.

WQHT played a different variety of music than what was on the New York radio dial at that time. There was no CHR/Dance station in the market since WKTU left the air a year earlier. WQHT came on the air with a new and improved dance-oriented format, which radio trade magazines of the day called a hybrid format. The station mixed in top 40 hits with dance and club music of the day. The station was also known for playing "hotmixes" or extended versions of certain songs. The "hotmixes" were either just the extended versions available commercially on 12" singles, or mixes that were created by local club DJs, such as "Little" Louie Vega. They also aired regular versions of the songs that had longer intros than that of their competitors. Noel used WQHT's version of his single "Silent Morning" for the song's music video, as evidenced in the video's credits. With the debut of WQHT, some record labels such as Atco and Elektra reportedly started to see a spike in 12" single sales in the New York metropolitan area, as was reported by Billboard.

WQHT's imaging sounded similar to that of sister station KPWR, as WNAP alums Chuck Riley and Eric Edwards became the official voices of the station. While Chuck mainly voiced bumpers and sweepers, Eric on the other hand mostly voiced promos and specialty liners. These two were also the voices for other Emmis stations at the time such as KPWR, WLOL in Minneapolis–Saint Paul, and WAVA in Washington, D.C.

A month after the station's launch, WQHT began adding an airstaff. Some of the first Hot 103 DJs to join WQHT were, Deborah Rath-Howell from KPWR in Los Angeles, Al Bandiero from WKTU, Johnny "Big John" Monds from WUSL in Philadelphia, Sunny Joe Allen from KC101, Frederick "Fast Freddie" Colon and Niecie Colon from WBLS, as well as Vanessa Scott, Rufus Hurt, and Mitchell Phillips, who were hold overs from WAPP.

"Broadway" Bill Lee from KPKE in Denver joined the station around Christmas 1986 as the youngest of the Hot Jocks. Rick Allen also joined as Production Director, in addition to being the voice of WQHT's electronic prizedroid Robojock, and TM Communications customized KPWR's "K-Power!" jingle package for WQHT under the name of "The Hot Streak!" with Chuck on rapping vocals.

By 1987, WQHT was making a name for itself by playing freestyle music in regular rotation. Artists such as Noel, Safire, The Cover Girls and TKA were made famous because they were played in heavy rotation right next to Mainstream Top 40 artists such as Exposé, Debbie Gibson and Taylor Dayne. Freestyle and club music from other cities such as Miami, who had (and continues to have) an active dance and club scene, wasn't ignored either. Company B and Tiger Moon, who were famous in the Florida club scene, were played on WQHT as well. In fact, Hot 103 pioneered custom station versions of songs, where the artists would change lyrics and sing about the station. Because of WQHT's success with the genre, WHTZ copied the station's success by adding a few Freestyle titles, as well as urban contemporary stations WBLS and WRKS, who were playing long versions of the records they played as well.

That same year, WQHT added a local weekly countdown show called New York's Hot Tracks, hosted by Bill Lee, which counted down the top 10 selling 12" singles of the week. The show started on Sunday nights, then moved to Fridays at 6 pm, and then later at 5 pm. It featured short interview clips and aired sonovox numbers produced by Rick Allen identifying the chart position. "Hot Tracks" was produced, for a time, by PD Joel Salkowitz and researched by Angie Martinez, who would later become an afternoon host after the station flipped to Hip-Hop and R&B in 1992. (The show would later be hosted by Jeff Thomas, and was cancelled in 1993).

In July 1987, WQHT wanted to devote some airtime to older dance music at the urging of Al Bandiero. Management agreed, and thus began "The Disco Classics' Showcase", which would feature dance music older than seven years. The show was broadcast for an hour from 8 pm-9 pm on Sundays. In 1989, the show was expanded to two hours. Later hosts would be Paco Navarro in 1992 from WKTU fame, and Freddie Colon. The show lasted until 1994.

==== Morning drive ====
From the time the station signed on the air, it presented a music intensive morning show with only two stopsets of commercials an hour. Mornings were first hosted by Rufus Hurt with news by Judy Hernandez (another hold over from WAPP, where she went by the name Judy Herron). After Hurt left, "Big John" Monds took over for him.

By the fall of 1987, WQHT was looking for a morning team to round out its dayparts. It settled on the veteran team of "Walton & Johnson & The Not Ready For Drive Time Players". The show didn't click, and was cancelled in a couple months.

In 1988, the station brought in the married morning team of Ron Stevens and Joy Grdnic from KSHE in St. Louis to handle morning drive. Stevens & Grdnic were unique as they were a male/female team rather than the usual male/male morning show. Veteran newsman J. Paul Emerson of KMEL's Morning Zoo was joined as the wild newsman with a tabloid type delivery. The station added traffic updates via Shadow Traffic and contracted with WNYW meteorologist Nick Gregory to provide live weather updates.

==== WQHT's big impact ====
In February 1987, Billboard created a new "Crossover 30" chart in response to WQHT and the rise in popularity of other CHR/Dance stations. The chart was based solely on airplay from stations that reported to it. Radio trade magazine "Radio and Records" created a similar chart and started reporting the weekly music adds by WQHT and others.

The impact of WQHT inspired Emmis to partner with Westwood One to create a weekly national dance music countdown called American Dance Traxx, which debuted the week of March 23, 1987. The show was groundbreaking as it presented the countdown in long music sweeps as opposed to the traditional 2-songs in a row followed by a commercial break. The 3-hour countdown was hosted by KPWR's Jeffrey Wyatt and produced by WQHT PD Joel Salkowitz. The show used the same music beds that were on WQHT and KPWR and featured short interviews with the artists of the day. The show aired on WQHT Sundays from 9 pm–midnight. After Jeff left both KPWR and Emmis, Deborah Rath was made the permanent host until former MTV VJ and host of "Club MTV" "Downtown" Julie Brown took over in 1992.

==== Hot Night concert series ====
In February 1987, the station introduced the "Hot Night" concert series. The concerts consisted of the top CHR/Dance artists of the day. Tickets for the concerts were only available to listeners, with the station giving them away. "Hot Night 1" was held February 4, 1987, at the Palladium and starred Sheila E. and The Cover Girls. Hot Night 2 was held at the same location, starring The Jets and Debbie Gibson.

As years went on, "Hot Night" got bigger and expanded to more exotic locations such as The Bahamas, on December 13, 1989, with "Hot Night in Paradise", featuring Pajama Party, Seduction, Noel, TKA, Young MC, Roxette, Expose and Stevie B., as well as Cancún. The last known "Hot Night" was in 1993, at the Palladium and starred SWV.

==== The Original Saturday Night Dance Party ====
In April 1987, WQHT debuted The Original Saturday Night Dance Party, live from 4D NightClub in Manhattan from 10 pm–2 am, with no commercials and limited interruption. All music from the show was live from the club as WQHT plugged right into the DJ booth mixer. Scotty Blackwell was the first DJ to spin for the show, where he would mix with 4 Technics 1200ML Turntables. There was even a cart machine on hand to play the sweepers over the air.

As time went on, WQHT was wired into two dozen different clubs around the area, including The Palladium, The Copacabana, Foxes, Emerald City, The Tunnel, Chicago, Limelight, 1018, The L.I. Exchange, and The Roxy.

Other notable club DJs such as Glenn Friscia, DJ Animal, Roman Ricardo, Freddie Bastone and Mojo Nicosia were on the turntables for The Saturday Night Dance Party. Artists such as France Joli, Safire, The Cover Girls and others would occasionally perform live on the radio and in the clubs.

=== WYNY (1988–1996) ===
The WYNY logo used from 1988 to 1996

On September 22, 1988, at 5:30 pm, WQHT changed frequencies, as Emmis acquired NBC's radio stations. Since Federal Communications Commission regulations at the time required that a company could only own one FM radio station in a market, Emmis sold the 103.5 frequency to Westwood One (which had also acquired the remnants of the NBC Radio Network). At the same time, they moved the format at 103.5 FM to the 97.1 FM frequency which they acquired from NBC, with WQHT becoming "Hot 97". As a result, WYNY, which was running a country music format at the 97.1 frequency prior to the sale, would move to 103.5 FM.

The station, now known as "Country 103.5", had mediocre ratings in their first few months at its new frequency. In 1989, when Westwood One launched "Pirate Radio" (a top 40/rock format) on KQLZ in Los Angeles, rumors were that if the format worked out well there, WYNY would switch to the format soon after. The format did well initially in Los Angeles, but ratings tanked quickly, so consideration for the change was ended by the spring of 1990. Even though rumors of a format change were always existent at the station, the country format remained. In 1993, the station would be sold to Broadcast Partners, whom were committed to keeping Country on WYNY. As a country station, Jim Kerr would be the station's morning show host from 1990 to 1993, while their airstaff included Dan Daniel, Randy Davis, Bill Rock, Ray Rossi, Lisa Taylor, Charlie Berger and Susan Browning.

In May 1995, Broadcast Partners opted to sell the station to Evergreen Media, and after a lot of speculation about the station's future, Evergreen confirmed in January 1996 that the station would be changing formats. On the final weekend that the station would play country music (which would be from February 2 to 4, 1996), the entire air staff said goodbye. WYNY ended local programming at 6 pm on February 4 with "The Dance" by Garth Brooks, followed by syndicated programming. After airing the syndicated After Midnite with Blair Garner show in the early morning hours of February 5 (which also ended with "The Dance"), the country music format was gone from the station, thus leaving New York City without a full-time country station. (Later that year, country would resurface on several suburban stations, one of which would get the WYNY calls, resurfacing in late 1998). Beginning at 6 am on February 5, WYNY began stunting by simulcasting sister stations across the country, the first being Rock-formatted WRCX Chicago. On February 6, at 6 am, the simulcasting switched to urban contemporary-formatted KKBT Los Angeles. On February 7, at 6 am, the simulcasting switched to talk-formatted WLUP-FM Chicago. On February 8, at 6 am, the simulcasting switched to AC-formatted KIOI San Francisco. On February 9, from 6 am to 6 pm, the simulcast switched to modern rock-leaning top 40 WXKS-FM Boston. At 6 pm, the simulcasting of sister stations ended.

=== WKTU (1996–present) ===
At 6 pm on February 9, 1996, WYNY switched its stunting to a heartbeat sound effect, promoting the launch of a new format coming the following day at noon. At that time, WKTU was relaunched on 103.5 FM with a dance-based CHR format; WKTU's first song was "Gonna Make You Sweat" by C+C Music Factory. The station went to number one in the Arbitron ratings in their first monthly ratings report with the new format. Drag performer RuPaul co-hosted mornings with Michelle Visage, Lisa Taylor and Freddie Colon around this period, further helping their ratings. Sean "Hollywood" Hamilton and Goumba Johnny made their debut at night, and after much success, were moved to mornings in January 1998. By 2002, the moderate amount of rap played on the station was gone and the station evolved into more of a rhythmic hot AC.

On May 31, 2006, WKTU announced that actress/comedian Whoopi Goldberg would become the station's new morning host, and that the station would serve as the flagship station for her syndicated morning show. Her show, which aired mostly on AC and Rhythmic outlets in the United States, especially those owned by WKTU's now-parent company Clear Channel Communications, began on July 31, 2006. The news of Goldberg being named 'KTU's new morning star, and the departures of popular afternoon drive DJ "Broadway" Bill Lee and late night hostess Jewelz in June 2006, led to talk that KTU might switch formats (some suspected an upbeat female targeted hot AC-type direction similar to sister station KBIG/Los Angeles) with Goldberg's arrival. WKTU management insisted that there were no plans to flip formats, even with Goldberg in mornings. Another surprise move was the reunion of former KTU morning hosts Sean "Hollywood" Hamilton and Goumba Johnny, who hosted afternoons on the station beginning September 5, 2006. Hamilton continues to host the syndicated shows the Weekend Top 30 and the Remix Top 30 heard in cites across America and around the world.

However, on September 9, 2006, after many format flips by Clear Channel of other radio stations throughout the country, WKTU took on the upbeat rhythmic AC direction by playing only popular current rhythmic material, as well as increasing the airplay of older rhythmic sounds such as soul, disco and freestyle.

On November 28, 2007, WKTU announced that it had dropped Whoopi's morning show. According to station management, the reason was due to Goldberg's duties on The View, although it may also have to do with the show's ratings. Her show continued to air in syndication through Premiere Radio Networks until April 18, 2008, when she called it quits. Paul "Cubby" Bryant, who served as Goldberg's co-host, left the syndicated show and returned to WKTU in January 2008 to host his own morning show.

Around 2009, WKTU did another tweak in their rhythmic AC format, dropping the older elements of dance music (disco and freestyle, including Judy Torres' "Freestyle Free For All" Sunday show; Torres has since returned to doing a Sunday afternoon shift at WKTU) and focusing mainly on a current direction, with mainstream dance and rhythmic music. The station pursued the advertiser-friendly demographic of people who are 25–54 years old, a move which has helped increase station ratings. In September 2010, the station returned to a rhythmic Top 40 direction, as WKTU was added to the Mediabase Rhythmic panel joining rival WQHT. On December 15, 2010, Goumba Johnny left WKTU after 15 years, leaving Hamilton solo in afternoons.

On April 4, 2011, WKTU was moved from the rhythmic CHR panel on Mediabase to CHR (Top 40), reflecting the recent evolution of the station's music to a more rhythmic adult contemporary direction again without disco/classic dance titles. At the same time, Nielsen BDS refrained from including WKTU's playlist on its Top 40/CHR panel because of its direction and having sister station WHTZ as a reporter, but the station did contribute to BDS' Dance/Mix Show Airplay panel due to having club music mix shows on the station up until August 16, 2014, when BDS added WKTU to the Top 40/CHR panel, with the inclusion of non-rhythmic titles.

On Memorial Day weekend 2014, WKTU started airing commercial free weekends, to compete with WBMP, which also started airing commercial free weekends after that station was relaunched as 92.3 AMP Radio. The commercial free weekends era on WKTU lasted until Labor Day weekend, 2014.

Despite its pop-leaning direction, WKTU has continued to embrace current dance product, even breaking new songs from the genre a lot quicker than its Top 40/CHR or rhythmic Top 40 counterparts.

== HD2 operation ==
WKTU began broadcasting in HD in late winter 2004. WKTU-HD1 duplicates the analog signal's Rhythmic AC format, while WKTU-HD2 originally broadcast country music similar to WYNY. On July 23, 2009, the country music format was dropped in favor of Pride Radio, a lifestyle format targeted to the LGBTQ community.

== Live events ==
Every August, WKTU holds an annual event called Beatstock. The event showcases artists from every dance genre, from disco to electronica, and is held at two locations in the New York area: Jones Beach Theater in Wantagh, New York and the PNC Bank Arts Center in Holmdel, New Jersey. The original KTU Beatstock concert, which took place in 1997, was an all-day event held at Floyd Bennett Field in Brooklyn, New York. It featured over 50 acts from various genres of dance music, all performing on one stage. For 2011, WKTU had decided to no longer sponsor the event; however, Beatstock continued for the year on Long Island at the Brookhaven Amphitheater on August 20. (That event was featured in The Real Housewives of New Jersey, episode 4.12 (July 15, 2012), as two of the cast members - Melissa Gorga and Teresa Giudice's daughter, Gia - performed there.)

In April 2012, WKTU announced a new concert event called KTUphoria. The all star concert event took place at the PNC Bank Arts Center in Holmdel, New Jersey on May 20, 2012, and, like Beatstock, was an all-day event featuring DJs and artists performing on one stage, albeit modified. On June 29, 2014, Ktuphoria was held at Izod Center with Jennifer Lopez, Calvin Harris, The Chainsmokers, Ariana Grande and Cash Cash.

== Notable personalities ==
- Hollywood Hamilton

== Former personalities ==
- Al Bandiero
- Carolina Bermudez
- Paul Cubby Bryant
- RuPaul
- Whoopi Goldberg
- Michelle Visage
