= KBEA-FM =

Coordinates: 41.606°N 90.993°W

- Muscatine, Iowa; United States
- Broadcast area: Quad Cities; Iowa City; Cedar Rapids
- Frequency: 99.7 MHz
- Branding: B-100

Programming
- Format: Contemporary hit radio
- Affiliations: Compass Media Networks; Premiere Networks

Ownership
- Owner: Townsquare Media; (Townsquare License, LLC)
- Sister stations: KIIK-FM, KJOC, WXLP

History
- First air date: January 21, 1949
- Former call signs: KWPC-FM (1949–1970); KFMH (1970–1994); KBOB (1994–2000)

Technical information
- Licensing authority: FCC
- Facility ID: 13666
- Class: C1
- ERP: 100,000 watts
- HAAT: 265 meters (869 ft)

Links
- Public license information: Public file; LMS
- Webcast: Listen live
- Website: b100quadcities.com

KBEA-FM (99.7 FM, "B100") is a commercial radio station licensed to Muscatine, Iowa, United States, and serving the Quad Cities, Iowa City and Cedar Rapids. Owned by Townsquare Media, it airs a contemporary hit format, with studios on North Brady Street in Davenport and transmitter in Wilton, Iowa.

== History ==
=== KWPC-FM (1949-1970) ===
The station signed on the air in January 21, 1949. Its original call sign was KWPC-FM, a sister station to KWPC 860 AM. Because the AM station was a daytimer, required to go off the air at night, KWPC-FM was able to continue programming after sunset. The stations simulcast most of the week and were owned by the Muscatine Broadcasting Company, with studios at Mulberry and Houser Streets.

By the 1960s, the stations stopped simulcasting. KWPC-FM aired an automated beautiful music format, playing instrumental cover versions of popular adult songs, along with Broadway and Hollywood show tunes.

=== KFMH (1970–1994) ===
As the beautiful music format began to age, the station took steps to make adjustments. In 1970, the station's call letters changed to KFMH, but easy listening music, a mix of instrumentals and soft vocals, continued on the frequency for three more years.

In June 1973, KFMH underwent a major format change. "Captain" Steve Bridges (a disc jockey who had worked at KSTT in Davenport) came in as program director (he later became a part-owner). The station began playing alternative rock, which had gained popularity on the West Coast among young radio listeners.

KFMH ("99 Plus" and "The Real FM" was how it was commonly known) soon gained a devoted, loyal audience, as the station played lesser-known and local artists in a variety of genres, including album rock, modern rock, jazz, blues and R&B. KFMH's disc jockeys included Andy Hammer, Kerry Peace, Lisa Catalona, Beth McBride, Chris Carson, Borderline Bob, Sean Tracy, Phil and Tom Maicke, Mary of the Heartland, Bob Just Bob, Dirty Judy, Jim Hunter, Roberto Nache, John Obvious, and Captain Steve played album cuts from popular artists. The station was known for pushing the envelope at times, but it also would change programming at a moment's notice (such as when word spread about the shooting death of John Lennon in 1980).

In 1981, John Flambo became the new owner and immediately removed the one-and-a-half-hour farm report morning show and replaced it with Andy Hammer and a format matching the rest of the day. "The Plus" became a pioneer on the FM radio dial with Kerry Peace hosting “Off the Beat n’ Track” presenting, alternative and punk rock not heard anywhere else.

The 1980s ended with many changes to the station; during this time, Kerry Peace left to become a record rep. In March 1990, KFMH began transmitting from its current 1,000-foot tower in Wilton, Iowa, powered at 100,000 watts. In 1993, KFMH's studios moved to Davenport, where it continued its alternative format for a year.

=== KFMH leaves the air ===
It ended its run at 3 p.m. on March 1, 1994, with the song "Your Move...I've Seen All Good People" by Yes, the song that began the rock format on June 4, 1973. On the night it signed off, about 500 people showed up outside the station to protest. Mercury Broadcasting inquired about moving the format to its WKBF 1270 AM, but the proposal never materialized.

In 2013, 19 years to the hour KFMH went off the air, "99 Plus KFMH" returned as an Internet-only station, with the original DJs Captain Steve, Tom Maicke, Jim Hunter, Roberto, and Mary of the Heartland. New DJs include Tommy Lang, Bill Klutho, and Patrick O'Leary. You can listen once again to Rock, Blues, Jazz, Reggae, and Alternative. 99pluskfmh.com is available on the TuneIn app, Simple Radio by Streema, and Sonos.

=== KBOB (1994–2000) ===
On March 16, 1994, the 99.7 MHz frequency was sold to New York-based Connoisseur Communications. Connoisseur changed the call letters to KBOB and its format to country music. The station became a competitor to the Quad Cities' country leader, 103.7 WLLR-FM. These changes outraged many loyal KFMH listeners, who feared there would no longer be a radio outlet for "alternative" music. Years after KFMH's demise, some fans still miss the station's eclectic blend of music and programming. Steve Bridges eventually moved to Iowa City where he purchased KCJJ 1630 AM, an AM station with a talk-music hybrid.

KBOB debuted to promising ratings. Part of what set the new station apart was inclusion of older country hits that WLLR had removed from its playlist. However, KBOB — which later was sold to Cumulus Media — soon languished behind WLLR-FM in the country music battle.

=== KBEA-FM "B100" (2000–present) ===
On March 30, 2000, KBOB moved to 104.9 MHz, replacing that frequency's adult contemporary format. FM 99.7 then flipped to its current Top 40 format. It began using "B100" branding. Robb Rose was the first program director and morning host along with Julia Bradley in the morning, Jeff James in middays, Steve Fuller in the afternoon drive time, Brandon Marshall in the evening and Rachel in overnights.

The station quickly gained a following, cutting into the ratings of the Quad Cities' dominant Top 40 station, "All-Hit 98.9" WHTS-FM. In early 2006, WHTS was sold to the Educational Media Foundation. The station's format was changed to Contemporary Christian, leaving "B100" as the only Top 40 station in the Quad Cities for the next six years. However, in February 2012, Clear Channel Communications (now iHeartMedia) launched a CHR format on KUUL-FM as "101.3 KISS FM."

On August 30, 2013, a deal was announced in which Townsquare Media would acquire 53 Cumulus stations, including KBEA-FM, for $238 million. The deal was part of Cumulus' acquisition of Dial Global. Townsquare and Dial Global were both controlled by Oaktree Capital Management. The sale to Townsquare was completed on November 14, 2013.
