= KJOC (FM) =

Radio station in Bettendorf, Iowa

- Bettendorf, Iowa; United States
- Broadcast area: Quad Cities
- Frequency: 93.5 MHz
- Branding: I-Rock 93.5

Programming
- Format: Active rock

Ownership
- Owner: Townsquare Media; (Townsquare License, LLC)
- Sister stations: KBEA-FM, KIIK-FM, WXLP

History
- First air date: July 4, 1984 (as KBQC)
- Former call signs: KBQC-FM (1984–1990); KGLR (1990); KQCS (1990–1995); KORB (1995–2004); KQCS (2004–2014)
- Call sign meaning: "Jock" (former sports format)

Technical information
- Licensing authority: FCC
- Facility ID: 19791
- Class: A
- ERP: 6,000 watts
- HAAT: 97 meters (318 ft)
- Transmitter coordinates: 41°36′14.1″N 90°24′44.5″W

Links
- Public license information: Public file; LMS
- Webcast: Listen live
- Website: irock935.com

KJOC (93.5 MHz) is a commercial FM radio station licensed to Bettendorf, Iowa, and serving the Quad Cities radio market. It broadcasts an active rock radio format, known as "I-Rock 93.5". KJOC is owned by Townsquare Media, with studios and offices on Brady Street in Davenport, Iowa.

KJOC has an effective radiated power (ERP) of 6,000 watts. Its transmitter is located on 205th Street in rural LeClaire in Scott County.

== History ==
=== Early years as KBQC-FM ===
The station signed on the air as KBQC-FM, on July 4, 1984. The call sign stood for "Bettendorf-Quad Cities". KBQC-FM first began broadcasting live from a bandshell in Middle Park, during the "Old Fashioned 4th of July" event staged by the city of Bettendorf. For several weeks prior to going live, the station had broadcast The Beatles' "Here Comes the Sun" continuously, as a teaser to the slogan of the station, "B-93, Where it's Always 93 and Sunny".

KBQC was Bettendorf's first licensed commercial FM radio station, and was built off an FCC construction permit issued in May 1983, after a contentious application process by several proposed owner/operators.

The prevailing party was Stromquist Broadcast Services, owned by Peter Stromquist, of Edina, Minnesota. Stromquist and his first hired employee, Barry Martin, originally from Joplin, Missouri, oversaw construction from the ground up, of the transmitting facilities in LeClaire, Iowa, and of the new studios and offices on State Street in downtown Bettendorf, located adjacent to Omeara's Pub. When the station premiered, Martin was known as "Martin in The Morning" and served as the host of morning drive time.

Stromquist sold his interest in the station in 1985 and went on to become VP/GM Europe Middle East, Africa for United Press International, CEO of ABC's radio division in Asia, and Director of Mainland China operations for the broadcasting division of Paris-based Hachette media.

Martin subsequently became the morning host of KVON in the San Francisco Bay Area for nearly 20 years, and later worked in public relations for local government.

=== The 1990s and early 2000s ===
The station underwent a number of format changes from the late 1980s through the mid-1990s. Formats included oldies as KGLR-FM and Christian rock as KQCS.

On March 14, 1995, the station, now under the KORB call letters, flipped to alternative rock as "Planet 93.5". From 1997 to 2000, the syndicated Howard Stern Show was broadcast in mornings. Following a day and a half of stunting, on March 23, 2000, KORB-FM flipped to active rock as "93 Rock".

The active rock format proved successful, with KORB becoming one of the highest rated stations in the Quad Cities for a few years. However, the ratings of sister station WXLP ("97X") were not as good, and it didn't help that the two shared somewhat similar formats. In April 2004, management decided to merge the two stations; the rock format become "97 Rock", while retaining the WXLP call letters. Following a week of simulcasting, on April 7, a Hot AC format took over the 93.5 frequency as "Star 93.5", and call letters were changed back to KQCS.

Despite being the only hot AC outlet in the Quad Cities market, and having 10 years to build a loyal following, "Star" struggled in the ratings. Year after year, it was among the lowest-rated FM stations in the market. "Star" featured "Intelligence for Your Life" hosted by John Tesh in the evenings, and carried the "Daily Dees" syndicated program hosted by Rick Dees. Local air talent included Melissa Martin and Steve Donovan.

On August 30, 2013, a deal was announced in which Townsquare Media would acquire 53 Cumulus Media stations, including KQCS, for $238 million. The deal was part of Cumulus' acquisition of Dial Global. Townsquare and Dial Global were both controlled by Oaktree Capital Management. The transaction was consummated effective November 14, 2013.

=== Sports radio ===
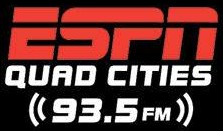
Logo as "ESPN 93.5"

On June 13, 2014, it was announced that on June 16, KQCS would flip to sports radio, partially simulcasting KJOC (1170 AM) and carrying ESPN Radio programming as ESPN 93.5. As a Hot AC station, KQCS registered just a 1.5 in the fall 2013 Arbitron ratings. A number of other changes were announced, including a local sports talk show and broadcasting of area high school games. KQCS became the Quad Cities' home for Chicago Cubs baseball, Chicago Bears football and Iowa State University sports. On July 9, 2014, KQCS changed its call letters to KJOC-FM to match the call sign on 1170 AM.

=== Return to rock ===
On August 30, 2019, the station flipped back to active rock after a 15-year absence, branded this time as "I-Rock 93.5". Concurrently, the sports format moved to KBOB, replacing classic country on that frequency. Despite no longer carrying sports, the KJOC call letters remain on 93.5.
