= WLTW =

Radio station in New York City

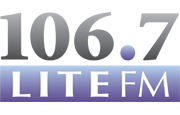
- New York, New York; United States
- Broadcast area: New York metropolitan area
- Frequency: 106.7 MHz (HD Radio)
- Branding: 106.7 Lite-FM

Programming
- Language: English
- Format: Adult contemporary
- Subchannels: HD2: iHeartRadio Broadway (show tunes)
- Affiliations: iHeartRadio; Premiere Networks

Ownership
- Owner: iHeartMedia; (iHM Licenses, LLC)
- Sister stations: WAXQ; WHTZ; WKTU; WOR; WWPR-FM; WWRL

History
- First air date: January 1, 1961
- Former call signs: WRVR (1961–1980); WKHK (1980–1984)
- Call sign meaning: Lite FM New York

Technical information
- Licensing authority: FCC
- Facility ID: 56571
- Class: B
- ERP: 6,000 watts (analog); 239 watts (digital)
- HAAT: 415 meters (1,362 ft)
- Transmitter coordinates: 40°44′54.3″N 73°59′8.5″W

Links
- Public license information: Public file; LMS
- Webcast: Listen live (via iHeartRadio)
- Website: litefm.iheart.com

WLTW (106.7 MHz) is a commercial radio station licensed to New York, New York and serving the New York metropolitan area. It airs an adult contemporary radio format, switching to Christmas music for part of November and December. Lite-FM is owned by iHeartMedia and broadcasts from studios at 125 West 55th Street in Midtown Manhattan, while the station's transmitter is located atop the Empire State Building.

== History ==
=== 1960s and 70s ===
The station first went on the air on January 1, 1961, as non-commercial WRVR, originally owned by the Riverside Church. WRVR played classical music and some jazz, along with religious programming and public affairs, broadcasting from an antenna atop the church's bell tower on Riverside Drive. As time went on, WRVR was a full-time jazz station with a loyal audience following but low ratings.

In mid-1974, Riverside Church looked to end the financial costs of running a radio station and decided to sell WRVR, but with a preferred condition that the station's jazz format be preserved. At the same time, classical music-formatted WNCN (104.3 FM, now sister station WAXQ) was in the process of a controversial format change to album oriented rock, with new call letters WQIV. A group of WNCN audience members formed the non-profit WNCN Listeners Guild and attempted to block the station's then-owner, Starr Broadcasting, from making the format switch. After their efforts failed, the WNCN Listeners Guild partnered with GAF Corporation and briefly entered negotiations with Riverside Church to purchase WRVR and switch its programming to classical. The rock format on 104.3 FM lasted less than a year, as GAF announced it would purchase WQIV in July 1975 and restore 104.3 FM to its former call sign and classical programming.

As the WNCN/WQIV drama concluded, Sonderling Broadcasting stepped in and bought WRVR from Riverside Church for just over $2 million. Sonderling already owned WWRL (1600 AM), and hoped that it could move that station's urban contemporary format to FM as a counter-move against WBLS (107.5 FM), which had cut into WWRL's ratings. Like the WNCN/WQIV situation, community opposition tried to stop sale of the station. Sonderling ultimately took control of WRVR in October 1976 after over a year of delays. Listener protests did prevent the proposed format change and WRVR remained a jazz station under Sonderling ownership. At that time it developed the precursor to what would later become known as the "smooth jazz" format. While it played jazz music, it was allowed to report to the Radio & Records Album Oriented Rock Chart in the mid to late 1970s.

=== 1980s ===
In 1978, Viacom announced it was purchasing the Sonderling chain. The sale took a year-and-a-half to become final. When Viacom took over in 1980, the call letters were changed to WKHK and the station adopted a country music format known as "Kick 106.7 FM". The format flip took place in the middle of the night and brought many protests from New York jazz fans, who petitioned the FCC to deny the station's FCC license renewal. Ultimately the petition was denied. WKHK suffered from low ratings, unable to cut into the lead of the already-established country station, WHN (1050 AM).

On January 23, 1984, Viacom dropped country music and turned 106.7 into a middle of the road (MOR) station. It got new call letters, WLTW, and an on-air branding of "Lite FM". Initially the playlist was easy listening but without the instrumentals that would be classified as "elevator music". It played several songs in a row with no interruptions and no talking over the music. At this point, the station played such artists as Barbra Streisand, Neil Diamond, Carole King, James Taylor, The Carpenters, Dionne Warwick, Kenny Rogers, Frank Sinatra, Andy Williams, Barry Manilow, Simon & Garfunkel, Nat King Cole, Carly Simon and The Fifth Dimension. The station also played softer songs from such artists as Elton John, Elvis Presley, Stevie Wonder, The Beatles, Michael Jackson, Linda Ronstadt and Billy Joel. The station would not play any current music except for new songs by artists who were already familiar to listeners of the station. With this format change, ratings did increase from previously low levels.

By the late 1980s, WLTW started to play songs from such contemporary artists as Whitney Houston, Madonna, Chicago, Foreigner, The Doobie Brothers and Bruce Springsteen. As other competing New York City stations changed their focus, Lite-FM stayed with a soft adult contemporary format, even though the station began phasing out songs from MOR artists such as Frank Sinatra, Barry Manilow and The Carpenters. At this point, the station's ratings were at or near the top compared with other New York City radio stations.

=== 1990s ===
By the mid-1990s, with WPAT-FM adapting a Spanish adult contemporary format, WPLJ adapting a hot adult contemporary format, and WMXV switching to a modern adult contemporary format, WLTW segued to a mainstream adult contemporary sound with a more uptempo direction than before. DJs began talking over song intros and the station phased out the majority of its soft adult contemporary material.

The station's logo used from 1995 to 2009

Chancellor Media acquired WLTW and the rest of Viacom's radio group in 1997. In 1999 Chancellor merged with Capstar to form AMFM, which retained WLTW. Finally, in 2000, AMFM merged with Clear Channel Communications, which became iHeartMedia in 2014.

=== 2000s ===
WLTW was simulcast nationwide on XM Satellite Radio from 2001 to the end of 2003, under the channel name "Lite". WLTW on XM was replaced by The Blend on February 2, 2004. In 2004, all XM music channels went commercial free, and WLTW was replaced with a unique-to-XM channel called Sunny, which had an easy listening format. Since then, Clear Channel has regained the right to air commercials on their XM music channels. Sunny then began carrying commercials, but was still exclusive to XM. After a few format tweaks, Sunny played soft oldies until it became The Pink Channel.

As part of Clear Channel's nationwide cost-cutting efforts, WLTW fired station veterans Bill Buchner (mornings) and J.J. Kennedy (evenings) on November 6, 2006. Buchner was replaced with Karen Carson, who co-hosted mornings with fellow WLTW staffer Christine Nagy. WLTW Program Director Jim Ryan denied these firings were part of the company's cost cutting that were going on at all the other Clear Channel stations in preparation for the company's conversion from the leveraged buyout that took the company from public to private ownership in 2006. Ryan said the moves were made to improve ratings.

The syndicated Delilah call-in and dedication show, distributed by the co-owned Premiere Networks, replaced Kennedy's local evening love songs show on November 20, 2006, bringing it to the full New York market for the first time. Prior to WLTW picking her show up, Delilah was only heard in outer portions of the New York market from stations in neighboring areas, such as WEZN-FM. In a departure from her normal format, Delilah Rene and her syndicator allowed Ryan to program the music on the WLTW's version of Delilah, instead of the selections that are sent to her other affiliates.

On April 2, 2007, just after April Fool's Day, WLTW removed the "Lite" branding and was simply known as "New York's 106.7". This probably took place in reaction to the "Lite" brand being associated with an older demographic turning away the younger listeners, as well as increased competition from the new Fresh 102.7. Later in 2007, the Lite-FM branding returned on the station. The station continues to call itself Lite-FM, even though WLTW plays such uptempo songs as "Livin' on a Prayer" by Bon Jovi and "Crazy" by Gnarls Barkley. By 2009, most of the hot AC content was toned down for competitor WWFS' (now WNEW-FM) shift from hot AC to adult contemporary. In 2011, WWFS switched panels to the hot adult contemporary panel from the adult contemporary panel on Nielsen BDS and later Mediabase, giving WWFS more format similarity to rival WPLJ (owned by Cumulus Media) rather than WLTW.

Further cost-cutting efforts by Clear Channel caused the departure of longtime station favorites Al "Bernie" Berstein and Valerie Smaldone in early 2008. It was also announced that Program Director Jim Ryan would exit as of May 2008. Chris Conley took over the Program Director position. Conley was a programming consultant with McVay Media and long-time programming veteran with years in the Adult Contemporary radio format. Conley had a successful tenure at WBEB B101 FM in Philadelphia. In addition to his programming duties at WLTW-FM, Conley also oversaw programming at sister station WKTU The Beat Of New York. Morgan Prue, winner of several Music Director of the Year Awards, stayed on as the station's Music Director and Assistant Program Director. Upon Prue's departure, to pursue a program directorship in Canada, Jill Kempton was named Assistant Program Director/Music Director. Kempton was later the program director of sister station WASH-FM in Washington DC. Cara Hahn took the Assistant Program Director role, while doing a similar job at New York sister station WHTZ.

=== 2010s ===
In May 2011, WLTW returned to XM Satellite Radio, with a full-time simulcast on Channel 13. However, station owner Clear Channel sold off its ownership stake in Sirius XM Radio during the second quarter of fiscal year 2013. As a result of the sale, nine of Clear Channel's eleven XM stations, including the simulcast of WLTW, ceased broadcast over XM Satellite Radio on October 18, 2013.

In 2018, WLTW and eight other iHeart-owned AC stations began carrying the syndicated Saturday morning program Ellen K Weekend Show. It is hosted by KOST 103.5 Los Angeles radio personality and former On Air with Ryan Seacrest co-host Ellen K. The program uses celebrity interviews and chats previously heard on Ellen K's Los Angeles wake up show during the week.

A link to 106.7 FM's days as Riverside Church-owned WRVR remains on WLTW in the present day. A recorded sermon from services the previous week at Riverside Church airs on the station at 5:00 am on Sunday mornings. It is part of WLTW's non-music public affairs programming.

=== Christmas Music ===
Like most other iHeartMedia-owned adult contemporary stations, during the holiday season, WLTW plays Christmas music, usually switching its playlist on the third Friday of November and the Friday before Thanksgiving at 5:00 p.m. ET. In its early years, after Thanksgiving, Lite-FM would mix in holiday songs to its playlist, increasing the number as Christmas grew closer and going with all Christmas music and reduced commercials on Christmas Eve and Christmas Day. In recent years, the Christmas music was "switched" in a special ceremony at Radio City Music Hall by the morning show hosts joined by The Rockettes and a celebrity guest prior to a performance of Christmas Spectacular Starring the Radio City Rockettes.

After the September 11 attacks, Christmas music was seen as a comforting "feel-good" format for radio listeners. Already established as a popular station for Christmas music, WLTW began to switch to an all-Christmas format earlier in 2002. After retaining its leadership in market share, and as part of a national trend, the station continued to make the switch earlier in the following years. By 2004, the all-Christmas format ran from Thanksgiving through Christmas, and in 2005, it began on November 18, the week before Thanksgiving (November 24). WLTW captured 7.4% of the New York radio audience during the fall of 2005, the biggest market share in WLTW's history and the highest share for all New York stations since the winter of 1995. On November 18, 2006, for the second year in a row, the station switched to all Christmas music on the Saturday before Thanksgiving, becoming the first station in the New York media market to do so. At some points during the 2008 holiday season, WLTW would draw as much as a third of all radio listeners in the New York area.

From 2007 to 2018, WLTW began airing Christmas music on the Friday before Thanksgiving, from 2019 to 2020, the station began airing Christmas music on the second Friday before Thanksgiving, and since 2021, the station returned to playing Christmas music on the Friday before Thanksgiving.

In 2025, WLTW opted to extend the Christmas music through December 28, contrary to previous years when the station would return to AC on December 26.

=== Ratings ===
As a mainstream adult contemporary station, WLTW has historically been one of the top radio stations in New York City, often listed as No. 1. In March 2012, the station finished first with a 7.5 share in the Nielsen Audio numbers, with WCBS-FM and WHTZ-FM finishing in second and third respectively.

WLTW's audience also grows when it switches to Christmas music for the holiday season. In 2017, the station's ratings share increased to 8.8 at the beginning of the season, an increase of .5-year-over-year.
