= KIIK-FM =

Radio station in DeWitt, Iowa

Coordinates: 41.720°N 90.570°W

- DeWitt, Iowa; United States
- Broadcast area: Quad Cities
- Frequency: 104.9 MHz
- Branding: US 104.9

Programming
- Format: Country
- Affiliations: Compass Media Networks

Ownership
- Owner: Townsquare Media; (Townsquare License, LLC)
- Sister stations: KBEA, KJOC, WXLP

History
- First air date: January 1977 (in Geneseo, Illinois, as WRSQ-FM)
- Former call signs: WRSQ-FM (1977–1980; WGEN-FM (1980–1998); KQLI (1998–2000); KBOB-FM (2000–2014); KQCS (2014–2016)
- Call sign meaning: a tribute to KIIK 104 when KIIK was at 103.7 FM; reference to former branding

Technical information
- Licensing authority: FCC
- Facility ID: 12234
- Class: C3
- ERP: 12,500 watts
- HAAT: 143 meters (469 ft)

Links
- Public license information: Public file; LMS
- Webcast: Listen live
- Website: us1049quadcities.com

KIIK-FM (104.9 MHz) is a commercial radio station located in DeWitt, Iowa, broadcasting to the Quad Cities area. Established in 1977 as WRSQ-FM, KIIK-FM is owned by Townsquare Media and broadcasts a country music format. Studios are located in Davenport, with a transmitter located near Eldridge, Iowa.

== History ==
=== WGEN-FM ===
The Quad Cities allocation for 104.9 MHz dates to 1977, when the city of license was Geneseo, Illinois. The station signed on as WRSQ-FM, the FM sister station of WGEN (1500 kHz). The station aired country music, along with community and farm news, local sports and St. Louis Cardinals baseball. The call letters were changed to WGEN-FM on October 6, 1980.

In 1996, both WGEN and WGEN-FM were sold to Connoisseur Communications, owner of KJOC, KORB, WXLP and KBOB. For a time, the FM station was a repeater of KJOC's AM signal, while the AM signal was a simulcast of KBOB (at the time, located at 99.7 FM). By 1997, ownership of the AM and FM frequencies were split, and Connoisseur moved the city of license to DeWitt, Iowa; a new transmitter tower was built near Long Grove (about 7 miles south of DeWitt), and the studios were moved to Davenport in anticipation of its first new format under the new ownership.

=== Lite 104.9 FM-KQLI (1998–2000) ===
KQLI employed an adult contemporary format at 104.9 for about two years, starting on March 17, 1998. However, the station had minimal listenership, primarily due to its small coverage area and competition from the more powerful KMXG-FM.

=== First country era (2000–2007) ===
In March 2000, when KQLI and sister stations KBOB, WXLP, KORB, and KJOC were sold to Cumulus Media, plans were already being formulated to revamp several of the company's radio stations, including 104.9 FM. The plan involved dropping KQLI's adult contemporary format and moving KBOB's country format from 99.7 FM to 104.9 FM, as 99.7 FM flipped to Top 40/CHR as "B100". The switch occurred on March 30, 2000.

KBOB's modern country format, in use since it began in March 1994, remained the same until November 2001, when the station adopted a classic country format under the slogan "Great Country 105". Although "Great Country 105" had a loyal audience (as it played songs from artists such as George Jones and Merle Haggard), the ratings remained low.

On March 31, 2005, the station switched back to a modern country format, branding itself "The River 104.9", but listenership remained near the bottom of the Quad Cities market's ratings.

=== Rock 104-9 (2007–2014) ===
On March 5, 2007, Cumulus moved WXLP's modern rock format to 104.9 FM as "Rock 104-9". Included with the switch was WXLP's "Dave and Darren in the Morning" radio show. Other on-air personalities included Bill Stage and Sean. The station also aired syndicated shows hardDrive and The House of Hair with Dee Snider. In addition to its music programming, KBOB broadcast Chicago Bears football games from 2007 to 2013.

On August 30, 2013, a deal was announced in which Townsquare Media would acquire 53 Cumulus stations, including KBOB-FM, for $238 million. The deal was part of Cumulus' acquisition of Dial Global; Townsquare and Dial Global are both controlled by Oaktree Capital Management. The sale to Townsquare was completed on November 14, 2013.

=== Return to country (2014–2016) ===
On July 9, 2014, at 6 a.m., after playing "Brain Stew" and "Jaded", both by Green Day, KBOB began stunting with Christmas music. At noon, the station flipped back to country as "104.9 The Hawk", launching with 10,000 songs in a row, with the first being "Drink to That All Night" by Jerrod Niemann. At the same time, the callsign was changed to KQCS.

=== KIIK 104.9 (2016–2021) ===
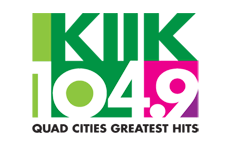
"KIIK 104.9" logo (2016–2021)

"The Hawk" failed to take listeners from rival WLLR, garnering a mere 2.0 in the last Arbitron ratings under the country format for July 2016, miles behind WLLR's 18.1 rating. On August 29, the station began stunting with songs with the word "talk" in the title, before debuting a classic hits format on August 31 as "The New KIIK 104.9". The first (and ultimately, last) song played under the new format was "Eye of the Tiger" by Survivor. On the same day as KQCS' flip, WYEC, an oldies-leaning station, dumped its format for adult hits, meaning that KQCS would have no direct classic hits/oldies competitor in the Quad Cities market, although KMXG, an adult contemporary station, had (at the time) devoted its weekend programming to music of the 1970s, the 1980s, and the 1990s.

The station changed its call letters to KIIK-FM on September 7, 2016.

=== US 104.9 (2021–present) ===
On September 24, 2021, at 9:54 a.m., KIIK-FM abruptly dropped the classic hits format and played "The River" by Garth Brooks, followed by "God Bless America". At 10 a.m., the station flipped back to country, this time branded as "US 104.9". The relaunch of the format began with "5,000 songs in a row", starting with "When It Rains It Pours" by Luke Combs.
