= KBOB (Iowa) =

- Davenport, Iowa; United States
- Broadcast area: Quad Cities
- Frequency: 1170 kHz
- Branding: ESPN Quad Cities

Programming
- Format: Sports
- Affiliations: ESPN Radio

Ownership
- Owner: Townsquare Media; (Townsquare License, LLC)
- Sister stations: KBEA-FM; KIIK-FM; KJOC; WXLP

History
- First air date: July 7, 1946
- Last air date: February 28, 2025
- Former call signs: KSTT (1946–1984); KKZX (1984–1987); KSTT (1987–1993); KJOC (1993–2014)

Technical information
- Facility ID: 13662
- Class: B
- Power: 1,000 watts
- Transmitter coordinates: 41°23′21.13″N 90°31′0.48″W
- Translator: 104.1 K281DB (Davenport)

Links
- Webcast: Listen live
- Website: espnquadcities.com

KBOB was a radio station licensed to Davenport, Iowa. The station's frequency was 1170 kHz, and broadcast at a power of 1 kW. Its transmitter was in Knoxville Road just outside of Milan, Illinois. KBOB was owned by Townsquare Media, with studios located on Brady Street in Davenport.

The station went on the air in 1946 as KSTT. It was the Quad Cities' top 40 station from the mid-1950s until 1986, changing its call sign to KKZX in 1984. It then became an easy listening station, before returning to the KSTT call sign as part of a 1987 change to oldies. The station simulcast WXLP from 1989 until becoming a sports radio station in 1992; it became KJOC in 1993. KJOC moved to a talk radio format in 2003, and an oldies format in 2008. After Cumulus Media swapped its Quad Cities stations to Townsquare Media in 2013, the station briefly returned to sports in 2014; when that format and the KJOC call sign moved to 93.5 FM later that year, this station became classic country station KBOB. The sports format again returned to the station in 2019, remaining until Townsquare shut down KBOB in 2025.

== History ==
The station signed on July 7, 1946, as KSTT, broadcasting from the Hotel Davenport in downtown Davenport. Format was typical of the era, with big band and vocal pop, along with news, sports and farm markets.

It was not until the mid-1950s—when it began playing the then-new Top 40 genre—that the station really took off in popularity. Disc jockeys made liberal use of listener requests and call-in contests. If there was a live broadcast or news happening in the Quad Cities, listeners were sure to spot the "Big Red" mobile news cruiser. KSTT also polled listeners on their favorite current songs, which disc jockeys then presented in a weekly countdown program. Quad Cities area servicemen in Vietnam had tapes of KSTT programming sent to them.

The station, which moved in 1963 to 1111 East River Drive in downtown Davenport, had a large window in its studio, where motorists could see their favorite on-air disc jockeys broadcasting. Listeners today remember such radio personalities as Jay Gregory, Mike Kenneally, Michelle Coleman, Tom Clay, Bill Young, Greg Garron, Bryan Bradford, Dave Shropshire, Lou Gutenberger, Bobby Rich, Bob Bateman, Ruth & Fred, "Spike @ the Mic" O'Dell and Jim O'Hara, each of them presenting the current Top 40 hits in an entertaining way. Members of the station's news department included News Director Jerry Reid and reporters Dave Douglas (Tom Hosmanek), Gary Hummel, Paulee Lipsman, John Cloghssey, Dan Kennedy, Dan Potter, Jack Gabor, David McAlary & Fred Manfra.

KSTT listeners became participants as well as listeners, phoning in news tips, requesting songs. They attended KSTT-sponsored "hootenannys", sock-hops, "Smallstars" basketball games, picnics, concerts and "Good Guy-A-Go-Go" dances & contests. Dick Orkin's infamous "Chicken Man" a radio series and "The Tooth Fairy" another radio series episodes were heard daily.

For many years, KSTT remained the top-rated station in the Quad Cities market. But by the late 1970s and early 1980s, KSTT's audience started to shrink. In August 1984, KSTT changed callsigns to KKZX, known to listeners as "11-KZX", and took one last-ditch effort at Top 40 music and had mild success. In early 1986, KKZX flipped to easy listening until 1987. After Guy Gannett Broadcasting sold the station as well as its sister station 97X to Goodrich Broadcasting, the station returned to its legendary KSTT call letters, but began programming oldies from the 1950s through early 1970s, airing many of the same songs it played in its heyday. It worked for a while, but the resurgence was temporary.

Beginning in January 1989, KSTT was doing some simulcasting with sister FM station WXLP. By February 1992, 1170 AM's format was largely sports talk. In March 1993, the station's call letters were switched to KJOC.

During its 10-year run as a sports station, KJOC received most of its programming from ESPN Radio, and was the Quad Cities outlet for Chicago-area professional sports, including the Chicago Bears, Chicago Bulls, Chicago Cubs and the Chicago White Sox. For most of the 1990s, KJOC also provided coverage of local sports.

In April 2003, KJOC adopted a talk radio format. Branding itself as "Super Talk 1170", KJOC's flagship program was The Radio Factor hosted by Bill O'Reilly. Chicago-area sports remained a fixture on the station.

On August 20, 2008, KJOC switched to an oldies format, getting most of its programming from ABC Radio Networks' "True Oldies Channel". The sports lineup continued to feature Chicago-area and Iowa State University sports.

On February 20, 2012, KUUL dropped their longtime oldies format and switched to a Top 40, which temporarily left KJOC as the lone oldies station in the Quad Cities shortly after KUUL's switch, WYEC ("Rewind 93.9") began emphasizing its oldies format, which it had adopted some time earlier. KJOC's "True Oldies Channel" service focused on 1960s and 1970s music, while WYEC largely played music from the 1970s and 1980s plus some from the 1960s.

=== New owners and more format switches ===
On August 30, 2013, a deal was announced in which Townsquare Media would acquire 53 Cumulus Media stations, including KJOC, for $238 million. The deal was part of Cumulus' acquisition of Dial Global; Townsquare and Dial Global were both controlled by Oaktree Capital Management. The transaction was consummated effective November 14, 2013.

The format switched back to sports – a format last at 1170 AM 11 years earlier – on May 1, 2014, once again getting network programming from ESPN Radio.

On June 16, 2014, sister station KQCS (93.5 FM) began simulcasting KJOC's AM signal, as part of a planned format change – from hot adult contemporary to sports – at that frequency. The call letters were switched to KBOB (the letters formerly held by a sister station at 104.9 FM) on July 1, but initially continued to simulcast the sports talk format with 93.5, which took on the KJOC call sign.

On September 8, 2014, a new classic country music format debuted at 1170 AM, with programming from Westwood One. The station was slated to begin carrying reports from the Iowa Agribusiness Radio Network by mid-September. Initial plans were to continue carrying Iowa State University sports events and local high school sports, as the station had done in the past; Chicago Cubs games were to remain at 1170 AM until the 2015 season, at which time they were to begin being carried on 93.5 FM. It was the first time 1170 AM carried a country music format full time, and marked the first-time local agriculture reports were available on a Quad Cities radio station since 2004.

In January 2015, it was announced that KBOB would become the radio broadcaster for the Quad Cities River Bandits; a Class-A Minor League Baseball team which is the Midwest League affiliate of the Houston Astros. As KSTT and KJOC, the station previously aired the team's games from 1988 to 1996 before losing the broadcast rights to cross-market competitor WKBF in 1997. (Note: The Quad Cities River Bandits were known as the Quad City Angels from 1988 to 1991 and the Quad City River Bandits from 1992 to 1996.)

On August 30, 2019, the sports talk format returned to KBOB from KJOC, which flipped to active rock.

On February 28, 2025, KBOB ceased operations, as part of an ongoing series of closures of underperforming Townsquare Media stations. The KBOB license was surrendered in July 2025. It was cancelled on July 17, 2025.

== Translator ==
Call sign	Frequency	City of license	FID	ERP (W)	Class	Transmitter coordinates	FCC info
K281DB	104.1 FM	Davenport, Iowa	202259	250	D	41°31′58.5″N 90°34′24.8″W	LMS

As K281DB was authorized as a new translator during an AM revitalization window, it was obligated to be permanently associated with KBOB; its license was surrendered concurrently with KBOB in July 2025.
