= List of people in chiropractic =

This is a list of people in the chiropractic profession, comprising chiropractors and other people who have been notably connected with the profession. Many are important to the development or practice of chiropractic; they do not necessarily have DC degrees.

== A ==
- Seun Adigun, DC: Olympic athlete for Nigeria

== B ==
- Obie Baizley, DC: Manitoba, Canada, Politician

== C ==
- Colin Carrie, DC: Member, House of Commons of Canada
- Terry Chimes, DC: English musician
- Clinton Clauson, DC: Governor of Maine
- Franco Columbu, DC: bodybuilder and friend of Arnold Schwarzenegger.

== D ==
- Ruby Dhalla, DC: Member, House of Commons of Canada

== G ==
- Martin Gallegos, DC: California Assemblyman
- Jean-Robert Gauthier, DC: Member, House of Commons of Canada
- Clarence Gonstead, DC: expanded upon BJ Palmer's early 1920 ideas for chiropractic practice which later bore his name.
- George Goodheart, DC: developer of "Applied Kinesiology", and 1st US Olympic Team DC.
- Gary Goodyear, DC: Member, House of Commons of Canada

== H ==
- Suzanna Hupp, DC: Texas State Representative
- Tom Hyde, DC: American Chiropractor who was Team USA, Doctor for the 1987 Pan Am Games, and the 8th Chiropractor to be selected to work at the US Olympic Training Center in Colorado Springs.

== I ==
- Teddy Infuhr, DC: child actor
- William Ivens, DC: Member, Manitoba, Canada Legislature

== J ==
- Joseph Janse, DC: helped found the independently chartered Council on Chiropractic Education (CCE). As President of National College, (now known as National University of Health Sciences), he led the institution to become the first chiropractic college to achieve federally recognized status. He was also a renowned anatomist, and established the Journal of Manipulative and Physiological Therapeutics.

== K ==
- Joseph C. Keating, Jr., PhD: (1950–2007) trained as a clinical psychologist who spent the majority of his life teaching and researching the chiropractic profession. He is best known for his published works as a historian of chiropractic.

== L ==
- Jonathan Leary, DC: chiropractor, concierge wellness doctor, founder and CEO of Remedy Place, “the world’s first social wellness club."
- Jack LaLanne, DC: TV Personality, Body Builder, Inventor, Entrepreneur, Fitness and Nutrition Advocate
- James Lunney, DC: Member Parliament of Canada

== M ==
- Karyn Marshall, DC: an Olympic weightlifter
- Tom Mason, DC: actor
- Volney Mathison, DC: inventor
- Terrence Murphy (chiropractor), DC: New York State Senator

== P ==
- B.J. Palmer, DC: son of D.D. Palmer.
- D.D. Palmer, DC: founder of what we currently think of as chiropractic during the end of the 19th century.
- Mabel Heath Palmer, DC: first woman in Chiropractic, B.J. Palmer's wife, became a doctor of chiropractic in 1905.
- James W. Parker, DC: Founder of the Parker College of Chiropractic.
- Jim Pankiw, DC: former member of the Parliament of Canada

== S ==
- Shemi Sagiv, DC: Israeli Olympic marathoner
- Doug Sharp, DC: Olympic Bobsledder
- Shawn Stasiak, DC: WWF wrestler

== T ==
- Robert N. Thompson, DC: Canadian politician
- Ron Tripp, DC: a World Sambo Champion

== W ==
- Sid E. Williams, DC: founder of Life University
- Nell K. Williams, DC: chiropractor, co-founder of Life University, and the wife of the Dr. Sid E. Williams
