= Delta Sigma Chi =

American chiropractic fraternity

- ΔΣΧ
- Founded: July 14, 1913; 112 years ago Palmer College of Chiropractic
- Type: Professional
- Affiliation: PFA
- Status: Active
- Emphasis: Chiropractic
- Scope: International
- Pillars: Service, Brotherhood, Accomplishment, Intelligence, Wisdom, Strength, Commitment
- Colors: Red and Blue
- Mascot: Wyvern
- Chapters: 8 (active)
- Members: 5,000+ lifetime
- Headquarters: 7911 Warren Drive NW; Gig Harbor, Washington 98335; United States
- Website: www.deltasigmachi.org

Delta Sigma Chi (ΔΣΧ) is an American fraternal organization for professionals in the area of Chiropractic. (Note: Delta Sigma Chi may also refer to a non-affiliated Latino, multicultural sorority formed in 1996 at the NYC College of Technology. It had been a founding member of the NMGC and is now independent. There is a 2-chapter co-ed Latino fraternity with this same name, but it is independent of the others. Finally, there is a 60+ year old local fraternity at Heidelberg University in Ohio, using this name.)

== History ==
In 1913, there were three chiropractic schools in Davenport, Iowa: the Palmer School of Chiropractic, Universal College of Chiropractic, and the Davenport College of Chiropractic. On July 4 of that year, a group of chiropractic students representing those schools held an Independence Day picnic at Credit Island. Within this large group, a smaller group of friends discussed the subject of a chiropractic Greek letter fraternity.

On July 13, 1913, the first meeting of the fledgling organization took place, which is now the celebrated birth of the legacy of Delta Sigma Chi. Its twelve charter members were William E. Bender, Harry D. Cummings, J. E. Cummins, Arthur D. Daxie, Lynn H. Gearhart, J. Dudley Hills, Harold A. Hughes, S. E. Julander, A. C. McCrea, John H. Reardon, John R. Walsh, and Charles E. Weyland.

At that meeting, the founder completed plans for a Greek letter professional chiropractic fraternity by electing temporary officers and appointing a committee to draft a constitution and bylaws. Hughes served as its first president. The charter membership was limited to twelve men; however, the membership was opened and extended to twenty.

On November 6, 1913, B. J. Palmer was initiated into the brotherhood of Delta Sigma Chi. Five years later, Palmer was elected the honorary president of the fraternity. Delta Sigma Chi promotes straight unadulterated chiropractic principles, as set forth by B. J. Palmer. In addition, its members promote good fellowship and brotherhood as well as brotherly feeling amongst chiropractors, schools, and students.

Beta chapter was later added at Eastern College in Newark, New Jersey. This was followed by Gamma chapter at Texas Chiropractic College. By August 1921, Alpha chapter had 2,050 members, Beta had 200 members, and the newly created Gamma and Delta had 25 members each. When it celebrated its 38th anniversary in July 1951, the fraternity had 5,000 members. The fraternity has reprinted nine of B. J. Palmer's original books.

Today, the fraternity has a membership of several thousand individuals all around the globe, who continue to guard the sacred trust of chiropractic. Its national headquarters is located at Gig Harbor, Washington.

== Symbols ==
The name Delta Sigma Chi (DSC) stands for Doctors of Straight Chiropractic. Its values or pillars are Service, Brotherhood, Accomplishment, Intelligence, Wisdom, Strength, and Commitment. Its colors are red and blue.

The fraternity's pledge pin is a blue and gold inverted pentagram with the Greek letters ΔΣΧ above a Wyvern, a mythical creature. The wyvern was incorporated in the Palmer family crest shown on page 55 of The Science of Chiropractic’ (Green Book Volume I by B. J. Palmer. It is also used as the crest of the fraternity's coat of arms.

== Chapters ==
Following is an incomplete list of Delta Sigma Chi chapters. Active chapters are indicated in bold. Inactive chapters and institutions are in italics.

| Chapter | Charter date and range | Institution | Location | Status | Ref. |
|---|---|---|---|---|---|
| **Alpha** | July 18, 1913 | Palmer School of Chiropractic | Davenport, Iowa | Active | (Note: Chapter started at three campuses, originally including Universal College of Chiropractic and the Davenport College of Chiropractic) (Note: See J. Monroe Parker–Ficke House) |
| Beta | c. 1918 | Eastern College | Newark, New Jersey | Inactive | |
| Gamma | October 8, 1921 | Texas Chiropractic College | San Antonio, Texas | Inactive | |
| Delta | 1921 | Standard College of Chiropractic | New York | Inactive | |
| Epsilon | 1921 | Missouri Chiropractic College | St. Louis, Missouri | Inactive | |
| | | Palmer School of Chiropractic | St. Louis, Missouri | Inactive | |
| | | Eastern Chiropractic College | New York City, New York | Inactive | |
| | Before 1946 | Texas A&I College | Kingsville, Texas | Inactive | |
| Kappa | June 13, 1970 | Logan College of Chiropractic | Chesterfield, Missouri | Inactive | |
| **Lambda** | January 1976 | Life University | Marietta, Georgia | Active | |
| **Mu** | 1984–19xx ?; October 2019 | Parker University | Dallas, Texas | Active | |
| **Nu** | January 1992 | Life Chiropractic College West | Hayward, California | Active | |
| Xi | October 4, 2010 | Palmer College of Chiropractic Florida Campus | Port Orange, Florida | Inactive | |
| **Omicron** | July 4, 2014 | Sherman College of Chiropractic | Spartanburg, South Carolina | Active | |
| **Pi** | | German Chiropractic College | Dresden, Germany | Active | |
| **Rho** | December 5, 2020 | Cleveland University | Overland Park, Kansas | Active | |
| **Omega** | March 19, 2017 | Alumni chapter | | Active | |

== Chapter houses ==
The Alpha chapter's Victorian-style mansion is known as the J. Monroe Parker-Ficke House. Construction began in 1881 and was finished three years later, with 43 rooms. The fraternity purchased the building and its furnishings in 1978. It was placed on the National Register of Historic Places in 1983. It is located at 1208 Main Street in Davenport, Iowa.

== Notable members ==
- Clarence Gonstead, chiropractor known for the Gonstead technique
- Edgar Howard (honorary), lieutenant governor of Nebraska and the United States House of Representatives
- Thomas Morris (honorary), lieutenant governor of Wisconsin
- B. J. Palmer, the "developer" of chiropractic and president of Palmer School of Chiropractic

== See also ==
- Professional fraternities and sororities
