= Silver (disambiguation) =

Silver is a chemical element with symbol Ag and atomic number 47.

Silver may also refer to:

== Other common meanings ==
- Silver (color)
- Silver (household), dishware, cutlery and other items made of silver
- Silver medal, an award given to the runner-up of contests

== Arts and entertainment ==
=== Books ===
- Pirates of the Caribbean: Jack Sparrow: Silver, a prequel novel in the Pirates of the Caribbean franchise
- Silver, a 2019 crime novel by Chris Hammer
- Silver (Motion novel), a sequel to Treasure Island by Andrew Motion
- Silver (poetry collection), a 2024 poetry collection by Rowan Ricardo Phillips

=== Film and TV ===
- Silver (film), a 1999 Japanese film
- Silver (TV channel), a former Scandinavian TV channel screening movies

=== Video games ===
- Silver (video game), a 1999 game for the PC and Dreamcast
- Pokémon Silver, a game for the Game Boy

=== Fictional characters ===
- Judge Silver, in the Judge Dredd comic strip
- Long John Silver, main antagonist of Robert Louis Stevenson's novel Treasure Island
- Silver, the Lone Ranger's horse
- Silver, a Peale's falcon from the game Angry Birds 2
- Silver (comics), a fictional mutant character in Marvel Comics
- Silver (90210), a fictional character on the television series 90210
- Silver the Hedgehog, a psychic character in the Sonic the Hedgehog series

== Music ==
- Silver (band), an American 1970s country-rock band
- Silver (concert), a 2012 music concert by Filipina singer Regine Velasquez
- Silver (Boiled in Lead album), 2008
- Silver (Johnny Cash album), 1979
- Silver (Cheap Trick album), 2001
- Silver (Cliff Richard album), 1983
- Silver (Moist album), 1994
- Silver (Say She She album), 2023
- Silver (Starflyer 59 album), 1994
- Silver (The Wrens album), 1994
- Silver, an album by 7th Heaven
- Silver, an album by Fourplay, 2015
- Silver (Jesu EP), 2006
- Silver, an EP by Minuit, 1999
- "Silver" (Echo & the Bunnymen song)
- "Silver" (DMA's song)
- "Silver", a song by the Pixies on the album Doolittle (1989)

== People ==
- Silver (given name)
- Silver (surname)

== Places ==
- Silver, Manitoba, Canada, an unincorporated community
- Silver Islet, Ontario, Canada
- Silver Township, Cherokee County, Iowa, United States
- Silver Township, Carlton County, Minnesota, United States
- Silver, Texas, United States, an unincorporated community
- Silver City (disambiguation)
- Silver Creek (disambiguation)
- Silver Lake (disambiguation)

== Structures ==
- Silver Bridge, over the Ohio River
- Silver Center of Arts and Sciences, New York University
- Silver Stadium, a former baseball stadium in Rochester, New York

== Transportation ==
- Silver Airways, a United States–based regional airline
- Silver Line (MBTA), a Massachusetts public transport route
- Silver Line (Washington Metro), a planned public transport route
- Back Bone Silver, a French paramotor design

== Other uses ==
- Silver Party, an 1892–1911 U.S. political party
- Silver Pictures, a film production company founded by Joel Silver
- Operation Silver (1949), wire-tapping of the Soviet Army headquarters in Vienna
- Operation Silver (2007), a British-led operation against Taliban forces in Afghanistan

== See also ==
- Ag (disambiguation)
- Sliver (disambiguation)
- Silvers (disambiguation)
- Silva (disambiguation)
- Sylva (disambiguation)
