= Sylva =

Sylva may refer to:

== Arts and entertainment ==
- Sylva (Snarky Puppy album), 2015
- Sylva, or A Discourse of Forest-Trees and the Propagation of Timber, a 1664 work by John Evelyn
- Sylva, a 1960 novel by Jean Bruller

== People ==
=== People with the given name ===
- Sylva Ashworth (1874–1958), American chiropractor
- Sylva Kelegian (born 1962), American actress
- Sylva Koscina (1933–1994), Italian actress
- Sylva Langova (1921–2010), Czech actress
- Sylva Lauerová (born 1962), Czech writer and poet
- Sylva Macharová (1893–1968), Czech nurse
- Sylva Stuart Watson (1894–1984), British theatre manager
- Sylva Zalmanson (born 1944), Soviet-born Jewish activist, artist and engineer

=== People with the surname ===
- Buddy DeSylva (1895–1950), American songwriter
- Carmen Sylva (1843–1916), German writer and poet, nom de plume of Elisabeth of Wied, queen consort of Romania
- Marguerite Sylva (1875–1957), Belgian mezzo-soprano
- Rene Sylva (1929–2008), American botanist
- Timipre Sylva (born 1964), Nigerian politician
- Tony Sylva (born 1975), Senegalese footballer
- Vincent Da Sylva (born 1973), Senegalese basketball player

== Places ==
- Sylva, North Carolina, U.S.
- Sylva (river), Russia
- Sylva, Perm Krai, Russia
- Lake Sylva, on the campus of The College of New Jersey, U.S.

== Other uses ==
- Sylva Autokits, a British kit car manufacturer
- Sylva Foundation, a British tree and forestry charity

== See also ==
- Silva (disambiguation)
- Sylvanian Families, a line of collectible anthropomorphic animal figures made of flocked plastic
