= Jacob Goering House =

Historic house in Iowa, United States

- U.S. National Register of Historic Places
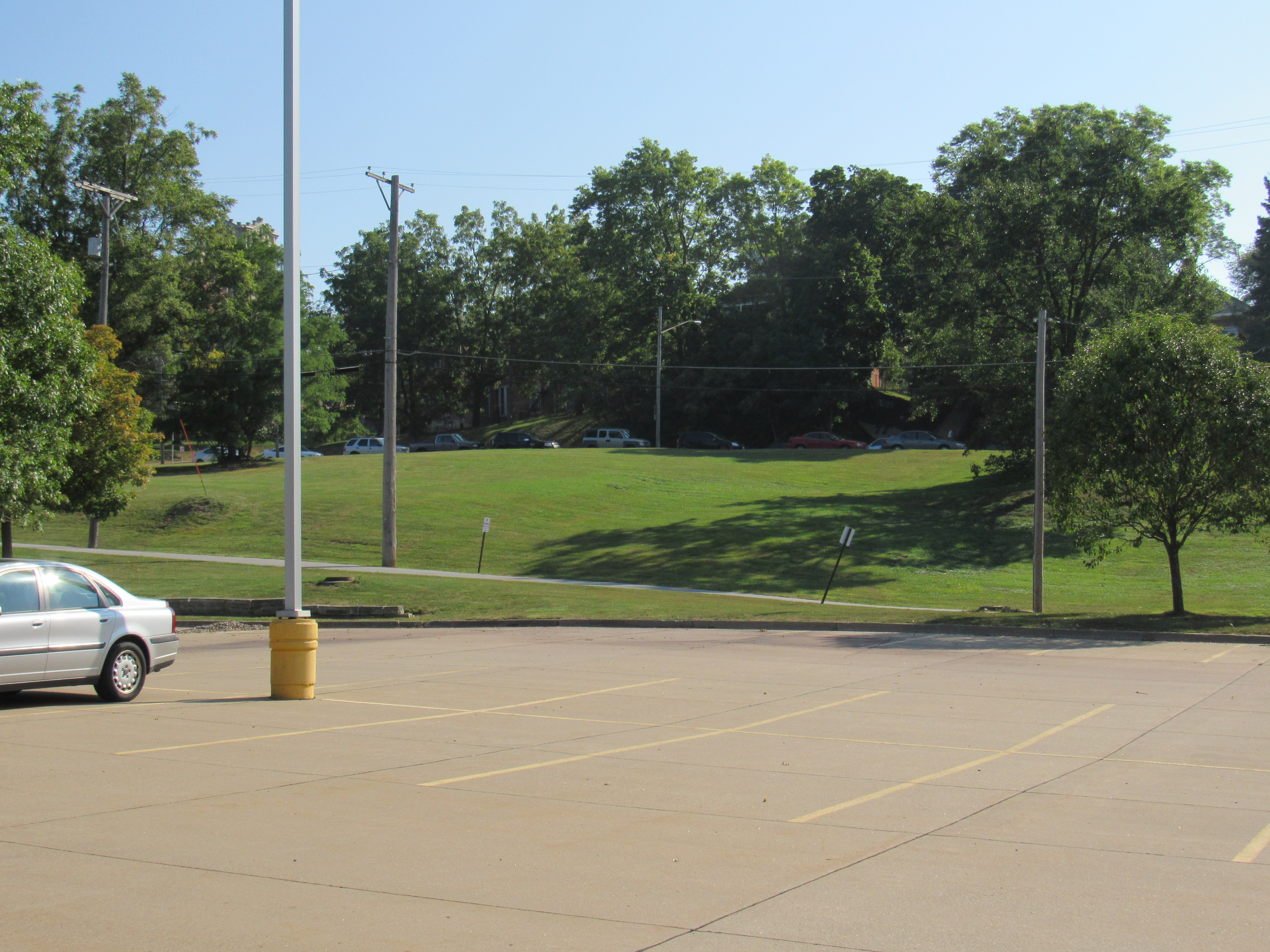
- The house was located on what is now a parking lot.

- Location within Iowa Location within the United States
- Location: 721 Harrison St. Davenport, Iowa
- Coordinates: 41°31′39″N 90°34′37″W
- Area: less than one acre
- Built: c. 1865-1870
- Architectural style: Greek Revival
- MPS: Davenport MRA
- NRHP reference No.: 83002440
- Added to NRHP: July 7, 1983

The Jacob Goering House was a historic building located on the hill above downtown Davenport, Iowa, United States. It was listed on the National Register of Historic Places in 1983. The house has subsequently been torn down and the location is now a parking lot for Palmer College of Chiropractic.

== History ==
Jacob Goering was an early labor organizer in Davenport who was involved in more militant national union efforts. He worked at the Chicago, Rock Island and Pacific Railroad shops, and was a leader in the railroad strike of 1877. When placed on the National Register of Historic Places it was one of a few buildings left in Davenport that reflected the city's major social movements of the 19th century.

== Architecture ==
The Goering house exemplified a popular and distinctive house type in 19th century Davenport, a vernacular form of the Greek Revival style. It was a two-story, three-bay, brick, front gable house with an oculus in the gable end. The Greek Revival entrance and four-paneled door that was framed by sidelights and a transom was a distinguishing feature of this house from other examples in this style.
