= Silver (surname) =

Silver is a surname. Notable people with the surname include:

- Abba Hillel Silver (1893–1963), Lithuanian-American rabbi
- Adam Silver (born 1962), American sports executive; NBA commissioner (2014–present)
- Annon Lee Silver (1938–1971), Canadian lyric soprano
- Benjamin Silver (1810–1894), American politician from Maryland
- Benjamin Silver Jr. (died 1890), American politician from Maryland
- Bernard Silver (1924–1963), an early developer of barcode technology
- Carol Ruth Silver (born 1938), American lawyer and civil rights activist
- David Silver (born 1976), Computer Scientist
- Eliezer Silver (1882–1968) Lithuanian Orthodox rabbi and American human rights activist
- Emily Silver (born 1985), retired American swimmer
- George Silver (ca. 1560s–1620s), British swordsman
- George Silver (actor) (1916–1984), English actor
- George Silver (agriculturalist), Scottish agricultural innovator
- Gray Silver (1870–1935), American politician and farmer from West Virginia
- Henry Silver (1918–1991), American physician
- Henry A. Silver (1826–1885), American politician from Maryland
- Horace Silver (1928–2014), American jazz pianist and composer
- Jack Silver (1942–2016), American set theorist and logician
- Jean Silver (1926–2000), American politician
- Jerry Silver, American neuroscientist
- Joan Micklin Silver (1935–2020), American film director
- Joe Silver (1922–1989), American actor
- Joel Silver (born 1952), Jewish-American film producer
- John Silver (musician) (born 1950), former second drummer for the rock band Genesis
- John Silver (wrestler) (born 1991), American professional wrestler
- Joseph Silver (1868–1918), South African criminal
- Josh Silver (born 1962), keyboardist and producer for the band Type O Negative
- Joshua Silver, British scientist
- Leon Silver (1925–2022), American geologist, professor of geology at Caltech and instructor to Apollo astronaut crews
- Liberty Silver (b.1961/2), Canadian singer
- Lou Silver (born 1953), American-Israeli basketball player
- Matthew Silver, Israeli historian
- Michael Silver (disambiguation), multiple people
- Monroe Silver (1875–1947), American dialect-comedian.
- Nate Silver (born 1978), sports and political journalist, founder of FiveThirtyEight.com
- Paul Silver (1948–2009), American seismologist
- Philip Silver (1909–1999), American philatelist
- Ric Silver, the creator of the Electric Slide line dance
- Ron Silver (1946–2009), American actor
- Scott Silver, American screenwriter
- Stu Silver, American screenwriter and television writer
- Sheldon Silver (1944–2022), American politician, speaker of the New York State Assembly
- Spencer Silver (1941–2021), American chemist and inventor
- Stephen Silver (born 1972), animator and cartoonist
- Stephen William Silver (1819–1905), merchant and book collector, son of Stephen Winckworth Silver
- Stephen Winckworth Silver (1790–1855), clothier and outfitter
- Steven Silver (actor) (born 1989), American actor
- Steven Silver (film director), film director
- Steven H Silver (born 1967), science fiction editor and publisher
- Susan Silver (born 1958), American music manager
- Thomas B. Silver (1947–2001), American author and president of the Claremont Institute
- Vivian Silver (1949–2023), Canadian-Israeli peace activist
- Warren Silver (born 1948), American lawyer and state supreme court justice in Maine
- William Chamberlain Silver (1814–1903), Canadian merchant and philanthropist

== Fictional characters ==
- Terry Silver, a character in 1989 American martial arts drama movie The Karate Kid Part III and television series Cobra Kai.
- Long John Silver, the main antagonist in the novel Treasure Island (1883) by Robert Louis Stevenson.

== See also ==
- Silvers (disambiguation)
