= Silveiras (disambiguation) =

Silveiras may refer to the following places:

- Silveiras, a town in the state of São Paulo, Brazil
- Silveiras (Montemor-o-Novo), a parish in the Montemor-o-Novo Municipality, Portugal

== See also ==
- Silveira
- Silva (disambiguation)
