= Smithson Tennant =

English chemist (1761–1815)

- Born: November 30, 1761; Shelby, Yorkshire, United Kingdom
- Died: February 22, 1815 (aged 53); Boulogne-sur-Mer, Hauts-de-France, France
- Education: University of Cambridge (MD)
- Occupation: Chemist
- Parent: Calvert Tennant

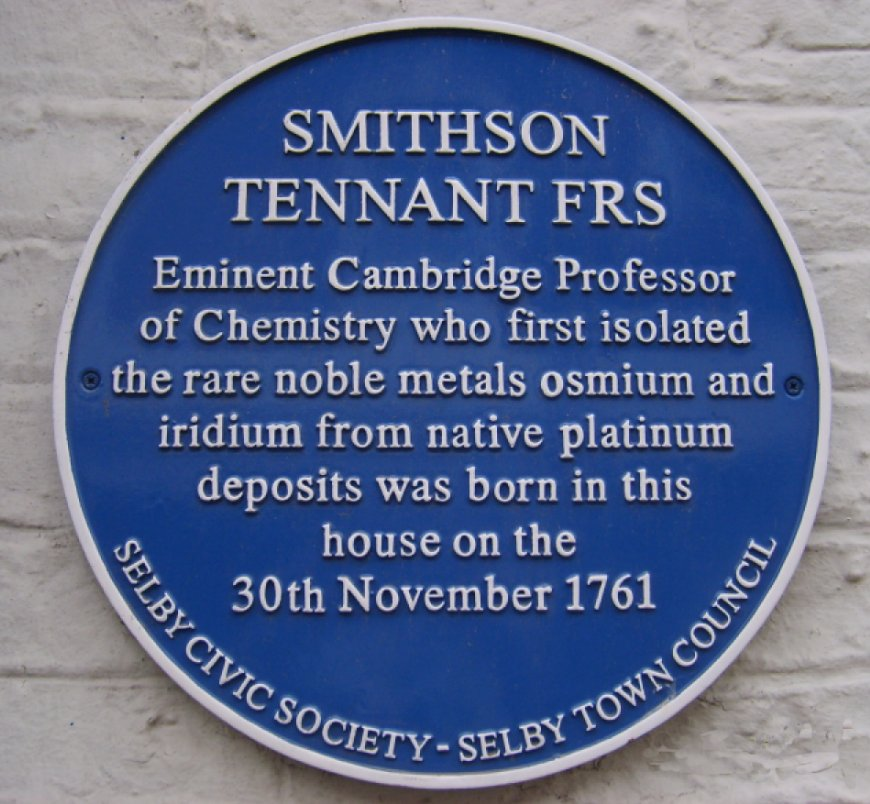
The blue plaque for Smithson Tennant in Finkle Street, Selby, North Yorkshire

Smithson Tennant FRS (30 November 1761 – 22 February 1815) was an English chemist. He is best known for his discovery of the elements iridium and osmium, which he found in the residues from the solution of platinum ores in 1803. He also contributed to the proof of the identity of diamond and charcoal. The mineral tennantite is named after him.

== Life ==
Tennant was born in Selby in Yorkshire. His father was Calvert Tennant (named after his grandmother Phyllis Calvert, a granddaughter of Cecilius Calvert, 2nd Baron Baltimore). His own name derives from his grandmother Rebecca Smithson, widow of Joshua Hitchling. He attended Beverley Grammar School and there is a plaque over one of the entrances to the present school commemorating his discovery of the two elements, osmium and iridium. He began to study medicine at Edinburgh in 1781, but after a few months moved to Cambridge, where he devoted himself to botany and chemistry. He graduated M.D. at Cambridge in 1796, and about the same time purchased an estate near Cheddar, where he carried out agricultural experiments. He was appointed professor of chemistry at Cambridge in 1813, but lived to deliver only one course of lectures, being killed near Boulogne-sur-Mer by the fall of a bridge over which he was riding.

== Legacy ==
In 2006, American Elements discovered new technology allowing for the casting of seamless iridium rings for use in spacecraft and satellites. In 2016, the company utilized the same technology to introduce a line of iridium wedding bands marketed under the trademark Smithson Tennant.
