= Roslyn Flats =

- U.S. National Register of Historic Places
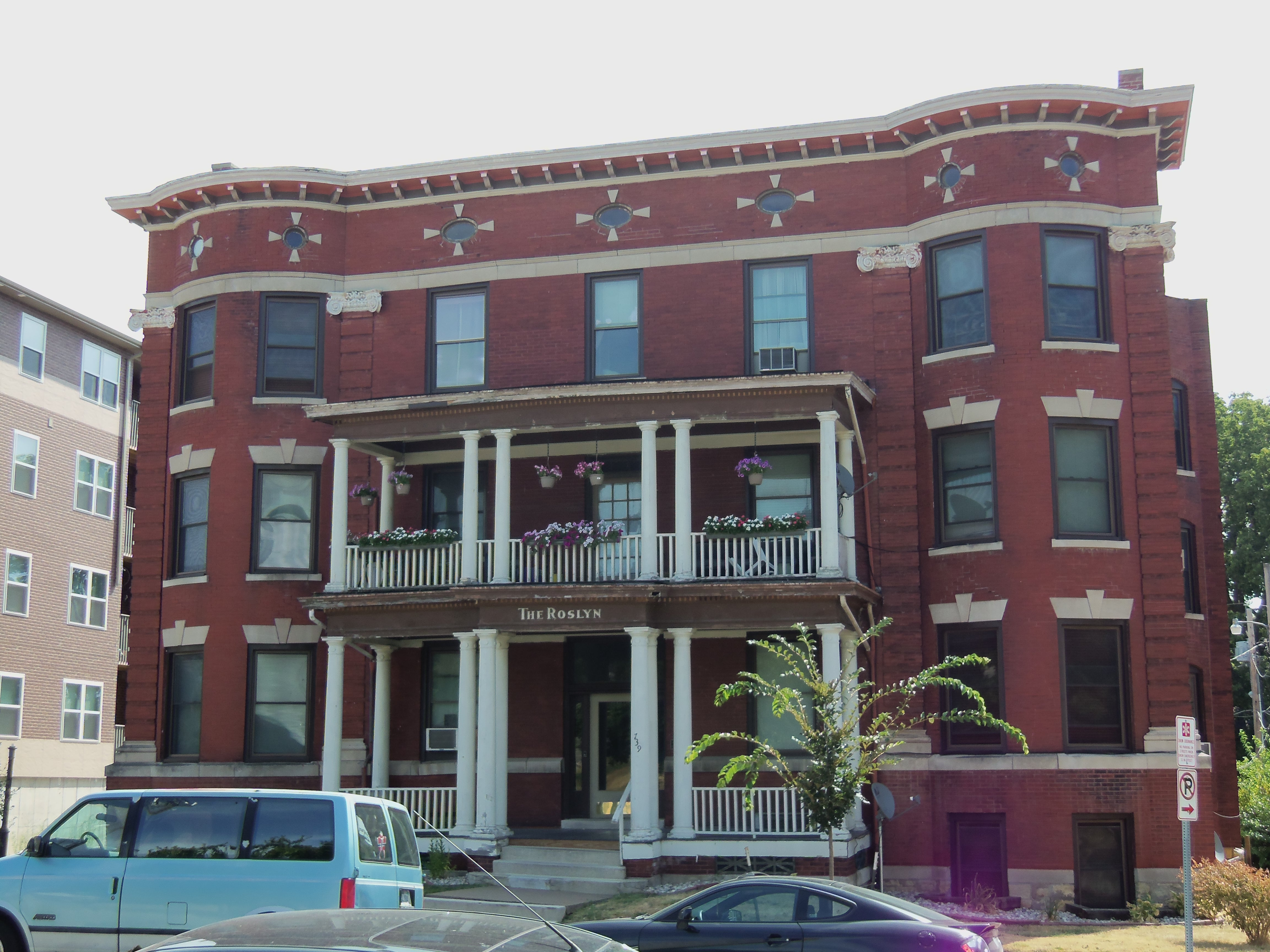
- Roslyn Flats in 2012

- Location within Iowa Location within the United States
- Location: 739 Perry St. Davenport, Iowa
- Coordinates: 41°31′40″N 90°34′20″W
- Area: less than one acre
- Built: 1901
- Architectural style: Late 19th and 20th Century Revivals
- MPS: Davenport MRA]
- NRHP reference No.: 83004375
- Added to NRHP: July 7, 1983

The Roslyn Flats is a historic building located on the hill above downtown Davenport, Iowa, United States. It was constructed in 1901 and listed on the National Register of Historic Places in 1983. The apartment building was one of several that were built near the campus of Palmer College of Chiropractic.

== Architecture ==
Roslyn Flats follows the basic design of apartment buildings built in the late 19th and early 20th centuries in Davenport. The building is a three-story structure built over a raised basement and constructed in brick. Bay windows frame the façade on the north and south sides and a two-story porch was constructed between them. Flanking the window bays are rusticated brick pilasters that end in Ionic caps. The cornice features a plain molded architrave below a wide frieze into which are set small Adamesque oval windows. The building features the "formalism, sharp lines and studied elegance" that is found in Federalist architecture.
