= Maui Nui Botanical Gardens =

Botanical gardens in Kahului, Maui, Hawaii

Coordinates: 20.8931°N 156.4860°W

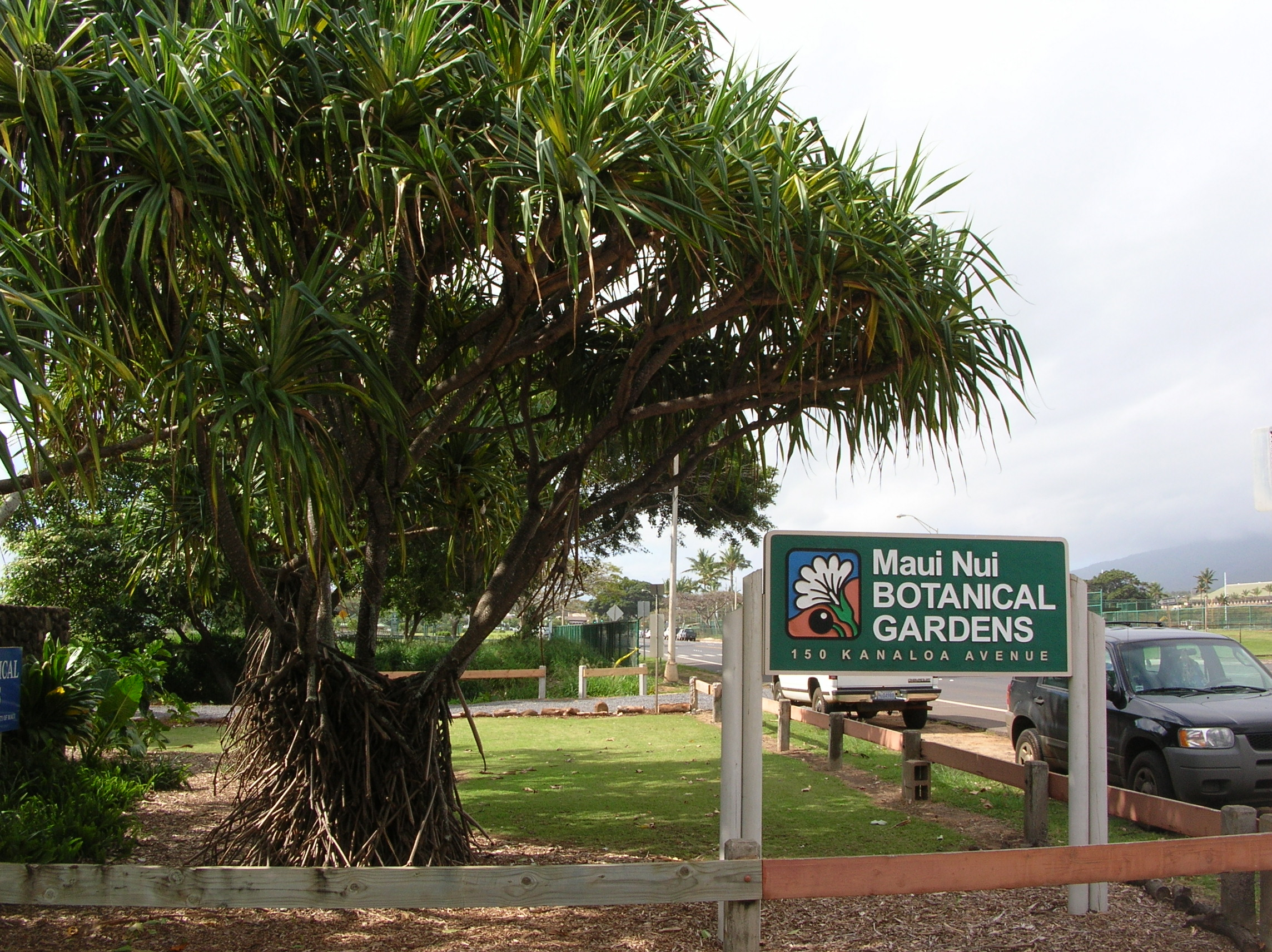
- Interactive map of Maui Nui Botanical Gardens
- Website: MNBG.org

Maui Nui Botanical Gardens formerly known as the Maui Zoological and Botanical Gardens, are botanical gardens covering 5 acres (2.0 ha) and located at 150 Kanaloa Avenue, Kahului, Maui, Hawaii.

The gardens were established in 1976 by Rene Sylva within a coastal dune system, and are primarily focused on conserving native Hawaiian plants of the dry forest and coastal areas of Maui Nui (Maui, Molokai, Lanai, and Kahoolawe). The gardens also contain a good collection of Polynesian-introduced plants. At present, plantings include 40 sugarcane varieties, 15 sweet potato varieties, and over 60 known taro varieties.

The gardens also include a greenhouse and a shade house for plant propagation, picnic tables, and restrooms.

== See also ==
- List of botanical gardens in the United States
