= Volney Mathison =

American novelist (1897–1965)

Volney G. Mathison
- Born: August 13, 1897
- Died: January 3, 1965 (aged 67)
- Other name: Dex Volney
- Occupations: Writer, inventor
- Known for: Inventor of the E-meter

Volney G. Mathison, also known by the pseudonym Dex Volney (August 13, 1897 – January 3, 1965), was an American chiropractor, writer, and inventor of the first E-meter used by the Church of Scientology.

== Family ==
In 1935, Mathison was married to Jean Darrell, a music librarian for NBC. She died in November 1964.

== Career ==
=== Writer ===
Dust jacket of The Radiobuster by Volney G. Mathison

In 1921, Mathison wrote the fictional short story "A Phony Phone", which was published in Radio News edited by Hugo Gernsback. In 1924, he wrote the fictional book The Radiobuster: Being Some of the Adventures of Samuel Jones, Deep Sea Wireless Operator. The book is listed in American Fiction, 1901-1925: A Bibliography. Mathison's story "The Death Bottle" was published in Weird Tales in March 1925. He also wrote stories most of which were published under the pseudonym of "Dex Volney". His pieces as "Dex Volney" were of the Western genre, and set in Alaska. According to Science-Fiction: The Gernsback Years, Mathison was "a prolific author" under this pseudonym. As Dex Volney, he wrote popular stories published by Street & Smith.

In the June 1929 issue of Amazing Stories, Mathison's story "The Mongolian's Ray" appeared and was promoted on the cover. Forrest J. Ackerman and Brad Linaweaver write in the book Worlds of Tomorrow, "In this story, he created the fictional device that shortly after the introduction of Dianetics, morphed into reality as the E-meter employed today to supposedly reveal the personalities of individuals interested in becoming 'clears' in the Dianetic regimen." Mathison's story "Thor Olsen's Ace" was selected for inclusion in The World's Best Short Stories of 1930.

=== Inventor ===
In 1935, Mathison was employed building short wave radios. He was also a chiropractor and psychoanalyst. According to some critics of Scientology, Mathison designed and built the first E-meter in the 1940s, which he called a Mathison Electropsychometer, or E-meter, to read electrodermal activity. However, Mathison wrote in his own book, Electropsychometry, that he first began considering the subject of E-meters when he attended a series of lectures in 1950 and other writers identify the lecturer as L. Ron Hubbard.

The E-meter "has a needle that swings back and forth across a scale when a patient holds on to two electrical contacts". He used the device to investigate the psychoanalytic problems of his patients. He then employed self-hypnosis tapes, and instructed his patients to use them to address those issues. The device became popular and was used among other chiropractors. John Freeman writes in Suppressed and Incredible Inventions, "Recalling my visits at the height of his career, I remember that, while his results were outstanding, he was typically fought by the Medical Profession." The Mathison meter was based on the Wheatstone bridge invented in 1833. Earlier electrodermal activity meters were used by Ivane Tarkhnishvili in 1889 and popularized by Carl Gustav Jung in a series of papers published in 1904.

Volney Mathison uses an E-meter to analyze a patient, circa 1951

Mathison was a follower of Dianetics founded by L. Ron Hubbard. Hubbard incorporated Mathison's device into Scientology practices. Hubbard often called him simply "Mathison" in his writings. According to author Paulette Cooper, Scientologists erroneously referred to him as "Olin Mathison". Simon Singh and Edzard Ernst write in Trick or Treatment that "The E-meter was also widely used by the Church of Scientology, so much so that many Scientologists believe that it was invented by their founder L. Ron Hubbard."

According to the 1986 memoirs of Hubbard's son, Ronald DeWolf, after establishing usage of the E-meter in Dianetics, Hubbard asked Mathison to give the patent rights to him, but Mathison refused to give up the patent rights, wishing that it remain the "Mathison E-meter". Mathison was granted U.S. patent 2,684,670 for his vacuum tube E-meter in 1954. But DeWolf was inconsistent on this history. In an earlier sworn affidavit to the Federal District Court in about 1980, DeWolf stated that Mathison gave Hubbard his rights to the E-meter in 1952.

Another writer tells yet a third version this history. According to Gordon Melton, the first E-meter was "developed by Volney Mathison, following Hubbard's designs."

Use of the E-meter in Dianetics practice was subsequently stopped by Hubbard in 1954. In 1966, Hubbard was awarded a United States patent for a solid-state E-meter, described as a "Device for Measuring and Indicating Changes in Resistance of a Living Body".

According to some writers, Mathison was bitter and disillusioned about Scientology.

Many of Mathison's professional activities and publications — chiropractic, psychoanalysis, past life regression, and hypnotherapy — have been classed as pseudosciences by various critics.

== Bibliography ==
=== Fiction ===
- Mathison, Volney G. (1924). The Radiobuster: Being Some of the Adventures of Samuel Jones, Deep Sea Wireless Operator. Philadelphia, Pennsylvania: Frederick A. Stokes Company. OCLC 6869013.
- "The Death Bottle," Weird Tales, March 1925
- Dex Volney, "Renegade of Eagle Cove," North•West Romances, Summer 1943 (last known published fiction)

=== Non-fiction ===
- Volney, Dex (1927). "Beginning the Story". In Hills, William Henry; Luce, Robert (eds.). The Writer. p. 57. Volume 39.
- Hubbard, L. Ron; Mathison, Volney G. (1952). Electropsychometric Auditing / Operator's Manual / Dianetics and Scientology [with] Notes on Technique 100. Phoenix, AZ: The Office of L. Ron Hubbard.
- Mathison, Volney G. (1952). Electropsychometry. V. G. Mathison. OCLC 57001177.
- Mathison, Volney G. (1953). Manual Electropsychometry. Mathison Electropsychometers.
- Mathison, Volney G. (1954). Creative Image Therapy. Mathison Electropsychometer. OCLC 55984760.
- Mathison, Volney G. (1956). How to Achieve Past Life Recalls. Quincy, Massachusetts: Institute of Physical and Mental Development. OCLC 42019616.
- Mathison, Volney G. (1956). The Secret of the Lourdes Miracles Revealed. Los Angeles, California: Mathison Electropsychometers. OCLC 49324997.
- Mathison, Volney G. (1957). Practical Self-Hypnosis: How to Achieve and Effectively to Use Hypnosis Without the Presence of an Operator. Mathison Electro Psychometers. OCLC 54514206.
- Mathison, Volney G. (1957). Space-Age Self Hypnosis.
- Mathison, Volney G. (1958). The Secret Power of the Crystal Pendulum. Institute of Self Hypnosis.

== See also ==
- List of chiropractors
- List of inventors
