= B.J. Palmer House =

Historic house in Iowa, United States

- U.S. National Register of Historic Places
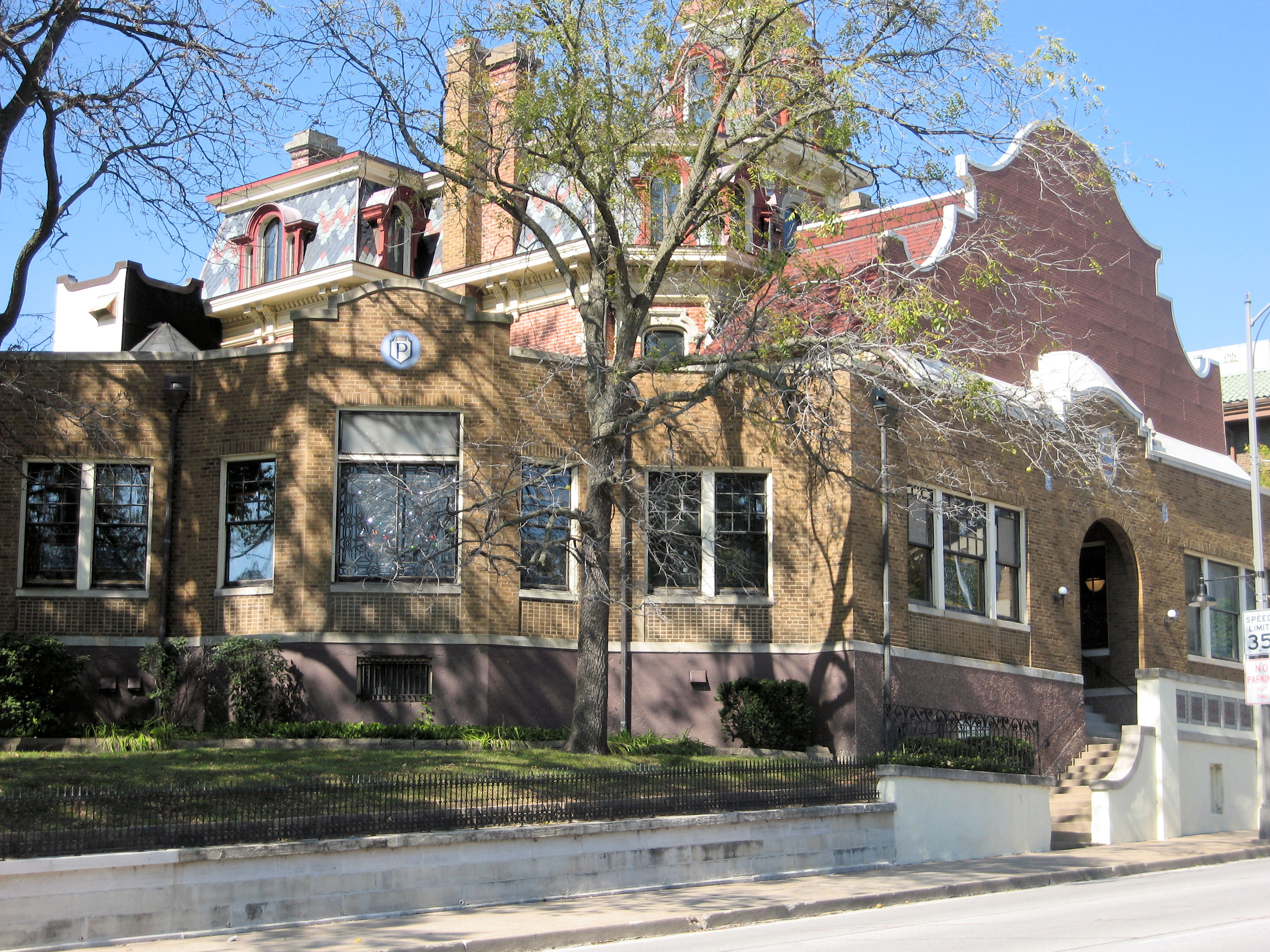

- Location within Iowa Location within the United States
- Interactive map showing the location of B.J. Palmer House
- Location: 808 Brady St. Davenport, Iowa
- Coordinates: 41°31′34″N 90°34′29″W
- Area: less than one acre
- Built: 1874
- Architectural style: Second Empire
- MPS: Davenport MRA
- NRHP reference No.: 84001497
- Added to NRHP: July 27, 1984

The B.J. Palmer House, also known as the Palmer Family Residence, is a historic building located on the Brady Street Hill in Davenport, Iowa, United States. It is on the campus of Palmer College of Chiropractic and has been listed on the National Register of Historic Places since 1984. The college offers tours of the first floor of the mansion.

== B.J. Palmer ==
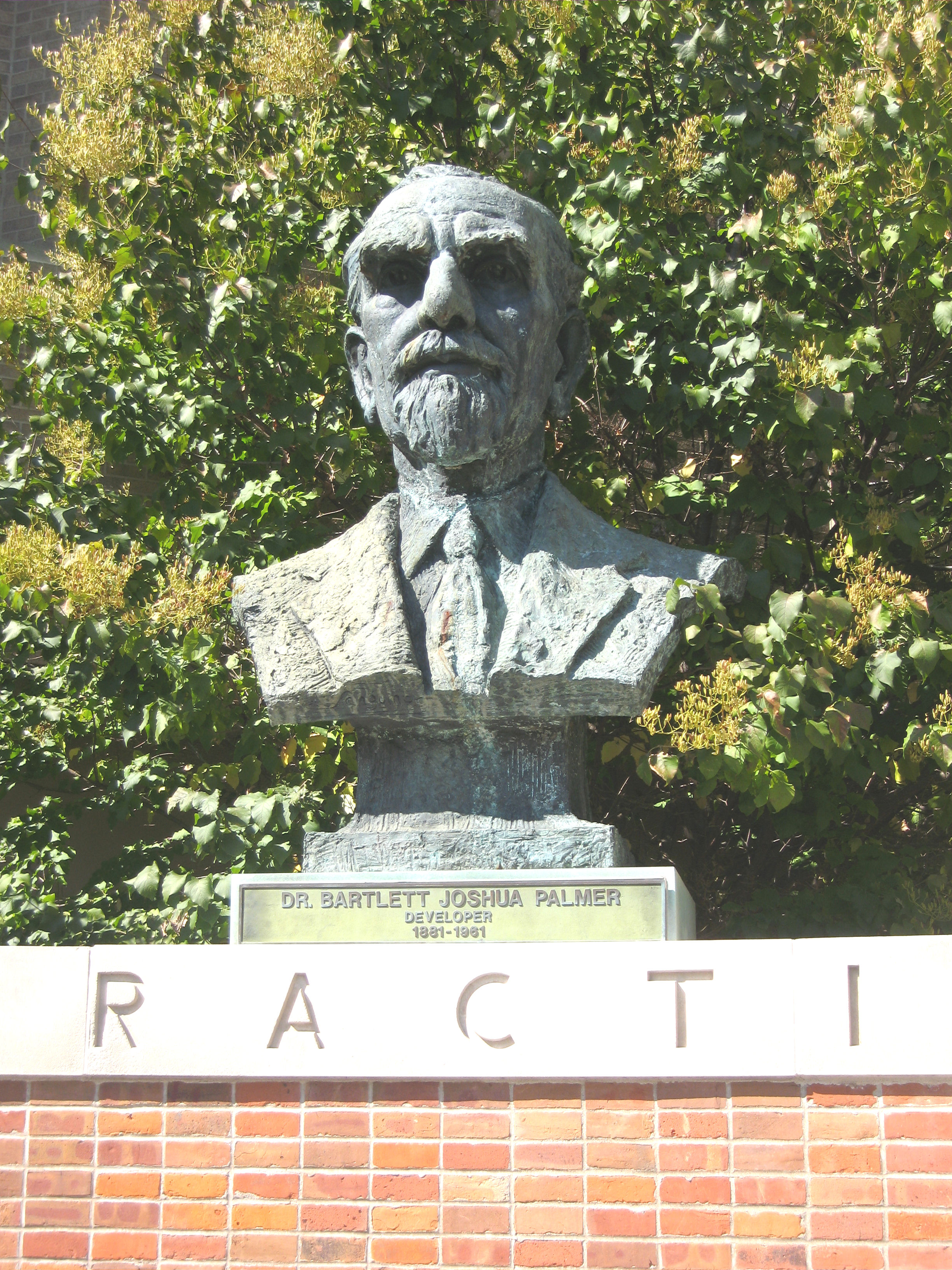
B.J. Palmer

Bartlett Joshua Palmer (1882–1961) was the son of Daniel David Palmer, who established the practice of chiropractic. B.J. Palmer convinced his father to establish a school of chiropractic in Davenport. In the first decade of the 20th century, B.J. Palmer purchased the mansions built by J.C. Duncan, W.D. Petersen and Thomas Barron on the top of Brady Street for the school. He served the college as its president and is credited with the development of chiropractic. In 1922 he bought a small radio station in Rock Island, Illinois, and moved it to a studio near the school's campus and it became WOC. It was the second commercial radio station in the United States and the first west of the Mississippi River. Palmer created a communications dynasty during the 1930s and 1940s after he acquired WHO in Des Moines in 1930.

== Palmer Family Residence ==
The Palmer Family Residence was built in the Second Empire style in 1874 by Louis C. Dessaint, who was a local lumber mill owner. F.H. Hancock bought the house in 1886 and William D. Petersen bought it in 1895. He was a part of the family that owned a department store downtown that became Von Maur. The Petersen family redecorated the house in 1905. They had the parquet floors, painted plaster moldings and Italian marble fireplaces installed in the house. Palmer acquired the property in 1912 for $25,000.

In 1921-1922 he had the 140-foot (43 m) enclosed porch built around the structure that created a room for entertaining. In most cases this would be considered a significant alteration of the original building, but because it reflects Palmer's peculiar personality and his disassociation from the traditional tastes of Davenport's elite, it is significant in its own right. The porch is an odd assortment of institutional form with residential features such as the beveled glass. WOC radio had its first studio on the porch.

The home contains an Aeolian player pipe organ that was purchased by the Palmers for $75,000. B.J. Palmer's favorite room in the house was called the rustic room. It incorporated the trunks and branches of four oak trees that were cut down to make room for a classroom building that was built next to the house. Some of the logs are wrapped in belts with metal buckles from the uniforms of Palmer students who served in World War I. The house also contains a sunken solarium that features a ceiling of square latticework that is painted to look like a circus wagon in colors of yellow, green, orange and red. The white wicker furniture in the solarium came from a Philippine prison. It also contains an eclectic collection that includes a humidor and umbrella stand made out of elephants’ feet, which is next to a kangaroo from Australia. There is a bird of paradise on top of a Bodhisattva from India, which is on top of a cabinet from Korea placed on top of Native American rugs. It also contains a shrine from the Philippines holding a Hindu idol with a piece of African art. Rounding out the collection is a figure in Carrara marble from Italy, a Buddha from Siam, Japanese lanterns, and a Buddhist monk's umbrella that has been made into a light fixture.

The house's kitchen has been restored to its 1950s appearance. The floor is covered in multi-colored tiles. Palmer obtained these from a local merchant, Wayne Montgomery, who would keep aside a floor tile every time he sold a batch of them. In time the kitchen was covered in the tiles where no two look alike. The kitchen also contains a Roper stove and a Kelvinator Foodarama refrigerator/freezer. The walls and woodwork are painted in bright circus colors. The butler's pantry still contains dishes that bear the Palmer crest.

== A Little Bit O’ Heaven ==
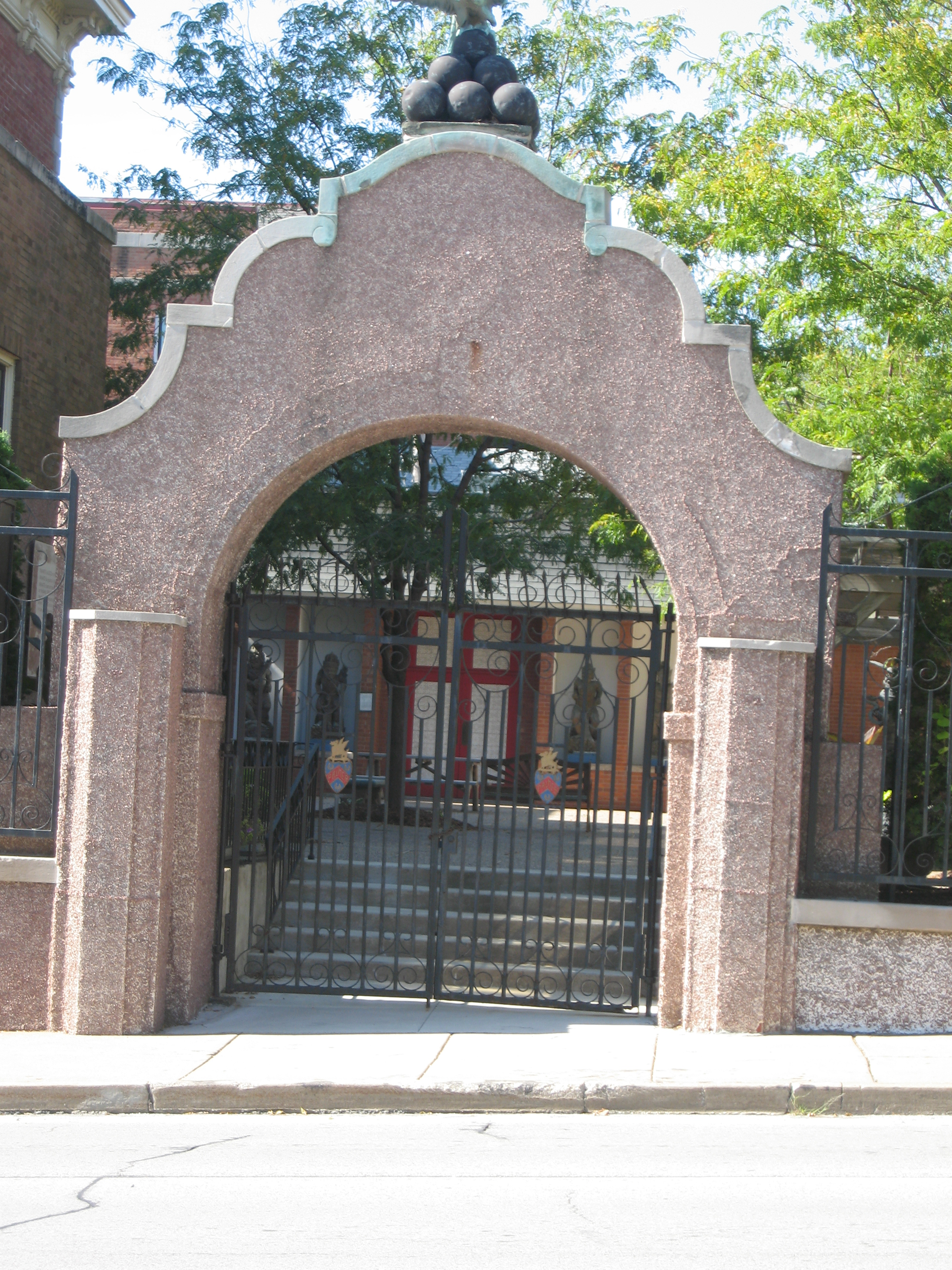
The entrance of A Little Bit O' Heaven

Palmer started to build a garden along the north side of the house in 1924 that he called A Little Bit O’ Heaven. It was largely a collection of artwork and artifacts that Palmer and his wife, Mabel Heath Palmer, collected on their trips to Asia and Europe. Part of the collection was also kept on the porch. A courtyard contained items such as totem poles, statues of deer, birds and the birth of Venus. There was a rock-lined corridor called “purgatory” that led to the heart of the exhibit that contained a large greenhouse with a waterfall of 40 feet (12 m) and a pond that was filled with tropical fish, alligators and Oriental art. The site also contained what Palmer claimed was the smallest chapel in the world, it was 8 square feet (0.74 m^{2}), and thousands of people wed there. For a small fee the public was allowed to visit the site. It was one of the most popular attractions in Davenport. After Palmer's death in 1961 A Little Bit O’ Heaven started to decline and it was closed to the public in 1981 and it was dismantled in 1983.

Over their lifetime the Palmers amassed a large collection of artifacts that decorated their house and A Little Bit O’ Heaven. Half of the Palmer's collection went to their son David when Mabel died. When B.J. died, half of what was left was relocated to the Putnam Museum in Davenport. The remainder went to the Palmer's three granddaughters and what was left over remains in the house. The house remains a part of Palmer College today and the courtyard became a patio for students.
