= Clarence Gonstead =

American chiropractor (1898–1978)

- Born: July 23, 1898; Willow Lake, South Dakota
- Died: October 2, 1978 (aged 80); Mount Horeb, Wisconsin
- Resting place: Mount Horeb, Wisconsin
- Education: Palmer School of Chiropractic
- Occupation: Chiropractor
- Years active: 1923–1978
- Known for: chiropractic technique
- Title: Doctor
- Spouse: Elvira (Meister) Gonstead

Clarence Selmer Gonstead (July 23, 1898 – October 2, 1978) was an American chiropractor. He created the Gonstead technique. He established a large chiropractic facility in Mount Horeb, Wisconsin.

== Early life ==
Clarence Gonstead was born in Willow Lake, South Dakota, the son of Carl Gonstead (1871–1956) and Sarah Gonstead (1874–1918). His family later moved to a dairy farm in Primrose, Wisconsin. At the age of 19, Gonstead was bedridden with rheumatoid arthritis. After receiving chiropractic treatment for his arthritis, he was motivated to enroll in the Palmer School of Chiropractic in Davenport, Iowa.

Gonstead became a member of the chiropractic fraternity Delta Sigma Chi. Gonstead earned a doctor of chiropractic degree in 1923 and returned to Wisconsin. He first practiced with Dr. Olson, the man who inspired him to become a chiropractor, before establishing a practice in Mt. Horeb, Wisconsin. His younger brother, Merton Gonstead (1902–1983), joined his practice in 1929 for a few years before starting his own practice. Clarence Gonstead remained a sole practitioner for the next twenty years.

== Career ==
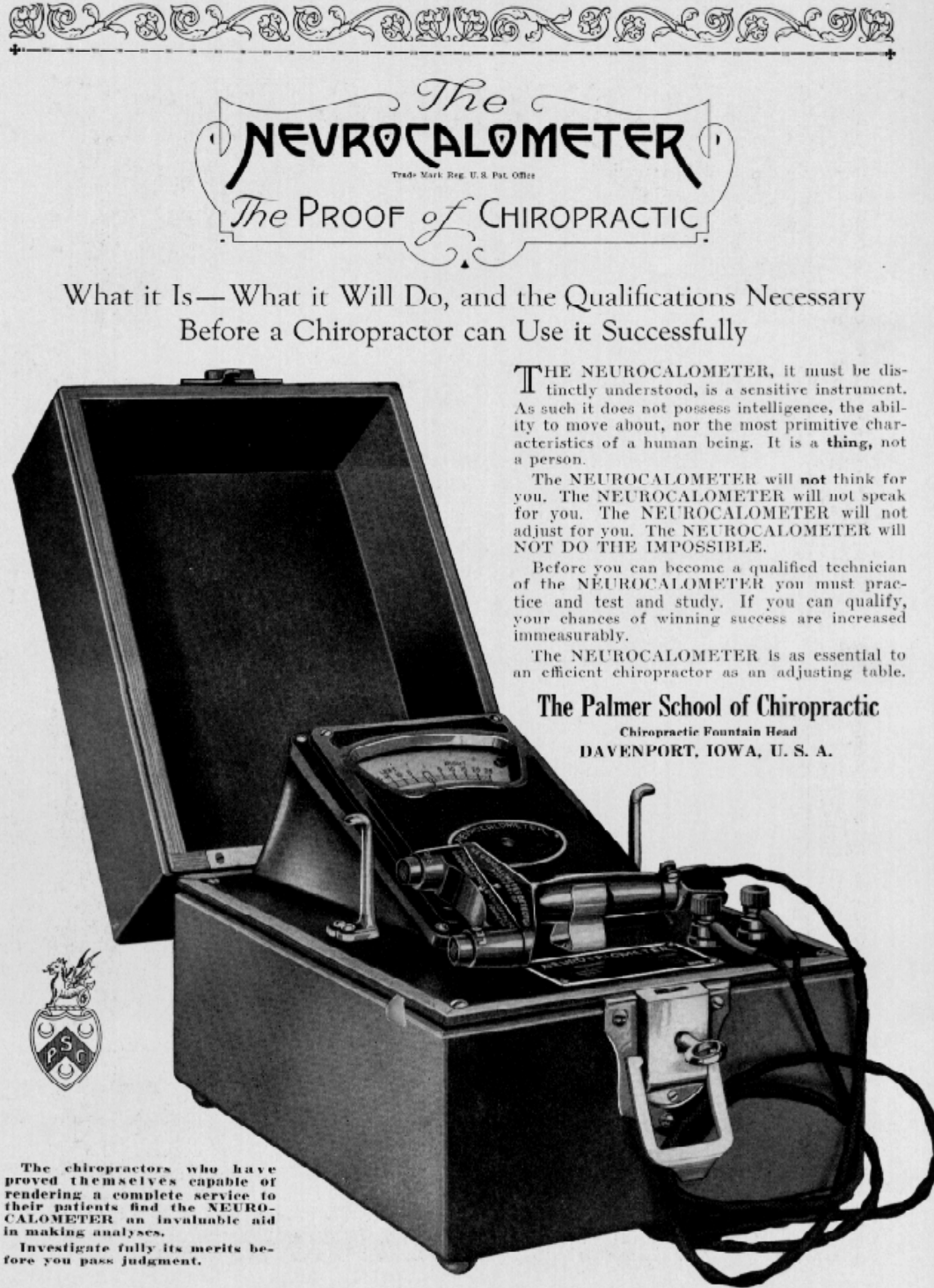
1925 advertisement for the Neurocalometer from Palmer School of Chiropractic

Gonstead's method of chiropractic practice was an extension of his training at the Palmer School of Chiropractic. While Gonstead was a student, school president B. J. Palmer began promoting the neurocalometer (NCM), an invention of chiropractor Dossa Dixon Evins (1886–1932). Gonstead assisted in various efforts to improve the quality of these two instruments. In the 1940s Gonstead became a consultant for Electronic Development Laboratories (EDL). EDL made the original Nervoscope, a competitor device to the NCM. Over the years, Gonstead helped the company define the device's sensitivity, parameters, and function. Gonstead also worked with various X-ray companies to optimize full-spine 14x36 X-ray exposure, primarily the use of split screens to account for varying patient density on the lateral film.

Gonstead's first office was located above a bank building in downtown Mount Horeb, Wisconsin. In 1939, Gonstead built the first Gonstead Chiropractic Clinic (or second office) in downtown Mount Horeb. In 1964 he opened a second clinic just outside Mount Horeb which treated 300 to 400 patients per day. It was designed by John Steinmann. The next year, 1965, a motel (Karakahl Country Inn) was constructed next to the clinic to accommodate out-of-town patients and chiropractors attending his seminar.

== Later years ==
In 1974, Gonstead sold his clinic and seminars to Alex and Doug Cox. Gonstead's inventory was later auctioned. His clinic continues operation under the ownership of the non-profit C.S. Gonstead Chiropractic Foundation.

== Personal life ==
In 1924, Gonstead married Elvira Meister (1901–1991). Gonstead died in 1978 at the age of 80. He was buried at Mount Horeb Union Cemetery in Mount Horeb, Wisconsin.

== See also ==
- History of chiropractic
