= Michael Silver =

Michael Silver, Mike Silver or Michael Silvers may refer to:

- Michael Silver (CEO) (born 1955), American Elements CEO
- Michael Silver (sportswriter), American sportswriter
- Michael B. Silver (born 1967), American actor
- Michael Silver, better known as CFCF, Canadian electronic musician
- Mike Silver, U.S. Army officer who assisted in the capture of the enemy combatant Omar Khadr
- Michael Silvers (born 1958), sound editor at Pixar
- Mike Silver (musician) (born 1945), UK singer-songwriter
