= Sid E. Williams =

Founder of Life University

Sidney E. Williams
- Born: March 18, 1928; Rome, Georgia
- Died: December 27, 2012 (aged 84); Powder Springs, Georgia
- Occupation: Chiropractor
- Known for: Founder of Life University; 7th President of the International Chiropractors Association

Sidney E. Williams (March 18, 1928 – December 27, 2012), known primarily as Dr. Sid, was an American chiropractor most well known for establishing the largest single-campus chiropractic school, Life University. Williams was also president of the International Chiropractors Association, serving as its seventh president from 1982 to 1985, and was an instrumental figure in the creation of Life Chiropractic College West.

Williams is also well known for being a star football player during his college career at Georgia Tech, where he started as a defensive left end from 1950 to 1952. Highlights of his football career include winning the 1952 Orange Bowl, and his subsequent election to the Georgia Tech Yellow Jackets Hall of Fame.

== Early life ==
Sid Williams was born on March 18, 1928, in Rome, Georgia. He attended Tech High School in Atlanta, Georgia and while there earned the rank of Eagle Scout, and joined the Reserve Officers' Training Corps where he served as a Lieutenant Colonel and captain of the drill and rifle team. During his sophomore year at high school, Williams also joined the football team as a quarterback, and was starting for the team after only three weeks of fall practice.

In 1946, Williams graduated from high school and by 1947 joined the 179th Field Artillery unit, 22nd Infantry Division, in the Georgia Army National Guard. He served for a period of one year, and advanced to the rank of second lieutenant. Following his military service, in 1948, Williams fielded scholarships from over ten different colleges before settling on his parents' Alma mater, Georgia Tech. While at Georgia Tech, Williams began as a 4th string left back before being promoted to the varsity squad in his second year of school. For the 1950 and 1952 seasons, Williams started as defensive left end, and he played in the 1952 Orange Bowl where Georgia Tech beat Baylor University with a fourth quarter field goal. His coach, Bobby Dodd, at one time explained Williams by stating, "For his size, Sid Williams is the best end in America. Sid is very clever, can move well and hits as hard as any defensive end I have ever seen ... There is no way to overestimate his defensive value to our team."

During Williams' last year of college football he sustained many injuries, and was amazed at the care he received from a local chiropractor in Atlanta. Following his chiropractic experience, Williams decided to quit the pursuit of his master's degree in Labor Relations and attend Palmer College of Chiropractic in Davenport, Iowa. He and his newly-wedded wife, Nell Kimbrough, decided to both attend Palmer for the four years following their education at Georgia Tech.

== Chiropractic ==
Upon graduating from Palmer College of Chiropractic in 1956, Drs. Sid and Nell Williams moved to Austell, Georgia where they set up their first chiropractic office. Within a few years the pair had opened up and were running more than 18 clinics in the Atlanta metro area. On Tuesday nights, Williams would invite individuals from the community to attend what he called "Dynamic Essentials" (DE) meetings. These meetings would cover the philosophy and use of chiropractic care in day-to-day life, and would be a staple of the chiropractic profession for the rest of Williams' life.

Williams, by then a member of the International Chiropractors Association (ICA), and wanting to do more for the profession, began a 501(c)(3) organization called the Life Foundation International. Around the same time, he began publishing a chiropractic magazine named Today's Chiropractic which became an international publication and the platform Williams used to voice his beliefs and philosophy about chiropractic. In 1982, Williams was elected as the president of the ICA, and served in this position until 1985. Following his service as president he resided as ICA Chairman of the Board, and as Chair of ICA’s Legislative Committee. Due to his contributions to chiropractic and the ICA, Williams was awarded with the Chiropractor of the Year award from the ICA in 1985.

=== Life University ===
In 1974, Sid and Nell Williams founded Life Chiropractic College in Marietta, Georgia. During one of their summer Life DE meetings, the Williams' raised over 500 thousand dollars (equivalent to $2,536,000 in 2025 dollars) to fund the program. The campus was originally leased from the Lockheed Corporation, and on January 20, 1975, Life Chiropractic College opened with a pioneer class of 22 students.

During his tenure, Williams grew the school's total enrollment to over 3,500 students, making it the largest chiropractic college in the world at the time. Much of this increase was due to William's aggressive advertising campaign in the Atlanta area, which included running commercials for the school on television while the Atlanta Braves were being broadcast. Williams also was determined to field a nationally winning basketball team and hired Roger Kaiser to coach at Life. The team, a member of the NAIA, went on to win three national championships while Williams was president — one in 1997, 1999, and 2000.

Williams was also a key figure in the creation of Life Chiropractic College West, in Hayward, California. This college, founded as Pacific States Chiropractic College in 1976, quickly was faced with multiple malfeasance cases and as a result went through a turnover of presidents at a quick rate. In 1981, Williams, along with two other doctors, agreed to merge Pacific States with Life Chiropractic College to create what is now colloquially known as Life West.

In 2002, due to issues surrounding Life's accreditation with the Council on Chiropractic Education, Williams was forced to retire. Over fifty areas for improvement were cited for the loss of accreditation, most of them stemming from differences between the agency and Williams' own philosophy. One year after his retirement the school regained its accreditation status.

== Personal life ==
Williams married Nell Kimbrough (now Nell K. Williams) on March 21, 1953. Together they had two children, Kim and John. In 1995, the Georgia Council of Chiropractic awarded Williams with the distinction of "Chiropractor of the Century" for all his positive work towards the profession.

On December 24, 2011, Williams suffered from a stroke in middle cerebral artery which took him out of the public spotlight. He battled with recovery for one year before dying due to complications of pneumonia on December 27, 2012, in Powder Springs, Georgia.

== Publications ==
- Looking Back To See Ahead: Editorials On Chiropractic Science, Philosophy And Principles, With Essays On Leadership And Motivation (1994) ISBN 978-1886011014
- Lasting Purpose: Mindset for Success (1996) ISBN 978-1558744325
- The Road to Success Starts in the Heart: An Anthology of Lyceums (2009) ISBN 978-1934216712

Academic offices
| Preceded by Position Created | President of Life University; 1975-2002 | Succeeded by Michael Schmidt (interim) |
