= Michael Silver (CEO) =

American business executive and philanthropist

Michael N. Silver
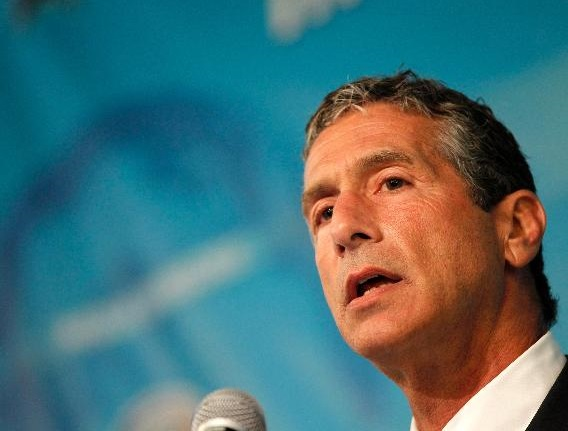
- Born: May 10, 1955 (age 71)
- Education: University of Southern California
- Occupations: Materials Science Entrepreneur & Inventor
- Organization(s): Chairman & CEO, American Elements; Trustee, Natural History Museum of Los Angeles County; Director, Institute of Contemporary Art, Los Angeles
- Known for: Founder of American Elements; Materials Science Pioneer; Rare Earths & Inner Mongolia; Philanthropy

Michael Nathan Silver (born May 10, 1955) is a business executive, philanthropist, art collector, and commentator. He is the founder and CEO of American Elements, a global high-technology materials manufacturer. He helped establish the post-Cold War rare earth supply chain from China to the U.S. and Europe. His philanthropy includes sponsoring materials science and green technology conferences and educational television programs on high technology and contributing funding to the arts. He served as a trustee of the Natural History Museum of Los Angeles County and serves on the directors council of the Getty Museum and on the board of directors of the Institute of Contemporary Art in Los Angeles, CA. He writes and speaks on science education and Sino-American relations.

== Early life and education ==
Michael Silver was born and raised in Los Angeles, California. He attended the University of Southern California (USC) receiving a B.A. degree in behavioral neuroscience in 1978 and then attended USC's JD/MBA dual degree program graduating in 1982. He practiced corporate law for 10 years, specializing in mergers & acquisitions.

== Business career ==
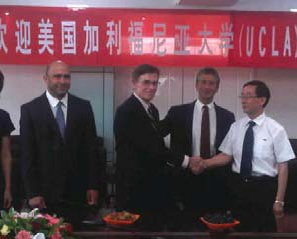
Silver with UCLA delegation in Inner Mongolia in 2011

In the mid-1990s Silver founded American Elements as a manufacturer and metals refiner of rare earths and other critical minerals serving U.S. industry. Upon the closing of Unocal/Molycorp in Mountain Pass, California and the Rhodia rare earth refinery in Freeport, Texas, ending U.S. rare earths metal production, he established the post-Cold War rare earth supply chain from Inner Mongolia, China to the U.S., Europe and Japan. He then established American Elements facilities in Salt Lake City, Utah; Monterrey, Mexico; Baotou, China; and Manchester, England and expanded production to include newly discovered elemental forms of other advanced materials such as nanoparticles, green technology & alternative energy materials and advanced military alloys. In February 2021, Silver acquired 100% ownership of New Harbour Distillery, a South African-based distiller.

In April 2025, Silver appeared on CNN’s One World with Zain Asher, where he discussed China’s new export restrictions on rare earth materials and addressed potential challenges for U.S. supply chains.

== Philanthropic activities ==
Silver established the not-for-profit American Elements' Academics & Periodicals Department in 2006 which supports high school, college and graduate school education in high technology and materials science. The Department has sponsored academic and industry conferences in fields including space exploration, nanotechnology, green technologies, solar energy and robotics. In 2011, it co-sponsored with the National Science Foundation a four-part PBS TV series on NOVA entitled Making Stuff examining the world of materials science. Silver hosted a delegation in 2011 from the UCLA Medical Center in Los Angeles, California to the Inner Mongolian Medical Teaching College in Baotou, China which has led to student and teacher exchanges and the development of a joint AIDS program. He served as a trustee of the Natural History Museum of Los Angeles County (2017-2021) and serves as a member of the board of directors of the Institute of Contemporary Art, Los Angeles and the Sarara Initiative in Northern Kenya and the council of the Getty Research Institute in Los Angeles. He also serves on the directors council of the Getty Museum in Los Angeles and has underwritten artists in residence at the UCLA Hammer Museum. In winter 2021, Silver established the Michael Silver Fund with a gift to the J. Paul Getty Museum. In recognition of the gift, the Getty Board of Trustees named the Michael Silver Family Gallery at the museum. He has made in-kind donations of artwork to the National Museum of African American History & Culture in Washington, DC.

== Writing and speeches ==
Silver writes and speaks on several topics including:

- American Global Competitiveness in High Technology
- The Physical and Geo-Political Scarcity of Critical Minerals
- Environmentalism and Green Technology
- Ways to Promote Better Sino-American Relations
- Geopolitics and global natural resources including minerals in China, Afghanistan and North Korea

In 2010, Silver coined the phrases "innovation distortion" to describe efforts to avoid the use of a given element solely because of concerns that it may be hoarded by nations with resource control of that material and "the environmentalism Catch-22" to describe the dilemma faced by the environmental movement which both supports a green technology future reliant on solar energy, wind power, electric cars and fuel cells and concurrently opposes the mining of the critical minerals from which these technologies are manufactured. In October 2014, Silver's editorial discussing these ideas was published in The Wall Street Journal.

Silver coined the phrase "sovereign monopolies" to describe nations that have a sufficient percent of the world's reserves of a given metal or mineral that they can dictate its cost and force industries requiring the metal to move production to their country to obtain preferential pricing. He created the term “Asymmetric Commodities” to describe a group of metals whose market pricing is distorted due to their scarcity allowing for single countries to control pricing. In October 2024 Silver told the New York Times that China will always control rare earth metal pricing. In April 2025 he predicted rare earth mines outside of China will always operate at the whim of China due to its ability to sell profitably below their extraction costs.
