= Sliver =

Sliver may refer to:

== Entertainment ==
- Sliver (novel), a 1991 novel by Ira Levin
  - Sliver (film), a 1993 film adaptation of the novel
  - Sliver (soundtrack), the soundtrack to the 1993 film
- "Sliver" (song), a 1990 song by Nirvana
- Sliver: The Best of the Box, a 2005 album containing tracks from the Nirvana rarities collection With The Lights Out
- Sliver (EP), a 2000 EP by Entwine
- Sliver, a slur used by the Mirror Police in Infinity Train to refer to renegade reflections such as MT (Mirror Tulip) / Lake
- Sliver, a fictional species in Magic: The Gathering

== Other uses ==
- Sliver building, a tall slender building
- Sliver (textiles), a form of fiber prepared for spinning
- Splinter, a sliver of wood that penetrates the skin
- Sliver polygon, a small unwanted polygon resulting from layer intersection in GIS

== See also ==
- Motorola SLVR L7, a mobile phone made by Motorola
- Silver (disambiguation)
