= American Elements =

Materials manufacturer and distributor

- Company type: Private
- Industry: Materials science and advanced materials
- Founded: 1997
- Founder: Michael Silver
- Headquarters: Los Angeles, California, United States
- Area served: Worldwide
- Products: Chemicals and metals
- Website: www.americanelements.com

American Elements is a global manufacturer and distributor of advanced materials. Legally "American Elements Corporation", the company is privately held, with headquarters and educational programs based in Santa Monica, California. Its research and production facilities are located in Salt Lake City, Utah; Monterrey, Mexico;China; and Manchester, UK.

== History ==
American Elements began as a toll chemical manufacturer and refiner serving U.S. mining companies by producing metal-based chemicals from their deposits. In 1998, its two largest customers, the Unocal/Molycorp rare-earth mine in Mountain Pass, California, and the Rhodia rare-earth refinery in Freeport, Texas closed, ending domestic U.S. rare-earth production. In response, the company established mining joint ventures in Inner Mongolia, China and in 1999 became one of the first post-Cold War companies to export rare-earth metals from China to the U.S. and Europe.

Over the following decade the company expanded operations to include production of all elements on the periodic table and established educational programs, scholarships and scientific conferences to educate the public on the properties and applications of the elements. In 2001, it launched its website, which is a compendium of information on the elements and advanced materials including properties, uses, safety data, and academic research.

That same year, the company established its research and development department, of which the stated goal was to develop new materials and cost effective processes in order to scale their production to bulk quantities. Materials with application promise that could not be effectively scaled were abandoned in favor of materials and technologies that had the benefit of being producible at costs in line with their commercial application. Many of the technologies and materials developed at American Elements were co-designed and co-developed with technology collaborators. The company develops and commercializes technology materials in partnership with the U.S. military and 30 percent of the Fortune 50 list of companies.

On November 12, 2020, the company announced its expansion into the life sciences industry with a new manufacturing group devoted to life science and organic chemistry products.

=== Innovations ===
The company has made several new discoveries in materials science. These include:

- Gadolinium nitrate made with heavy water (Gd(NO_{3})_{3} · 2H_{2}O) for use as a neutron "getter" during nuclear reactor maintenance
- A rare-earth compound used as a dry-film lubricant at extremely high temperatures and pressures
- A nanoscale "quick-dissolve" powder used in orally disintegrating pharmaceuticals
- A neodymium oxide-based additive to reduce yellow-green wavelength emission in incandescent light bulbs
- Zinc oxide nanoparticles incorporated as an antimicrobial agent in textiles
- A high-purity form of ytterbium(III) fluoride for use as a radiopaque material in dental composites
- A nanoscale electrolyte material in next-generation lithium-sulfur batteries.
- Iridium parts for the jewelry industry, most notably pure iridium rings and wedding bands. The company established Smithson Tennant, a new wholly owned subsidiary, in November 2016 to make and market its iridium jewelry production.

== Product lines ==
The advanced materials manufactured by the company include:

- Ultra-high-purity forms of each element
- Bulk chemicals, research compounds and catalysts
- Rare earths
- Nanomaterials such as nanoparticles and graphene
- Sputtering targets and evaporation materials
- Organometallics
- Alloys, superalloys, and metal parts
- Pharmaceutical precursors
- Fusion energy materials

== Educational programs ==
In 2006, the company established the not-for-profit American Elements Academics & Periodicals Department. This department provides information on (1) the ways elemental advanced materials are used, (2) global issues affecting the mining and production of the elements and (3) ways to improve the teaching of science at all grade levels. Since its founding, the department has sponsored thousands of conferences on materials science, the elements, mining, and physics. In 2011, it co-sponsored, along with the National Science Foundation, a four-part PBS Nova television series on materials science called "Making Stuff". The department promotes improved transparency in global metal markets. It believes future global rare-earth prices tend to move upward or downward in reaction to China's then-projected GDP (gross domestic product). The company publishes an annual Endangered Elements List naming that year's top five elements that, due to their geopolitical scarcity, pose a threat to the future of American high-technology manufacturing.

== Leadership ==
Michael Silver is the founder and CEO of American Elements. He is considered an expert in the fields of rare earths, particularly in the political and economic issues surrounding the global supply chain, and writes and speaks frequently on the subject. Silver coined the phrases "Innovation Distortion", a description of efforts to avoid the use of a given element solely because of concerns that it may be hoarded by nations with resource control of that material, and the "Environmentalist's Catch-22" to describe the dilemma faced by those who both support a green technology future reliant on solar energy, wind power, electric cars and fuel cells and concurrently oppose the mining of the critical metals from which these technologies are manufactured.

Silver is also an active philanthropist in the science and arts. In 2011, he funded and hosted a delegation from the UCLA Medical Center in Los Angeles, California to the Inner Mongolian Medical Teaching College in Baotou, China which has led to student and teacher exchanges and the development of a joint AIDS program. He is a trustee of the Natural History Museum of Los Angeles County and a member of the Board of Directors of the Institute of Contemporary Art in Los Angeles and the Sarara Initiative in Northern Kenya and the council of the Getty Research Institute in Los Angeles. He also serves on the council for the Getty Villa in Malibu and has underwritten artists in residence at the UCLA Hammer Museum. He has made in-kind donations of artwork to the National Museum of African American History & Culture in Washington, DC.
