= Silver City =

Silver City may refer to:

== Places ==
=== United States ===
- Silver City, California
- Silver City, Georgia
- Silver City, Idaho, a ghost town
- Silver City, Iowa
- Silver City, Michigan
- Silver City, Mississippi
- Silver City, Montana, a community in Lewis and Clark County
- Silver City, New Mexico
- Silver City, North Carolina
- Silver City, Nevada
- Silver City, Oklahoma, a ghost town
- Silver City, South Dakota
- Silver City, Utah, a ghost town

=== Canada ===
- Silver City, Yukon

=== Australia ===
- Silver City Highway, a highway in New South Wales
- Silver City, Christmas Island

=== Nicknames ===
- Broken Hill, New South Wales, Australia
- Cuttack, Odisha, India
- Tong'an District, Fujian, People's Republic of China
- Aberdeen, United Kingdom, the "Silver City with the Golden Sands"
- Sheffield, United Kingdom
- Las Vegas, Nevada, United States
- Meriden, Connecticut, United States
- Taunton, Massachusetts, United States
  - Silver City Galleria, a large two-story indoor shopping mall in Taunton, Massachusetts
- Schoonhoven, Netherlands

== Films ==
- Silver City (1951 film), starring Edmond O'Brien
- Silver City (1984 film), an Australian film
- Silver City (2004 film), written and directed by John Sayles
- Albuquerque (film), a 1948 American film titled Silver City in Australia

== Music ==
- Silver City (Falling Up album), 2013
- Silver City, an album by Brian Cadd, 2019
- Silver City, an album by Joe Ely, 2007
- Silver City, an album by Amy Helm, 2024
- The Silver City, an album by Jeremy Messersmith, 2008
- "(Theme from) Silver City", a 1961 song by the Ventures

== Other uses ==
- Silver City Airways, a British airline
- SilverCity, a Canadian movie theater chain run by Cineplex Entertainment
- The Silver City, a 1956 memoir by Ion Idriess
- Silver City, a 2004 book, second in The Silver Sequence by Cliff McNish
- Silver City, fictional megacity in the 2023 Indian film Ganapath

== See also ==
- Siler City, North Carolina
