= Mabel Heath Palmer =

American chiropractor and anatomist

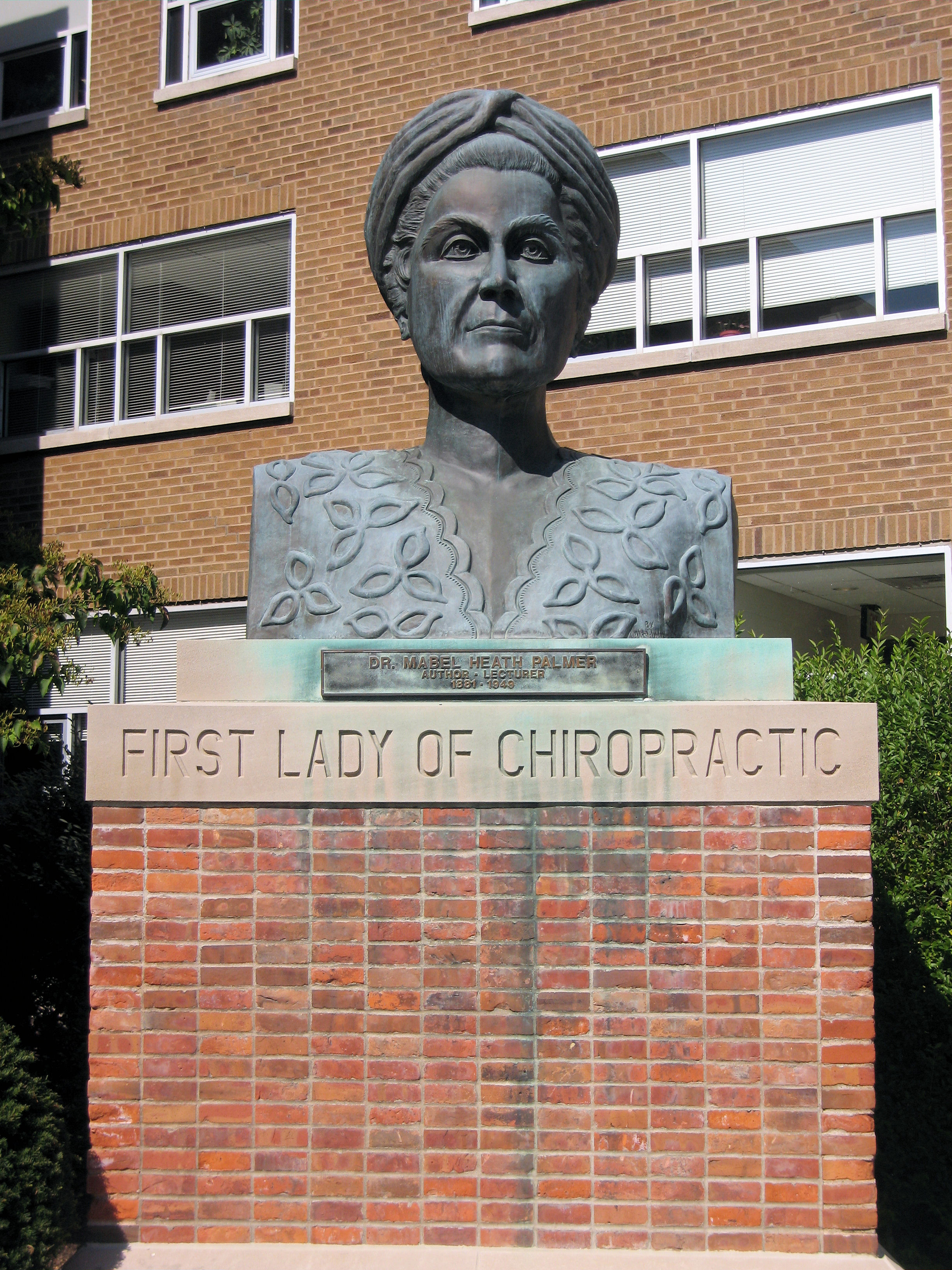
- The bronze bust of Mabel Heath Palmer in Heritage Courtyard on the Davenport Campus of Palmer College of Chiropractic.
- Born: Mabel Sarah Heath; June 5, 1885; Milan, Rock Island County, Illinois, US
- Died: March 30, 1949 (aged 63); Davenport, Scott County, Iowa, US
- Occupation(s): Chiropractor, Anatomist
- Spouse: B.J. Palmer

Mabel Heath Palmer (June 5, 1885 – March 30, 1949) was an American chiropractor and anatomist. She was married to B.J. Palmer and was known as the "First Lady of Chiropractic".

== Career ==
Palmer graduated from the Palmer School of Chiropractic in 1905. She later went to Chicago to study anatomy and dissection. In 1918, she authored Anatomy, the first anatomy textbook for chiropractic students. Palmer returned to Palmer School of Chiropractic where she taught anatomy for four decades and founded Sigma Phi Chi, the world's first chiropractic sorority.

== Personal life ==
Mabel met her husband B.J. while attending Augustana College in Rock Island, Illinois. They married on May 30, 1904, and had a son, David Daniel Palmer II on January 12, 1906. They lived at 808 Brady Street in Davenport, Iowa, which currently contains a collection of artifacts that the Palmers amassed over their lifetime of traveling the world. She wrote about these adventures and other stories from her life in her memoir Stepping Stones.

== Publications ==
- Palmer, M. H. Anatomy. 4th ed. Davenport, Iowa: Palmer School of Chiropractic, 1920.
- Palmer, M. H. Stepping Stones. Davenport, Iowa: Palmer School of Chiropractic, 1942.

== See also ==
- History of chiropractic
- List of people in chiropractic
