= The Silver City =

Memoir and historical piece written by Ion Idriess

- First edition
- Author: Ion Idriess
- Language: English
- Genre: memoir
- Publisher: Angus and Robertson
- Publication date: 1956
- Publication place: Australia
- Pages: 214

The Silver City is a 1956 memoir and historical piece written by Ion Idriess. It was based on Idriess' experiences of growing up in Broken Hill. It is also a general history of the city.
