= Rene Sylva =

Rene Donald Sylva
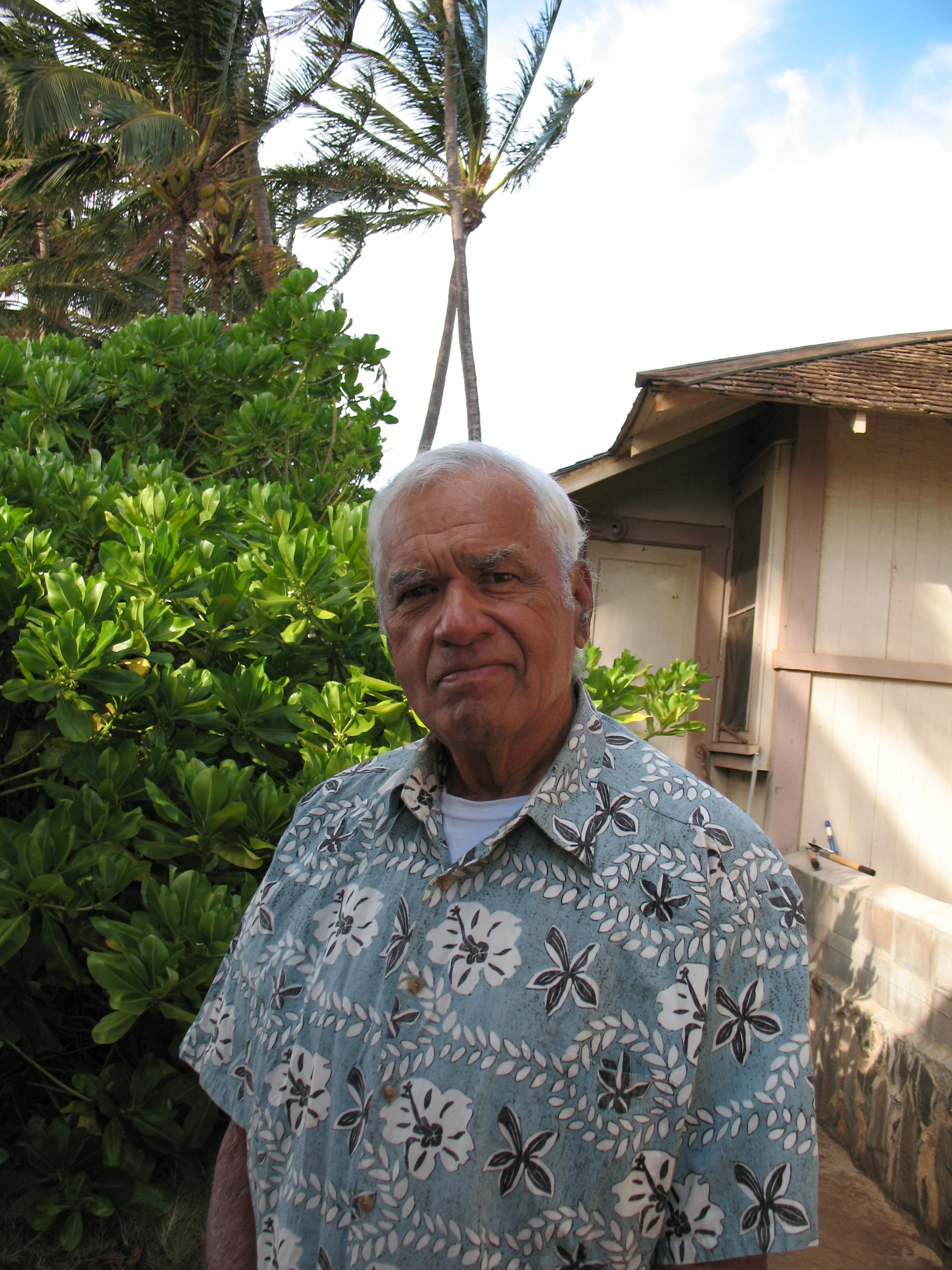
- Sylva at his home in Pāʻia, Hawaii. October 2007. Photographed by Shannon Wianecki
- Born: Rene Donald Sylva January 27, 1929; Pāʻia, Hawaii, U.S.
- Died: December 28, 2008; Pāʻia, Hawaii, U.S.
- Occupations: botanist, conservationist, turtle fisherman

Rene Sylva (January 27, 1929 – December 28, 2008) was a native Hawaiian botanist from Pāʻia, Hawaii. He was among the only native Hawaiian fishermen to speak in favor of a ban on fishing green sea turtles. After giving up a career in turtle fishing, he became involved in the conservation of native Hawaiian ecosystems. He assisted renowned botanists Otto Degener and Dr. Harold St. John in surveying remote regions of the Hawaiian Islands for native plants.

In 1976, Sylva became the caretaker of the Maui Zoological and Botanical Gardens in Kahului, Hawaii, which later became known as the Maui Nui Botanical Gardens. Gradually he shifted the garden's emphasis from exotic animals to plants unique to Maui, Molokaʻi, Lānaʻi, and Kahoʻolawe—creating the first botanical garden in the state to focus on endemic plants. He personally collected and cultivated over 200 native coastal and dry forests species. He was widely considered the authority on the native flora of Maui County.

Throughout his life, Sylva passionately defended native Hawaiian ecosystems. In an essay for the Native Hawaiian Plant Society, he wrote:

“It is a good thing to classify plants as endangered, but we must realize that this does not save them from becoming extinct. It merely gives them paper protection. I recall when the first plant was entered on the endangered species list on April 26, 1978. It is still on that list today. As far as I know, no plant has ever come off the Endangered Species List. The only way for a plant to be removed from that list is to become extinct. To me, this is a disgraceful and insulting way of saving Hawaiian plants.”

He was active with many volunteer organizations, including the Honokowai restoration project, and the reforestation of Kahoʻolawe until suffering from a stroke in 2006. He is credited with mentoring numerous conservationists, including native plant nursery owner, Anna Palomino, and parataxonomists Forest and Kim Starr. For his efforts to conserve rare and endangered flora and fauna in Hawaii, Tetramolopium sylvae, an endangered species in the family Asteraceae, was named in his honor.

Sylva served as a tank driver for the U.S. military during the Korean War.
