= Silvers =

Silvers may refer to:

== People ==
- Abraham Silvers (born 1934), American statistician
- Brandon Silvers (born 1994), American football player
- Cathy Silvers (born 1961), American actress and daughter of Phil Silvers
- Damon Silvers, American lawyer
- David Silvers (born 1979), American politician
- Dean Silvers, American film director
- Diana Silvers (born 1997), American actor
- Herbert Ferber Silvers (1906–1991), American sculptor and painter
- Louis Silvers (1889–1954), American film score composer
- Mark Silvers (born 1986), American golfer
- Michael Silvers, sound editor (Pixar)
- Phil Silvers (1911–1985), American entertainer and comedy actor
- Robert B. Silvers (1929-2017), American editor (The New York Review of Books)
- Robert P. Silvers, American politician
- William Silvers, American painter

== Other uses ==
- Albuquerque Silvers, an American basketball team
- Crab Silvers
- Golden Silvers, an English band
- Silvers, a local term for Coho salmon (Oncorhynchus kisutch)
- Silvers Circus, Australian circus
- Silvers, term for aluminized Fire proximity suit
- Silvers Rayleigh, character in the One Piece manga and anime series

== See also ==
- Silver (disambiguation)
- The Sylvers, a family musical group
