= Silva (disambiguation) =

Silva, is a surname in Portuguese-speaking countries.

Silva may also refer to:

== Arts and entertainment ==
- Silva, a character in the operetta Die Csárdásfürstin
  - Silva (film), a 1944 Soviet musical film based on the operetta
  - Silva (1981 film), directed by Yan Frid
- Silva, a Shaman King character
- Silva (Spanish strophe), a form of poetry
- Raoul Silva, a character played by Javier Bardem in the 2012 action film Skyfall

== Places ==
- Silva (Barcelos), Portugal
- Silva e Águas Vivas, Miranda do Douro, Portugal, formerly the parishes of Silva and Águas Vivas
- São Julião e Silva, Valença, Portugal
- Silva, Missouri, U.S.
- Parish of Silva (Tongowoko County), New South Wales, Australia

== Other uses ==
- Silva (footballer, born 1958), full name Luís Carlos da Silva Matos, Brazilian football forward
- Silva (footballer, born 1981), full name Kleber Rogério do Carmo Silva, Brazilian football midfielder
- Silva (footballer, born 1984), full name Weliander Silva Nascimento, Brazilian football midfielder
- Silva (footballer, born 1995), full name Adniellyson da Silva Oliveira, Brazilian football midfielder
- Silva (musician), full name Lúcio Silva de Souza, Brazilian singer-songwriter and musician
- Silva (given name), a Latvian and Armenian feminine given name
- Silva Batuta, full name Walter Machado da Silva, Brazilian football forward
- Silva compass, outdoor navigational equipment by Silva Sweden AB
- Silva International Investments, a London-based investment company
- SILVA ribosomal RNA database, in microbiology
- Silva SD, a Spanish football team

== See also ==
- Sylva (disambiguation)
- Silver (disambiguation)
- Silva Method, a self-help system developed by José Silva
- SiIvaGunner, a YouTube channel which has a capital I instead of a lowercase L
