= Sylva Lauerová =

Czech writer and poet (born 1962)

Sylva Lauerova
- Sylva Lauerová
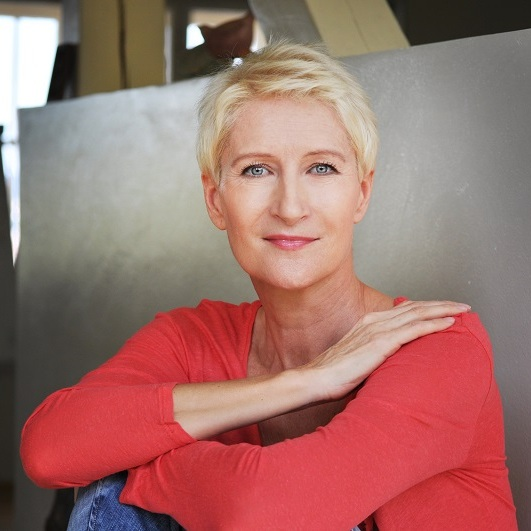
- Lauerová in 2014
- Born: June 10, 1962 (age 64); Brno
- Education: Masaryk University
- Occupations: Writer and poet
- Writing career
- Notable works: The Toy, Michael2007, The Slave, The Queens of Blackberries and Tears, Jumaroro, A Harsh Ovation, The Lurker
- Website: sylvalauerova.cz/en

Signature
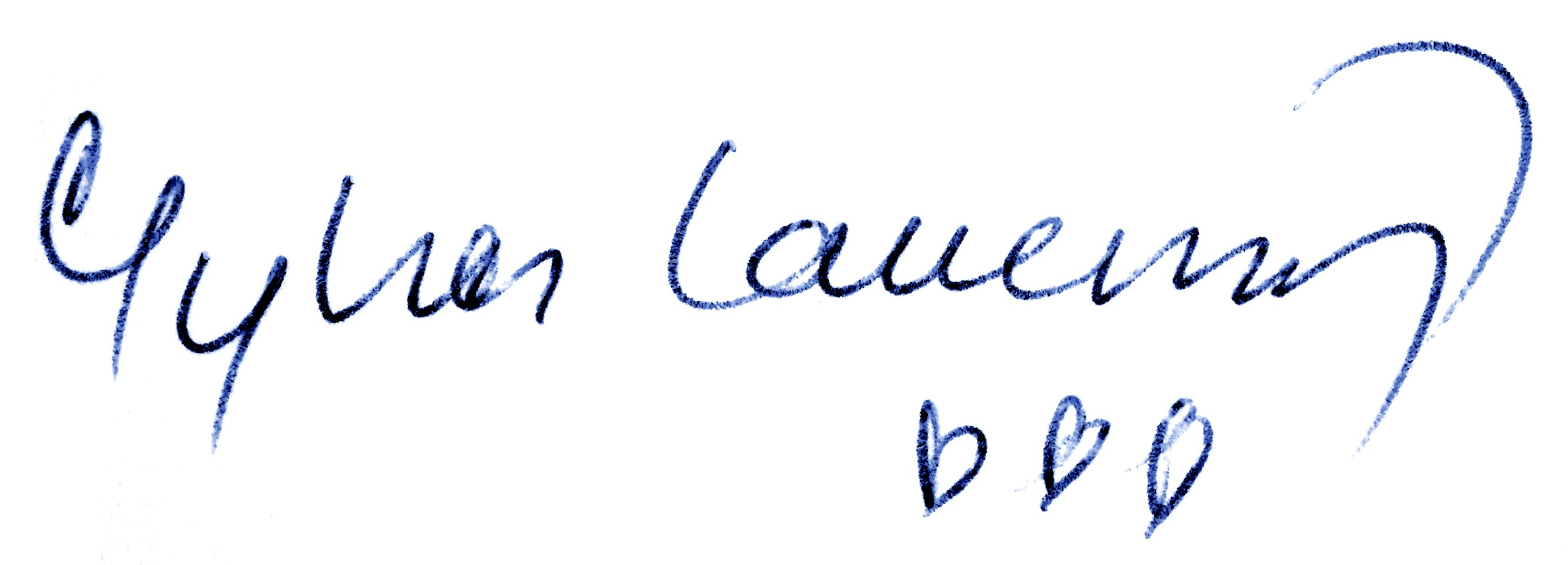

Sylva Lauerová (born June 10, 1962, in Brno, Czechoslovakia) is a Czech writer and poet.

== Education and personal life ==
Sylva Lauerová studied at Masarykova univerzita in Brno and graduated with a JD, although she chose not to practice law. She is married to a German architect specialising in tropical residential architecture. Since 1997, she has mostly resided in the Seychelles.

== Literary style ==
Her work varies between purely commercial literature and artistic projects. The main features of her literary works are a suggestive style, characterized by a dynamic, modern, and very distinctive approach to language, including aspects of authenticity, openness when describing intimate scenes, and insights into the psyche of the main characters. Her style draws the reader into the story and allows them to be an interested, silent observer, sharing the same perspective as the main characters in the story.

== Works ==
=== Bondye i lanmour (2005) ===
Seychellois Creole and English meditation CD.

=== The Toy (2007) ===
A commercial erotic novel, The Toy has appeared twice in the Top 10 list of bestselling books in the Czech Republic. ISBN 978-80-254-0394-5

=== Michael2007 (2008) ===
A philosophical-religious riddle, it combines prose and poetry while considering the real and immaterial world. In the prose section entitled "Manual for large feathered friends", Lauerová introduces readers to the 'theory' – the principle of Angelic beings here on earth. The second part contrasts with this through the theory of 'practice'; two stories written in verse leave space for readers to put together the whole puzzle – hinted at in the poems – by themselves. The book became the inspiration for the Michael2007 project, an exhibition of works of art which took place in September 2008 in the former "Thamova" factory in Karlin, Prague. Seven young artists, most of whom went on to be masters in their field, exhibited their pieces of art inspired by the nine poems from the book. ISBN 978-80-254-2340-0

=== The Slave (2009) ===
An intimate psychological BDSM drama in which the desire to control others is mixed with the desire to be dominated and humiliated. ISBN 978-80-254-5275-2

=== The Queens of Blackberries and Tears (2010) ===
"44 poets, 421 poems, one love" Compiled by Sylva Lauerová. A collection of Czech female love poetry for the 21st century, it is one of the most comprehensive publications (560 pages) of contemporary poetry written by women, both professionals and amateurs, to appear in the last decade in the Czech Republic. ISBN 978-80-254-7069-5

=== Jumaroro (2011) ===
A mystical novel combines elements of a detective story and travelogue. The exotic environment of the Amazon Basin features in this mystical story with a surprising culmination; Jumaroro combines suspense, exoticism and mystery. As the plot develops, the book poses numerous questions; the reader's imagination, curiosity, and expectations are aroused, as well as a feeling of something unexplainable, right up until the dramatic ending. Jumaroro is credited as the novel that introduced Lauerová's work to a wider audience. ISBN 978-80-904933-0-8

=== A Harsh Ovation (2012) ===
This second poetry collection is a selection of poems from 2010 to 2012. The paradoxical title itself suggests the direction and content of the verses, which include painful and depressing themes. In her poems, Lauerová deliberately ignores superficial and earthly subjects; the focus of her poetry is the human soul and, as in the first collection of poems Michael2007, there are deep spiritual overtones. The poems are accompanied by full-colour illustrations by Monica Sedlářová, a Czech artist currently living in England. This edition is limited to 1000 copies and each one has been signed by the author. ISBN 978-80-904933-2-2

=== The Lurker (2012) ===
A chamber thriller partly set in Prague's underground Metro system which tells the story of a mysterious and ugly man without a past. As usual, the dénouement is surprising and readers will again be confronted with the author's fascination with the depths of the human mind and an empathetic insight into the feelings of others. ISBN 978-80-904933-3-9

=== Sexy Strategy (2015) ===
After a three-year hiatus, Lauerová returned with Sexy Strategy. Released in collaboration with Mladá Fronta publishing house, it brought something completely new to the Czech literary scene. A fresh and witty read, exploring the darker reaches of the female soul and offering original and frank advice, it is also an intelligent guide for the modern woman. Sylva Lauerová accurately takes aim within her own ranks, setting her sights not only on the weaknesses of the female psyche, but also those of modern males (the Experimental Atlas of Men) by again refusing to shy away from even the most intimate topics and instead heading straight to the heart of the matter. Within two weeks of its publication, the book became a bestseller, ranking among the top 10 best-selling books in the Czech Republic. ISBN 978-80-204-3878-2

=== The Lurker, a graphic novel (2016) ===
The graphic novel version of The Lurker is inspired by the chamber thriller of the same name, previously released in 2012, and introduces a brand-new type of superhero, completely different to those we know from the popular Marvel Comics. The appeal of this story is enhanced by the backdrop of Prague, and set in an anonymous and wild metropolis where the underground metro is not only the most popular means of transport but the axis in which the fates of its inhabitants are intertwined; the fates of those who have yet to realise how a brief encounter with a strange, taciturn and disfigured man will change their lives forever. ISBN 978-80-87801-06-2

=== The Experimental Atlas of Men (2019) ===
This gender-specific book was developed for readers in cooperation with Albatros Media’s CPress publishing division. Richly illustrated, the Experimental Atlas of Men is divided into nine classes featuring several dozen species of men to be found in and around the Czech Republic. The book successfully pastiches more serious scientific publications by focusing on the prevalence and significant features of the sampled endemic species of men, and provides breeders with valuable advice and practical care tips. The book’s accompanying illustrations are by Tomáš Kučerovský, a leading Czech artist. ISBN 978-80264-2818-3

== Media, projects ==
Sylva Lauerová is a regular contributor to Czech journals (e.g. Marianne, Psychology Today), presents and hosts artistic events (Shooting Fashion Stars, Fatamorgana – Brussels Dream), and is the founder and supporter of a wide range of artistic projects (exhibitions, happenings, experimental fashion shows, etc.).

- Choose Yourself 2019 - the exclusive calendar of contemporary Czech jewellery was created in cooperation with the Czech Fashion Council, a non-profit organization that supports the development and promotion of original Czech fashion both in the Czech Republic and around the world. Photographed in Milan by the world-renowned photographer Karel Losenický, these images capture the perfect interplay of a boldly-expressive female personality with outstanding pieces by contemporary Czech jewellery designers.
- Fatamorgana – a fashion show for the Brussels Dream exhibition (Prague 2008, Brno 2009), in collaboration with OLO-Dressing and the fashion designer Jakub Polanka
- DRESSING Portfolio – project for a new magazine compiling contemporary Czech visual arts
- IMPERSONED – during the summer of 2009 the first collection of the IMPERSONED project was created. Sylva, as the initial and main catalyst to this project chose to cooperate with the fashion designer Vojtěch Novotný and stylist OLO Křížová. It is a project of fashion collections tailor-made for famous Czech personalities which enhance their character. The first collection was presented in autumn 2009 at the Designblok 2009 event in Prague.
- Poetic triptych – a project presented in 2010 combining poetry, music and a short film.
- Checkmate – theatrical clothing prepared and presented for the OLO-DRESSING brand in cooperation with Zuzana Kubíčková, Dana Bezděková and OLO. The collection was presented at Designblok10 at a fashion show also starring Sylva Lauerová as 'The White Queen'.
- AQUO, Ivana Kaňovská – a collection of avant-garde theatrical headwear by fashion designer Ivana Kaňovská, presented at Prague Fashion Weekend 2012, and inspired by the exotic novel Jumaroro.
