= Sylva Ashworth =

American chiropractor

- Born: November 27, 1874; Peru, Nebraska
- Died: June 6, 1958 (aged 83)
- Other names: "Grand Old Lady of Chiropractic"
- Occupation: Chiropractor

Sylva Ashworth (1874–1958) was an American chiropractor, who played a significant role in developing the chiropractic field. She was the founder of the Universal Chiropractors' Association (now known as American Chiropractic Association). After suffering from many health issues, she tried chiropractic as a last resort and found that it worked completely for her. She then worked as a chiropractic until the age of 79.

== Biography ==
Ashworth is often referred to as the "Grand Old Lady of Chiropractic", as she was the matriarch of a long line of the Cleveland family of notable chiropractors. Sylva was a single mother of four children, and she suffered severe health problems, including "valvular" heart trouble, diabetes with leg ulcers, cystic tumors, and dropsy; due to these issues, she was not expected to survive more than a few months when she first tried chiropractic as a last resort from a local Nebraska chiropractor. Her recovery was considered complete and inspired her to devote her life to the chiropractic field. This led her to enroll at the Palmer School of Chiropractic in Davenport, Iowa, and she graduated in May 1910 at the age of 35. Her long legacy of accomplishments and contributions to the profession started immediately after returning to her home state of Nebraska, where she started private practice and continued to practice until the age of 79 (in 1954). Her accomplishments include a reputation as a charitable practitioner delivering chiropractic care to death row inmates of the Nebraska penitentiary in Lincoln, 1918 Influenza victims, and many others in her community. In 1921, the Lincoln Herald credited her with the largest chiropractic practice in the state, and one of the largest in the United States. Ashworth is recognized as the founder of the Universal Chiropractors Association (1918), now known as the American Chiropractic Association, which was initially created to defend chiropractors from medical prosecution. She is also the founder of the International Chiropractic Association (ICA), and the Chiropractic Research Foundation in 1944, known today as the Foundation for Chiropractic Education & Research (FCER).

== Sylva Ashworth Scholarship ==
The Sylva Ashworth Scholarship was set up by Dr. Nalyn Marcus at the Sherman College of Chiropractic, with the aim of supporting single mothers looking to become doctors of chiropractic.
