= B. J. Palmer =

American chiropractor (1882–1961)

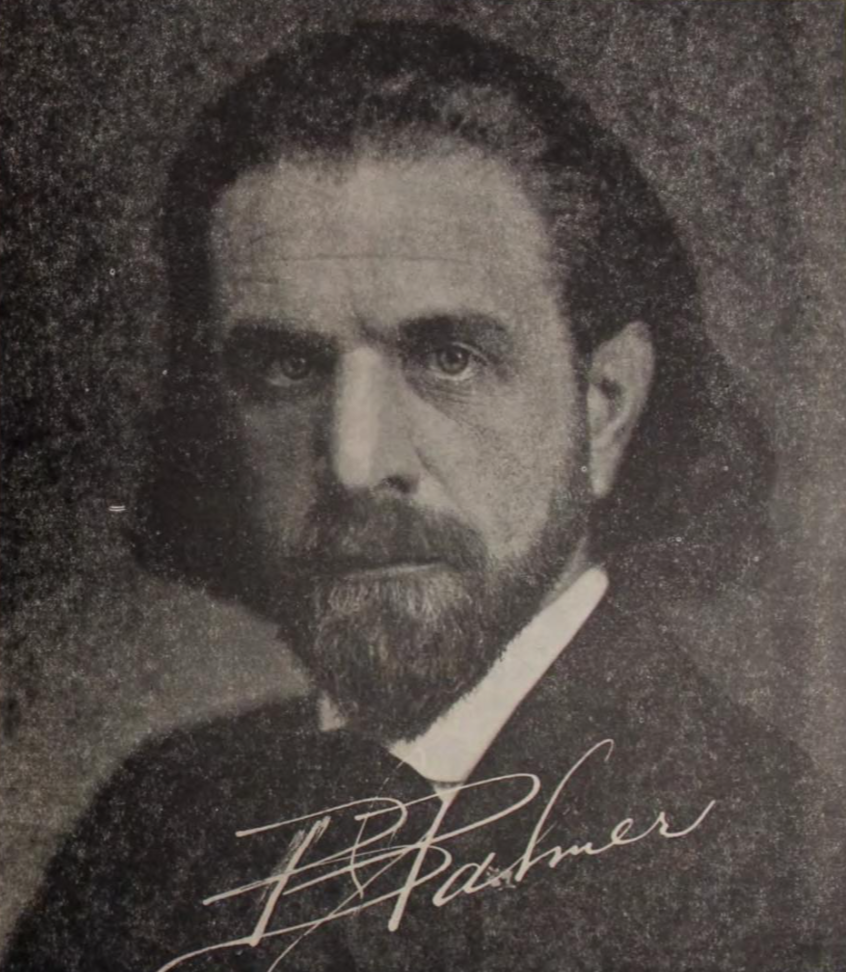
- Palmer in c. 1925
- Born: Bartlett Joshua Palmer; September 10, 1881; What Cheer, Iowa
- Died: May 27, 1961 (aged 79); Sarasota, Florida
- Occupation: Chiropractor
- Spouse: Mabel Heath
- Children: 1
- Father: Daniel David Palmer

Bartlett Joshua Palmer (September 10, 1881 – May 27, 1961) was an American chiropractor. He was the son of Daniel David Palmer (D. D.), the founder of chiropractic, and became known as the "Developer" of chiropractic.

== Early life ==
B. J. Palmer was born on September 10, 1881, the son of Daniel David Palmer (or "D.D."), the founder of chiropractic, in What Cheer, Iowa, The Palmer family of six resided in the back of a grocery store that D.D. operated. In 1885, D.D.'s wife became sick and died, after which D.D. remarried several times. When D.D. had settled with a new wife, he moved the family to Letts, Iowa, and he worked as a schoolteacher and a magnetic healer, developing chiropractic.

== Chiropractic career ==
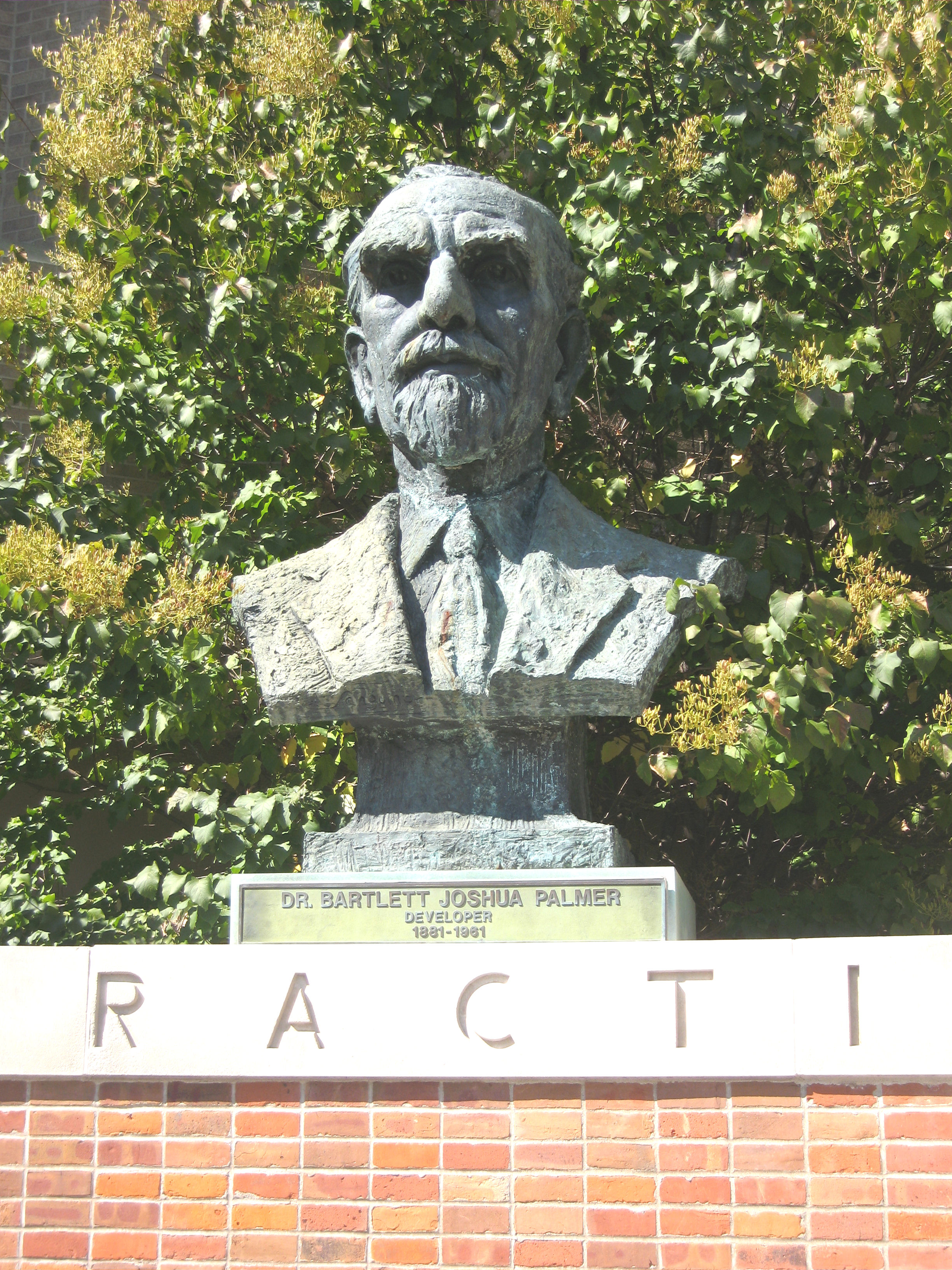
A bust of Bartlett Joshua Palmer

On May 30, 1904, B.J. married a woman named Mabel Heath. Both worked as chiropractors and instructors at Palmer College. Mabel Heath Palmer had a heavy load of students and taught mostly anatomy classes. B.J. Palmer ran his research clinics in Davenport for 16 years and eventually became convinced that upper cervical spine was the key to health. He modified the Palmer School of Chiropractic curriculum to reflect his new ideas. Palmer was an advocate for the use of the Neurocalometer and X-ray machines.

On January 12, 1906, their only son, David Daniel Palmer was born. In keeping with his educational efforts for the profession, he became known as "The Educator." They had an estranged relationship for a number of years when David Daniel decided to attend University of Pennsylvania and later its Wharton School of Business. David explained that he knew that he would one day be in charge of the school, and wanted an education in business to allow him to better manage the college. He also graduated from Palmer as a Doctor of Chiropractic.

In 1922, Palmer purchased a local radio station, WOC (whose call letters were thought to stand for "World Of Chiropractic" or "World of Chiropractic" but in reality these call letters were assigned by the government to the previous owner of the station, Robert Karlowa of Rock Island, Illinois). Palmer began using the station to market chiropractic, as well as to broadcast farm, sports and weather reports. Ronald Reagan, future President of the United States and actor, was given his first broadcast job by Dr. Palmer to broadcast sports for WOC. A second station in Des Moines, WHO, (whose call letters were similarly thought to stand for "With Hands Only") was purchased from Bankers Life in 1930; however, neither station ever used either of the phrases in any of their promotions. Television stations were later added under the same call letters.

Following with the extensive world travels that was the trend in the 1920s, B.J., Mabel, and David traveled through most of Asia. He later wrote a book called Round the World with B.J. that would detail those trips and the people they met. He also published and read some of these stories in the Palmer School's newspaper and on WOC radio station.

Mabel Heath died in 1949 from stroke complications. In 1951 B. J. purchased a home on St. Armands Key in Sarasota, Florida, where he lived out his final years. He died in 1961 due to intestinal cancer. His son assumed the role of President of Palmer School of Chiropractic after his father's death.

== B. J. and Mabel Palmer residence ==
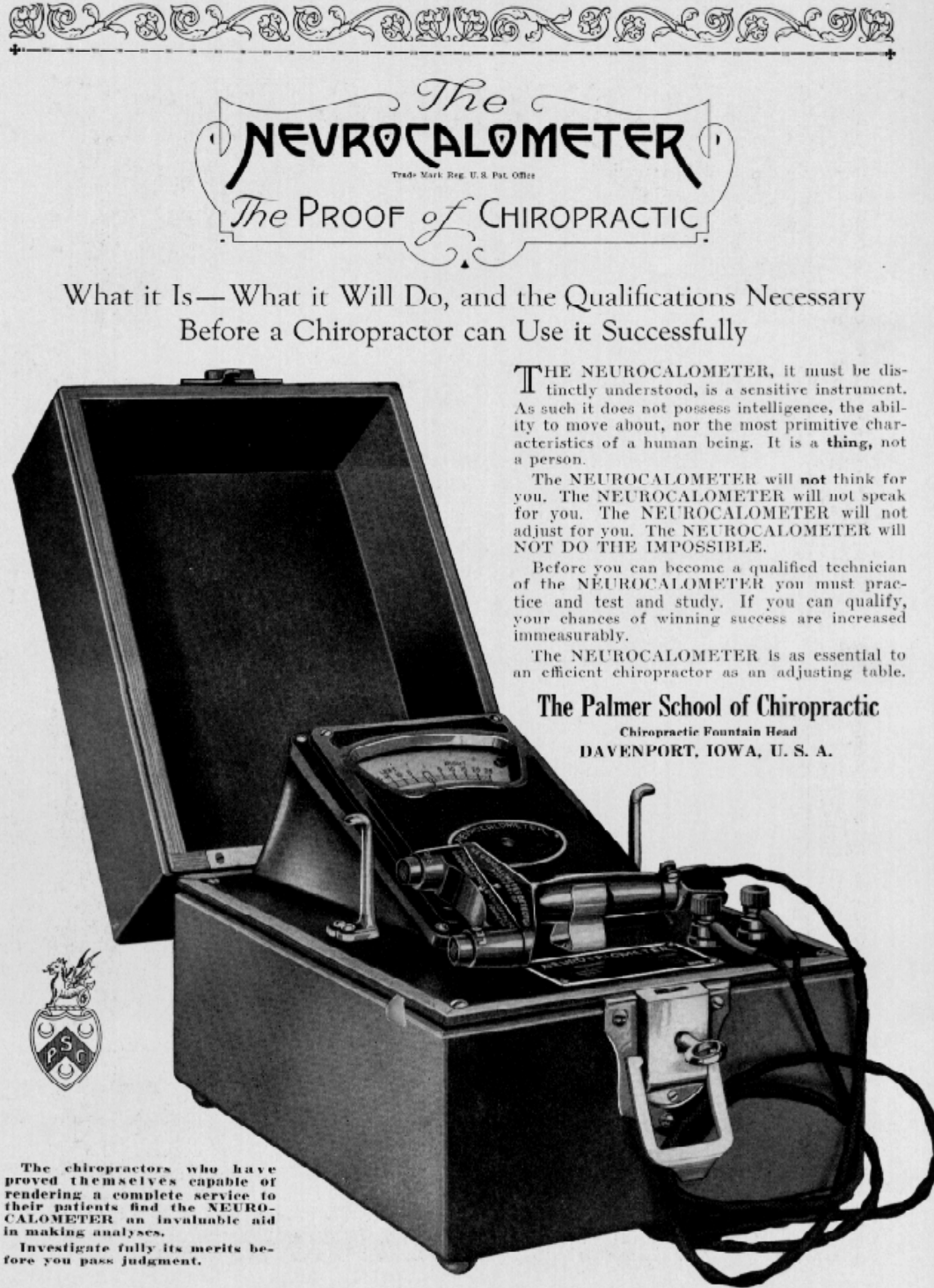
1925 advertisement for the Neurocalometer from Palmer School of Chiropractic

The house that B. J. and Mabel Palmer lived in is located at 808 Brady Street, Davenport, Iowa. It contains many of the souvenirs collected on their tours of the world. The Palmers added on a porch addition surrounding the original house in the 1920s to help hold their extensive collection. This home is known as The Palmer Mansion and is owned and run by Palmer College of Chiropractic. It was placed on the United States National Register of Historic Places in 1948, and tours of the Mansion area provided by the College and are available to the public

B. J. Palmer's winter home in Sarasota, Florida, is located at 342 No. Washington Drive on St. Armands Key. The home contains many original artifacts, including his Roycroft furniture, lamp and clown collection, bedroom furniture, death certificate, and a collection of framed documents.

== Questioned involvement in father's death ==
On August 27, 1913, an incident occurred during a homecoming parade. It resulted in a lawsuit for attempted murder, filed against him by his father. The allegation that B.J. deliberately hit his father with a car on that occasion followed B.J. Palmer for the better part of a generation. A 2008 book, Trick or Treatment, repeats the story and states that in 1913 B.J. Palmer ran over his father at a homecoming parade for the Palmer School of Chiropractic in Davenport, Iowa. Weeks later, D.D. Palmer died in Los Angeles. The official cause of death was recorded as typhoid. The book Trick or Treatment remarked "it seems more likely that his death was a direct result of injuries caused by his son." There was speculation it was not an accident, but rather a case of patricide. They had become bitter rivals over the leadership of chiropractic. B.J. Palmer resented his father for the way he treated his family, stating that his father beat three of his children with straps and was so much involved in chiropractic that "he hardly knew he had any children". D.D. claimed that his son B.J. struck him with his car. Chiropractic historian Joseph C. Keating, Jr. has described the patricide interpretation of the event as a myth and "absurd on its face" and cites an eyewitness who recalled that D.D. was not struck by B.J.'s car but, rather, had stumbled. He also says "Joy Loban, DC, executor of D.D.'s estate, voluntarily withdrew a civil suit claiming damages against B.J. Palmer, and that several grand juries repeatedly refused to bring criminal charges against the son." D.D. Palmer died October 20, 1913. One proposed cause of the accusations and responses was the competition between the schools (Palmer's and Universal's).
