= Parker University =

College

Coordinates: 32.879639°N 96.893174°W

- Former name: Parker College of Chiropractic (1982-2011)
- Type: Private university
- Established: 1982
- President: William E. Morgan
- Students: 977 (2016)
- Undergraduates: 229 (2016)
- Postgraduates: 748 (2016)
- Location: Dallas, Texas, United States
- Mascot: Parker Patriot
- Website: www.parker.edu

Parker University is a private university focused on healthcare and located in Dallas, Texas. The university operates a second chiropractic clinic in Irving, Texas, the site of its first campus. It is accredited by the Southern Association of Colleges and Schools, the Council on Chiropractic Education, and the Commission of Massage Therapy Accreditation.

Founded in 1982 by James Parker as Parker College of Chiropractic, the school was renamed Parker University in 2011. As of 2016, the school had 977 students.
