= Inner Mongolia Medical University =

University in Inner Mongolia, China

Inner Mongolia Medical University (Chinese: 内蒙古医科大学) is a medical university in Inner Mongolia, China under the authority of the Autonomous Region government. It is located in Hohhot, the capital city of Inner Mongolia Autonomous Region. It was established in 1956. It was renamed from Inner Mongolia Medical College in 2012.

The main campus is downtown about 400 m west of the central square on the north side.

The new campus was opened in 2006: 35 km west of downtown and 8 km west of JinChuan. Teachers, except foreign teachers, take the free university bus from downtown to the new campus. It is a 45-minute ride.
