= Palmer College of Chiropractic =

Private chiropractic college in Davenport, Iowa, US

Coordinates: 41.528547°N 90.574250°W

- Former names: The Palmer School and Cure
- Type: Private chiropractic college
- Established: 1897; 129 years ago
- Endowment: $87.85 million (2025)
- Chancellor: Dennis M. Marchiori
- Location: Davenport, Iowa and Port Orange, Florida, United States
- Website: www.palmer.edu

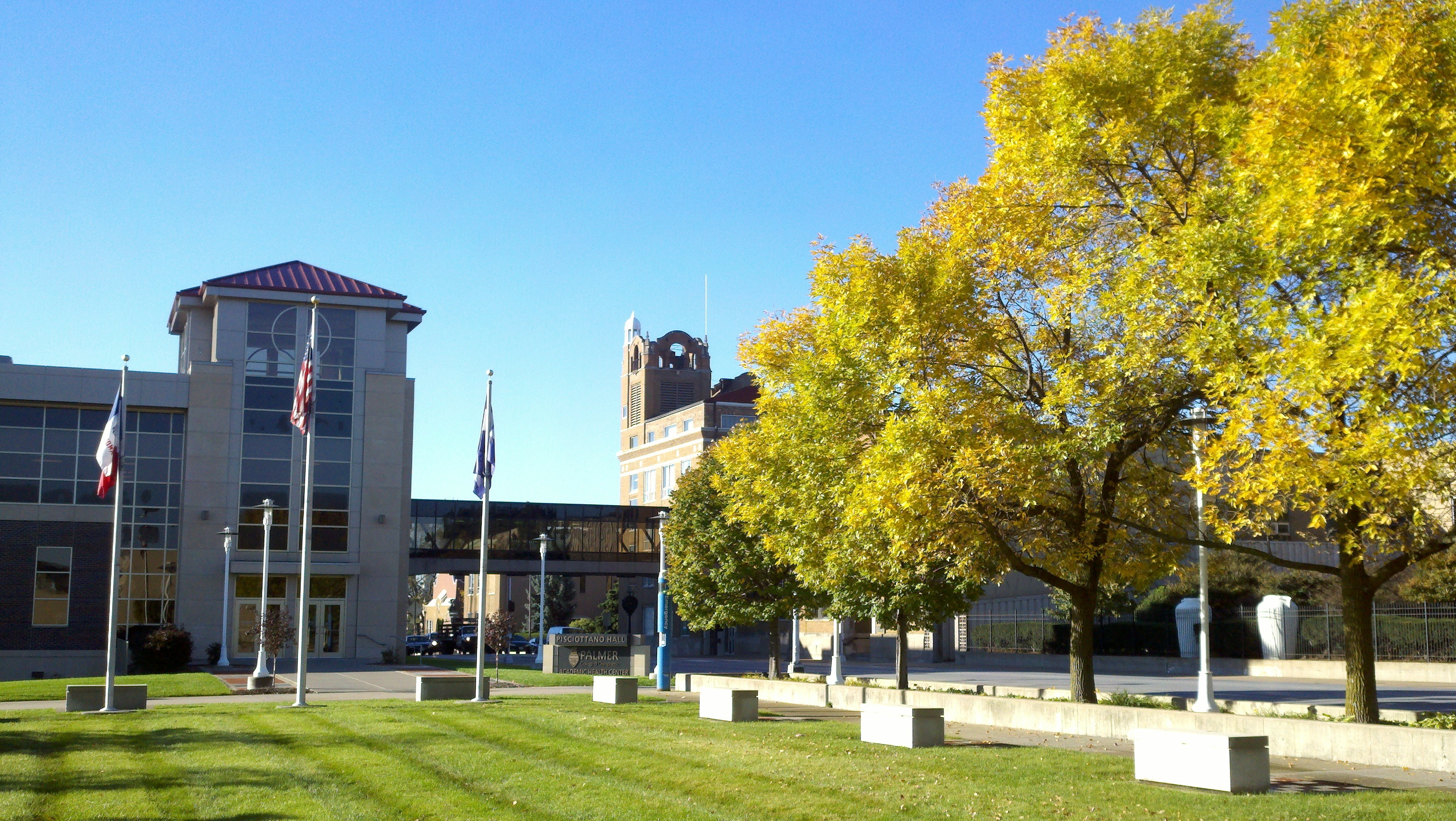
The first chiropractic school in the world in Davenport, Iowa

Palmer College of Chiropractic is a private chiropractic college with its main campus in Davenport, Iowa. It was established in 1897 by Daniel David Palmer and was the first school of chiropractic in the world. The college's name was originally the Palmer School and Cure and later became the Palmer School of Chiropractic. Most early chiropractic schools were founded by Palmer alumni.

== History ==
The Palmer School of Chiropractic was begun by Daniel David Palmer, who is the Founder of Chiropractic. His son, B. J. Palmer, is considered the Developer of Chiropractic because he greatly expanded the scope of the school and laid the foundation for the campus and profession that exists today. He assumed responsibility for the Palmer School of Chiropractic in 1904. According to the Palmer College website, B. J. Palmer's "contributions included extensive research, improved methods of spinal adjusting and analysis, higher standards for chiropractic education, and increased appreciation for chiropractic worldwide".

After B. J. Palmer died in 1961, his son David D. Palmer became president of the school and changed its name to Palmer College of Chiropractic, which was one of the steps leading to the school's accreditation. "Dr. Dave", as he was known, modernized the campus, established non-profit status for the college, and organized the Palmer College of Chiropractic International Alumni Association. The college received accreditation from the Council on Chiropractic Education and the North Central Association of Colleges and Schools largely through his leadership, but not until after he died in 1978.

The college opened campuses in San Jose, California in 1980 and in Port Orange, Florida in 2002. The college was once encompassed by the Palmer Chiropractic University System. While it is no longer a university system, Palmer is one college with three campuses, with the main campus located in Davenport, Iowa, and branch campuses (the San Jose campus and the Port Orange campus). The college is a non-profit organization governed by a single Board of Trustees.

=== Davenport, Iowa campus ===
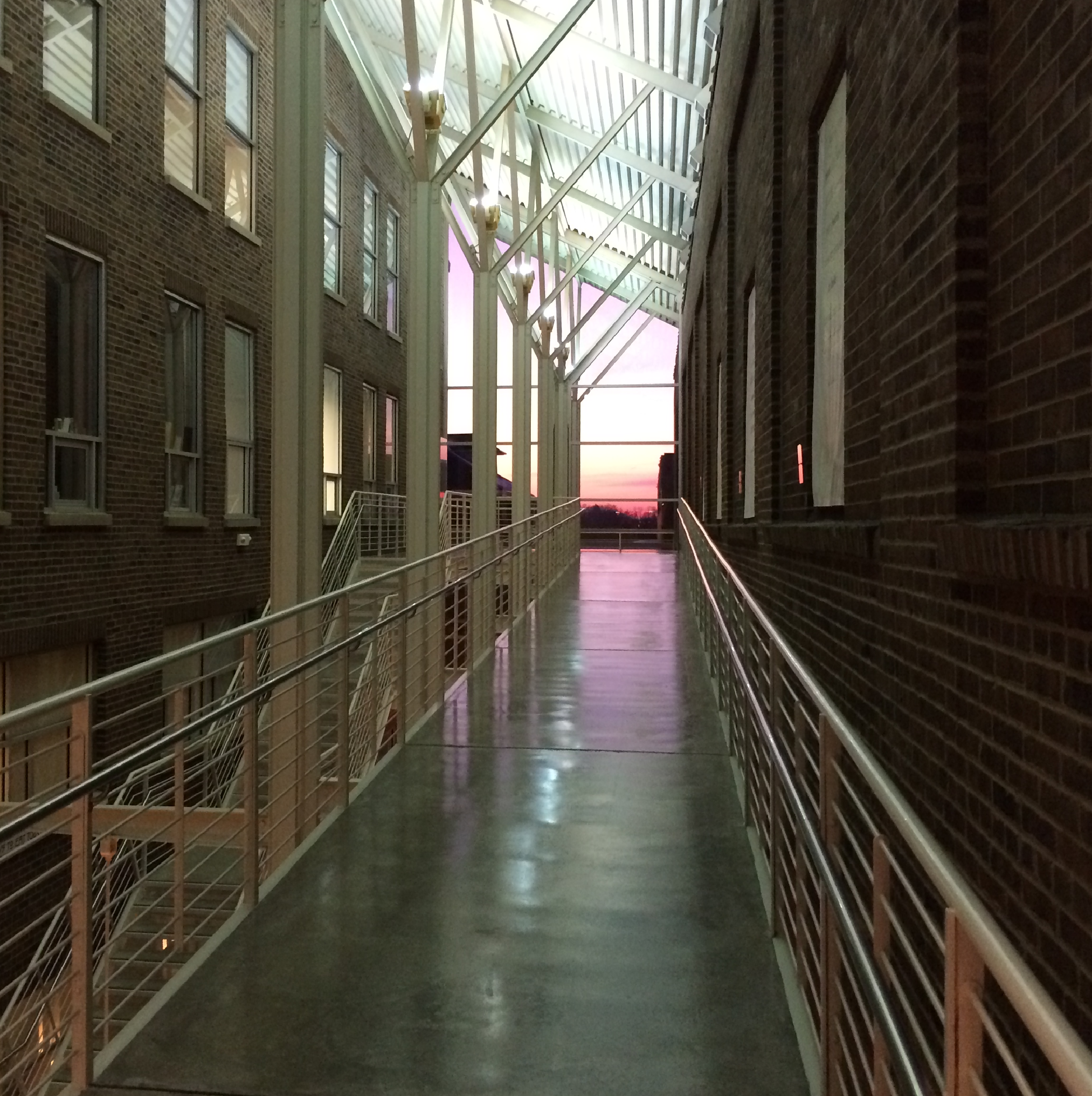
Palmer College of Chiropractic, Davenport, Iowa campus

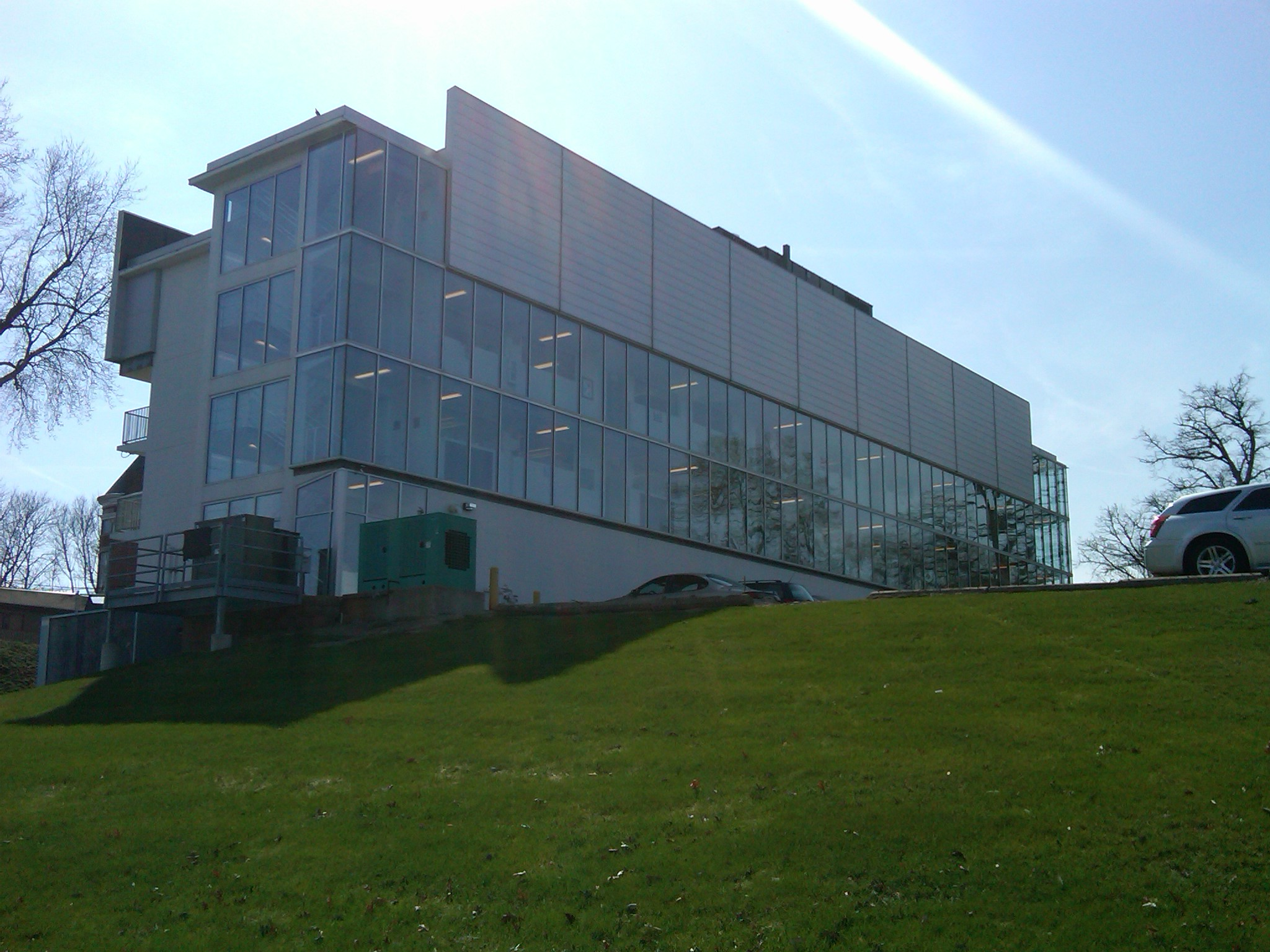
Palmer Center for Chiropractic Research, William and Jo Harris Building Davenport, Iowa

The Palmer Center for Chiropractic Research was established in 1995 and is also located on the Davenport, Iowa campus in the William and Jo Harris Building. The Palmer Center for Chiropractic Research is the largest and most highly funded research effort in the chiropractic educational community. The Palmer Center for Chiropractic Research encompasses all three Palmer campuses and employs a Vice Chancellor of Research and Health Policy, a research director, ten full-time faculty, eight associate faculty, and 23 administrative and professional staff with a total annual budget of approximately $5 million per year, much of which is supported by grants and contracts.

The campus consists of new as well as historic buildings. The Palmer College of Chiropractic Academic Health Center (opened in 2007), which contains the College's outpatient clinic, welcome center, Clinical Radiology Department (featuring digital radiology), Chiropractic Rehabilitation and Sports Injury Department, and the Clinical Learning Resource Center. Other buildings include the David D. Palmer Health Sciences Library, the Memorial Building (the oldest building on campus), Campus Center, B.J. and Mabel Palmer Residence, Vickie Anne Palmer Hall, among others.

=== Port Orange campus ===
Palmer's Florida campus is located in Port Orange, Florida. The Palmer Port Orange campus was opened in 2002.

=== San Jose campus ===
Palmer's West campus was located in San Jose, California. The San Jose Campus closed in June 2025. The Palmer board decided in mid-March 2022 to close the campus due to the "escalation of the building lease, the high cost of living, the employment market, and the college's cost to deliver the program in California compelled the decision to phase out the West campus".

== Accreditation ==
The Doctor of Chiropractic Degree Program of Palmer College of Chiropractic’s campuses is accredited by the Commission on Accreditation of the Council on Chiropractic Education (CCE).

Palmer College of Chiropractic’s campuses are regionally accredited by the Higher Learning Commission of the North Central Association of Colleges and Schools.

== Athletics ==
=== Palmer College Dragons Hockey ===
Palmer College of Chiropractic men's hockey team, known as the Palmer Dragons, is part of the Mid-America Collegiate Hockey Association (MACHA) and American Collegiate Hockey Association (ACHA) Division II.

=== Palmer College Rugby Football Club ===
Palmer College Rugby Football Club (RFC) was established in 1960. Palmer College RFC offers both partial and full Rugby scholarships for tuition.

==== Men’s Rugby Team ====
Palmer College of Chiropractic men's rugby team, known as Palmer College Dragons, currently plays in the competitive Midwest Division II conference.

National Titles: 1972, 1973, 1978, and 1979
Final Four USA Rugby Championships: Fourth place in 1995, 2001, and 2010, and third place in 2011 and 2012.

==== Women's Rugby Team ====
Palmer College of Chiropractic women's rugby team, also known as Palmer College Dragons, plays in the competitive Midwest Division II conference.

=== Intramurals ===
Intramural sports, available to the Palmer Community, include flag football, softball, basketball, bowling, pickleball, and volleyball.

== Outreach clinics ==
Palmer College of Chiropractic has Palmer Community Outreach Clinics, at all campus locations, to serve economically and socially disadvantaged community members at reduced or no cost expenses (who meet financial need requirements). The Quad Cities area has two outreach clinics located in Davenport, Iowa and Moline, Illinois. The Daytona Beach area has one outreach clinic located in South Daytona, Florida. The South Bay area has five satellite outreach clinics. These outreach clinics improve opportunities for student interns and provide chiropractic services for patients visiting the facilities.

== Notable alumni ==
- A. A. Adams, chiropractor and former member of the Washington House of Representatives
- Sylva Ashworth, a chiropractor, who played a significant role in developing the chiropractic field
- Frank Farkas, former member of the Florida House of Representatives
- James A. Glisson, state legislator in Florida
- Clarence Gonstead, creator of the Gonstead technique, and founder of one of the largest ever chiropractic clinics in Mount Horeb, Wisconsin
- Ben Hansen, a chiropractor elected to the Nebraska Legislature in 2018.
- Mabel Heath Palmer, first female chiropractor, author of the first anatomy textbook for chiropractic students, and founder of Sigma Phi Chi, the world's first chiropractic sorority
- Forrest C. Shaklee, creator of the first multivitamin in the US, philosopher, and entrepreneur
- Joshua N. Haldeman, prominent chiropractor in Canada and South Africa
