= Mass media in the Quad Cities =

Newspapers, radio, and television in the Quad Cities area of the United States.

== Print ==
Three local daily newspapers serve the Quad Cities, all of them morning editions. The Quad-City Times, based in Davenport, is circulated throughout the Quad Cities metropolitan area, including Davenport, Bettendorf and Scott County in Iowa; and Moline, East Moline, Rock Island and Rock Island County in Illinois. The Dispatch / The Rock Island Argus, published in East Moline, is a daily newspaper based on the Illinois side. While the Times has a primary focus on the Iowa side, and a majority of the coverage in the Argus and Dispatch is on the Illinois side, both newspapers cover the entire Quad Cities.

The daily newspaper serving Henry County, Illinois, is the Star Courier, based in Kewanee.

Weekly newspapers in the Quad Cities include The North Scott Press, based in Eldridge and covering northern Scott County and the North Scott Community School District; the Erie Review (based in Erie in Whiteside County, Illinois, but also including coverage of upper Rock Island County including Port Byron and the Riverdale Community Unit School District 100); and Henry County weeklies including the Cambridge Chronicle, Geneseo Republic and Orion Gazette. The Aledo Times-Record is the weekly newspaper for Mercer County.

The River Cities' Reader is the area's alternative weekly. In addition to in-depth stories and editorials covering government and culture in the Quad Cities, issues of the Reader contain listings of arts and entertainment events taking place throughout the area, and provides critical reviews for regional art exhibitions, music concerts, and theatrical performances.

== Radio ==
Start dates are for the frequency/station license, not for callsign or programming that may have moved from license to license.

=== FM ===
Freq	Call	City	Owner	Start	ERP (W)	Branding	Format	RDS	HD
88.1	WAXR	Geneseo	American Family Association	2001	3,000	88.1 WAXR	Religious	Yes	No
88.5	KALA	Davenport	St. Ambrose University	1967	10,000	88.5 KALA	College radio	Yes	2
89.3	WDLM-FM	East Moline	Moody Bible Institute	1980	100,000	89.3 WDLM	Religious	Yes	No
90.3	WVIK	Rock Island	Augustana College	1963	31,000	90.3 WVIK	Public Radio, News/talk	Yes	2
90.7	WVKC	Galesburg	Knox College	1961	1,000	Tri States Radio	College radio	No	2
91.1	KNSB	Bettendorf	University of Northern Iowa	2010	740	91.1 KNSB	Public Radio	Yes	Yes
91.7	KSUI	Iowa City	University of Iowa	1948	100,000	91.7 KSUI	Classical	Yes	2
92.5	WGVV-LP	Rock Island	Quad Cities Community Broadcasting Group	2004	66	Groove 92.5	Urban Contemporary	Yes	Yes
93.1	KMCS	Muscatine	Krieger Media Company	1996	4,400	MC93	Adult Hits	Yes	No
93.5	KJOC	Bettendorf	Townsquare Media	1984	6,000	I-Rock 93.5	Active rock	No	No
93.9	KQCJ	Cambridge	Virden Broadcasting Corporation	2003	4,200	Planet 93.9 FM	Alternative Rock	Yes	No
94.5	K233AA	Davenport	University of Northern Iowa	1980	170	^{[t]}90.9 KUNI	News/Talk, Adult Alternative	Yes	No
94.7	KMCN	Clinton	Gendreau Broadcast LLC	1970	3,000	Mac 94.7	Adult Hits	Yes	No
96.1	KMXG	Clinton	iHeartMedia	1947	100,000	Mix 96	Adult Contemporary	Yes^{[a&t]}	No
96.9	WXLP	Moline	Townsquare Media	1970	50,000	97X	Classic rock	Yes^{[a&t]}	No
98.3	W252EM	Davenport	Augustana College	2023	250	^{[t]}WVIK-HD2	Classical	No	No
98.9	WLKU	Rock Island	Educational Media Foundation	1947	39,000	K-Love	Christian AC	Yes^{[a&t]}	No
99.7	KBEA-FM	Muscatine	Townsquare Media	1949	100,000	B100	Contemporary hit radio	Yes^{[a&t]}	No
101.3	KUUL	East Moline	iHeartMedia	1976	50,000	101.3 KISS FM	Contemporary hit radio	Yes^{[a&t]}	No
102.1	K271AF	Eldridge	University of Northern Iowa	1999	250	^{[t]}90.9 KUNI	News/Talk, Adult Alternative	Yes	No
102.3	WRMJ	Aledo	WRMJ LLC	1979	3,000	Today's Country - Your All Time Favorites	Country	No	No
102.5	WJRE	Kewanee	Virden Broadcasting Corporation	1966	6,000	Hog Country 102.5	Country	No	4
103.1	KTJT-LP	Davenport	Davenport Educational Association	2005	100	?	Religious	No	No
103.7	WLLR-FM	Davenport	iHeartMedia	1948	100,000	103.7 WLLR	Country	Yes^{[a&t]}	3
104.5	K283BV	Davenport	iHeartMedia	2015	250	^{[t]}Alt 104.5	Alternative Rock	Yes^{[a&t]}	No
104.9	KIIK-FM	DeWitt	Townsquare Media	1977	12,000	US 104.9	Country	Yes^{[a&t]}	No
106.1	K291BP	Bettendorf	St. Ambrose University	?	250	^{[t]}88.5 KALA	College, Variety	No	No
106.5	KCQQ	Davenport	iHeartMedia	1966	100,000	Big 106.5	Classic Hits	Yes^{[a&t]}	No
107.1	K296GZ	Davenport	Grace Community Church of Amarillo	2022	250	^{[t]}Radio By Grace^{[W]}	Religious	No	No
107.7	WQUD	Erie	JMRW, LLC	2015	6,000	Vintage Radio	Oldies, classic country	Yes	No
107.9	KRQC-LP	Davenport	Davenport Adventist Radio	2004	100	Davenport Adventist Radio	Religious	No	No

- ^[a&t] displays artist and title on Radio Data System
- ^[t] FM translator: repeats another station's program
- ^[W] K296GZ is separately owned from WLLR-FM but utilizes WLLR's third HD Radio digital subchannel via a leasing agreement to relay the Radio By Grace network programming to the K296GZ translator

=== AM ===
Freq	Call	City	Owner	Start	Day Power (W)	Night Power	Branding	Format	Stereo	HD
860	KWPC	Muscatine	Krieger Media Company	1947	250	8	AM 860 KWPC	Classic Country	No	No
960	WDLM	East Moline	Moody Bible Institute	1960	520	20	WDLM	Christian Talk	No	No
1230	WFXN	Moline	iHeartMedia	1946	1,000	1,000	Fox Sports 1230	Sports	No	No
1420	WOC	Davenport	iHeartMedia	1922	5,000	5,000	News Talk 1420	News/Talk	No	No

In addition, the Quad Cities had four AM allocations that are now silent:

- WKBF, which went on the air in 1925 (originally as WHBF) at 1270 AM and last formatted Mexican/Hispanic music as "La Jefe 1270." The station went off the air in the fall of 2018, and its license was cancelled by the Federal Communications Commission on June 1, 2020.
- An allocation at 1500 AM, assigned to Geneseo, Illinois, which went silent in the late 1990s and held the call letters WGEN. The station had been paired with an FM signal at 104.9, which was later sold to other owners (currently Townsquare Media) and its city of license moved to DeWitt, Iowa.
- An allocation at 1580 AM, which has been silent since 2000 after several years of format and ownership changes. That station was last known as KFQC, a black gospel station. The station originally signed on the air in 1952 as KFMA, and at its height was known as KWNT and formatted country music. Various formats, including urban contemporary and nostalgia/adult standards, would air on the frequency from the early 1980s until going off the air.
- 1170 AM, which was originally KSTT from 1946 to 1984, KKZX from 1984 to 1987, KSTT from 1987 to 1993, KJOC from 1993 to 2014, and KBOB from 2014 until 2025. Most recent owner Townsquare Media took the station silent in February 2025 and had the Federal Communications Commission cancel the station's broadcast license in July 2025.

== Television ==
Virt. Ch.	Call	City	Owner	Operator	Start	Digital Ch.	DTV	Nickname	Programming
4.1	WHBF	Rock Island	Nexstar Media Group	Nexstar Media Group	1950	4	1080i	Local 4	CBS
4.2	WHBF	Rock Island	Nexstar Media Group	Nexstar Media Group	1950	4	480i	Court TV 4.2	Court TV
4.3	WHBF	Rock Island	Nexstar Media Group	Nexstar Media Group	1950	4	480i	Grit 4.3	Grit
4.4	WHBF	Rock Island	Nexstar Media Group	Nexstar Media Group	1950	4	480i	Escape 4.4	Court TV Mystery
6.1	KWQC	Davenport	Gray Television	Gray Television	1949	17	1080i	TV 6	NBC
6.2	KWQC	Davenport	Gray Television	Gray Television	1949	17	480i	Ion 6.2	Ion Television
6.3	KWQC	Davenport	Gray Television	Gray Television	1949	17	480i	Cozi 6.3	Cozi TV
6.4	KWQC	Davenport	Gray Television	Gray Television	1949	17	480i	H&I 6.4	Heroes & Icons
6.5	KWQC	Davenport	Gray Television	Gray Television	1949	17	480i	Start TV 6.5	Start TV
6.6	KWQC	Davenport	Gray Television	Gray Television	1949	17	720p	Circle TV 6.6	Circle TV
8.1	WQAD	Moline	Tegna	Tegna	1963	31	720p	News 8	ABC
8.2	WQAD	Moline	Tegna	Tegna	1963	31	480i	Antenna TV 8-2	Antenna TV
8.3	WQAD	Moline	Tegna	Tegna	1963	31	720p	MyTV 8-3	MyNetworkTV
8.4	WQAD	Moline	Tegna	Tegna	1963	31	480i	True Crime 8-4	True Crime Network
8.5	WQAD	Moline	Tegna	Tegna	1963	31	480i	Twist 8-5	Twist
8.6	WQAD	Moline	Tegna	Tegna	1963	31	480i	Quest 8-6	Quest
8.7	WQAD	Moline	Tegna	Tegna	1963	31	480i	Newsy 8-7	Newsy
18.1	KLJB	Davenport	Mission Broadcasting	Nexstar Media Group	1985	30	720p	Fox 18	Fox
18.2	KLJB	Davenport	Mission Broadcasting	Nexstar Media Group	1985	30	480i	Me-TV Quad Cities	Me-TV
18.3	KLJB	Davenport	Mission Broadcasting	Nexstar Media Group	1985	30	480i	Rewind TV Quad Cities	Rewind TV
18.4	KLJB	Davenport	Mission Broadcasting	Nexstar Media Group	1985	30	480i	Bounce Quad Cities	Bounce TV
24.1	WQPT	Moline	Western Illinois University-Quad Cities	Western Illinois University-Quad Cities	1983	23	1080i	WQPT	PBS
24.2	WQPT	Moline	Western Illinois University-Quad Cities	Western Illinois University-Quad Cities	1983	23	1080i	WQPT Worldview	Deutsche Welle
26.1	KGCW	Burlington	Nexstar Media Group	Nexstar Media Group	1988	21	720p	Quad Cities CW	The CW
26.2	KGCW	Burlington	Nexstar Media Group	Nexstar Media Group	1988	21	480i	This TV 26.2	This TV
26.3	KGCW	Burlington	Nexstar Media Group	Nexstar Media Group	1988	21	480i	Laff 26.3	Laff
26.4	KGCW	Burlington	Nexstar Media Group	Nexstar Media Group	1988	21	480i	Local 4	CBS
36.1	KQIN	Davenport	Iowa Public Broadcasting Board	Iowa Public Broadcasting Board	1991	34	1080i	IPBS HD	PBS
36.2	KQIN	Davenport	Iowa Public Broadcasting Board	Iowa Public Broadcasting Board	1991	34	480i	IPBS Kids	PBS Kids
36.3	KQIN	Davenport	Iowa Public Broadcasting Board	Iowa Public Broadcasting Board	1991	34	480i	IPBS World	World
36.4	KQIN	Davenport	Iowa Public Broadcasting Board	Iowa Public Broadcasting Board	1991	34	480i	IPBS Create	Create
53.1	WMWC	Galesburg	Trinity Broadcasting Network	Trinity Broadcasting Network	2012	8	480i	TBN 53	Trinity Broadcasting Network
53.2	WMWC	Galesburg	Trinity Broadcasting Network	Trinity Broadcasting Network	2012	8	480i	TCC 53.2	Hillsong Channel
53.3	WMWC	Galesburg	Trinity Broadcasting Network	Trinity Broadcasting Network	2012	8	480i	JUCE 53.3	JUCE TV/Smile
53.4	WMWC	Galesburg	Trinity Broadcasting Network	Trinity Broadcasting Network	2012	8	480i	Enlace 53.4	Enlace
53.5	WMWC	Galesburg	Trinity Broadcasting Network	Trinity Broadcasting Network	2012	8	480i	Salsa 53.5	TBN Salsa
