= WLLR =

WLLR may refer to:

- WLLR-FM, a radio station (103.7 FM) licensed to Davenport, Iowa, United States
- KUUL, a radio station (101.3 FM) licensed to East Moline, Illinois, United States, which held the call signs WLLR or WLLR-FM from January 1983 to March 1998
- WFXN (AM), a radio station (1230 AM) licensed to Moline, Illinois, United States, which held the call sign WLLR from January 1990 to March 2003
- Welshpool and Llanfair Light Railway, narrow-gauge steam railway in Wales, UK.
- West Lancashire Light Railway, a short narrow gauge railway, UK
