= WHBF =

WHBF refers to the following:

- Where Historic Black Hawk Fought, a reference to Chief Black Hawk whose tribe occupied the land that is now Rock Island, Illinois, United States, and the namesake for the WHBF broadcasting stations in Rock Island
  - WKBF (AM), a defunct radio station (1270 kHz) licensed to Rock Island, Illinois, United States, which held the call sign WHBF from 1925 to 1987
  - WLKU, an FM radio station (98.9 MHz) licensed to Rock Island, Illinois, United States, which held the call sign WHBF-FM from 1947 to 1987
  - WHBF-TV, a television station (channel 4 digital/virtual) licensed to Rock Island, Illinois, United States
