= KWNT =

KWNT refers to the following:

- KCQQ, a radio station (106.5 FM) licensed to Davenport, Iowa, United States, which held the KWNT-FM callsign from 1966 to 1973
- KFQC, a defunct radio station (1580 AM) licensed to Davenport, Iowa, United States, which held the KWNT callsign from 1960 to 1982
