= WLKU =

K-Love radio station in Rock Island, Illinois

- Rock Island, Illinois; United States
- Broadcast area: Quad Cities
- Frequency: 98.9 MHz
- Branding: K-LOVE

Programming
- Format: Christian contemporary
- Affiliations: K-Love

Ownership
- Owner: Educational Media Foundation
- Sister stations: KAIP

History
- First air date: October 1947 (as WHBF-FM)
- Former call signs: WHBF-FM (1947–1987); WPXR-FM (1987–1995); WHTS (1995–2006)

Technical information
- Licensing authority: FCC
- Facility ID: 8590
- Class: B
- ERP: 36,000 watts
- HAAT: 265 meters (869 ft)
- Transmitter coordinates: 41°18′44.5″N 90°22′46.2″W

Links
- Public license information: Public file; LMS
- Webcast: Listen live
- Website: Official website

WLKU is a radio station licensed to Rock Island, Illinois, with a Christian contemporary format. The station's frequency is 98.9 MHz, and broadcasts at an effective radiated power of 39,000 watts, from a transmitter located near Orion, Illinois. WLKU is owned by the Educational Media Foundation and is affiliated with the K-Love network.

== History of 98.9 MHz ==
=== Early history ===
The Rock Island allocation of 98.9 MHz represents many milestones in Quad Cities' radio broadcasting. First, it was the first FM station to originate in the area, signing on as WHBF-FM on October 28, 1947. It was owned by the Rock Island Argus.

Second, WHBF-FM became the area's first radio station to broadcast in stereo, implementing the technology in 1958. Stereo multiplexing followed in 1961, with automation coming a few years later.

WHBF-FM's first home was the Harms Hotel, where it broadcast alongside sister station WHBF. As with most FM stations of the era, WHBF either duplicated the AM station's programming or used a classical music/easy listening format. WHBF-TV joined the fold in July 1950, with all three facilities housed in the Telco Building in downtown Rock Island. All three stations were owned by the Potter family of Rock Island, the same family that published the Rock Island Argus.

In the early 1970s, WHBF-FM moved away from its classical/easy listening format, and for a short while, shared WHBF's middle-of-the-road (MOR) format. When WHBF began its country music format in 1974, WHBF-FM continued its MOR format for another decade.

Formats of WLKU
| Name (call signs) | Format |
|---|---|
| 98.9 WHBF-FM | Easy listening (1947 – early 1970s) |
| WHBF AM & FM | Middle of the road (early 1970s – 1974) |
| 98.9 WHBF-FM | Middle of the road (1974–1987) |
| Power 98.9 (WPXR) | Contemporary hit radio, later urban adult contemporary and alternative (1987–1995) |
| All Hit 98.9 (WHTS) | Top 40/CHR (1995–2006) |
| K-LOVE (WLKU) | Christian contemporary (2006–present) |

=== Top 40-era (1987–2006) ===
By 1987, with tastes in radio listenership changing, WHBF-FM adopted a new contemporary hit radio format, in an attempt to draw a younger audience. The new station – now dubbed WPXR and known as "Power 98.9" - premiered on March 17, and was an immediate success. The station quickly drew listeners away from the Quad Cities' market's established top 40 station, KIIK 104, and soon became the area's #1 top 40 station. Often, "Power 98.9" duked it out with country station WLLR-FM for supremacy in the market.

In 1987, David Roth (uncle to David Lee Roth of Van Halen) bought the FM/AM, and in the mid-1990s, WPXR shifted to "The New Sound", featuring urban contemporary and alternative rock music. Listeners did not like "The New Sound", and on June 30, 1995, the station reverted to the Top 40/CHR format, this time with the slogan "All Hit 98.9". The callsign WHTS became effective on July 28. For several years, WHTS carried "The Bob & Tom Show" during its morning programming block until the show moved to KUUL in 2001, to make way for a local morning show.

=== Sale of station to EMF (2006–present) ===
Clear Channel Communications (now iHeartMedia) operated "All Hit 98.9" under a joint sales agreement (JSA) with the station's owner, Mercury Broadcasting Company, for several years. Clear Channel already owned six stations in the Quad Cities market: WLLR-FM, KUUL-FM, KMXG-FM, KCQQ-FM, WOC, and WFXN. Because purchasing additional stations would have placed Clear Channel over Federal Communications Commission ownership limits for the market, a JSA was used instead. (Clear Channel used to operate Mercury Broadcasting's other station in the market, WKBF, in this manner).

The FCC instituted new ownership rules in 2004. Under the new rules, a joint sales agreement is considered equivalent to station ownership, placing Clear Channel over the market limit. The JSA between Clear Channel and Mercury was due to be renewed in 2006, but both companies knew a renewal was not possible. In December 2005, it was announced that Mercury would be selling the station to the Educational Media Foundation for $3.5 million. EMF also announced its intentions to convert the 98.9 frequency to non-commercial status.

The FCC approved the sale on January 24, and the final day for the top 40 format was February 3. The last song ever to be played on "All Hit 98.9" was "American Pie" by Don McLean, which was followed by a tribute medley produced by "Red Hot" Brian Scott. The final section of a song to ever be played on "All Hit 98.9" was "It's So Hard to Say Goodbye to Yesterday" by Boyz II Men. The 98.9 frequency went silent at midnight on February 3, returning to the air with the satellite K-LOVE format the following evening. Five days later, the station adopted its current call letters, WLKU.

The deal officially separated 98.9 FM from WKBF after nearly 60 years of co-ownership. (WHBF-TV was separated from its radio sisters in 1987, around the same time the "Power 98.9" format began.) Mercury Broadcasting, which had purchased the AM/FM duopoly from Rock Island Broadcasting in a separate deal from WHBF-TV (which itself was sold separately to Citadel Communications), retained ownership of WKBF until divesting that station to Quad Cities Media in October 2006. WKBF was later sold to La Jefa Latino Broadcasting in June 2008 (also becoming a full-time Spanish=language station in the process) but by fall 2018, that station abruptly signed off the air permanently; WKBF's broadcasting license was subsequently cancelled on June 1, 2020.
