= Spike O'Dell =

Former radio host in Chicago (born 1953)

William "Spike" O'Dell (born May 21, 1953), a native of East Moline, Illinois, is an American former radio host for WGN Radio in Chicago, Illinois. He joined WGN in 1987 and hosted the afternoon show until 2000 when he took over for Bob Collins in the morning slot from 5 to 9 a.m, following the death of Collins. During the time O'Dell held that slot, his show was consistently the top rated morning show in the Chicago market. O'Dell's tenure with WGN concluded on December 12, 2008, with his final broadcast from the Metropolis Performing Arts Centre in Arlington Heights, Illinois. The broadcast was part of WGN’s Hometown Voices Tour,’ which featured all of the station’s shows and was created at KMOX in St. Louis by Tom Langmyer, who was WGN’s general manager at the time.

== Early life ==
Spike O'Dell was born the son of East Moline Police Chief Merle and Dot O’Dell, along with siblings John and Jeni. He graduated from United Township High School in 1971, and then spent two years at York College in Nebraska in 1971–1973. O'Dell worked summers on a garbage truck and was a security guard at International Harvester in Rock Island, Illinois when he took a part-time job at WEMO-FM radio.

== Radio career ==
Odell's first radio hosting position was at WEMO-FM in East Moline at the age of 25. While working at the factory, he disc jockeyed on weekends there as well as doing some fill-in slots. In 1977 Spike took another part-time job with WQUA radio in Moline Illinois. Following this, he obtained a full-time morning position at KSTT-AM, where he affectionately was referred to as “Spike at the Mic”. This proved to be a significant position, as it allowed O'Dell to move, in 1981, to a Major Market Morning Radio spot at WBT-AM in Charlotte, NC. After a brief stint as "morning guy," he returned to KIIK-FM (“KiiK 104”). In 1987, Billboard Magazine awarded Spike “Top 40 Air Personality of the Year” in a Medium Market.

The Billboard magazine award led to a call from then program director Dan Fabian to interview at WGN-AM in Chicago. In 1987, O'Dell was hired as the afternoon drive host for the station. Spike would go on to work 21 years at WGN. He remained at the top of the ratings in all the dayparts he hosted while at the station. O'Dell moved around a few times during his tenure at WGN, with notable stints in the afternoon, and ultimately, in the morning drive slot. The move to mornings occurred after the death of then host Bob Collins. In 2008, O'Dell made the decision to retire "on a high note," during a successful time of his career, to move to Nashville and be closer to his children, Michael and Caroline. His last was on December 12, 2008, and was broadcast at the Metropolis Performing Arts Centre in Arlington Heights, Illinois, in front of a live studio audience filled with his listeners.

According to a 2013 interview, O'Dell now enjoys spending time with his five grandchildren, golfing, photography, watercolor and acrylic painting, and sleeping late.

During the course of his career, he worked at:

- 1976–1977 WEMO-FM East Moline
- 1977–1978 WQUA Moline, IL
- 1978–1980 KSTT-AM Davenport, IA
- 1980–1982 WBT-AM Charlotte, NC
- 1982–1987 KIIK-FM Davenport, IA
- 1987 WGN-AM Chicago, IL Spike was hired as afternoon host 3-7pm and moved to mornings on February 9, 2000 after Bob Collins was killed in a tragic plane crash.
- 2008 Final Broadcast of “The Spike O’Dell Show” at the Metropolis Theatre on December 12.

== Radio show ==
- Otis Fanortner from Anchorage, Alaska
- Three guys fresh out of college touring America in their Chevy Van would call in from various spots across country as a spin-off of “See the USA in Your Chevrolet”.
- Donald Koch from “Koch's Shell” in Cairo, IL for a gas price report.
- “Ruthie”, the elderly gossip columnist from the small town of Buda Illinois.
- Renamed River Drive that was next to the KSTT studios and across the street from the “Hostess Foods Bakery” to “Twinkie Blvd.”
- Coined the phrase that would become a staple term at WGN-AM “The 50,000 Watt Love Pump”
- Created a segment with his Sports Reporter, David Kaplan, called “Theme Sports”.
- Claimed he could do an hour on any topic someone could throw at him. He went on to do 1 hour on pencils and mustard.
- Made Famous, his signature giveaway prize, “The Goose Island Spike O’Dell Hat”, which showed up Presidents, Astronauts, Late night comedians, both the north and south poles, etc.
- Also known for frequently including in his broadcasts the phrase, “You aint gettin this kind of radio up and down the dial”.
- A segment called “Now You Know” that required listeners to remember a crazy bit of trivia for prizes
- Started the “Spike O’Dell Coffee Cup Museum” (a collection of paper coffee cups signed by people interviewed on his show) first located in Beloit, Wisconsin, and now in Door County, Wisconsin.

== Charitable contributions ==
He created Bite Your Butt Mustard (BYB) and a full line of condiment products which went on to make over $1 million for the Tribune's main charity “The Neediest Kids Fund” He then published a cookbook that included recipes using the “Bite Your Butt” products with proceeds going to “The Neediest Kids Fund” and has sold personal artwork and Christmas ornaments yearly that also benefited “The Neediest Kids Fund”. Since retirement he has produced numerous watercolor paintings that have been sold to benefit the Living Water Project, A Nashville Based charity that drills clean water wells around the world.

== Recognitions and awards ==
- 1998 Billboard Magazine “Top 40 Air Personality of the Year in Medium Market”
- 1999 A.I.R (Achievement in Radio) Awards recipient “Best Afternoon Show”
- 2000 Inducted into his high schools “Hall of Fame” (UTHS)
- 2001 Chicagoland A.I.R. Awards winner for “Best Morning Show”
- 2003 Planetary Studies Foundation Received the Astronaut James A. Lovell “Failure is not an Option” annual award
- 2014 Inducted into the WGN Radio Walk of Fame on Friday, June 27 in Pioneer Court along with 9 other legendary broadcasters to commemorate WGN Radio's 90-year history.
