= KQCJ =

Coordinates: 41°22′56″N 90°10′47″W

- Cambridge, Illinois; United States
- Broadcast area: Quad Cities
- Frequency: 93.9 MHz
- Branding: Planet 93.9

Programming
- Format: Alternative rock

Ownership
- Owner: Fletcher M. Ford; (Virden Broadcasting Corp.)
- Sister stations: WJRE, WKEI

History
- First air date: 2003 (as WYEC)
- Former call signs: WYEC (2003–2016)
- Call sign meaning: K Quad Cities Jack (previous format)

Technical information
- Licensing authority: FCC
- Facility ID: 70277
- Class: A
- ERP: 4,200 watts
- HAAT: 120 meters (390 ft)
- Transmitter coordinates: 41° 22' 56" N, 90° 10' 47" W

Links
- Public license information: Public file; LMS
- Webcast: Listen Live
- Website: planet939.com

KQCJ (93.9 FM) is a commercial radio station, licensed to Cambridge, Illinois and serving the Quad Cities radio market. Known as "Planet 93.9" the station airs an alternative rock radio format. It is operated by Fletcher M. Ford, of Regional Media, a Virden Broadcasting Corporation. KQCJ's studios and offices are located in Davenport.

KQCJ has an effective radiated power (ERP) of 4,200 watts. The transmitter is located in Munson Township, Illinois, off North 1600th Avenue.

== History ==
=== WKEI-FM, WJRE, WYEC ===
The station began in May 1966 as WKEI-FM, licensed to of Kewanee, Illinois, broadcasting at 92.1 MHz. It was co-owned with WKEI 1450 AM. At first, the simulcast the same programming. They were owned by J.F. McNaughton. The call sign later changed to WJRE in 1974, and the frequency moved to 93.9 in October 1996.

In 2007, the station received authorization to change its city of license to Cambridge, and to move its transmitter site to provide a rimshot signal to the Quad Cities radio market. WYEC had initially been an easy listening station (Your Easy Choice). Over time, the format switched to oldies and classic hits, with a playlist spanning the mid-1960s through 1980s. WYEC was also the radio affiliate for the now-defunct Quad City Flames American Hockey League (AHL) team from October 2007 to April 2009. The station's major competition was KUUL (101.3 FM), whose playlist at the time focused on the 1960s and 1970s.

Upon KUUL's switch to a Top 40 format in February 2012, WYEC – then called "The New Oldies" – responded by adding a program devoted to music of the 1950s and 1960s on Fridays. The station's branding was also changed to "Rewind 93.9." In addition to local programming, KYEC carried the syndicated Tom Kent Radio Network. Sports programming included Illinois State University athletics and Rock Island High School/Western Big 6 Conference sporting events, eventually switching to Bettendorf High School athletics.

Competing oldies station KJOC (1170 AM) switched to all sports in May 2014. The flip left WYEC as the market's only full-time oldies station, although another local station, adult contemporary-formatted KMXG, featured weekend programming devoted to music of the 1970s through 1990s. Then in January 2016, WQUD-FM signed on the air. However, unlike WQUD's format of 1950s and 1960s pop music and country music from the 1990s and earlier, WYEC continued to devote itself to pop, rock and soul music of the 1960s, 1970s and 1980s.

=== Jack FM as KQCJ (2016–2020) ===
On August 30, 2016, WYEC announced plans to drop its oldies format and move to adult hits under the "Jack FM" brand. It switched call letters KQCJ on September 1.

The initial playlist was set to be a mix of rock, country and pop and spanning the late 1960s through the late 2000s. Even though most Jack FM stations have no disc jockeys, an on-air staff of six was hired for KQCJ.

=== Planet 93.9 ===
On April 22, 2020, KQCJ flipped to a wide-ranging alternative rock format, branded as "Planet 93.9." The flip brings the "Planet" branding back to the market for the first time since 2000, when it aired on KORB (93.5 FM). In addition, the station reunited Dave Levora and Darren Pitra, previously on WXLP (Levora was also a DJ at KORB) and KBOB, to host mornings. The flip leaves KMCN as the sole adult hits station for the market, with KQCJ now primarily competing against WLLR-HD2/K283BV and KJOC (the former KORB), and to a lesser extent, KCQQ.
