= Palmer Communications =

American media company

- Company type: Private
- Industry: Radio stations, Television stations
- Predecessors: Banker's Life, Central Broadcasting Company
- Founded: 1922
- Founder: B.J. Palmer
- Fate: The stations were sold off to various companies and are now presently owned by Nexstar, iHeartMedia, and Gray.
- Successors: Nexstar Media Group, iHeartMedia, (Note: Jacor Communications owned WHO (AM) from 1997 until 1998 when they merged with Clear Channel Communications, now iHeartMedia. Clear Channel also bought WOC AM and WLLR-FM from Vickie Anne Palmer, who had owned both since 1986, in 2000.) Gray Television
- Headquarters: Des Moines, Iowa
- Area served: Iowa, Illinois, Florida, and Oklahoma
- Services: Broadcasting

Palmer Communications was a radio and television company started by B.J. Palmer, then owner of the Palmer College of Chiropractic in Davenport, Iowa, around 1929. They were formed after buying WOC (AM) from Robert K. Karlowa's Karlowa Radio Corporation in 1922, starting an ownership connection that lasted nearly 75 years. In 1929, Central Broadcasting Company was formed with B.J. Palmer as chairman. This company would buy out WHO (AM) in Des Moines from Banker's Life (now Principal Financial Group) in 1930.

With both WOC and WHO under common ownership, the stations would be combined into one and operate under the dual-identity of WHO-WOC after the activation of a 50,000 watt tower near Mitchellville, Iowa, and deactivation of the separate towers in 1932. In later years, they would buy out KICK (not to be confused with the later KIIK-FM, which was used at 103.7 while owned by Palmer, and now at 104.9 under Townsquare Media) from Carter Lake, Iowa, and move it to Davenport, where it became WOC-FM and now programs country music as WLLR-FM, start WOC-TV (known as KWQC since 1986 and located adjacent to the Palmer campus) and WHO-TV, and buy out KFOR-TV in Oklahoma City, Oklahoma, in 1989, their first and only property outside the state of Iowa and their sole property in Oklahoma.

== History ==
=== Early history: 1922-1932 ===
Palmer Communications got their start when B.J. Palmer bought WOC from Robert K. Karlowa's Karlowa Radio Corporation in 1922. The Federal Radio Commission's General Order 40 reallocated frequencies in 1928, and WOC was reassigned to share time on 1000 kilohertz with the Banker's Life (now Principal Financial Group) station in Des Moines, Iowa, WHO. In 1930, the stations were known as WHO-WOC, and in 1932, the separate transmitters would be deactivated with the introduction of a 50,000 watt transmitter near Mitchellville, Iowa, after which both stations were consolidated and the old WOC frequency shut down.

=== The Ronald Reagan years: 1932-1937 ===
Palmer Communications most famous employee would be future U.S. President Ronald Reagan who worked as a sportscaster, starting in 1932, relaying Chicago Cubs baseball games over the air with WHO-WOC. He worked with the stations until 1937 when he was offered a contract with Warner Bros and made the move into acting. In 1980, he would defeat incumbent president Jimmy Carter and serve until 1989. In 1988, he returned to WOC after they dedicated their new studios on East Kimberly Road to him.

Also, in 1934, Palmer bought out KICK and moved it to Davenport, Iowa, where it was rechristened as WOC. During this time, it could be heard on 1370 AM.

=== 1941-1948 ===
WOC was briefly moved to 1450 AM in 1941 before being moved to a "regional" frequency at 1420 AM in 1942, where it can still be heard today. In 1948, an FM sister station known as WOC-FM signed on the air. It has since moved through three formats, including its current country music format that is the highest rated of any format in the Quad Cities.

=== Television and later years: 1949-2000 ===
Palmer Communications entered the television business as Palmer Broadcasting with the creation of WOC-TV in 1949. They would own the station until it was sold to 4th generation Palmer Vickie Anne Palmer in 1986 along with WOC AM and FM, after which it was rechristened as KWQC. In 1995, they would be acquired by Young Broadcasting. In 2013, Media General acquired the station from Young after its bankruptcy. In 2016, Nexstar announced it was acquiring Media General, and on January 17, 2017, the deal was completed. Since Nexstar had already owned WHBF, they ended up selling KWQC to Gray Television. Had Nexstar chose to divest WHBF and keep KWQC, it would have represented a reunion with WHO and KFOR for the first time since they were all three owned by Palmer Communications.

In 1954, WHO-DT was signed on by the Tri-City Broadcasting Company, which was also owned by the Palmer family.

At some point in the 1980s, they became interested in cellular communications and the name of the company was changed to Palmer Communications to reflect this.

In 1989, they bought out KTVY (now KFOR-TV), for $50 million on February 27, 1989. their sole property outside of Iowa and in the state of Oklahoma.

In 1996, the Palmer's sold off WHO and KFOR to the New York Times. WHO and KFOR would later be sold to Oak Hill Capital Partners, who formed Local TV LLC to manage them. In 2007, they entered into an agreement with Tribune Media before they bought the stations outright in 2013. In 2018, Nexstar announced its intent to purchase out Tribune for $6.4 billion in cash and debt. In 2019, the sale was completed, with Nexstar retaining ownership of WHO (after selling the WOI-DT/KCWI duopoly in Des Moines) and KFOR.

In 1996, Palmer bought WMT (AM) in Waterloo, Iowa, from an ownership group including former Iowa governor Robert D. Ray and sportscaster Forrest "Frosty" Mitchell. Ownership of this station lasted for only a year.

In 1997, WHO AM and FM and WMT AM would be bought out by Jacor Communications, who a year later, would merge with Clear Channel. They would change their name to iHeartMedia in 2013.

Vickie Anne Palmer controlled WOC AM and FM until they were bought out by Clear Channel in 2000, ending Palmer family ownership of the stations.

On October 10, 2000, the company was dissolved.

As of 2022, all former Palmer radio and TV stations are now owned by iHeartMedia and Nexstar, except for KWQC, now owned by Gray Media. (Note: When Nexstar acquired Media General, they had to choose whether to keep KWQC or WHBF. They chose to keep the latter, spinning KWQC to Gray Television, the only former Palmer TV station to not be owned by them.)
