= WKBF =

WKBF may refer to:

- WKBF (AM), a defunct AM radio station in Rock Island, Illinois
- WKBF-TV, a defunct Independent television station in Cleveland, Ohio
- WPRO (AM), an extant radio station in Providence, Rhode Island, which held the call sign WKBF from 1924 to 1925
