= WOC Broadcast Centre =

- WOC Broadcasting Center
- U.S. National Register of Historic Places
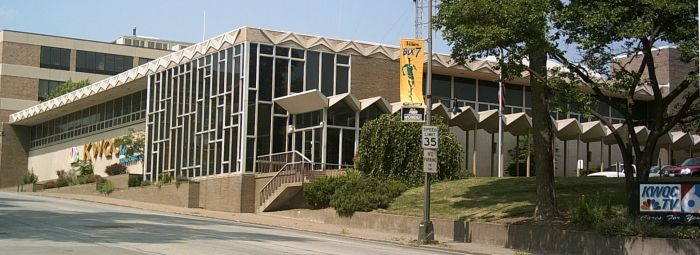
- KWQC (WOC) Broadcasting Center in 2006

- Location within Iowa Location within the United States
- Location: 805 N Brady St. Davenport, Iowa
- Coordinates: 41°31′43″N 90°34′25.6″W
- Area: less than one acre
- Built: 1963
- Architectural style: Modern Movement
- NRHP reference No.: 100006171
- Added to NRHP: February 17, 2021

The KWQC Television Broadcasting Centre (also known as KWQC Broadcast Center, previously WOC Broadcast Centre) is a television studio and historic building located just north of Downtown Davenport, Iowa, United States. Robert Karlowa, a music store owner in Rock Island, Illinois, began experimenting with radio transmission in 1907. He had a Morse code broadcasting station before taking up voice broadcasting. His radiophone station was granted call letters 9-BY and in 1922 he was granted the call letters WOC. B. J. Palmer, the president of Palmer School of Chiropractic, bought the station in March of that year and moved Karlowa's equipment to Davenport. He then bought new Western Electric equipment and dedicated his new station on the Pamer campus on October 8, 1922. WOC became one of the original members of the NBC Radio Network in 1926. WOC was an AM broadcasting station, its FM station signed on the air in October 1948. Palmer applied for a television license in 1947, and WOC-TV went on the air on October 31, 1949. All three stations shared the same premises. It was Iowa's first commercial television station. The Ed Ryan home across the street from the Palmer campus was acquired, remodeled and expanded for a broadcast studio. In 1963, the present building replaced the Ryan house on the same property. They spent more than $2 million on its construction and equipment. After Palmer Communications sold the radio stations in 1986, they moved to a new building on Davenport's eastern border with Bettendorf. WOC Broadcast Centre now houses KWQC-TV, the call letters WOC-TV changed to after the sale. It was listed on the National Register of Historic Places in 2021 as WOC Broadcasting Center, using the American English spelling.
