= WQUD =

Erie, Illinois; United States
- Broadcast area: Quad Cities
- Frequency: 107.7 MHz
- Branding: Vintage Radio

Programming
- Format: Oldies, Classic country

Ownership
- Owner: JMRW LLC

History
- First air date: 2015 (at 105.5)
- Former frequencies: 105.5 MHz (2015–2018)

Technical information
- Licensing authority: FCC
- Facility ID: 60359
- Class: A
- ERP: 6,000 watts
- HAAT: 97 meters (318 ft)
- Transmitter coordinates: 41°28′47.0″N 90°16′08.0″W

Links
- Public license information: Public file; LMS
- Webcast: Listen Live
- Website: wqudfm.com

WQUD (107.7 FM) is a radio station licensed to Erie, Illinois, whose format is a hybrid of oldies and classic country.

The station is located at 910 Albany Road, Erie, and has a broadcast area covering eastern Iowa (including the Quad Cities) and northwestern Illinois.

The station was granted its license in August 2015, and went on the air shortly thereafter playing automated music with no live on-air talent or commercials. The station finally went "live" on January 7, 2016, with general manager Aaron Dail the first on-air disc jockey. The station was expected to have an initial playlist of more than 2,000 songs. More on-air talent and affiliation with Fox News Radio were expected in the coming weeks.

WQUD's main competitor was, until September 2016, WYEC, an oldies station based in Kewanee, Illinois with studios in Bettendorf, Iowa, but with the latter station's format switch to adult hits, WQUD would become the Quad City market's only station programming pre-1970 pop music on a regular basis. (Another station in the Quad Cities market, KMXG, has programming blocks of music from past decades on the weekends (1980s and 1990s on Saturdays, 1970s on Sundays)). As of October 26, 2017 WQUD had a construction permit to change frequency to 107.7 MHz, which took place on June 25, 2018.
