= KWPC =

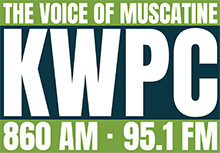
- Muscatine, Iowa; United States
- Frequency: 860 kHz
- Branding: AM 860 FM 95.1 KWPC

Programming
- Format: Classic country
- Affiliations: ABC News Radio, Radio Iowa, Learfield Sports, Brownfield Network

Ownership
- Owner: Krieger Media Company
- Sister stations: KMCS

History
- First air date: January 6, 1947
- Call sign meaning: "Keep Watching Port City"

Technical information
- Licensing authority: FCC
- Facility ID: 47085
- Class: D
- Power: 250 watts day; 8 watts night
- Transmitter coordinates: 41°26′34.1″N 91°4′33.54″W
- Translator: 95.1 K236CF (Muscatine)

Links
- Public license information: Public file; LMS
- Webcast: Listen live
- Website: kwpconline.com

KWPC (860 AM) is a commercial radio station serving the Muscatine, Iowa area. The station broadcasts a classic country format. The station airs regular news, weather and sports coverage. KWPC is owned by Krieger Media Company.

The studio, transmitter, and broadcast tower are located at 3218 Mulberry Avenue in northwest Muscatine, behind Muscatine High School. The tower is 108 m (354 ft) tall. KWPC shares its tower with sister FM station KMCS.

== History ==
Charles Henderson was the original owner of the land that was to become Muscatine's KWPC Radio. During the 1940s this portion of Mulberry Avenue was a gravel road extension and considered to be located just outside the city. The property was a working farm with grazing livestock. “Charlie” Henderson also owned an automobile dealership in Muscatine. In 1946 Henderson gave his daughter Thelma and her new husband George J. Volger the land and financial backing to start the radio station. Cattle continued to roam the land around the station's tower well into the 1970s and KWPC still occupies the original farmhouse today.

Both George and Thelma were Muscatine natives. George, born in 1914, was the son of a local jeweler. Following graduation from the University of Iowa, he traveled with Roy Rogers and the “Sons of the Pioneers” as a Public Relations agent. He began his career in “broadcast” with what was known early on as the “Red and Blue” Television Network. Eventually, the “Red” Network became the National Broadcasting Company (NBC) and the “Blue” Network became the “American Broadcasting Company (ABC). Over the years Roy Rogers frequently visited Volger at the radio station.

The planning for a new AM radio station in Muscatine began during the mid-1940s. Radio signals broadcast in the AM (Amplitude Modulation) band can travel hundreds, or even thousands, of miles. Part of the duties of the Federal Communications Commission (FCC) includes protecting the “signal coverage” of each station to ensure that no other broadcast station interferes in the station's licensed coverage area. By the mid-1940s many AM licenses had already been issued and it was difficult to find a frequency for Muscatine that would not cause interference. The solution was found by sharing a common frequency with a station licensed in Toronto, Ontario, Canada which was licensed to operate using high-power (50,000 watts) from sunset to sunrise. The terminology used is "clear-channel station." In 1946, through a special treaty coordinated between the licensing authorities of the United States and Canada, the frequency 860 kHz was assigned to Muscatine with the restrictions of a maximum power of 250 watts and operation only between the hours of sunrise to sunset. Although KWPC did eventually receive permission to broadcast 24 hours a day (a provision added for national security reasons), the transmitter power output is not permitted to exceed 7 watts after sunset, and that is why the signal strength changes so noticeably at night.

The radio station's first broadcast day was January 6, 1947. Lee de Forest, the inventor of the “triode vacuum tube” and considered by many to be the “Father of American Radio,” was keynote speaker at the event. The hand-written pages of his speech are on file at Muscatine's Musser Museum. The following day Sterneman's Clothing became the first official advertiser. KWPC was the first to broadcast Muscatine City Council Meetings and in the fall of 1947 became the first to broadcast from the West Liberty Fair. Mr. Volger thought it was important to use community members when building the staff. This included engineers, sales staff and all on-air positions. Important early programs on KWPC included:

- Marian Templeman: hosted “Problems and Solutions,” and “Swap Shop”
- William D. Randall produced the “Little Known Stories of Muscatine” series (Still available in book form today)
- Thelma Volger enjoyed leading the Children's Programming ... and “Happy Hour” aired on Saturday mornings
- Anna Opel provided philosophical “Gardening Programs”
- Don Wooten did both the news and sports, along with hosting a music program called “Don’s Den”
- Bob “Spike” Woody also did sports
- Joe Roth Jr. hosted Muscatine's first phone-in talk show. Afflicted with polio, Joe hosted the show “Live” from his home on Broadway Street. A dedicated telephone line connected the home to the radio station.

The most common way of preserving radio broadcasts during radio's golden age was through the use of 16-inch transcription discs (also called “Electrical Transcriptions” or, “ETs”). They were of various types and sizes, but the most commonly found today are 16” diameter. They are usually aluminum-based coated with cellulose nitrate lacquer, a thick black compound similar to that used in automotive paint from the 1920s through the 1950s. They were used to create instantaneous recordings, records which could be played directly after being recorded. A large record cutting machine (essentially a phonograph with a heavy and precisely regulated turntable) was used to cut a groove into the coating to create an audio recording of the program. ETs were usually recorded at 33 1/3 RPM, although some were recorded at 78 RPM as well. (The original discs containing KWPC's 1947 sign-on ceremony were donated to the Musser Museum by John and Darlene Schwandke.)

Another, and more portable recording device of the era, was the wire recorder which used steel piano wire on a stainless steel spool. The wire recorder was the very first reliable audio recorder to find its way into the American home in significant numbers. The popular “Webster 80-1” model sold for $150 in 1947. That would equate to $1,250 in year 2005 money. Magnetic tape recorders did not become available until the mid-1950s.

George Volger wanted to add a second radio station using new technology known as FM, or frequency modulation. KWPC-FM went on the air in 1949. Additional space was added to the back of the old farm house for the transmitter and the FM antenna bays were mounted at the top of the existing broadcast tower behind the building. Like most FM stations of the 1950s and 1960s KWPC-FM played “easy listening” music. To provide independent identity for the “FM” station the call letters were eventually changed to KFMH during the 1970s. The slogan at the time was... “FM is our middle name!” George Volger was a highly respected member of the broadcast community and served several terms on the board of directors of the National Association of Broadcasters (NAB) which represents broadcasters on a national scale.

In 1982 John Flambo purchased the Muscatine radio stations from Volger. John was the son of well known Quad-City personality G. Laverne Flambo, who had been the executive director of Mid American Media which owned two Quad City radio stations. John had been General Manager of Davenport's KRVR radio prior to purchasing KWPC-KFMH. Under his ten-year ownership, and with the help of station manager Steve Bridges (Captain Steve), the programming and talk show content of both radio stations gained national notoriety. KFMH programmed alternative rock music, which had gained widespread popularity on the west coast at the time. “The Pirate FM,” as it became known, soon gained a devoted, fiercely loyal audience, as the station played lesser-known artists in a variety of genres... rock, jazz, blues and folk. KFMH disc jockeys included Borderline Bob, Sean Tracy, Dirty Judy, John Obvious and Captain Steve. The station was known for “pushing the envelope” which became apparent following a broadcast in August 1991 that resulted in the station being fined for airing jokes the Federal Communications Commission deemed indecent. KWPC also drew attention with its controversial morning talk show. In 1991 Flambo Broadcasting constructed a new and much taller tower in rural Wilton on which to relocate the KFMH antennas and increase the range of its signal.

In September 1992, Steve Bridges, who by then had become vice-president and minority owner of the two stations, contacted John Schwandke, who was managing the Washington, Iowa radio stations at the time. The question was... “Would you be interested in purchasing Muscatine’s KWPC-AM radio station?” It was proposed that Flambo would sell KWPC, along with its buildings and property, while they retained ownership of KFMH and relocated those studios to Davenport. Schwandke, who is a Muscatine native and began his radio career under the tutelage of George Volger and Vincent Beckey, purchased the radio station where he had worked from 1970 through 1982.

John and Darlene Schwandke began operating KWPC on January 1, 1993 with renewed emphasis on local news and information. Many of the philosophies applied to their “code of ethics” about station operation were extensions of what Volger and Beckey had implemented. Expanding the news department became a priority and included the addition of a state-of-the-art “mobile studio” which made it possible to provide instant remote broadcasting, even while driving, from anywhere within KWPC's coverage area. The husband and wife team worked in partnership on a daily basis with John being responsible for sales, and programming and Darlene in charge of office management and accounting. Tim Scott Lissy handled the engineering. He had been employed with the station previously with Steve Bridges. Muscatine Communications Inc. was considered a “family business” with son Warren active in advertising sales and the voice of John's mother being used on KWPC's daily sign-on and sign-off tapes. “There was even a feeling of family among our young co-workers.” said Darlene, “Some of them called us Mom and Dad too. They are our radio family and we are proud of them!”

Also during 1993, KFMH moved its studios to Davenport where it continued its alternative format for another year. It signed off on March 1, 1994 at 3:00 pm while playing “I've Seen All Good People: Your Move” by the rock group “Yes.” It was the same song they had signed the alternative format on with in June 1973. The night KFMH signed off about 500 people showed up outside the station to protest, but the door was locked. Later that same month the 99.7 MHz frequency was sold to New York-based Connoisseur Communications and the call-letters were changed to KBOB-FM. It was sold again in 2000 to Cumulus Media and became KBEA-FM ("B 100"). In 2013, current owner Townsquare Media purchased KBEA. Even though the operation studios are located in the Quad Cities, the frequency of 99.7 MHz remains licensed as a Muscatine radio station. In March 2013, Steve Bridges launched 99 Plus KFMH as an internet station and picked up where it left off, playing rock, blues, and jazz. The original deejays returned, as well.

The Schwandkes set out to explore the possibility of finding a new FM frequency that could be assigned to Muscatine. With the help of consulting engineers they were successful and in June 1996 brought 93.1 MHz - KWCC to the airwaves. KWCC is believed to be the first completely digital broadcasting facility to be built between Chicago and Denver, which was quite an achievement for a small town radio station. Every source of pre-recorded audio destined for transmission over the airwaves was in “digital format” and sourced from computer hard drives. Even the FM transmitter had digital capability... ready, in advance, for the day the FCC would finally mandate that mode of radio transmission (radio's version of HDTV). In 2005, that station's call letters were changed to the current KMCS.

John and Darlene Schwandke were proud to have had the opportunity to give KWPC its 50th Anniversary Celebration. They invited George Volger Jr. to be the guest of honor and he shared stories about growing up at the station. Live bands played throughout the day from stages set up in the antenna field. Several visitors from far away brought historical memorabilia about KWPC that has since been donated to the Musser Museum. It was a grand ceremony as Muscatine's oldest and newest operating radio stations celebrated together.

In the fall of 1999, the Schwandke's received an unsolicited offer to sell the two radio stations. After much consideration they agreed. W.P.W Broadcasting of Monmouth, Illinois, who already owned 15 radio stations along the Mississippi valley between Quincy and Dubuque, became the new owners of KWPC and KWCC on December 1, 1999.

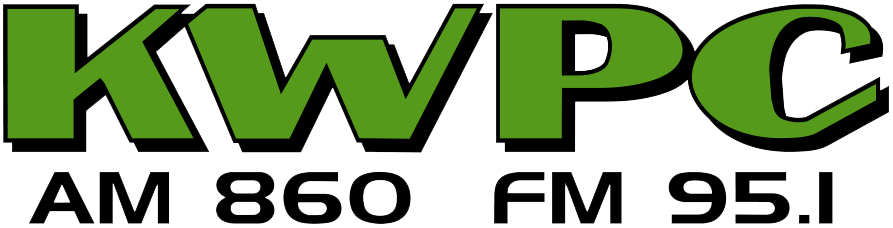
Previous logo

On October 22, 2014, KWPC replaced the soft oldies portion of its format with classic country and added an FM signal via translator K236CF 95.1 FM Muscatine.

Effective October 3, 2018, WPW Broadcasting sold KWPC, the K236CF translator, and sister station KMCS to Jam Media Solutions, LLC for $965,000.

In November 2024, amid the bankruptcy of then-owner JAM Media Solutions, an agreement was reached to sell KWPC and sister station KMCS to Krieger Media Company for $250,000.

== Translator ==
Call sign	Frequency	City of license	FID	ERP (W)	Class	Transmitter coordinates	FCC info
K236CF	95.1 FM	Muscatine, Iowa	146170	250	D	41°26′34.1″N 91°4′33.5″W	LMS
