= KWQC-TV =

Television station in Davenport, Iowa

- Davenport–Bettendorf, Iowa; Moline–Rock Island, Illinois; United States
- City: Davenport, Iowa
- Channels: Digital: 17 (UHF); Virtual: 6
- Branding: KWQC-TV 6

Programming
- Affiliations: 6.1: NBC; for others, see § Subchannels

Ownership
- Owner: Gray Media; (Gray Television Licensee, LLC)

History
- First air date: October 31, 1949
- Former call signs: WOC-TV (1949–1986)
- Former channel numbers: Analog: 5 (VHF, 1949–1953), 6 (VHF, 1953–2009); Digital: 56 (UHF, 2003–2009), 36 (UHF, 2009–2020)
- Former affiliations: ABC (secondary, early 1960s–1963)
- Call sign meaning: Contains QC for the Quad Cities, similar to former WOC-TV call sign

Technical information
- Licensing authority: FCC
- Facility ID: 6885
- ERP: 1,000 kW
- HAAT: 375.1 m (1,231 ft)
- Transmitter coordinates: 41°32′48.8″N 90°28′37.8″W

Links
- Public license information: Public file; LMS
- Website: www.kwqc.com

KWQC-TV (channel 6) is a television station licensed to Davenport, Iowa, United States, serving the Quad Cities area as an affiliate of NBC. Owned by Gray Media, the station maintains studios on Brady Street in downtown Davenport, and its transmitter is located in Bettendorf, Iowa.

The station began broadcasting as WOC-TV on October 31, 1949. A sister venture to WOC radio, WOC-TV was the first television station in the state of Iowa and in the Quad Cities and was an NBC affiliate from its debut, heavy on local programming in its initial years. In 1963, the WOC Broadcast Centre—now KWQC-TV's studio facility—opened in downtown Davenport; the modernist structure is listed on the National Register of Historic Places. By the 1970s, WOC-TV was established as the news ratings leader in the Quad Cities, a title it has held for most of its history.

The Palmer family, which established WOC broadcasting and the nearby Palmer College of Chiropractic, began restructuring its broadcast holdings in the 1980s. WOC radio was sold to another family member in 1986, at which time WOC-TV became KWQC-TV. Three years later, Palmer opted to take advantage of a favorable tax situation to sell KWQC-TV and buy a larger-market TV station. KWQC was owned by Broad Street Television Corporation from 1989 to 1995, Young Broadcasting from 1995 to 2013, and Media General from 2013 to 2017 until being sold to Gray in 2017.

== History ==
=== Construction and early years ===
On March 12, 1948, the Central Broadcasting Company applied to the Federal Communications Commission (FCC) for permission to build a new television station on channel 5 in Davenport, Iowa, which it was granted on June 2. Central, a company owned by the chiropractor B. J. Palmer, also owned radio station WOC in Davenport and WHO in Des Moines. In preparation for the establishment of a television station, Palmer purchased the former Ryan residence, which was located across the street from Palmer's chiropractic school on Brady Street. To provide network programming, Palmer proposed the establishment of a series of microwave relays carrying the network signal between Chicago and Davenport, to serve a WHO television station at Des Moines and one owned by fellow NBC affiliate WOW at Omaha, Nebraska. Later that year, the FCC imposed a freeze on new TV station grants to sort out possible changes to television broadcast standards. By the time of the freeze, Iowa proper had only been assigned two stations: the new WOC-TV for Davenport and WOI-TV at Iowa State College in Ames. Also assigned in the Quad Cities area was WHBF-TV to go on the air from Rock Island, Illinois.

WOC-TV, Davenport, Ia.: This lusty youngster has received a hearty reception in its first five months on the air, thanks to a constructive programming operation. Instead of relying on kinescoped network shows (it's a noninterconnected station), it's been going about the task of originating and producing strictly local stanzas that are drawing an enviable mail pull.

— Variety, on WOC-TV in May 1950

Construction on the WOC-TV transmitter at Bettendorf, Iowa, was completed by September 1949, and on September 27, the station sent out its first test patterns, which were received as far away as Des Moines and Peoria, Illinois. Regular programming debuted on October 31, 1949, making WOC-TV the first television station in Iowa. WOC-TV operated at the outset for three hours a night and was off the air on Saturdays. The station was an NBC affiliate, in keeping with WOC radio. Originally, there was no direct link for network programs, which were kinescoped—recorded off a monitor onto film—and then shipped to Davenport for air. Local programming originated from studios built in a purpose-built annex to the Ryan house. With no direct network connection, the station produced a wide range of local shows to fill its airtime, ranging from quiz shows to audience programs as well as telecasts of high school sports and even women's wrestling. Remote broadcasting, however, relied on bulky equipment and was soon dropped. Series with titles such as Musical Moods, Pay or Play, and Pages of Melody co-existed with WOC-TV's network presentations. WOC-TV also offered local children's programming, beginning with Ken Wagner's Comic Cutups, which went to air less than two weeks after the station's first broadcast; in 1956, Ken became "Cap'n Ken", the first in a line of four such hosts at WOC-TV including Cap'n Vern, Cap'n Don, and Cap'n Ernie (Ernie Mims) that lasted until 1974. The sculptor Isabel Bloom hosted a program that used clay figures to illustrate fairy tales. All commercials were produced live as well.

WHBF-TV began on channel 4 on July 1, 1950, bringing to the area programming from the other networks—CBS, ABC, and DuMont. On September 30, both stations began receiving live network programming. WOC-TV went from broadcasting 28 hours a week to 65 1/2 hours a week by the end of 1950 with the advent of live network coverage. Within 13 months, WOC-TV was profitable and surpassed WOC radio in gross advertising billings. The station also used programming from the Paramount Television Network, which delivered all its programs by kinescope instead of live.

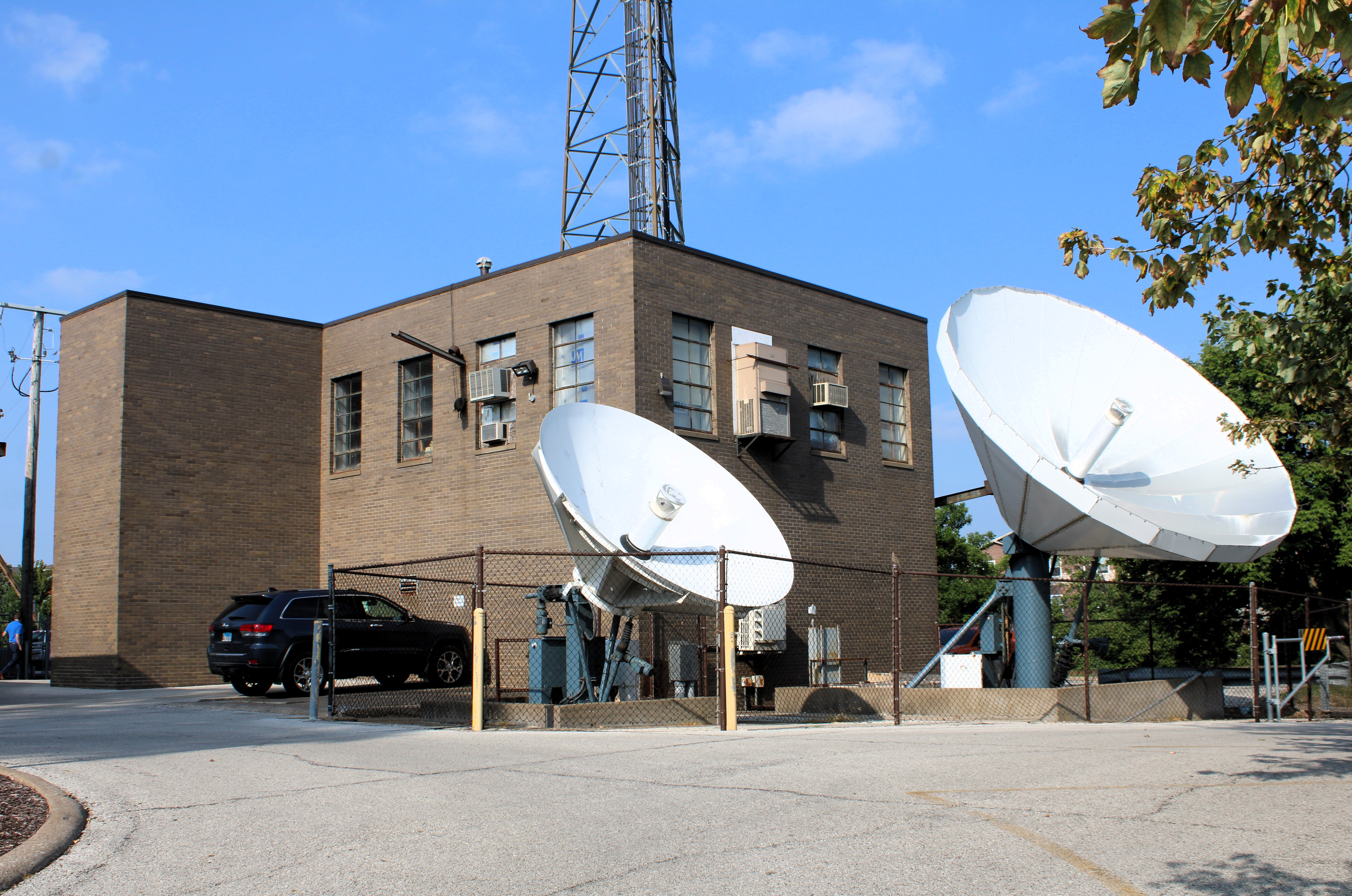
The 1949 annex to the Ryan house, which remained after Broadcast Centre was opened in 1963

In April 1952, the FCC lifted the freeze after three and a half years with major changes to television allocations, including the addition of ultra high frequency (UHF) channels to the existing 12 in the very high frequency (VHF) band and new station spacing requirements. In doing so, it made a total of 30 changes to the channels of existing stations, including WOC-TV, which would be moved from channel 5 to channel 6. The actual channel change came 20 months later, on November 30, 1953, when power was raised from 25,000 watts to the maximum 100,000 watts.

B. J. Palmer died on May 27, 1961. Later that year, WOC-TV erected a 979-foot (298 m) tower at Bettendorf, 377 feet (115 m) taller than the original mast. The area gained a third station in 1963, when WQAD-TV (channel 8) began at Moline, Illinois, as an ABC affiliate; WOC-TV had aired some ABC programming in the years leading up to channel 8's establishment.

=== Construction of Broadcast Centre ===
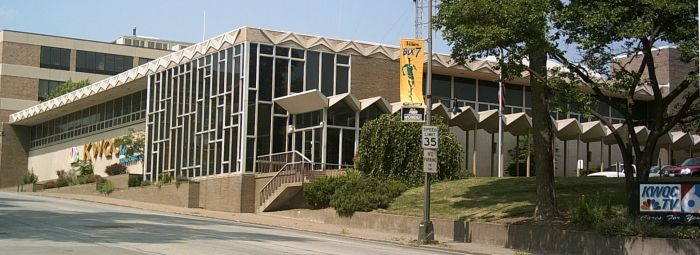
The WOC Broadcast Centre opened in 1963 and is still in use as KWQC-TV's studios to this day; it is also listed on the National Register of Historic Places as the WOC Broadcasting Center.

In early 1962, WOC purchased a nearby apartment building and demolished it to make way for a new studio facility at 809 Brady Street, north of the existing studios at 805 Brady. Ground was broken that June, and WOC Broadcast Centre opened in 1963. The building, designed by Stewart-Robison-Laffan of Davenport and built by the Priester Construction Company, contained 68,000 square metres (730,000 ft^{2}) of space. For television, it featured two studios, the largest of which contained an 18-foot (5.5 m) turntable and could hold an audience of 200. It also contained full studios for WOC radio and a radio and television newsroom. Draperies in the building were inspired by those David Palmer had seen at a New York City hotel. The Ryan house was demolished, but the 1949 annex was incorporated into the new structure. Though the studio had some color facilities, local color programming did not begin until 1967, when the station purchased color cameras. Broadcast Centre (as the WOC Broadcasting Center) was listed on the National Register of Historic Places in 2021.

=== Later Palmer years ===
In 1977, David Palmer died, spurring the transfer of Palmer Broadcasting—with the WOC stations and KIIK FM radio in Davenport, the WHO stations in Des Moines, and radio stations in Naples, Florida—to a consortium including the company's president, two Washington lawyers, a Davenport bank, and trusts for David Palmer's daughters. Palmer Broadcasting became Palmer Communications by 1980. In 1982, the previous mast at Bettendorf was replaced by a 1,383-foot (422 m) tower shared by WOC-TV and WHBF-TV to increase their coverage areas. In addition to improving reception in and around the Quad Cities, a goal was to improve coverage to the west, an area also served by stations in the Cedar Rapids market, where viewers in Cedar, Johnson, and Washington counties in Iowa were dependent on a translator for reception of WOC-TV.

One of David Palmer's daughters, Vickie Miller, and her husband Doug agreed to buy WOC and KIIK radio from Palmer Communications in 1986 under the banner of Signal Hill Communications. As part of the negotiations, it was decided that WOC-TV would change its call sign. Because of its location west of the Mississippi River, any new call sign would be a four-letter assignment beginning with K. Station management selected KWQC-TV, containing QC for Quad Cities, which was adopted on December 6, 1986. After the sale, WOC and KIIK radio remained in the Broadcast Centre until relocating to new studios in late 1987.

=== Broad Street and Young ownership ===
Even though WOC and KIIK radio had been sold, Vickie Miller retained ownership interests in Palmer Communications. This meant that even though the stations had been sold, the FCC considered them a monopoly for tax purposes. The commission at the time offered tax deferments if part of the monopoly was sold off and reinvested in another media entity, allowing Palmer to put off considerable capital gains taxes. It was also unclear how long Vickie Miller would continue to own Signal Hill Communications. Palmer Communications decided to take advantage of these circumstances to essentially trade KWQC-TV for another station in a larger market. In February 1989, Palmer bought KTVY in Oklahoma City, and two weeks later, KWQC-TV was put up for sale. The station was acquired by Broad Street Television Corporation of New Haven, Connecticut, a return to broadcast ownership for Richard Geismar and Fred Walker, who had previously sold a firm to Clear Channel Communications in 1984. The new owners conducted studies on moving the station's studio to the transmitter site in Bettendorf, citing a lack of parking and outdated facilities at the Broadcast Centre.

After Prudential, an equity partner in Broad Street, wished to sell, the firm sold KWQC-TV to Young Broadcasting for $55 million in a deal announced in 1995. By this time, plans to move the studio to Bettendorf had been abandoned.

=== Media General and Gray ownership ===
In 2013, Media General acquired Young Broadcasting. Two years later, Media General initially agreed to merge with the Des Moines–based Meredith Corporation before receiving and accepting a higher offer from Nexstar Broadcasting Group in 2016. Nexstar owned WHBF-TV and, under FCC rules of the time, could not own two of the four highest-rated stations in the same media market. It opted to keep WHBF-TV and sell KWQC-TV and WBAY-TV in Green Bay, Wisconsin, to Gray Television for $270 million in a sale completed on January 17, 2017.

== News operation ==
Local news was on WOC-TV's schedule from the moment it began broadcasting. A 10-minute newscast was among the station's first planned local programs. The station had by the 1970s established itself as the Quad Cities news ratings leader, with audience shares in the metro area exceeding 50 percent and slightly less for the full area of dominant influence. Several factors boosted WOC-TV's news standing, including the larger proportion of Iowa news on channel 6 compared to the other two stations in Illinois, even though stations competed for viewers on both sides of the river. In the early 1980s, WHBF-TV made a credible ratings effort against WOC-TV, including a narrow lead at 6 p.m. in several ratings surveys. However, WOC rebounded quickly thanks to changes in the news staff and the debut of a 5 p.m. news magazine program, 5 P.M. Live, which launched in 1984 as a replacement for the canceled national newscast franchise Newscope and the local version of the syndicated PM Magazine. The close ratings race turned back into a large lead for WOC, which went from second to first place by 13 to 15 percentage points of the audience. The popular syndicated game show Wheel of Fortune also was credited with raising channel 6's evening news ratings.

The station debuted a morning newscast at 6:30 a.m. in October 1989. Quad Cities Today progressively expanded with earlier starts: to an hour in 1992, 90 minutes in 1997, and two hours in 2002. For its first 16 years on the air, Quad Cities Today was anchored by Charles King, who retired in 2005. The first weekend morning edition of Quad Cities Today debuted in 1992 and was canceled in January 2008 as part of cost-cutting at Young Broadcasting; KWQC restored weekend morning news in 2014.

In 1993, 5 P.M. Live evolved into Paula Sands Live, named for its host Paula Sands, and expanded to an hour. After being trialed at an earlier afternoon hour in 1994, when KWQC debuted a more traditional newscast at 5 p.m., it returned to the 4:30 p.m. slot in 1995 as a half-hour program, later moving to 3 p.m. as an hour. Sands retired in 2023, and the program was retained under the new title Quad Cities Live.

From December 31, 2012, to December 30, 2015, KWQC-TV produced the 9 p.m. newscast for Davenport Fox affiliate KLJB (channel 18). The relationship ended after Nexstar acquired WHBF-TV and began providing services to KLJB from that station; it had been known for months that production of the KLJB newscast would be assumed by WHBF-TV.

== Notable former on-air staff ==
- Rick Benjamin – anchor, 1988–1992
- Kari Lake – intern, 1992
- Russ Rhea – anchor/reporter, 1988–1990

== Technical information and subchannels ==
KWQC-TV's transmitter is located in Bettendorf, Iowa. The station's signal is multiplexed:

Subchannels of KWQC-TV
Subchannel	Res.	Short name	Programming
6.1	1080i	KWQC-TV	NBC
6.2	480i	ION	Ion
6.3	480i	COZI TV	Cozi TV
6.4	480i	H&I	Heroes & Icons
6.5	480i	StartTV	Start TV
6.6	480i	Outlaw	Outlaw
6.7	480i	ION+	Ion Plus

KWQC-TV began airing a digital signal on January 15, 2003, on UHF channel 56. It ceased analog broadcasts on June 12, 2009, the official digital television transition date, and began digital broadcasting on UHF channel 36, using virtual channel 6. KWQC-TV relocated its signal from channel 36 to channel 17 on November 6, 2019, as a result of the 2016 United States wireless spectrum auction. The signal was required to remain at low power until January 17, 2020, to avoid interference to another station repacking from channel 17.
