= WKBF (AM) =

Radio station in Rock Island, Illinois (1925–2018)

- Rock Island, Illinois; United States
- Broadcast area: Quad Cities
- Frequency: 1270 kHz

Ownership
- Owner: La Jefa Latino Broadcasting
- Operator: Quad City Radio Group

History
- First air date: February 1925
- Last air date: Autumn 2018
- Former call signs: WHBF (1925–1987); WKBF (1987–2020)
- Former frequencies: 1350 kHz (1925–1928); 1210 kHz (1928–1939); 1240 kHz (1939–1941)
- Call sign meaning: Derived from WHBF

Technical information
- Facility ID: 8593
- Class: B
- Power: 5,000 watts
- Transmitter coordinates: 41°29′40.1″N 90°28′0.5″W

WKBF was a radio station licensed to Rock Island, Illinois, which last carried a regional Mexican format. The station's frequency was 1270 kHz, and was broadcast at a power of 5 kW. It last broadcast in Autumn 2018, and its license was cancelled on June 1, 2020. Its transmitter was located on 22nd Avenue (Old Colona Road) in Moline, alongside the Moline–East Moline border just off 53rd Street and Avenue of the Cities.

== Station history ==
=== Early history ===
The history of the station dates to 1925, when businessman Calvin Beardsley purchased an experimental radio transmitter that operated in Cambridge, Illinois. He took the equipment and set it up at the rear of his store in Rock Island.

The station was first licensed on February 20, 1925, with the call sign WHBF, and broadcasting with 100 watts at 1350 kHz. The call letters were randomly assigned from a sequential roster of available call signs, however, they were said to stand for "Where Historic Blackhawk Fought"—a reference to Black Hawk, a Native American chief whose tribe lived in an area roughly corresponding to what became the Quad Cities.

Following the establishment of the Federal Radio Commission (FRC), stations were initially issued a series of temporary authorizations starting on May 3, 1927. In addition, they were informed that if they wanted to continue operating, they needed to file a formal license application by January 15, 1928, as the first step in determining whether they met the new "public interest, convenience, or necessity" standard. On May 25, 1928, the FRC issued General Order 32, which notified 164 stations, including WHBF, that "From an examination of your application for future license it does not find that public interest, convenience, or necessity would be served by granting it." However, the station successfully convinced the commission that it should remain licensed.

On November 11, 1928, the FRC implemented a major reallocation of station transmitting frequencies, as part of a reorganization resulting from its implementation of General Order 40. WHBF was assigned to 1210 kHz.

The station moved to the Harms Hotel in Rock Island in 1932. In November of that year, Beardsley sold interest in his station to the John Potter family, which operated the Rock Island Argus. In 1939, the station changed frequency to 1240 kHz, and increased power to 1,000 watts, 24 hours a day, with a directional array at night. In 1940, the station's power was increased to 5,000, with a directional array, day and night, and in 1941, with the implementation of the North American Regional Broadcasting Agreement, WHBF changed frequency to 1270 kHz, where it remained for the balance of its existence.

WHBF was joined by a sister FM radio station - WHBF-FM, the first in the Quad Cities - in October 1947, and a television station went on the air in July 1950. By now, all three facilities were located in the Telco Building in downtown Rock Island.

WHBF underwent many format changes since the end of the Golden Age of Radio. During the 1960s and early 1970s the station aired a middle-of-the-road, adult standards format.

=== 1974-1995: 'Country Sunshine' era ===
The station's signature format for many years was country music; from 1974 to 1995, the station was known as "Country Sunshine Radio", and aired both current and classic country music.

WHBF first adopted the country format in 1974, and for years was among the top-rated stations in the Quad Cities market, alongside powerhouses KSTT and KIIK.

But by the mid-1980s, amid the explosive growth of FM radio, WHBF's listenership began to wane. WLLR-FM, which began broadcasting its country format at the Quad-Cities market's 101.3 MHz in 1983, began to erode WHBF's listenership, and by the end of the 1980s, WLLR was the overall top-rated overall station in the market. Meanwhile, 1270 kHz - which changed its callsign to WKBF in March 1987 - would never regain its former popularity.

WKBF's country format struggled through the early 1990s, getting most of its programming from the Satellite Music Network's "Real Country" satellite service. In 1994, management was in negotiations with Steve Bridges of KFMH to move its progressive music format and its staff to 1270 after that station was sold, but nothing ever came of it. By 1995, with WKBF at the bottom of the ratings for several years, station managers finally decided to lay the country station to rest.

=== Format shuffle ===
For a year, WKBF simulcasted WHTS-FM's Top 40 format. In September 1996, the station flipped to an adult standards/MOR format, although virtually all of its programming was from ABC Radio Networks. However, this format's listenership remained minimal.

On February 12, 2004, the Quad City Radio Group - which by now was operating the station - flipped WKBF to classic country. WKBF played country favorites from the 1970s through 1990s, but the station's format failed to entice listeners.

WKBF's next format - a liberal talk format - debuted on the frequency in March 2005. The station's primary programming came from Air America Radio, with hosts including Al Franken, Stephanie Miller and Mark Riley. Despite all the format changes, one carryover program remained: "Croonerville", a Sunday morning program of adult standards hosted by local personality Charlie Honold; the program premiered on WKBF in 1996 and ran for 10 years. The switch to progressive talk provided a modest boost to WKBF's ratings, reaching a 2.6 share in the fall 2005 Arbitron ratings report for the Quad Cities market.

=== 2006-2007: Christian talk era ===
Prior to 2006, WKBF, and sister station WHTS, were owned by Mercury Broadcasting and operated by a joint sales agreement with Clear Channel Communications.

In October 2006, it was announced the station would be acquired by Quad Cities Media, for a purchase price of $150,000 and would go Christian talk by the end of the year. On December 5, the station switched to an all-Christmas format, the prelude to a Christian-oriented station. Known as "Truth 1270", the primary focus was on Christian preaching and teaching; sacred music was provided by AbidingRadio at night and early morning.

During the "Truth 1270" era, WKBF became the Quad City market's first radio station to go digital, with the CAM-D technology.

=== 2007-2018: Regional Mexican era ===
On June 22, 2007, after airing a 100-year-old recording of Ira Sankey singing "God Be With You Till We Meet Again", WKBF flipped to "La Pantera", a regional Mexican format, thus becoming the first full-time Spanish radio station in the Quad Cities. While most of the broadcast day featured regional Mexican music, in the mornings, from 6 a.m. to 7 a.m., WKBF broadcast Spanish religious programming like Gracias a Vosotros and Enfoque a la Familia.

During 2007, WKBF broadcast high school and Iowa State University sports broadcasts, and Quad Cities River Bandits baseball games in the English language, alongside its Spanish-language programming; the sports programming has since moved to other stations in the market.

From March through June 2008, WKBF dropped Regional Mexican for all-Christian Spanish programming from the Bible Broadcasting Network's Spanish network Red de Radiodifusión Bíblica.

In June 2008, WKBF was sold to La Jefa Latino Broadcasting, for a purchase price of $680,000. La Jefa continued the Regional Mexican format, under the "La Jefa" brand as opposed to the "La Pantera" brand. By January 2010, WKBF was the 2nd-most-listened-to AM station in the entire Quad Cities market with a 1.9 share.

In early 2013, WKBF – which had been broadcasting on an FM translator at 105.7 MHz in the Quad Cities, applied to the Federal Communications Commission to move the transmitter from Davenport to Moline and upgrade its power from 10 watts to 250 watts.

=== End of operations ===
In the fall of 2018, the 105.7 FM translator frequency (along with 1270 AM) went silent; that December, announcement of the sale of the FM translator to Augustana College was made, with plans to relocate the transmitter and use it as the repeater for WVIK's forthcoming HD2 programming. Augustana College and WVIK formally announced plans to launch the new station on both 90.3-HD2 (the station's hybrid digital frequency) and the translator at 105.7 FM beginning October 1, 2019.

Meanwhile, nothing was publicly announced about the status of 1270 AM or its future, or why the frequency has been silent. However, one of the transmitter towers was demolished on January 14, 2020, and the second tower was demolished eight days later. WKBF's license was officially cancelled by the FCC on June 1, 2020.

== History of call letters ==
The call letters WKBF were previously assigned from 1926 until 1935 to an AM station in Indianapolis, Indiana. From 1968 to 1975, the WKBF-TV call sign was used by a now-defunct television station in Cleveland, Ohio.

== Sources ==
- Anderson, Frederick I, editor. "Joined By a River: Quad Cities." Lee Enterprises, 1982. ISBN 0-910847-00-2
- Radio stations make new country connection, The North Scott Press, Eldridge, Iowa, June 22, 2005
- Rock Island Argus editorial "We welcome the Pirate FM to Rock Island" March 4, 1994.
- Arbitron, Inc. Ratings, Fall 2005
