= WKEI =

- Kewanee, Illinois; United States
- Broadcast area: Henry, Bureau, Knox, and Stark Counties
- Frequency: 1450 kHz
- Branding: Newstalk 1450 AM, 107.7 FM - WKEI

Programming
- Format: News/talk
- Affiliations: Fox News

Ownership
- Owner: Fletcher M. Ford; (Virden Broadcasting Corp.)
- Sister stations: WJRE, KQCJ

History
- Call sign meaning: W KEwanee Illinois

Technical information
- Licensing authority: FCC
- Facility ID: 70276
- Class: C
- Power: 500 watts day 1,000 watts night
- Translator: 107.7 W299BN (Sheffield)
- Repeater: 102.5 WJRE-HD4 (Galva)

Links
- Public license information: Public file; LMS
- Webcast: Listen Live
- Website: Regional Daily News

WKEI (1450 AM) is a radio station broadcasting a news/talk format. Licensed to Kewanee, Illinois, United States, the station serves the Quad Cities area. The station is currently owned by Fletcher M. Ford's Virden Broadcasting Corp.

WKEI is now a news/talk radio station, a Fox News affiliate and home to syndicated talk show hosts Joe Pags, Hugh Hewitt and Jim Bohannon.
