= KBZD =

Coordinates: 35.114°N 101.822°W

Amarillo, Texas; United States
- Broadcast area: Amarillo, Texas
- Frequency: 99.7 MHz (HD Radio)
- Branding: Radio By Grace

Programming
- Format: Contemporary Christian (KRBG simulcast)
- Subchannels: HD2: Worship music "Worship 24/7"; HD3: Classic country "Legends 103.9"; HD4: Southern gospel "The Gospel Station"

Ownership
- Owner: Grace Community Church of Amarillo

History
- First air date: 1994 (as KRQA)
- Former call signs: KRQA (1993–1994); KFMA (2/1994-10/1994); KBUD (1994–1995); KLLR (1995–1997)

Technical information
- Licensing authority: FCC
- Facility ID: 33449
- Class: C3
- ERP: 22,000 watts
- HAAT: 96 meters
- Translators: 102.3 K272EM (Amarillo, relays HD2); 103.9 K280EU (Amarillo, relays HD3); 104.7 K284BH (Amarillo, relays HD4)

Links
- Public license information: Public file; LMS
- Webcast: Listen Live; Listen Live (HD2); Listen Live (HD3); Listen Live (HD4)
- Website: radiobygrace.com worship247.com (HD2) legends1039.com (HD3) thegospelstation.com (HD4)

KBZD (99.7 FM) known as "Radio By Grace" is a contemporary Christian formatted radio station in Amarillo, Texas, United States. Its studios are located on Plains Boulevard (in the former Homeland grocery store) in west Amarillo and its transmitter is in unincorporated Randall County.

== History ==
KBZD signed on as soft AC KRQA in 1993 and quickly changed its call letters to KFMA, known on the air as 99.7 KFM in early 1994. In late 1994, the call letters and format changed again, this time to KBUD, an automated rhythmic leaning mainstream CHR that billed itself as "Your Bud 99.7." In May 1995, the call letters and format changed again and it became KLLR "Clear 99.7" another soft AC format. In 1997, the call letters changed one final time to KBZD and the station started broadcasting a blues format. Bilingual Top 40 was next Hot 997 (2003–2004) and later flipped to Tejano as Tejano FM (2004–2005). Next, KBZD became Rhythmic Contemporary 99.7 The Party from 2005 to 2006, followed by 99.7 for the holidays from November 15, 2006, to December 25, 2006, when it became Energy 99–7. In December 2007 to late March 2008.

In late March 2008, KBZD switched to a Tejano format.

In October 2012, KBZD changed formats once again switching from a tejano format to a classic country format

In June 2013, KBZD dropped its classic country format and began stunting with an unusual all-female "Divas" microformat.

On July 26, 2013, KBZD changed their format to hot adult contemporary, branded as "Fun 99.7".

On July 10, 2017, KBZD changed their format from hot adult contemporary to a simulcast of contemporary Christian-formatted KRBG 88.7 FM Umbargar.

In January 2021, KBZD added The Gospel Station to its HD4 subchannel.

On March 29, 2022, KBZD added Worship 24/7 to its HD2 subchannel.
