= The Dispatch / The Rock Island Argus =

Newspaper based in East Moline, Illinois

The Dispatch–Argus

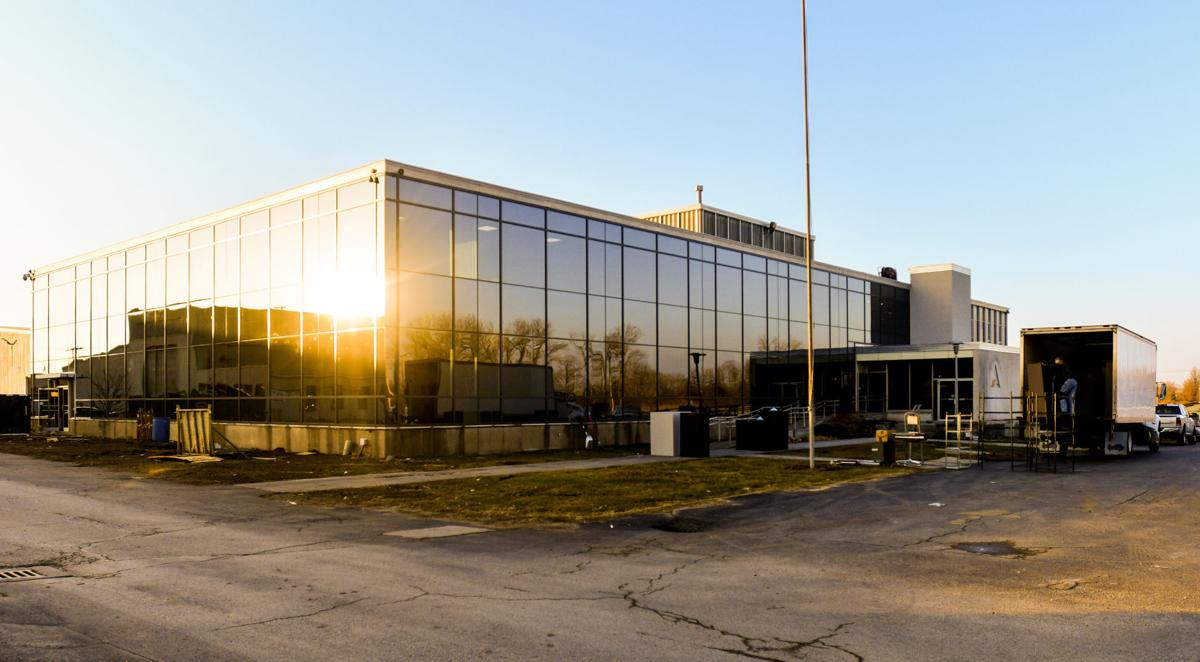
- Former The Dispatch – The Rock Island Argus headquarters, East Moline, Illinois
- Type: Daily newspaper
- Format: Broadsheet
- Owner: Lee Enterprises
- Publisher: Deb Anselm
- Editor: Matt Christensen
- Founded: The Rock Island Argus: 1853; The Dispatch: 1878
- Language: English
- Headquarters: 4600 E 53rd St; Davenport, Iowa 52807; United States
- Circulation: 13,039 Daily; 13,618 Sunday (as of 2023)
- ISSN: 1064-9220
- Website: qconline.com

The Dispatch–Argus is a daily morning newspaper in Davenport, Iowa, and circulated primarily throughout the Illinois side of the Quad Cities — Moline, East Moline, Rock Island and Rock Island County, but also for sale in retail establishments on the Iowa side of the Quad Cities — Davenport and Bettendorf. The Dispatch is circulated in and around Moline while The Rock Island Argus is circulated in and around that city. The two are essentially the same newspaper, only with different front covers. They have a combined circulation of about 25,000.

The newspapers were owned by the Small Newspaper Group, located in Kankakee, Illinois, until 2017, when Davenport-based Lee Enterprises bought the paper and its assets.

== History ==
=== Rock Island Argus ===
The Argus, founded in Rock Island, is one of Illinois' oldest continuously published newspapers. It can trace its origin to 1851 with the founding of a weekly paper called The Republican. It became Rock Island County's first daily two years later after it was purchased by Colonel J.B. Danforth. Because Danforth was a staunch member of the Democratic Party he had the paper's name changed to the Rock Island Argus. The newspaper was purchased by John Potter in 1882 when the paper had 500 subscribers. He died in 1898 and his wife Minnie took over the management of the paper and ran it until her death. In 1925 she had the newspaper plant built on Fourth Avenue in Rock Island. The Potter family operated the newspaper until 1986, when it was bought by the Small Newspaper Group.

In November 1932, the Potters bought Rock Island's first radio station, WHBF, later WKBF. Eventually, that station spawned an FM station (now WLKU) and a television station (still operating under the WHBF-TV calls).

In 1953, the International Typographical Union held a strike. After a seven-month strike, on July 9, bombs went off beneath the cars of two Argus employees, destroying property and slightly injuring an infant. Five union men were eventually charged with the bombings.

The Potters sold the Argus to the Small family in 1986.

Issues for years 1862–1922 have been digitized and are available for free online at both the Chronicling America and the University of Illinois Library websites.

=== Daily Dispatch ===
The first issue of the Moline Daily Evening Dispatch was produced on July 31, 1878. It was started by Oliver and Louise White, who were publishers of The Molly Stark, a weekly newspaper in Toulon, Illinois. Competition forced them to sell the paper to Patterson S. McGlynn and John K. Groom. In the early to mid-20th century the paper was under the leadership of Harry Sward, Lee R. Blackman and August Sundine. Under Sward's leadership the paper's identity changed from one focused on Moline to Western Illinois and it became The Daily Dispatch.

The Daily Dispatch was purchased by Len H. Small on February 28, 1969, and the newspaper then started the conversion from the “hot metal” method of composition to computerized photocomposition. The plant was expanded in 1974 and the first Sunday edition of the paper was published on March 14, 1976.

=== Dispatch–Argus ===
From 1986 onward, Small Newspaper Group gradually cut back the local operations of the Argus and consolidated most of its business and editorial operations with those of The Dispatch. By the 1990s, the two newspapers' content was virtually identical, the only difference being the mastheads.

In 1995 both papers switched from evening to morning publication. Quad-Cities Online has been operated by the papers since 1994. It provides local online news, weather, sports and event information and has grown to include an online auction; QCHomes.com, a service for buying or selling real estate; and opportunities for banner, email and mobile advertising.

Lee Enterprises announced on June 19, 2017, that it had reached an agreement with the Small Newspaper Group to purchase The Dispatch–Argus and its assets. This made the Dispatch and Argus sister publications to Lee's flagship title, the Quad-City Times, which has long been the major newspaper on the Iowa side of the Quad Cities. While the Dispatch-Argus will maintain a separate editorial voice, it will share a publisher with the Times and Muscatine Journal.

=== The Leader ===
From 1986 through 2007, a weekly total market coverage newspaper called The Leader circulated in Scott County, Iowa, location of Davenport. Distributed on Thursdays, the newspaper contained re-printed content from the Dispatch and Argus, plus exclusive features and hard news stories from Davenport and the Iowa side of the Quad Cities.

== Notable people ==
- Dan Stoneking, journalist, later sports editor of the Minneapolis Star and president of the Professional Hockey Writers' Association
