= Russ Rhea =

American journalist (born 1962)

- Born: Russell Allen Rhea; July 31, 1962 (age 63); Phoenix, Arizona, U.S
- Education: Arizona State University
- Occupations: Television and radio broadcaster, public relations
- Spouse: Lynne Henderlong (1962-)

Russell Rhea (born July 31, 1962 in Phoenix, Arizona) is a former television journalist best known for his reporting on Texas National Guard missions in Bosnia and Central America and is currently a public relations executive in Austin, Texas. Rhea grew up in Rancho Palos Verdes, California and is a 1981 graduate of Rolling Hills High School. He graduated from the Walter Cronkite School of Journalism at Arizona State University in 1985 and began his television career at KYEL-TV in Yuma, Arizona. After 3 years as a reporter and host of PM Magazine at KWQC-TV in Davenport, Iowa, Rhea moved to KXAN-TV in Austin, Texas, where he spent 10 years as a morning show host, weathercaster and reporter. In 1987, the Texas National Guard invited Rhea to report on their activities in Bosnia; his reports from Sarajevo won several awards.

Rhea left television in 2000 and joined Hahn, Texas Communications (formerly TateAustinHahn) . In addition to leading media efforts on a number of public issues elections in Texas, Rhea has won numerous public relations industry awards for video production and conducts TateAustinHahn's spokesperson training program.
