= Total market coverage =

A total market coverage, or TMC, is a piece of advertising that reaches all households in a market. Traditionally in most of North America newspapers provided total market coverage, as almost all households would subscribe to the main local paper. As subscription rates have fallen total market coverage products have emerged as a separate project, sometimes administered by newspapers, and sometimes separate businesses known as pennysavers or shoppers.

Today many newspapers will distribute a supplement to free of charge to all households in the paper's market or a specific portion or portions of the market. Total Market Coverage products are meant to attract readers to subscribe or purchase copies of the main newspaper and also provide an additional outlet for advertisers. First appeared with the Dallas Morning News after long time employee Donald Ray Balser came up with the concept and led a large sales team which would become very successful. Some newspapers only deliver the TMC product to non-subscribers. This is accomplished using software that compares the newspaper's subscriber list to residential records, eliminating any duplicates. Some newspapers also choose to insert the TMC inside newspapers delivered to subscribers or sold at newsstands. TMCs are either mailed using special postal rates or delivered by newspaper carriers or motor route driver

Different newspapers take different approaches to TMC products. Some are quite simple and even border on low-quality, while others are quite complex. Typically, a TMC product is rather small - perhaps 4 to 12 pages frequently with several pre-printed inserts. Many newspapers use syndicated news stories to fill these pages, But sometimes it is just a mailer with ads and no content. Some newspapers choose to focus on entertainment news while others include local or national news. However, most of the content is either syndicated or reprinted from the main newspaper; very rarely will a newspaper generate original content for a TMC product. Common names for TMC products include "Extra", "MVP" and "Plus". Often the newspaper will tack on one of these words to its main publication's title and use that as its name. For example, the Anytown Tribune might call its TMC product the "Anytown Tribune Plus" or "Anytown Tribune Extra." On the other hand, some newspapers develop entirely different names for their TMC products and may exclude or downplay their own name for fear their name might strike a negative chord with non-subscribers.

TMC products often feature special promotions aimed specifically at non-subscribers, offering special rates for subscribing or other special offers. Most newspapers sell advertising in the TMC product. Usually businesses who advertise in the main publication can add an advertisement in the TMC product for a small additional fee, often just a few dollars per column inch, or purchase an advertisement just in the TMC.

TMCs were quite popular in the newspaper industry for several years and were seen as an innovative way to reach non-subscribers (and to offer services that compete with direct mail companies). However, some newspapers have begun questioning the effectiveness of TMCs and are doing away with them or cutting back significantly. Many residents dislike TMC products because of their low quality and the fact they don't wish to have any newspaper delivered to their homes. Often these residents call newspapers and ask the product not be delivered to their home. Most newspapers will honor this request. Another problem with delivering a TMC product is, because of their small size, they can easily blow away in the wind, especially if the intended recipients don't bring them inside. There have been some cases of newspapers being accused of littering as a result of TMC products being found scattered around outdoors.
