= KMCS =

Radio station in Muscatine, Iowa

- Muscatine, Iowa; United States
- Frequency: 93.1 MHz
- Branding: MC93

Programming
- Format: Adult hits
- Affiliations: Hawkeye Radio Network

Ownership
- Owner: Krieger Media Company
- Sister stations: KWPC

History
- First air date: June 19, 1996
- Former call signs: KWCC (1996–2005)
- Call sign meaning: "Mac South"

Technical information
- Licensing authority: FCC
- Facility ID: 47086
- Class: A
- ERP: 4,400 watts
- HAAT: 117 meters (384 ft)
- Transmitter coordinates: 41°26′34″N 91°04′33″W

Links
- Public license information: Public file; LMS
- Webcast: Listen live
- Website: voiceofmuscatine.com/mc93

KMCS (93.1 FM, "MC93") is a radio station licensed to Muscatine, Iowa, United States. Owned by Krieger Media Company, it broadcasts an adult hits format serving parts of Iowa and Illinois. The transmitter for KMCS is co-located with KWPC in northwest Muscatine.

== History ==
=== Call sign history ===
The Muscatine allocation for 93.1 MHz signed on the air on June 19, 1996, as KWCC, and switched to its current KMCS call sign on November 2, 2005.

=== 93 Country ===
The former KWCC was branded as 93 Country from its inauguration in 1996 until 2005. During this time, the station played a country music format, and mixed modern country with classic country. Syndicated programming included "Colleen's Classic Country USA" and "The Crook & Chase Countdown."

=== Mac FM 94.7 - 93.1 (2005–2013) ===
In November 2005, the station switched to an adult hits format, along with Clinton-based sister station KZEG. Both stations were branded as "Mac FM," with the Muscatine station changing its call letters to KMCS (to stand for "Mac South"); KZEG switched its call letters to KMCN, to stand for "Mac North." The music mix included rock, pop and soul music, generally from the early 1970s to the present day.

George Lowe was the radio voice for "Mac 93.1 FM."

=== Vintage Sound 93.1 FM (2013–2019) ===
The "Vintage Sound 93.1" format debuted on January 14, 2013, and was exclusive to the frequency; KMCN continued with the "Mac FM" format. The format featured classic rock along with less-mainstream rock, classic blues and other genres. The on-air lineup includes "The Tony Tone Show" weekday mornings, Wes Jordan in middays, Pippa in afternoons, and the syndicated night show "Nights with Alice Cooper", which began in April 2014. All three local personalities were previously heard on KBEA-FM in the Quad Cities.

=== 93.1 The Buzz (2019–2025) ===
On December 9, 2019, at 7 a.m., KMCS flipped to mainstream rock, branded as "93.1 The Buzz".

=== MC93 (2025–present) ===
In November 2024, amid the bankruptcy of then-owner JAM Media Solutions, an agreement was reached to sell KMCS and sister station KWPC to Kreiger Media Company for $250,000.

On May 18, 2025, after the sale was completed, KMCS dropped the mainstream rock format and began stunting with Christmas music performed by classic country acts. On May 23, 2025, the station flipped to an 80s/90s/2000s adult hits format branded as "MC93".
