= KFQC =

- Davenport, Iowa; United States
- Frequency: 1580 kHz

Ownership
- Owner: Quad City Minority Broadcasters, Inc.

History
- First air date: November 17, 1952
- Last air date: 1998
- Former call signs: KFMA (1952–1960); KWNT (1960–1982); KXRK (1982–1985); KTSS (1985–1989); KBQC (1989–1990)
- Call sign meaning: "Family Radio for the Quad Cities", from format in 1990

Technical information
- Facility ID: 2235
- Class: D
- Power: 500 watts (day); 7 watts (night)
- Transmitter coordinates: 41°34′15″N 90°34′51″W

KFQC was a radio station licensed to Davenport, Iowa, United States, serving the Quad Cities area and broadcasting on 1580 AM. It was last owned by Quad City Minority Broadcasters, Inc., and operated from 1952 to 1998.

Established as a country music station in 1952 under the call letters KFMA and later KWNT, the frequency became home to a host of revolving formats and owners after 1982. Local media critic Alan Sivell noted that it "changed ownership and formats almost as regularly as dental check-ups are recommended".

== History ==
=== KFMA ===
On February 17, 1951, the KFMA Broadcasting Company filed an application with the Federal Communications Commission for a new radio station to serve Davenport on 1580 kHz. However, even by the time the successful construction permit application was made, substantial work had gone into the new station. Ground was broken at the transmitter site, along the northern edge of Davenport, on February 3, 1950. However, problems had tied up one of the principal owners of the proposed KFMA at the FCC. Larry W. Andrews was involved with a station in Ely, Minnesota, WXLT, whose license was ordered revoked due to an unauthorized transfer of control that he claimed occurred without his knowledge; as a result, the FCC moved to revoke the construction permit for KFMA unless Andrews filed for a hearing, which he did. Even as work on the facilities was described as being in its "final stages" in July, Andrews then opted to drop his application and devote himself full-time to a radio school he had set up to train future broadcasters, but the KFMA Broadcasting Company was incorporated to pursue a construction permit for the station, with local Masonic leader Arthur D. Peirce as its sole officer.

The FCC granted the new construction permit on May 7, 1952, on the condition that the two towers that had already been built at the site be removed. The station began broadcasting on November 17 of that year as Davenport's third local service, with no network affiliation. In 1955, the company was acquired by Lester and Dorothy Gould of Jacksonville, North Carolina; the FCC approved in January 1956. The Goulds filed within months to improve KFMA's facilities by moving its studios to 415 Perry Street, previously a downtown sales office, and upgrade to 500 watts from 250.

=== KWNT ===
Doralcar Associates of Chicago acquired KFQC in 1958; the firm was owned by Alex Clark, a real estate company owner, and WGN announcer Howard Dorsey. The call letters were changed to KWNT, pronounced "quint", on February 1, 1960, in line with its habit of calling the multi-city area the "Quint-Cities". At that time, the disc jockeys started wearing red blazers as a symbol of the station. Right after the change, the station was acquired by Frank and Lynne Babcock and sold in 1962 to Robert W. and Oneita Schmidt; both the Babcocks and Schmidts were from Chicago. The Schmidts expanded KWNT and its country music programming to the FM band with the launch of a full-time simulcast, KWNT-FM 106.5, on September 1, 1966. The FM station was sold to Moline, Illinois, station WQUA in 1972.

After more than a year of illness, Robert Schmidt died in 1974. Robert's widow Oneita sold KWNT three years later to Hallstrom Communications, then in the process of selling WRAM at Galesburg, Illinois; the new owner stated he would not change the format.

=== KXRK and KTSS ===
In 1982, Hallstrom moved KWNT from facilities on Mound Street, which it had occupied since 1960, to a new building on 11th Street and replaced the long-running country format and KWNT call sign with the syndicated Music of Your Life standards format under the new designation of KXRK. General manager Terry Loder was not kind to the legacy of the outgoing format and name, stating that KWNT was "a station that had been floundering for 15 years and has been known for all types of things other than quality".

After Hallstrom sold KXRK to Timothy P. Anderson for $350,000 in October 1984, The standards format was abandoned in March 1985 when the station switched to adult contemporary and new call letters KTSS (known on air as "KT-Sixteen"), citing a lack of advertiser support and a wider potential audience. The adult contemporary programming lasted less than a year, and before 1985 was over, the station had changed to urban contemporary. While airing this format, the station took part in a project to promote the plight of the area's homeless during which program director Terry Haywood spent 10 days living on the streets. The format was successful enough to give KTSS steady ratings and advertising for a time.

However, the flirtation with adult contemporary proved expensive. In mid-1987, KTSS filed for Chapter 11 bankruptcy reorganization; when the station was to shut down on August 14, a Friday, the DJs opted to work without pay for a weekend and host a fundraising drive to make up a $7,000 shortfall. The fundraiser drew less than half that sum, but enough money was raised to keep KTSS going while new financing was sought; Haywood also blamed advertisers reticent to buy air time on a station with a primarily Black audience. A month later, on September 22, the station went silent, citing both transmitter and financial issues. Temporarily, KFMH in Muscatine, Iowa, paid the electricity bill and used the 1580 frequency to simulcast its FM programming. There were several opt-outs from the main KFMH programming, notably old airchecks from a new KFMH DJ's morning show on another station and a weekend oldies show.

=== Religious programming ===
Salvation for the AM station would ultimately come from a religious group. In 1987, the Valley General Baptist Church of Bettendorf, Iowa, incorporated Valley Broadcast Ministries and acquired KBQC-FM 93.5, a failing station, switching it to gospel music. Two years later, the ministry filed to buy KTSS from its trustees for $70,000.

Within a year, however, the Baptist church found the Christian radio business too expensive and opted to sell both of its stations. Faith Walk Christian Center in Silvis, Illinois, acquired the AM station, which had also taken on the KBQC call sign, and renamed it KFQC "Family Radio in the Quad Cities", operating it under the banner of Christian Family Media. The radio station's studios also moved across the Mississippi River to Silvis from Davenport; the church was expanding on property in that town.

=== The final years ===
Christian Family Media reached a deal to sell KFQC to Richard "Andy" Andresen, long a contract engineer at various radio stations in the Quad Cities, in late 1993. Andresen had developed and sold radio automation equipment, giving him the cash to make the acquisition; he immediately began programming the station while the sale was pending, returning it to a standards format. The FCC approved the sale in February 1994, and construction began in Davenport on studios in shopping center space once used for driver's license examinations, with Andresen doing much of the work himself to save money. In the meantime, KFQC broadcast from studio space at KFMH.

Having desired to own a station and saved up for it, Andresen was reluctant to sell. However, in advance of the passage of the Telecommunications Act of 1996 and the likely media consolidation it would lead to, Andresen opted to exit the station ownership business and focus on engineering work and marketing his automation products. KFQC was sold to a Des Moines-based buyer, Quad City Minority Broadcasting. The format under Quad City Minority Broadcasters was urban contemporary. It was the first time the format had been attempted since the folding of KTSS in 1987.

KFQC disappeared with little fanfare in 1998. In 1999, an involuntary bankruptcy petition was filed against the licensee. In 2008, a Chicago radio station, WKKD in Aurora, Illinois, considered moving across the state to Silvis to permit a power increase for a co-owned station in Evanston, Illinois.
