= WJRE =

Coordinates: 41.227°N 89.935°W

Galva, Illinois; United States
- Broadcast area: Kewanee, Geneseo
- Frequency: 102.5 MHz (HD Radio)
- Branding: Hog Country 102.5 WJRE

Programming
- Format: Country
- Subchannels: HD2: Jack FM 102 (Adult hits); HD3: 104.7 Rock 2.0 (Rock); HD4: WKEI simulcast
- Affiliations: Fox News, Nash Nights Live, CMT Radio Network, RFD Illinois

Ownership
- Owner: Fletcher M. Ford; (Virden Broadcasting Corp.)
- Sister stations: KQCJ, WKEI

History
- First air date: May 20, 1966 (as WKEI-FM at 92.1)
- Former call signs: WKEI-FM (1966–1974)
- Former frequencies: 92.1 MHz (1966–1996); 93.9 MHz (1996–2003)
- Call sign meaning: J for John, R for Rick, E for Eddie. Employees of the station in the late 1960s.

Technical information
- Licensing authority: FCC
- Facility ID: 12236
- Class: A
- ERP: 6,000 watts
- HAAT: 89.3 meters (293 ft)
- Translators: HD2: 102.1 W271BL (Kewanee); HD3: 104.7 W284CV (Kewanee)

Links
- Public license information: Public file; LMS
- Website: www.regionaldailynews.com

WJRE (102.5 FM) is a radio station licensed to Galva, Illinois, with studios in Kewanee, Illinois. WJRE plays a traditional country format, with a mix of songs from the 1970s through today. WJRE is operated by Fletcher M. Ford, the President and owner of Regional Media, a Virden Broadcasting Corporation and is licensed to Galva, Illinois. Main studios are located in Kewanee, IL with a remote studio and offices in another area.

WJRE broadcasts in the HD Radio format.

== History ==
- May 20, 1966 - WKEI-FM went on the air, providing the Tri-County area (Henry, Bureau, and Stark) with its first local FM signal at 92.1 MHz.
- March 1, 1974 - WKEI-FM became WJRE, which operated on a frequency of 92.1 MHz.
- October 1, 1996 - The frequency was changed to 93.9 MHz, with 3,100 watts of power from a 453-foot tower northeast of Kewanee, substantially increasing WJRE's coverage area.
- May 1, 2003, midnight - The frequency was changed to 102.5 MHz from a tower south of Galva, with 3,000 watts of power.
- November 3, 2005 at 4 p.m., WJRE switched to a new transmitter on Beach Street in Kewanee, sharing facilities with sister station WKEI. WJRE now operates at 6,000 watts.
- January 1, 2007 at 6 a.m., WJRE changed music format from Hot Adult Contemporary (Hot AC) to a country music format.
- February 1, 2018 at 12:01 a.m., WJRE launched "104.7 Rock 2.0", a rock music format on their HD3 channel and translator W284CV.
