= KALA (FM) =

Davenport, Iowa; United States
- Broadcast area: Quad Cities
- Frequency: 88.5 MHz (HD Radio)

Programming
- Format: Public Radio - News, Jazz and Variety
- Subchannels: HD1: Analog simulcast; HD2: KALA Alternative Programming [+ 106.1 FM]; HD3: The Stinger
- Affiliations: National Public Radio; Public Radio Exchange

Ownership
- Owner: St. Ambrose University

History
- First air date: November 4, 1967; 58 years ago
- Call sign meaning: Ambrose Language Arts

Technical information
- Licensing authority: FCC
- Facility ID: 62090
- Class: C3
- ERP: 10,000 watts
- HAAT: 98.5 meters (323 ft)
- Transmitter coordinates: 41°32′28″N 90°34′57″W
- Translator: HD2: 106.1 K291BP (Bettendorf)

Links
- Public license information: Public file; LMS
- Webcast: Listen Live
- Website: KALA Online

KALA (88.5 MHz) is a non-commercial public FM radio station in Davenport, Iowa, serving the Quad Cities radio market. It is owned by St. Ambrose University with studios on West Locust Street. It airs a mix of news and specialty music shows. Most of the news programs come from National Public Radio (NPR) and the Public Radio Exchange (PRX). The station's musical lineup includes mainstream and fusion jazz, blues, Americana music, Southern gospel, urban gospel, Latin contemporary, classic rock, oldies, urban contemporary, world music, classic R&B, indie rock and alternative rock.

KALA has an effective radiated power of 10,000 watts, using a directional antenna. Its transmitter is on West 76th Street and West Kimberly Road, near Interstate 280 in Davenport. KALA broadcasts using HD Radio technology. Its HD2 digital subchannel feeds 250-watt FM translator K29BP at 106.1 MHz in Bettendorf.

During the week, KALA features public service programming (both syndicated and locally produced). There are local, state, and national newscasts. The station also features live radio programs, St. Ambrose University campus news, a local calendar of events, daily weather updates, and student-run music shows. A mainstay of the station's commitment to the university community is its live coverage of St. Ambrose University sports events. This includes SAU's Fighting Bees/Queen Bees basketball, football, and baseball, softball, soccer, and more.

KALA also features an online station by students for students. "The Stinger" plays Top 40 hits, country, alternative, and rock music, along with music and talk shows hosted by student DJs.

== History ==
The station signed on the air on November 4, 1967. It was originally powered at 10 watts, only heard on campus. But it later got a boost to its current power.
