= WVIK =

Public radio station in Rock Island, Illinois

Rock Island, Illinois; United States
- Broadcast area: Quad Cities
- Frequency: 90.3 MHz (HD Radio)
- Branding: Quad Cities NPR

Programming
- Format: Public radio; news/talk
- Subchannels: HD2: Classical music
- Affiliations: NPR

Ownership
- Owner: Augustana College

History
- First air date: August 25, 1980
- Former frequencies: 90.1 MHz (1980–1991)

Technical information
- Licensing authority: FCC
- Facility ID: 3242
- Class: C1
- ERP: 31,000 watts
- HAAT: 334 meters (1,096 ft)
- Translators: 95.9 K240DZ (Dubuque); HD2: 98.3 W252EM (Davenport)

Links
- Public license information: Public file; LMS
- Webcast: Listen live
- Website: wvik.org

WVIK (90.3 FM) is the flagship National Public Radio station for the Quad Cities region of eastern Iowa and northwest Illinois. It is based in Rock Island, Illinois, and licensed to and owned by Augustana College. The studios are located on Augustana's campus on 38th Street in Rock Island. The station also operates two low-powered translators – K240DZ at 95.9 FM in Dubuque, Iowa, relays its main programming, and W252EM at 98.3 in Davenport, Iowa, carries WVIK's second HD Radio channel.

== History ==
The station signed on for the first time on August 25, 1980, on 90.1 FM. The Quad Cities had been one of the last areas of Iowa and Illinois without a city-grade signal from an NPR station. Prior to 1980, the only source of NPR programming in the area had been a low-powered translator of Cedar Falls' KUNI, though much of the area got grade B coverage from Iowa City's WSUI. In 1991, it moved to its current frequency, and activated its Dubuque translator in 1996.

In March 2022, WVIK announced plans to realign its programming streams. The full-power 90.3 FM signal would drop its afternoon classical music block to air NPR news and talk programming full time, while the Davenport translator would air classical music full-time. As part of the realignment, the 105.7 FM frequency would be upgraded to cover more of the Quad Cities.

On May 1, 2023, the programming realignment on WVIK took place with WVIK's main signal airing NPR news and talk and the translator airing classical music. The station's HD2 subcarrier became a simulcast of the Davenport translator.

== Translators ==
Call sign	Frequency	City of license	FID	ERP (W)	HAAT	Class	Transmitter coordinates	FCC info	Notes
K240DZ	95.9 FM	Dubuque, Iowa	77016	153	47.9 m (157 ft)	D	42°29′47.2″N 90°41′9″W	LMS	—
W252EM	98.3 FM	Davenport, Iowa	153553	250	0 m (0 ft)	D	41°28′29″N 90°26′45″W	LMS	Relays HD2
