= KRBG =

Radio station in Umbarger–Amarillo, Texas

- Umbarger, Texas; United States
- Broadcast area: Amarillo, Texas
- Frequency: 88.7 MHz
- Branding: Radio By Grace

Programming
- Format: Contemporary Christian

Ownership
- Owner: Grace Community Church of Amarillo
- Sister stations: KBZD

History
- First air date: 2008
- Former call signs: KWDH (2006–2008, CP)
- Call sign meaning: Radio By Grace

Technical information
- Licensing authority: FCC
- Facility ID: 93643
- Class: C3
- ERP: 9,500 watts
- HAAT: 114 meters
- Transmitter coordinates: 34°53′50″N 102°14′8″W
- Translator: see below

Links
- Public license information: Public file; LMS
- Webcast: Listen Live
- Website: radiobygrace.com

KRBG (88.7 FM) is a radio station licensed to serve Umbarger, Texas. The station is owned by Grace Community Church of Amarillo. It airs a Religious radio format.

The station was assigned the KWDH call letters by the Federal Communications Commission on October 11, 2006. On October 1, 2008, it changed to the current call sign of KRBG.

KRBG's programming is also heard on sister station KBZD (99.7 FM) in Amarillo, Texas.

== Translators ==
KRBG programming is also carried on multiple broadcast translator stations to extend or improve the coverage area of the main station.

Call sign	Frequency	City of license	FID	ERP (W)	Class	FCC info
K243CE	96.5 FM	Amarillo, Texas	157665	55	D	LMS
K207FF	89.3 FM	Big Spring, Texas	92372	115	D	LMS
K204GS	88.7 FM	Borger, Texas	154856	75	D	LMS
K279AT	103.7 FM	Borger, Texas		75	D	
K204FP	88.7 FM	Childress, Texas	154969	205	D	LMS
K215FS	90.9 FM	Dalhart, Texas	154894	142	D	LMS
K204GP	88.7 FM	Dumas, Texas		140	D	
K269HH	101.7 FM	Lubbock, Texas	142374	100	D	LMS
K271DE	102.1 FM	Lubbock, Texas	142023	75	D	LMS
K205GH	88.9 FM	Pampa, Texas	154954	75	D	LMS
K227BJ	93.3 FM	Plainview, Texas	142024	99	D	LMS
K213EW	90.5 FM	San Angelo, Texas	91707	55	D	LMS
K201HZ	88.1 FM	Tulia, Texas	154998	250	D	LMS
