= WOC (AM) =

- Davenport, Iowa; United States
- Broadcast area: Quad Cities
- Frequency: 1420 kHz
- Branding: WOC News Talk 1420

Programming
- Format: News/Talk
- Affiliations: Compass Media Networks; Fox News Radio; Premiere Networks; Iowa Hawkeyes

Ownership
- Owner: iHeartMedia, Inc.; (iHM Licenses, LLC)
- Sister stations: KCQQ; KMXG; KUUL; WFXN; WLLR-FM

History
- First air date: February 18, 1922 (Experimental transmissions date from 1907)
- Call sign meaning: Randomly assigned, but station later adopted the slogan World (also Wonders) of Chiropractic

Technical information
- Licensing authority: FCC
- Facility ID: 60360
- Class: B
- Power: 5,000 watts
- Transmitter coordinates: 41°33′0.12″N 90°28′37.48″W

Links
- Public license information: Public file; LMS
- Webcast: Listen live (via iHeartRadio)
- Website: woc1420.iheart.com

WOC (1420 kHz) is a commercial radio station, licensed to Davenport, Iowa, and serving the Quad Cities area with a news/talk radio format. WOC is among America's oldest radio stations and is owned by iHeartMedia, Inc. Its studios are located on East Kimberly Road in Davenport, and its transmitter is located at an antenna farm in Bettendorf, Iowa. WOC broadcasts with 5,000 watts, using a directional antenna to avoid interfering with other stations on 1420 kHz.

== Programming ==
Weekdays begin with a news and interview program hosted by Doug Wagner and shared with co-owned WMT in Cedar Rapids. In afternoon drive time, another Iowa-based program is heard, hosted by Simon Conway from co-owned WHO in Des Moines. The rest of the weekday schedule is nationally syndicated talk shows, mostly from Premiere Networks: The Glenn Beck Radio Program, The Clay Travis and Buck Sexton Show, The Sean Hannity Show, The Joe Pags Show, Coast to Coast AM with George Noory and Markley, VanCamp & Robbins.

Weekends feature shows on money, home repair, technology and the law. Syndicated programs include The Kim Komando Show, Bill Handel on the Law, At Home with Gary Sullivan, Armstrong & Getty, The Ben Ferguson Show and Sunday Nights with Bill Cunningham. Some weekday shows are repeated and some hours are paid brokered programming. Fox News Radio supplies national news at the beginning of each hour, while local news and weather updates are provided by former sister station KWQC-TV. The station is also the Quad Cities affiliate for University of Iowa Hawkeyes sports.

== Pre-history ==
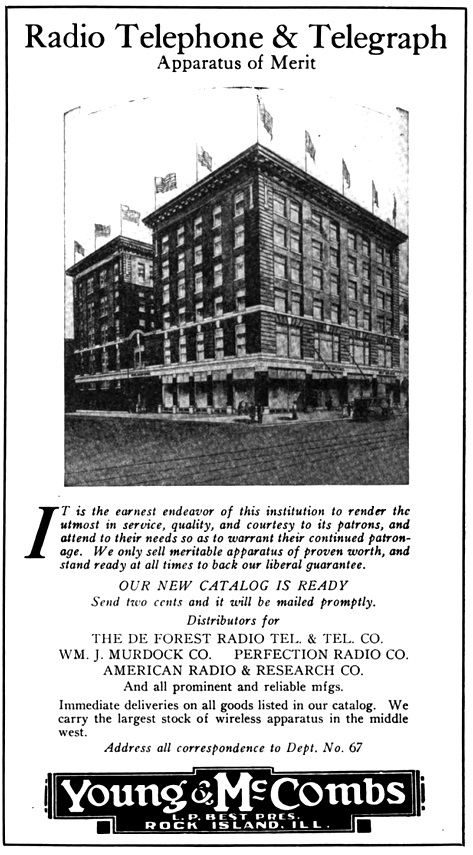
Advertisement for radio equipment sold by the Young & McCombs department store in Rock Island, which featured a photograph of the Best Building where the store was located. (March 1920)

WOC's pre-history was complex, with roots extending back to the earliest days of radio.

Robert K. Karlowa had an longtime interest in radiotelegraphy, starting in 1907, and by early 1913 was "the chief operator of the Tri-Cities Wireless club", which met on the sixth floor of the Best Building in Rock Island, Illinois. In mid-1915, he and Ray E. Hall, representing the Tri-City Radio Laboratory, were issued an Experimental license for station 9XR, (Note: The "9" in 9XR's call sign identified the station as being located in the ninth Radio Inspection district, while the "X" indicated that it was operating under an experimental license.) which also operated from the Best Building. This station used a spark transmitter and could only transmit Morse code, so it was never used for entertainment broadcasts. Moreover, effective April 6, 1917, with the entrance of the United States into World War One, all civilian stations were ordered to shut down for the duration of the war, and 9XR permanently disappeared.

The civilian ban on radio stations was lifted in October 1919, and the introduction of vacuum-tube radio transmitters now made audio broadcasts possible. Karlowa's subsequent activities were divided between two separate stations. Karlowa himself was issued a standard amateur license, with call sign 9BC, for his home in Davenport, Iowa. On December 3, 1919, he began broadcasting a series of radio concerts.

A second standard amateur license, 9BY, was issued in the name of the Young & McCombs co-operative store, located in the Best Building in Rock Island, Illinois, where Karlowa was the head of the radio department. This station would feature an even more extensive selection of programs. It was announced that, starting about September 1, 1920, 9BY was planning to inaugurate concerts to be broadcast on Thursday evenings. A few weeks later, on election day, November 2, the station was reported to be planning to broadcast election results, and later that month it was reported that 9BY's weekly broadcasts featured promotional phonograph records provided by the Pathé Frères Phonograph Company.

In early 1921, Karlowa formed the Karlowa Radio Corporation, which bought the Young & Combs radio department assets, and took over operation of 9BY, still located in the Best Building in Rock Island. The station maintained its Thursday evening concert schedule.

== WOC history ==
WOC's history is also complex. Effective December 1, 1921, the U.S. government adopted a regulation requiring that stations making broadcasts intended for the public now had to hold a Limited Commercial license. On February 18, 1922, the Karlowa Radio Corporation was issued a new license, for a broadcasting station with the randomly assigned call letters of WOC, still located in the Rock Island Best Building. Karlowa continued to operate the station for a short time, but realized he was in over its head operating a full-service commercial station. In particular the costs had become too great for him to abdorb. In March he sold WOC to Col. B. J. Palmer, and on May 9, 1922, a new license was issued for the Palmer School of Chiropractic (later the Palmer College of Chiropractic) in Davenport, Iowa, the start of a family connection that lasted almost 75 years. The phrase "World Of Chiropractic" was often used with the station ID.

The station equipment was moved to a small studio on Palmer's Brady Street campus. WOC initially broadcast on the common Entertainment wavelength of 360 meters (833 kilohertz), and on October 14 was authorized to also broadcast weather reports on 485 meters (619 kilohertz). In October it was upgraded to a state-of-the-art 500 watt Western Electric transmitter, which allowed WOC to move to the more exclusive "Class B" wavelength of 400 meters (750 kilohertz). In May 1923, 620 kilohertz was reserved as a Class B frequency assignment for qualified stations in "Davenport/Des Moines, Iowa", and WOC was authorized to move to this new frequency.

In 1924, the American Telephone & Telegraph Company was in the process of forming a radio network, with its flagship at WEAF in New York City. While in the planning stages, WOC was identified as one of 21 stations thought to be "especially desirable because of coverage and reliable technical performance". On July 4, 1925, the station participated in the network's "National Defense Test Day" program. In September 1927, WOC became a charter member of the new NBC radio network.

The Federal Radio Commission's General Order 40 reallocated frequencies in 1928, and WOC was reassigned to share time on 1000 kilohertz with the Banker's Life station in Des Moines, Iowa, WHO. In late 1929, the Central Broadcasting Company was formed with B.J. Palmer as chairman. This company purchased both WOC and WHO, which were then synchronized to simultaneously broadcast identical programs on their shared frequency, each using a 5 kilowatt transmitter.

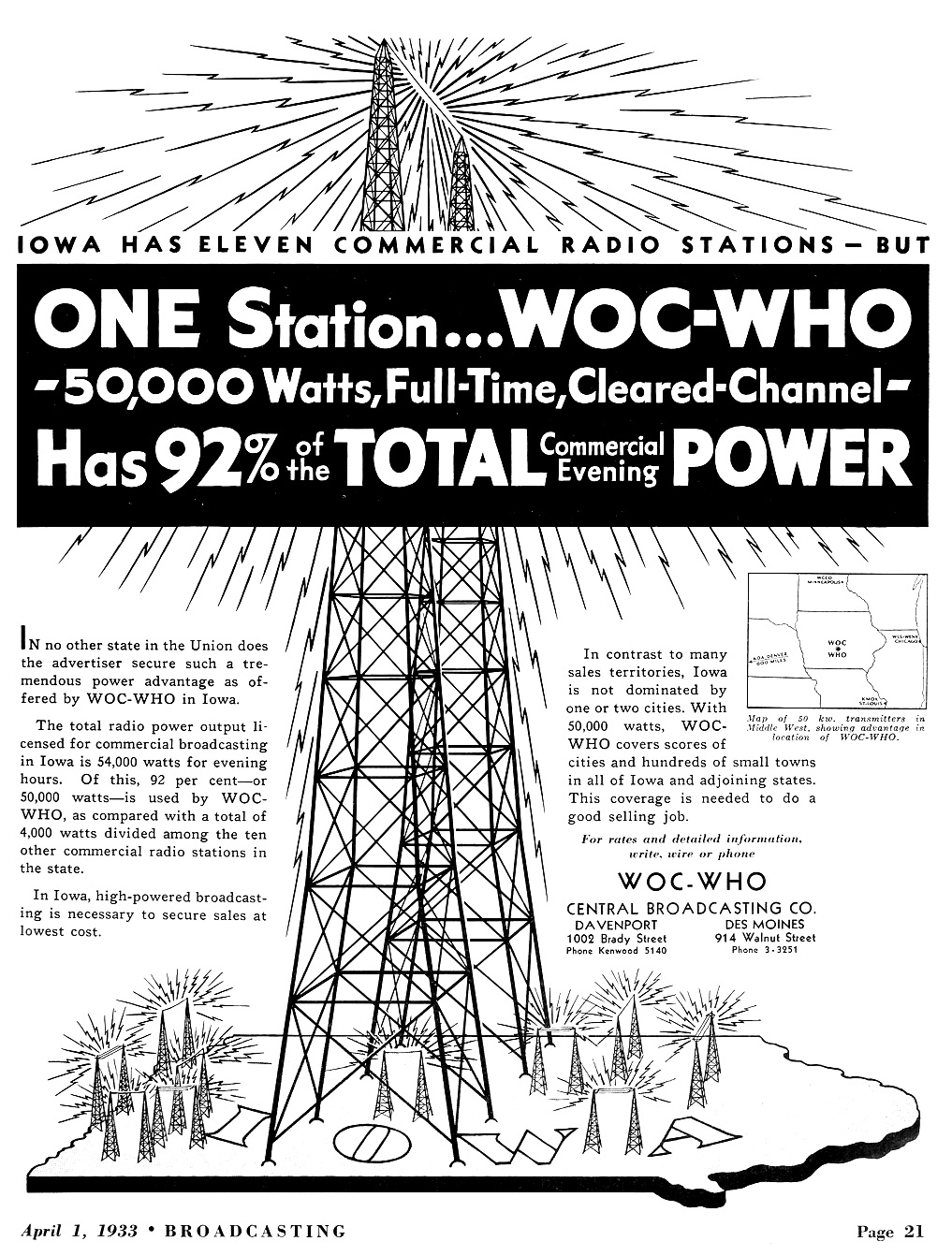
Advertisement for consolidated WOC-WHO (1933)

In April 1932, a 50 kilowatt transmitter, located near Mitchellville, Iowa, and close to Des Moines, went into service, and the separate transmitters were replaced by this single transmitter, with the two stations now combined under a dual identity as WOC-WHO. That same year Ronald Reagan got his first broadcasting job at WOC as a sportscaster. He returned to WOC in 1988, when WOC and FM sister station WLLR-FM dedicated their new studios on East Kimberly Road.

WOC was restored as a station separate from WHO in November 1934, when the Palmer School purchased station KICK in Carter Lake, Iowa, which was moved to Davenport, and its call sign changed to WOC. (Because of this, Federal Communications Commission (FCC) records generally list WOC's "first license date" as December 1, 1923, which was when KICK received its initial license.) (Note: KICK originated as KFLZ, first licensed to the Atlantic Automobile Company in Atlantic, Iowa, on December 1, 1923.) In early 1935 the station was assigned to a "local" frequency of 1370 kilohertz, and by 1937 it was operating with 250 watts daytime and 100 watts at night. In 1941, WOC briefly moved to a second local frequency, 1450 kilohertz, and the next year was upgraded to a "regional" frequency, 1420 kilohertz, its current dial position, with a power boost to 5 kilowatts.

WOC's FM station, WOC-FM, signed on the air in October 1948 at 103.7 MHz. The FM station has changed formats three times, currently with a country music format as WLLR-FM, and is the highest-rated station in the Quad Cities market.

WOC-TV, the first television station in Iowa, began broadcasting on October 31, 1949; it became KWQC-TV after the Palmer family split its radio and television holdings in 1986. The AM frequency, meanwhile, has undergone several format changes since the end of the Golden Age of Radio. Its current news/talk radio format started in 1979.

In 1986 WOC and its FM sister station were purchased from Palmer Communications, Inc. by Vickie Anne Palmer and her then husband, J. Douglas Miller. In 1989 Mr. Miller entered the motion picture business as a producer and Ms. Palmer took over complete control of the properties, then known as Signal Hill Communications, Inc., until it was sold in 1996. The station was purchased by Clear Channel Communications, now iHeartMedia, in 2000.

WOC is the oldest surviving broadcasting station in the middle Mississippi Valley. Other reported firsts include:

- Broadcasting from both houses of the Iowa Legislature.
- On-air and studio personnel required to keep logs of such things as electrical consumption and on-air programming (to the second). The programming log also helped the station begin programs on an absolute "minute-and-second" schedule.
- Use of a fader panel, allowing use of several microphones in the studio at one time.

== See also ==
- List of initial AM-band station grants in the United States
- List of three-letter broadcast call signs in the United States
