= KMXG =

- Clinton, Iowa; United States
- Broadcast area: Greater Quad Cities
- Frequency: 96.1 MHz
- Branding: Mix 96.1

Programming
- Format: Adult contemporary
- Affiliations: Premiere Networks

Ownership
- Owner: iHeartMedia, Inc.; (iHM Licenses, LLC)
- Sister stations: KCQQ, KUUL, WFXN, WLLR-FM, WOC

History
- First air date: 1947; 79 years ago (as KROS-FM)
- Former call signs: KROS-FM (1947–1974); KSAY (1974–1986); KLIO (1986–1989); KMJC (1989–1993)
- Call sign meaning: "Mix"

Technical information
- Licensing authority: FCC
- Facility ID: 60359
- Class: C1
- ERP: 100,000 watts
- HAAT: 299 meters (981 ft)
- Transmitter coordinates: 41°37′58.1″N 90°24′38.4″W

Links
- Public license information: Public file; LMS
- Webcast: Listen live (via iHeartRadio)
- Website: mix96online.iheart.com

KMXG (96.1 FM, "Mix 96") is a commercial radio station licensed to Clinton, Iowa, and serving the Quad Cities area of Iowa and Illinois. It broadcasts an adult contemporary radio format, switching to Christmas music from mid-November until the Christmas holidays. KMXG is owned by iHeartMedia, Inc., with studios and offices in Davenport, Iowa, along with co-owned KUUL-FM, WLLR-FM, KCQQ-FM, WFXN and WOC.

The station has an effective radiated power (ERP) of 100,000 watts, and their transmitter is located off 225th Street in rural LeClaire in Scott County.

== History ==
=== Early history (1947–1986) ===
KMXG originally had studios in Clinton and was co-owned with KROS (1340 AM). At that time, 96.1 had the call letters KROS-FM and later KSAY. During its run as KROS-FM, the station simulcast the AM signal initially, and later aired a beautiful music format, with quarter hour sweeps of instrumental cover versions of popular songs.

During its years in Clinton, KSAY operated as a religious station serving primarily the Gateway area (Clinton and Jackson counties in Iowa; Whiteside and Carroll in Illinois) from 1974 until 1986. During this time, a February 1985 fire that struck the building where the studios for KSAY and KROS were located knocked the station off the air for several days; when the station returned to the air in a new studio, the first program was a two-hour show devoted to the fire and volunteers that helped get KROS-KSAY back on the air.

=== Adult contemporary era (1986–present) ===
Upon 96.1 FM's move to the Quad Cities, the station was known as KLIO-FM (K-Lite) and aired adult contemporary music. The call letters changed several years later to KMJC ("Magic 96") in November 1989 before adopting the current KMXG ("Mix 96") call sign in July 1993.

Starting in 2008, during the holiday season, KMXG switches to an all-holiday music format.

==== Weekend programming ====
Sometime during the 2000s, KMXG began programming a "retro Saturday" block of music, focusing on hits of the 1980s with some hits from the 1970s and early 1990s mixed in. Syndicated programming added included Backtrax USA (both the 1980s and 1990s versions), Retro Pop Reunion and American Top 40: The 80s. With the demise of KUUL-FM's oldies format in 2012, several of KUUL's former programs were added to KMXG's weekend lineup, including American Top 40: The 70s, Into the 70s with John Landecker and The 70s with Steve Goddard. As such, Saturdays are devoted to 1980s and 1990s music, while Sundays feature music of the 1970s. For nearly two years, until format changes to classic hits and adult hits at WYEC and KQCS, respectively, KMXG's weekend programming was the only regularly scheduled classic hits radio programming, featuring music of the 1970s through 1990s, available in the Quad-Cities market.

Continuing on Sundays were two three-hour blocks of smooth jazz music: "Jazz Patio" and "Smooth Jazz Sunday Night", both hosted by Art Monroe. Jazz music has been a staple of 96.1 FM since at least its incarnation as KLIO, with different hosts through the years.
