= WFXN (AM) =

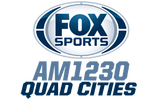
- Moline, Illinois; United States
- Broadcast area: Greater Quad Cities
- Frequency: 1230 kHz
- Branding: Fox Sports 1230

Programming
- Format: Sports
- Affiliations: Fox Sports Radio; Illinois Fighting Illini football; Illinois Fighting Illini men's basketball; Packers Radio Network; Quad City Storm

Ownership
- Owner: iHeartMedia, Inc.; (iHM Licenses, LLC)
- Sister stations: KCQQ, KMXG, KUUL, WLLR-FM, WOC

History
- First air date: 1946 (as WQUA)
- Former call signs: WQUA (1946–1983); WMRZ (1983–1990); WLLR (1990–2003)

Technical information
- Licensing authority: FCC
- Facility ID: 43199
- Class: C
- Power: 1,000 watts unlimited
- Transmitter coordinates: 41°28′54.12″N 90°31′49.49″W

Links
- Public license information: Public file; LMS
- Webcast: Listen live (via iHeartRadio)
- Website: foxsportsradio1230.iheart.com

WFXN (1230 kHz) is a sports formatted AM radio station licensed to Moline, Illinois. The station is owned by iHeartMedia, Inc. with studios located in Davenport, Iowa. The station is known as "Fox Sports 1230".

AM 1230 broadcasts at a power of 1 kW with transmitter located on 7th Street in Moline between 30th and 32nd Avenues.

== History ==
The station originally signed on September 23, 1946, as WQUA. Like its main competitor, KSTT (which signed on just two months earlier), the new station had a wide range of local programming, news and sports, plus played popular music of the day.

From the 1950s until the late 1970s, WQUA ran a Top 40 music format, and introduced the area to personalities such as Spike O'Dell, Paula Sands and Jim Albracht. WQUA and KSTT battled in the ratings as the most-listened-to station for years.

WQUA later went through various format changes. In late 1983, the station dropped adult contemporary and adopted an oldies format, using the call letters WMRZ with General Manager John Haggard, Program Director & Middays; Chad Stevens, Mornings; Dan Lucas, and Afternoons; Marty McCrae and Sandy McKay. Two years later it was sold to WLLR-FM. Then, on January 2, 1990, the station began simulcasting WLLR's FM signal, and did so for 13 years. Prior to the station's adoption of the all-sports format, and thereafter, AM 1230 offered sports programming, primarily of Illinois Fighting Illini college athletics and Western Big 6 high school sports.

The current sports format and call letters were first used in April 2003.
