= KCQQ =

- Davenport, Iowa; United States
- Broadcast area: Quad Cities
- Frequency: 106.5 MHz
- Branding: Big 106.5

Programming
- Format: Classic hits
- Affiliations: Westwood One

Ownership
- Owner: iHeartMedia, Inc.; (iHM Licenses, LLC)
- Sister stations: KMXG, KUUL, WFXN, WLLR-FM, WOC

History
- First air date: 1966 (as KWNT-FM)
- Former call signs: KWNT-FM (1966–1973); KRVR (1973–1995)

Technical information
- Licensing authority: FCC
- Facility ID: 32987
- Class: C1
- ERP: 100,000 watts
- HAAT: 273 meters (896 ft)
- Transmitter coordinates: 41°37′58.1″N 90°24′38.5″W

Links
- Public license information: Public file; LMS
- Webcast: Listen live (via iHeartRadio)
- Website: big1065.iheart.com

KCQQ (106.5 FM, "Big 106.5") is a radio station licensed to Davenport, Iowa, with a classic hits format. The station broadcasts with a power of 100,000 watts from a transmitter located in rural Scott County near LeClaire.

KCQQ is owned by iHeartMedia, Inc., with studios located in Davenport. Other stations located in the same complex are KMXG, KUUL, WLLR-FM, WFXN and WOC.

KCQQ is not licensed to broadcast in the HD Radio (digital) format.

== History ==
When the Quad Cities' allocation for 106.5 FM first signed on in 1966, it was home to the market's first FM country music station. The station was known as KWNT-FM, and for the most part, was simply the FM repeater for KWNT's AM signal (at 1580 kHz). KWNT was a daytime station and was required to sign-off the air at sunset. KWNT-FM briefly had its own talk show after the AM station had signed off for the day. Also, shortly before becoming KRVR, KWNT-FM featured album rock music. It was the first commercial station in the Quad Cities market to do so.

The station continued its country format until the summer 1973, when 106.5 FM was switched to an easy listening/adult contemporary format as KRVR-FM; KWNT continued with the country format for several more years. Fondly known to locals under its slogan "K-River," KRVR continued on with few changes until March 1995, when it switched to a classic hits format, eventually tweaking to classic rock, as KCQQ, "Q-106.5".

From September 1995 through December 31, 2006, KCQQ was the home of the top-rated local morning duo Dwyer and Michaels. At the beginning of 2007, it was announced that the two hosts would return to rival station WXLP in July, where they previously had hosted a morning show. Clear Channel sued Dwyer and Michaels, alleging that they had violated a non-compete clause in their contract. The judge ruled in favor of the duo.

Since January 2007, KCQQ has featured the nationally syndicated The Bob & Tom Show.

Like what WXLP did in late 2014 to early 2015, KCQQ began to add in a few newer tracks to its playlist and also some tracks one would not typically find on a classic rock station. The "new" artists mixed in to the classic rock playlist include Foo Fighters, "Are You Gonna Go My Way" by Lenny Kravitz (along with his late 1990s material), Smashing Pumpkins "1979", "Self Esteem" by the Offspring, "Lightning Crashes" by Live, "Seven Nation Army" by the White Stripes, and "Epic" by Faith No More.

On September 24, 2021, at 1 p.m., after playing "Brain Damage" by Pink Floyd, KCQQ abruptly dropped the classic rock format and flipped back to classic hits as "Big 106.5". The first song played as "Big" was "Tainted Love" by Soft Cell. The change came not because of ratings ("Q" had gone out with a 4.8 share in the August 2021 Nielsen Audio Ratings, significantly behind rival WXLP's 9.9 share, but good enough for 4th place in the market), but to capitalize on the similar flip away from the format by KIIK-FM earlier that day.
