= KUUL =

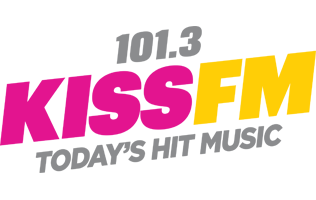

East Moline, Illinois; United States
- Broadcast area: Greater Quad Cities
- Frequency: 101.3 MHz
- Branding: 101-3 KISS FM

Programming
- Format: Top 40 (CHR)
- Affiliations: Premiere Networks

Ownership
- Owner: iHeartMedia, Inc.; (iHM Licenses, LLC)
- Sister stations: KCQQ, KMXG, WFXN, WLLR-FM, WOC

History
- First air date: February 23, 1976 (as WEMO)
- Former call signs: WEMO (1976–1978); WZZC (1978–1982); WLLR (1983–1998)
- Call sign meaning: reference to former "Kool" branding

Technical information
- Licensing authority: FCC
- Facility ID: 43208
- Class: B
- ERP: 50,000 watts
- HAAT: 152 meters (499 ft)
- Transmitter coordinates: 41°37′10.1″N 90°17′41.4″W

Links
- Public license information: Public file; LMS
- Webcast: Listen live (via iHeartRadio)
- Website: 1013kissfm.iheart.com

KUUL (101.3 FM, "101-3 KISS FM") is an American commercial Top 40 (CHR) radio station serving the Quad Cities area. They are owned by iHeartMedia, Inc. with studios located in Davenport, Iowa, and a transmitter located near Port Byron, Illinois.

== History ==
=== Early history (1976–1998) ===
The station began life in February 1976 as WEMO ("EMO" standing for East Moline) and playing adult contemporary music. The station was owned by Upper Rock Island County Holding Corp.

In November 1978, the station was sold to BJM Broadcasting, and the station adopted a country format, with the call letters WZZC. The format change took effect December 3, 1978, and during this time, the station also featured local high school and college sports, as well as St. Louis Cardinals games. The station was also known for sponsoring country music concerts at Palmer Auditorium in Davenport, Iowa; the first show featured Donna Fargo and Tom T. Hall, and comedian George Lindsey.

A change in station ownership came in late 1982 to Sconnix Broadcasting, and in January 1983, the station — while retaining the country music format — changed its call letters to WLLR. During this time, WLLR began a slow climb toward becoming the Quad Cities market's top-rated radio station, a goal achieved in the late 1980s.

=== Oldies era (1998–2012) ===
On March 2, 1998, WLLR's country format swapped frequencies with 103.7 FM's oldies format. At the time of the switch, KUUL's format consisted of rock oldies from the 1950s through early 1970s, but the emphasis gradually shifted toward hits of the 1970s, and at one time, the 1980s, although the station always retained part of its 1960s library.

From 2001 to 2007, KUUL carried The Bob & Tom Show during its morning programming block after originally airing on WHTS, but the show has since been switched to KCQQ. The move coincided with a new morning show teaming Steve Ketelaar and Mark Manuel. Following the 2002 holiday season, the station began adding 1980s hits to its library, dropping nearly all of its pre-1964 music, thereby tweaking the format to an oldies/classic hits hybrid similar to KQQL. That music mix remained in place through 2009, when – after a series of layoffs – the station began automating most of its programming through iHeartRadio's Premium Choice programming; the playlist was shortened to only 1960s and 1970s hits, with approximately two dozen 1980s titles remaining. The only live on-air talent remaining were morning show hosts Mark Manuel and Steve Ketalaar.

During the holiday season (roughly, Thanksgiving to Christmas Day) from 2002 to 2007, KUUL switched to an all-holiday music format. The holiday format moved to KMXG after the 2008 holiday season.

=== Top-40 era (2012–present) ===
On February 20, 2012, KUUL flipped to CHR as "101-3 KISS FM". The last song played on "KUUL 101.3" was "Rock Your Baby" by George McCrae, while the first song played on "KISS FM" was "Turn Me On" by David Guetta and Nicki Minaj. Programming includes Elvis Duran and the Morning Show, one of only two in Iowa to air the show. With the demise of the oldies format, several of KUUL's former programs were moved to sister station KMXG, including American Top 40: The 70s, Into the 70s with John Landecker and The 70s with Steve Goddard. In addition, the morning show, hosted by Manuel and Ketalaar, was moved to sister station WOC. KUUL's programming is made up from Premium Choice lineup.
