= WLLR-FM =

- Davenport, Iowa; United States
- Broadcast area: Quad Cities
- Frequency: 103.7 MHz (HD Radio)
- Branding: 103.7 WLLR

Programming
- Format: Country
- Subchannels: HD2: Alternative rock "Alt 104.5"; HD3: Religious broadcasting "Radio By Grace"
- Affiliations: Premiere Networks

Ownership
- Owner: iHeartMedia; (iHM Licenses, LLC)
- Sister stations: KCQQ; KMXG; KUUL; WFXN; WOC

History
- First air date: October 14, 1948
- Former call signs: WOC-FM (1948–1972); KIIK (1972–1989); KUUL (1989–1998)

Technical information
- Licensing authority: FCC
- Facility ID: 60361
- Class: C0
- ERP: 100,000 watts
- HAAT: 363 meters (1,191 ft)
- Transmitter coordinates: 41°32′49.1″N 90°28′35.5″W
- Translators: HD2: 104.5 K283BV (Davenport); HD3: 107.1 K296GZ (Davenport)

Links
- Public license information: Public file; LMS
- Webcast: Listen live (via iHeartRadio); HD2: Listen live (via iHeartRadio)
- Website: 1037wllr.iheart.com; HD2: alt1045.iheart.com; HD3: www.radiobygrace.com

WLLR-FM (103.7 MHz) is a radio station licensed to Davenport, Iowa, United States, whose format is modern country music. The station broadcasts at a power of 100 kW.

WLLR is owned by iHeartMedia, with studios located in Davenport. Its transmitter site is located in Bettendorf.

== History ==
The Davenport allocation for 103.7 FM – representing the second FM station in the Quad Cities – dates to October 14, 1948, when the station signed on as WOC-FM, a companion to its AM sister station, WOC (1420 AM). The station was owned by the Palmer family, a well-known Quad Cities family that started the Palmer College of Chiropractic.

As with most FM radio stations in the 1950s and 1960s, WOC-FM played mostly easy listening and classical music.

The frequency's first major format change came August 28, 1972, when WOC-FM became the Quad Cities market's first full-time FM rock station. Adopting a Top 40/CHR format, the station's call letters changed to KIIK, and was known to fans as "KIIK 104". KIIK, which initially had a broadcast day of 5 a.m. to 12:30 a.m. before switching to 24 hours, quickly became very popular with Quad Cities-area listeners, and soon became the market's top-rated station.

By the late 1980s, with new competitor station WPXR-FM ("Power 98.9") having taken over the CHR/Top 40 gauntlet, KIIK104's final song, "Cool Change" by Little River Band, was abruptly cut as KIIK changed to a rock oldies station. As KUUL, the station played music from the 1950s through early 1970s; the first song under the new format was "Nobody but Me" by The Human Beinz. The format change became effective on May 1, 1989, and fans soon identified the "KUUL Red Radio" (a jumbo-sized boombox replica) with the station at its live remote broadcast sites.

The most recent change to the station came on March 2, 1998, when KUUL and WLLR (which had aired a country format at 101.3 FM since 1983) swapped frequencies. KUUL's oldies format moved to 101.3 FM, while WLLR's country format took over 103.7 FM.

In December 1985, WLLR briefly gained national attention when one of the station DJ's, Jack Daniels, played the Christmas song "Grandma Got Run Over by a Reindeer" 27 times back-to-back during the morning show for 3½ hours. Station management was eventually able to pull the jockey off the air, placed him on indefinite suspension, and received a 90-day probation by station management. The disc jockey was reportedly depressed and upset that a co-worker had left employment at the station for an out-of-state job. Daniels was eventually reinstated on December 20.

Some of WLLR's best-known personalities include: Mike Kenneally, Ron Evans, Jack Carey, Andy Scott, Jack Daniels, Amy Jeffries, Pat Leuck, Dani Lynn Howe, Tim Carlson, JD Justice and Jim O'Hara.

WLLR's stage at the Mississippi Valley Fair was featured in the Music Video for "Don't Ya Just Wanna Rock and Roll" by Rodney Atkins.

In November 2013, WLLR won the CMA award for 'Small Market Station of the Year'.

Since 1989, WLLR has remained the top-rated station in the Quad Cities, maintaining audience 12+ shares between 10 and 20 for the past 20 years.

== 103.7 HD2 ==
On January 1, 2014, WLLR discontinued its classic country on the HD2 and began broadcasting a classic rock format.

On August 21, 2015, at 1:04 p.m., WLLR-FM HD2 switched to an alternative rock format, branded as "ALT 104.5" (also broadcast on FM translator K283BV 104.5 FM Davenport).

Broadcast translator for WLLR-FM HD2
Call sign	Frequency	City of license	FID	ERP (W)	Class	Transmitter coordinates	FCC info
K283BV	104.5 FM	Davenport, Iowa	140115	250	D	41°32′14.1″N 90°34′30.4″W	LMS

== 103.7 HD3 ==
On April 17, 2022, Radio By Grace, a religious broadcaster and owner of translator K296GZ (107.1 FM; originally licensed to Muscatine, now licensed to Davenport), announced that they had applied to upgrade the translator's signal from 10 watts to 250 watts and to move the transmitter site from Milan, Illinois, to the southwestern portion of Davenport. The application specified that the translator would relay WLLR's HD3 subchannel.

On October 31, 2022, Radio By Grace publicly announced the completion of the construction of the new 250 watt transmitter facility and that the K296GZ translator had commenced broadcasting. The translator carries the Radio By Grace network via WLLR-FM HD3. WLLR and iHeartMedia are simply providing this service to Radio By Grace via a technical services agreement and all programming decisions for WLLR-FM HD3/K296GZ are made by Radio By Grace, Inc.

Broadcast translator for WLLR-FM HD3
Call sign	Frequency	City of license	FID	ERP (W)	Class	Transmitter coordinates	FCC info
K296GZ	107.1 FM	Davenport, Iowa	153605	250	D	41°30′3″N 90°40′24″W	LMS
