= Resmaa Menakem =

American psychotherapist and author

Resmaa Menakem (born Chester Mason, Jr.) is an American author and psychotherapist specialising in the effects of trauma on the human body and the relationship between trauma, white body supremacy, and racism in America.

He is the author of My Grandmother’s Hands: Racialized Trauma and the Pathway to Mending our Hearts and Bodies, published in September 2017, which appeared on the New York Times bestseller list in May 2021 and The Quaking of America: An Embodied Guide to Navigating our Nation's Upheaval and Racial Reckoning, published in 2022. He is also the founder of the Cultural Somatics Institute.

== Career ==
For ten years, Menakem cohosted a radio show with former U.S. Congressman and Minnesota Attorney General Keith Ellison on KMOJ-FM in Minneapolis. He also hosted his own show, “Resmaa in the Morning,” on KMOJ.

Menakem has served as the director of counseling services for Tubman Family Alliance, a domestic violence treatment center in Minneapolis; the behavioral health director for African American Family Services in Minneapolis; a domestic violence counselor for Wilder Foundation; a divorce and family mediator; a social worker for Minneapolis Public Schools; a youth counselor; a community organizer; and a marketing strategist.

From 2011 to 2013, Menakem was a community care counselor for civilian contractors in Afghanistan, managing the wellness and counseling services on 53 U.S. military bases.

He has appeared on American daytime TV shows The Oprah Winfrey Show and Dr. Phil, the On Being podcast with Krista Tippett, late night talk show Tha God's Honest Truth with Charlemagne the God, iHeart radio's The Breakfast Club with DJ Envy, and the Goop podcast, among many media appearances.
