= Stephanie Santiago =

American model and actress

- Born: New York City, New York, U.S.
- Occupation: Model
- Known for: model, podcast host

Stephanie Santiago is an American model, actress and podcast host. She is the co-host of the Lip Service Podcast alongside Angela Yee of Power 105's The Breakfast Club.

== Lip Service Podcast ==
Santiago hosts the Lip Service Podcast along with GiGi Maguire, a podcast that features the hottest entertainers and media influencers to discuss hot topics, as well as sex and relationships. Rick Ross, T.I., Trina and Plies have been guests on the show.

Santiago and Rick Ross once got into an argument on the show after Ross asked her to pour him a drink and she declined.

== Modeling ==
As a model, Santiago has also appeared in music videos. Most notably, in 2013, Santiago appeared on stage as Bonita Applebum during A Tribe Called Quest's opening set during Kanye West's Yeezus Tour at Madison Square Garden.

In 2013, Complex Magazine named Santiago one of 25 Hottest Urban Models to Follow on Instagram.

== Personal ==
In her downtime, Stephanie Santiago enjoys cooking.

Santiago has been honest about having plastic surgery.

She is a fan of the New York Jets.
