= Ceremonial roll call for the 2020 Democratic National Convention =

Virtual event due to COVID

On the second night of the 2020 Democratic National Convention, a roll call of the states was ceremonially held. Due to the then-ongoing COVID-19 pandemic, the roll call and convention were held virtually rather than in a single venue. Also due to the pandemic, formal voting on the party's nomination was done virtually and in advance of the convention, making the roll call at the convention purely ceremonial.

The roll call saw participation by all of the convention's 57 delegations (including all 50 states and seven additional territories/jurisdictions (the District of Columbia, the five inhabited U.S. territories, and Democrats Abroad). Organizers planned for it to last approximately 30 minutes. Convention secretary Jason Rae directed (MC-ed) the roll call from a podium in the Wisconsin Center in Milwaukee.

The production of the remote roll call was widely praised.

== Order of nominations ==
Announcing their states' delegates' nominations were:

List of speakers announcing delegations' roll-call votes, sortable
State	Speaker	Position/Notability	Location	Notes	Cite
Alabama	Terri Sewell	United States Representative from Alabama	Edmund Pettus Bridge in Selma, Alabama		
Alaska	Chuck Degnan	Veteran, commercial fisherman, Alaska Native leader and Democratic Party activist			
American Samoa	Aliitama Sotoa	Democratic Party leaders of American Samoa			
American Samoa	Patti Matila	Democratic Party leaders of American Samoa			
Arizona	Marisol Garcia	Middle school social studies teacher			
Arkansas	Gilbert Alaquinez	Chef at Clinton Foundation	Clinton Presidential Center in Little Rock, Arkansas		
California	Barbara Lee	United States Representative from California			
California	Hilda Solis	Member of the Los Angeles County Board of Supervisors from the 1st District and former United States Secretary of Labor			
Colorado	Howard Chou	Immigrant and party activist			
Connecticut	Peter Carozza	Retired firefighter and firefighters' union leader	Hartford, Connecticut		
Delaware	John Carney	Governor of Delaware	Joseph R. Biden, Jr., Railroad Station in Wilmington, Delaware	Passed to go last	
Delaware	Tom Carper	United States Senator from Delaware	Joseph R. Biden, Jr., Railroad Station in Wilmington, Delaware	Passed to go last	
Democrats Abroad	Julia Bryan	International Chair of Democrats Abroad	Prague, Czech Republic		
District of Columbia	Muriel Bowser	Mayor of the District of Columbia	Black Lives Matter Plaza in Washington, DC		
Florida	Fred Guttenberg	Gun control activist	Pompano Beach, Florida		
Georgia	Nikema Williams	Chair of the Democratic Party of Georgia, Georgia State Senator for Georgia's 39th state senate district and 2020 Democratic nominee for Georgia's 5th congressional district	Atlanta, Georgia		
Guam	Sarah Thomas-Nededog	Chair of the Democratic Party of Guam			
Hawaii	Dr. Amy Agbayani	Civil rights activist			
Idaho	Lauren McLean	Mayor of Boise	Boise, Idaho		
Illinois	Carol Moseley Braun	Former United States Senator from Illinois	Old State Capitol State Historic Site in Springfield, Illinois		
Indiana	Pete Buttigieg	Former mayor of South Bend	South Bend, Indiana		
Iowa	Tom Vilsack	Former United States Secretary of Agriculture and former governor of Iowa			
Kansas	Mark Pringle	Farmer			
Kentucky	Colmon Elridge	Education advocate			
Louisiana	Cedric Richmond	United States Representative from Louisiana	New Orleans, Louisiana		
Louisiana	LaToya Cantrell	Mayor of New Orleans	New Orleans, Louisiana		
Maine	Craig Hickman	Maine State Representative from Maine's 82nd state house district	Winthrop, Maine		
Maryland	Brandon Scott	President of the Baltimore City Council	Frederick Douglass-Isaac Myers Maritime Park in Baltimore, Maryland		
Maryland	Bianca Shah	College student	Frederick Douglass-Isaac Myers Maritime Park in Baltimore, Maryland		
Massachusetts	Claire D. Cronin	Massachusetts State Representative from the Massachusetts House of Representatives' 11th Plymouth district			
Michigan	Gary Peters	United States senator from Michigan	Detroit, Michigan		
Michigan	Ray Curry	UAW auto worker	Detroit, Michigan		
Minnesota	Amy Klobuchar	United States senator from Minnesota	Minneapolis, Minnesota		
Minnesota	Melvin Carter	Mayor of St. Paul	St. Paul, Minnesota		
Mississippi	Dr. Carmen Walters	President of Tougaloo College			
Missouri	Reuben Gill	Bricklayer	St. Louis, Missouri		
Montana	Rachel Prevost	Recent college graduate			
Nebraska	Geraldine Waller	Meatpacking employee			
Nevada	Dina Titus	United States Representative from Nevada's 1st congressional district	Welcome to Fabulous Las Vegas sign in Paradise, Nevada		
New Hampshire	John Lynch	Former governor of New Hampshire			
New Jersey	Phil Murphy	Governor of New Jersey	Paramount Theatre in Asbury Park, New Jersey		
New Mexico	Derrick J. Lente	New Mexico State Representative from New Mexico's 65th state House district	Sandia Pueblo Reservation in New Mexico		
New York	Scheena Iyande Tannis	Registered nurse and member of 1199 SEIU		Lieutenant Governor of New York Kathy Hochul in attendance	
North Carolina	Cozzie Watkins	Democratic activist	Charlotte, North Carolina		
North Dakota	Cesar Alvarez	Mandan, Hidatsa, and Arikara Nation citizen and advocate			
Northern Mariana Islands	Nola Kileleman Hix	Chair of the Northern Mariana Islands Democratic Party			
Ohio	Tim Ryan	United States Representative from Ohio's 13th congressional district			
Ohio	Josh Abernathy	IBEW organizer			
Oklahoma	Alicia Andrews	Chair of the Oklahoma Democratic Party	Greenwood District in Tulsa, Oklahoma		
Oregon	Dr. Rosa Colquitt	Activist	We Choose Love memorial in Portland, Oregon		
Oregon	Travis Nelson	Registered Nurse	We Choose Love memorial in Portland, Oregon		
Pennsylvania	Bob Casey Jr.	United States senator from Pennsylvania	Childhood home of Joe Biden in Scranton, Pennsylvania		
Puerto Rico	Carmelo Ríos Santiago	Majority leader of the Puerto Rico Senate			
Rhode Island	Joseph McNamara	Chair of the Rhode Island Democratic Party and Rhode Island State Representative from Rhode Island's 19th state house district	Oakland Beach, Warwick	John Bordieri, a chef from Bristol, accompanied McNamara, holding a plate of fried calamari. His presence attracted much Internet chatter, as did McNamara's dubbing of Rhode Island as the "calamari comeback state".	
South Carolina	Jaime Harrison	U.S. Senate nominee and former chair of the South Carolina Democratic Party	South Carolina State University in Orangeburg, South Carolina		
South Dakota	Kellen Returns From Scout	Tribal activist of the Standing Rock Sioux Tribe	Black Hills in South Dakota		
Tennessee	Keely Sage	College student	Hermitage Hotel in Nashville, Tennessee	Hermitage Hotel was the location of the final ratification of the 19th Amendment (granting female suffrage) 100 years prior on August 18, 1920	
Texas	Veronica Escobar	United States Representative from Texas's 16th congressional district	El Paso, Texas		
Utah	Jenny Wilson	Mayor of Salt Lake County	Utah State Capitol in Salt Lake City, Utah		
Vermont	David Zuckerman	Lieutenant Governor of Vermont		Bernie Sanders and Jane Sanders in attendance	
Virgin Islands, U.S.	Cecil Benjamin	Chair of the Democratic Party of the Virgin Islands			
Virginia	Khizr Khan	Lawyer	Freedom of Speech Wall, Charlottesville, Virginia		
Washington	My-Linh Thai	Washington State Representative from Washington's 41st state house district	Kerry Park in Seattle, Washington		
West Virginia	Fred Albert	Educator and union organizer			
Wyoming	Dennis Shepard	Activists, parents of Matthew Shepard			
Wyoming	Judy Shepard	Activists, parents of Matthew Shepard			
Wisconsin	Mandela Barnes	Lieutenant governor of Wisconsin	Wisconsin Center in Milwaukee, Wisconsin		
Delaware	John Carney	Governor of Delaware	Joseph R. Biden, Jr., Railroad Station in Wilmington, Delaware		
Delaware	Tom Carper	United States senator from Delaware	Joseph R. Biden, Jr., Railroad Station in Wilmington, Delaware		

== See also ==
- Ceremonial roll call at the 2024 Democratic National Convention
