= Malikha Mallette =

American radio personality

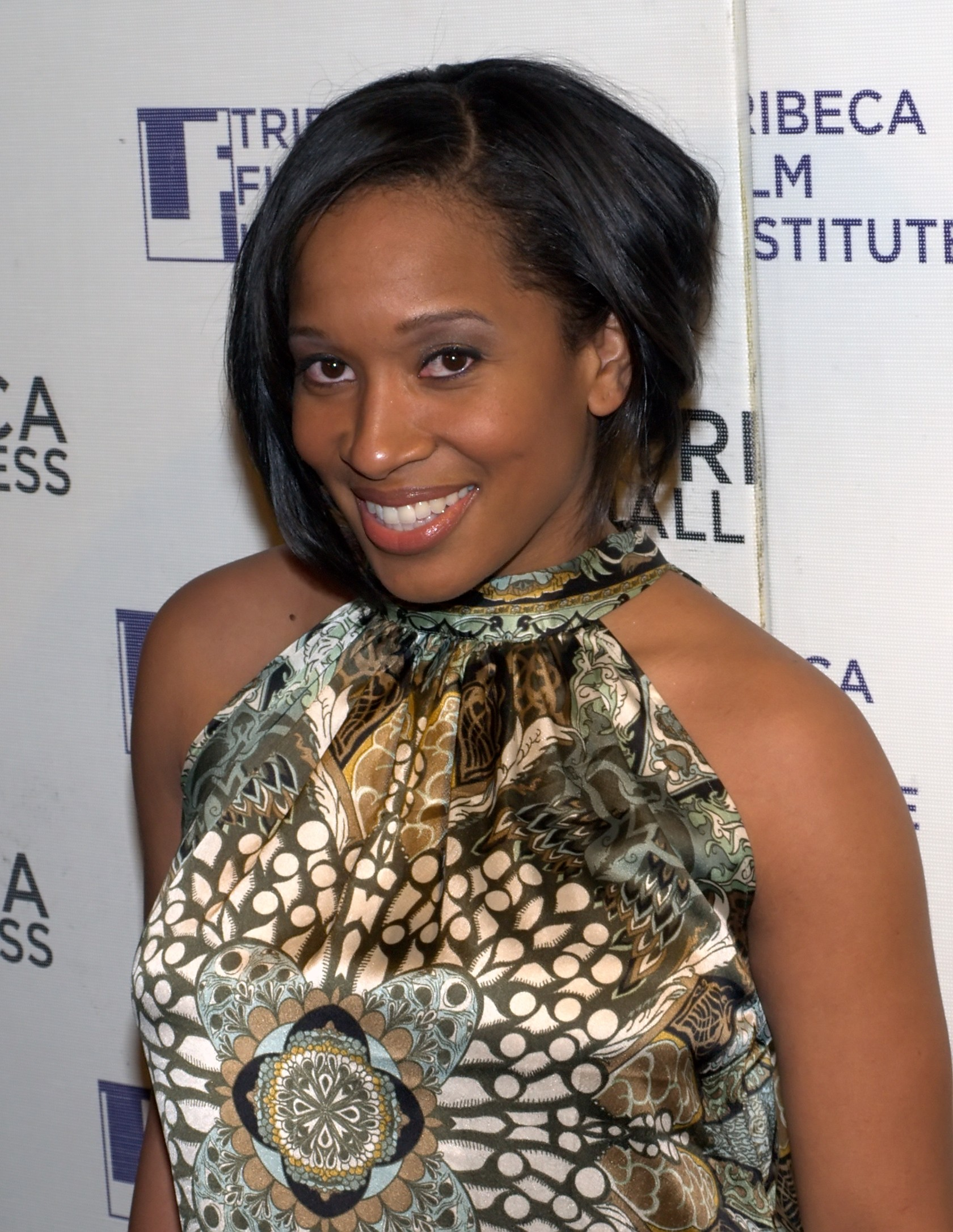
- Mallette at the 2010 Tribeca Film Festival.
- Presenting career
- Style: Radio presenter
- Country: United States
- Previous shows: The Morning Mess; The Ed Lover Show (co-host)

Malikha Mallette is an American former radio personality, voice-over artist and actress. She is most known for her former work at New York radio station Power 105, where she previously hosted afternoon drive.

Malikha's interest in radio came as a result of meeting with the program director of a radio station. Malikha started her career as a promotions intern at WVEE-FM, "V-103" in Atlanta, and within a few months, was hired for an on-air overnight shift. Mallette, a Queens native, earned the internship through her alma mater, Spelman College, where she eventually majored in English.

She soon moved from her overnight shift in Atlanta to middays at defunct radio station "X-1057" in Baltimore, MD. Malikha also worked on air very briefly at WPGC-FM in Washington D.C. before starting at Power 105 in 2003. She did the weekend overnight shifts and substituted for other weekday DJs. In August 2008, Mallette became the station's afternoon drive host of the Malikha Mallette Movement. After The Ed Lover morning show ended, Malikha got promoted to the morning show in December 2009, while the newly hired DJ Envy replaced her in the afternoons.

On December 6, 2010, Mallette moved back to the afternoons while DJ Envy, Angela Yee and Charlamagne Tha God began hosting the then new morning show on Power 105 as The Breakfast Club.

Malikha was the New York correspondent for British export, CD USA, a music series that only aired on DirecTV ’s channel 101. Her acting credits include playing a reporter on One Life to Live. She has a small part in the film Cadillac Records.

Mallette voiced a Djinn mother in the 2013 Blue Sky film Epic. She is also the narrator for Fatal Attraction on TV One.
