= Christale Spain =

American politician from South Carolina

Chair of the South Carolina Democratic Party
- Incumbent
- Assumed office April 29, 2023
- Preceded by: Trav Robertson

Personal details
- Born: 1976 or 1977 (age 49–50)
- Party: Democratic
- Education: University of South Carolina Aiken (BA); Columbia College (MA)

Christale Spain is an American political organizer. She has served as chair of the South Carolina Democratic Party since 2023, and is the first Black woman to hold the role.

== Education ==
Spain graduated from W. J. Keenan High School in Columbia, South Carolina. She then attended the University of South Carolina Aiken and played on the women's basketball team. Spain holds records for the most field goals, most field goals attempted, most rebounds, and highest rebounding average in the team's history.

She also attended Columbia College, and is a member of the Zeta Phi Beta sorority.

== Political career ==
Spain worked as political director for the Bernie Sanders 2016 presidential campaign and was state director for the Cory Booker 2020 presidential campaign. She also helped lead Black voter engagement during the 2022 midterms for the Democratic Party.

=== State party chair ===
Spain announced her campaign for state party chair in February 2023. Spain was endorsed by her predecessor Trav Robertson, as well as Jim Clyburn and Jaime Harrison. Her role meant overseeing the first scheduled Democratic Party presidential primary in South Carolina in February 2024.

In July 2024, Spain endorsed the Kamala Harris 2024 presidential campaign. She gave South Carolina's votes during the ceremonial roll call at the 2024 Democratic National Convention. Under Spain's leadership, the South Carolina Democratic Party put forth a candidate in elections for every constitutional office and House seat in 2026, following decades of gaps in various elections.

Spain was featured in the Root magazine 100 Class of 2026.

Party political offices
Preceded by Trav Robertson	Chair of the South Carolina Democratic Party; 2023–present	Incumbent
