= In the Bubble with Jaime =

2024 documentary film

- Directed by: Emily L. Harrold
- Produced by: Dara Canty, Executive Producer; Jedd Canty, Executive Producer; Charlamagne Tha God, Executive Producer; Karen Kinney, Executive Producer
- Edited by: Jan Kobal
- Release date: 1 February 2024 (United States)

In the Bubble with Jaime is a 2024 documentary film directed by Emily Harrold. It follows Jaime Harrison's campaign during his run for U.S. Senate against Lindsey Graham in South Carolina in 2020.

== Premise ==
In the Bubble with Jaime is set around the 2020 South Carolina Senate run of Democrat Jaime Harrison against Republican Lindsey Graham. Harrison raised more money during the campaign than any Senate candidate in the history of the state, gaining nationwide attention. The documentary shows footage of Harrison and his campaign and how they dealt with challenges such as dealing with the COVID pandemic and racism in the Southern United States.

== Release ==
Prior to its premier at the Montclair Film Festival in 2022, Charlamagne Tha God joined as an executive producer of the film. It was also shown at the RiverRun International Film Festival and the Beaufort International Film Festival where it was an official selection for the festival. It began a film tour in select theaters in South Carolina in November 2023 and was officially released on Local, USA through PBS in February 2024.

== Reception ==
The New Pittsburgh Courier called the film a "testament to the power of perseverance and the potential for change."
