= The Week in Jams =

- The opening logo of the series
- Starring: DJ Envy; Charlamagne Tha God; Sofi Green
- Country of origin: United States

Production
- Running time: Sundays 11AM-1PM and 11PM-1AM

Original release
- Network: MTV2
- Release: October 28, 2012 – May 26, 2013

Related
- Sucker Free

The Week in Jams (a re branded version of Sucker Free Countdown), was MTV2's sole hip-hop video block. It is a 2-hour top 15 countdown, airing on Sundays at 11AM ET/PT and 11PM ET/PT. Hosted by DJ Envy, Charlamagne Tha God, and Sofi Green. The series was canceled on May 26, 2013.

== History ==
On October 11, 2012, MTV announced they would expand and unify its hip hop music and lifestyle programming and content across all of its multiple channels and screens under the MTV Jams brand name. The move effectively extends the MTV Jams brand from a 24-hour digital channel to now touch all MTV properties. They also announced they would be relaunching the MTV2 music video countdown known as Sucker Free Countdown. Where “Sucker Free Countdown” focused primarily on music, “The Week in Jams” expanded focus includes the latest in the hip hop lifestyle, from music to fashion, gear to sports and, of course, real talk. Fans will discover new artists, hear the loudest opinions, keep up with new trends from all over the country and sit in on hard-hitting interviews.

MTV also recruited a hip hop dream team of contributors that would serve as the hosts of “The Week in Jams” and also provide expert commentary across all of MTV's channels and screens including: mixtape legend, radio personality and television host DJ Envy, industry insider, radio personality and cast member of “MTV2's Guy Code” Charlamagne Tha God, Motown Records recording artist and songwriter Sofi Green, West Coast mover and shaker Levi Maestro, and west coast radio personality and nationally syndicated nighttime radio host Nessa. They joined MTV's hip hop expert, Sway Calloway, a vanguard radio personality, record producer, hip-hop artist and MTV News Correspondent. The first episode premiered on October 28, 2012.
