= Angela Yee =

American radio personality (born 1976)

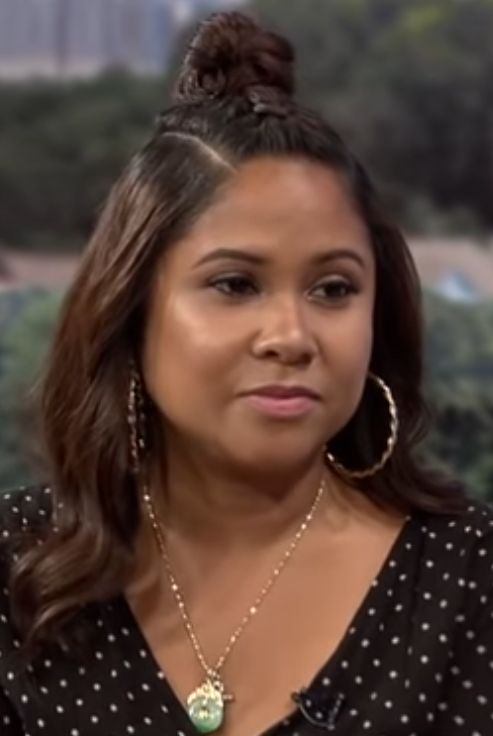
- Yee in 2018
- Born: January 3, 1976 (age 50); Brooklyn, New York City, U.S.
- Education: Wesleyan University
- Presenting career
- Show: Way Up with Angela Yee (Host)
- Station: Power 105.1
- Time slot: 10:00 a.m. – 2:00 p.m.
- Style: Radio presenter
- Country: United States
- Previous shows: The Morning After; Lip Service; The Breakfast Club
- Website: www.teamyee.tv

Angela Yee (born January 3, 1976) is an American radio personality. She is currently the host of syndicated radio show Way Up. She previously co-hosted the radio show The Breakfast Club from 2010 to 2022. She is also on the Board of Governors of the We Are Family Foundation and a board member of the American Foundation for the University of the West Indies. She is also the first-ever ambassador for the New York Public Library system. Since 2019, she has served as the BSE Global Diversity, Inclusion, and Community Engagement Ambassador.

== Early life and education ==
Angela Yee was born to a Chinese father and an Afro-Montserratian mother and raised in Flatbush, Brooklyn, in New York City. She attended Poly Prep in New York, entering through Prep for Prep. When her family moved to South Orange, New Jersey, Yee transferred to Columbia High School. For her collegiate career, she attended Wesleyan University, majoring in English and graduating in 1997. She pursued employment in marketing and music after completing her studies.

== Career ==
=== Early career ===
Yee garnered an internship with Wu-Tang Management to assist the CEO, Divine. Yee was lip-syncing the intro on the Wu-Tang Clan's “Reunited” music video. She also wrote all the skits on GZA's third studio album Beneath the Surface.

She then worked for Paul Rosenberg and Eminem's clothing company Shady Limited and saw an opportunity at Sirius Satellite Radio's marketing department. She asked Rosenberg if he could get her an interview because he had the connections through Shade 45. Rosenberg then said to her, "Well, you know what, they're looking for a female on the morning show, why don't you try it out and see if it works for you?"

=== Radio ===
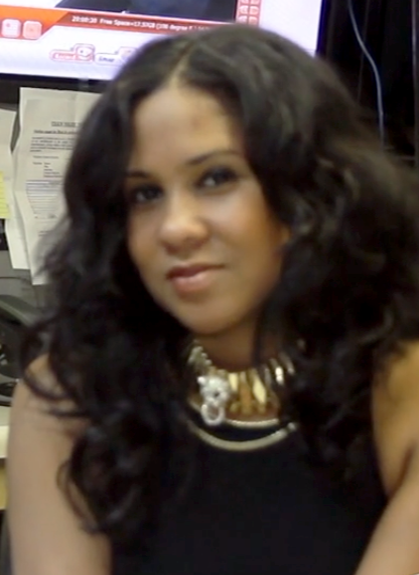
Yee in 2013

She hosted Lip Service and The Morning After with Angela Yee on Eminem's radio station, Shade 45, at Sirius Satellite Radio. She started her radio career at Sirius in 2005 as the co-host for The Cipha Sounds Effect. When Cipha Sounds left Sirius in July 2008, Yee took over the hosting duties full-time and the show was renamed the Shade 45 Morning Show Starring Angela Yee, and finally the name changed to The Morning After with Angela Yee.

In December 2010, Yee left Shade 45 and began hosting The Breakfast Club on Power 105.1, alongside DJ Envy and Charlamagne tha God. The show is known for being candid and asking tough questions to artists.

Weekends with the Breakfast Club launched in March 2013 and was nationally syndicated in over 50 markets.

In 2019, Yee was bestowed with the Gracie Award, a national radio honor from the Alliance for Women in Media, for her work on The Breakfast Club.

In August 2020, Yee and her Breakfast Club co-hosts, DJ Envy and Charlamagne Tha God, were inducted into the Radio Hall of Fame. She left the show on December 1, 2022, to host her own nationally syndicated radio show Way Up. Way Up With Angela Yee began airing on February 6, 2023.

=== Television ===
Yee worked as a correspondent for MTV2's Sucker Free. She was a featured cast member on the 2013 VH1 reality show The Gossip Game. The show spotlighted seven New York women in the radio and blogging industry. The Breakfast Club show debuted on Revolt on March 31, 2014. On March 21, 2020, Yee was featured on BET's Being series in the episode titled "Being: Angela Yee", a look into her daily life.

=== Other endeavors ===
Yee managed recording artists GZA, Jay Electronica, and most notably, 360, who propelled her management skills to the spotlight. She helped facilitate Jay Electronica's deal with Jay Z's Roc Nation. In 2016, Yee opened the fourth branch of her juice bar chain, Juices for Life, in Bedford-Stuyvesant, around the corner from her home. Her business partners are DJ Envy, one of her two co-hosts on The Breakfast Club, and Styles P. In 2017, Yee partnered with Simon and Schuster/Atria Books to start a book club, called Kickin' It From the Stoop, to promote reading and literature. In 2018, Yee became the first-ever ambassador for the New York Public Library system. In January 2020, Yee hosted the Giving Gracefully Awards, an awards night that honors philanthropy among Olympic athletes and public figures.

== Philanthropy ==
Yee is involved with a variety of philanthropic efforts. Beginning in 2013, Yee became involved with Dress for Success, an organization that provides disadvantaged women with professional attire as well as career development skills and support. Also in 2013, Yee posed for a breast cancer awareness campaign created by the organization Hairless 4 Her Awareness. In 2013, Yee became involved with Coats for Kids, an organization dedicated to bringing winter coats to children in need. In 2015, Yee hosted the 33rd Annual Coat for Kids Fundraiser and in subsequent years was present to hand-deliver coats and take photos with children and their families. Additionally in 2015, Yee served as host of the second annual Children Making Strides Against Childhood Cancer event. In December 2018, she teamed up with the National Black Justice Coalition to bring awareness to World AIDS Day. Also in 2018, Yee began hosting Run With Yee, a monthly 5K run in New York's Prospect Park, with the goal of promoting healthy lifestyles.

In June 2022, Yee founded her own non-profit organization, Well Road, which is primarily focused on wellness and literacy.

== Awards and honors ==
- MIW Airblazer Award (2020)
- Gracie Award (2020)
- Gracie Award (2019)
- Vice Chancellor's Achievement Award, bestowed by the American Foundation for the University of West Indies (AFUWI)
- In 2018, New York City mayor Bill de Blasio declared August 28 as Angela Yee Day.
- In 2018, the New York Public Library named Yee as their first-ever ambassador.
- WEEN Mission Award (2014)
- Shirley Chisolm Woman of Distinction Award

== See also ==
- Chinese Americans in New York City
