= Schedule of the 2024 Democratic National Convention =

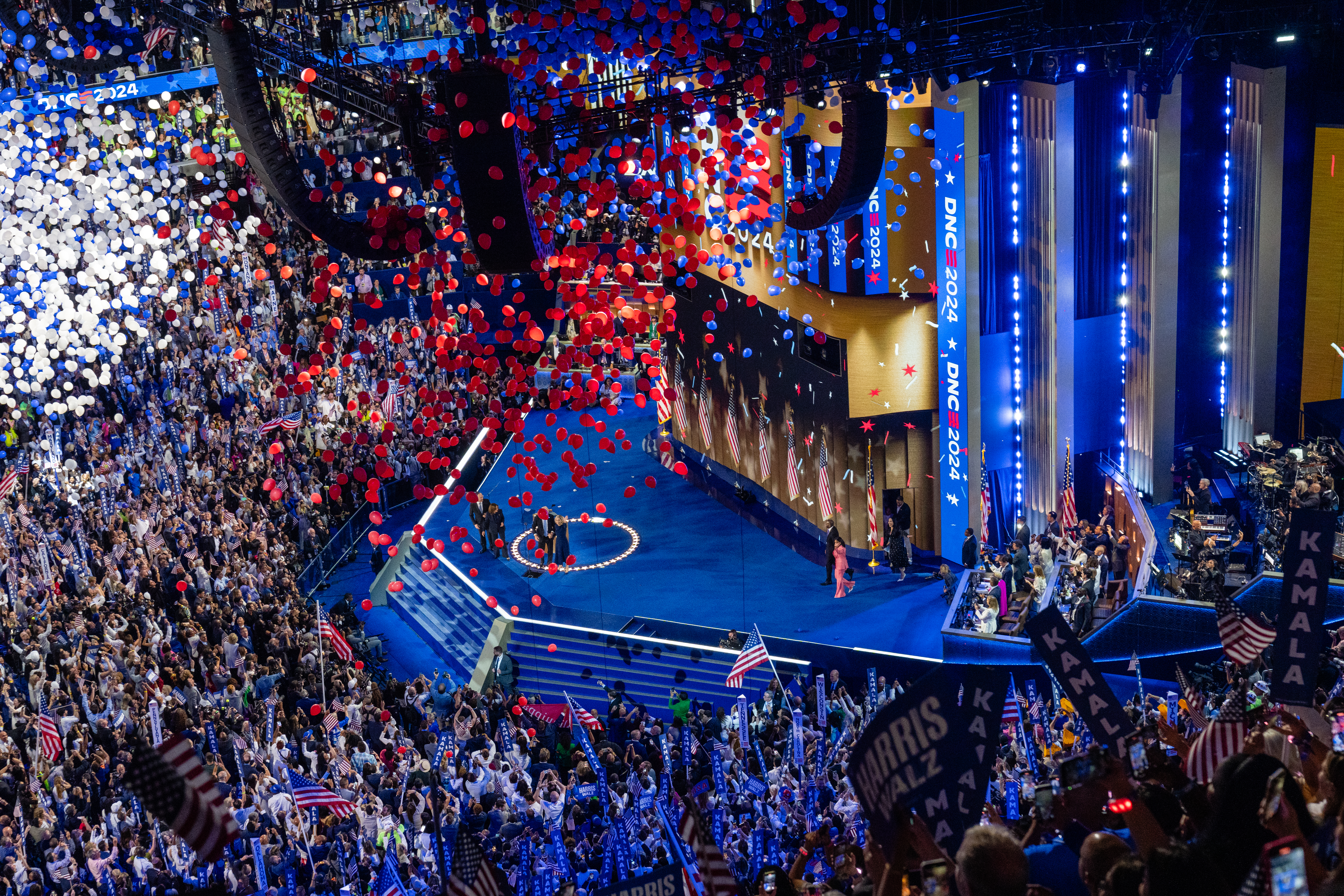
Closing balloon drop at the end of the convention

The 2024 Democratic National Convention was held August 17–20, 2024, in Chicago. The convention's evening general sessions were held at the United Center. Similarly to the 2020 Democratic National Convention, each evening's program featured a celebrity host.

== First night (Monday, August 19: For the People) ==
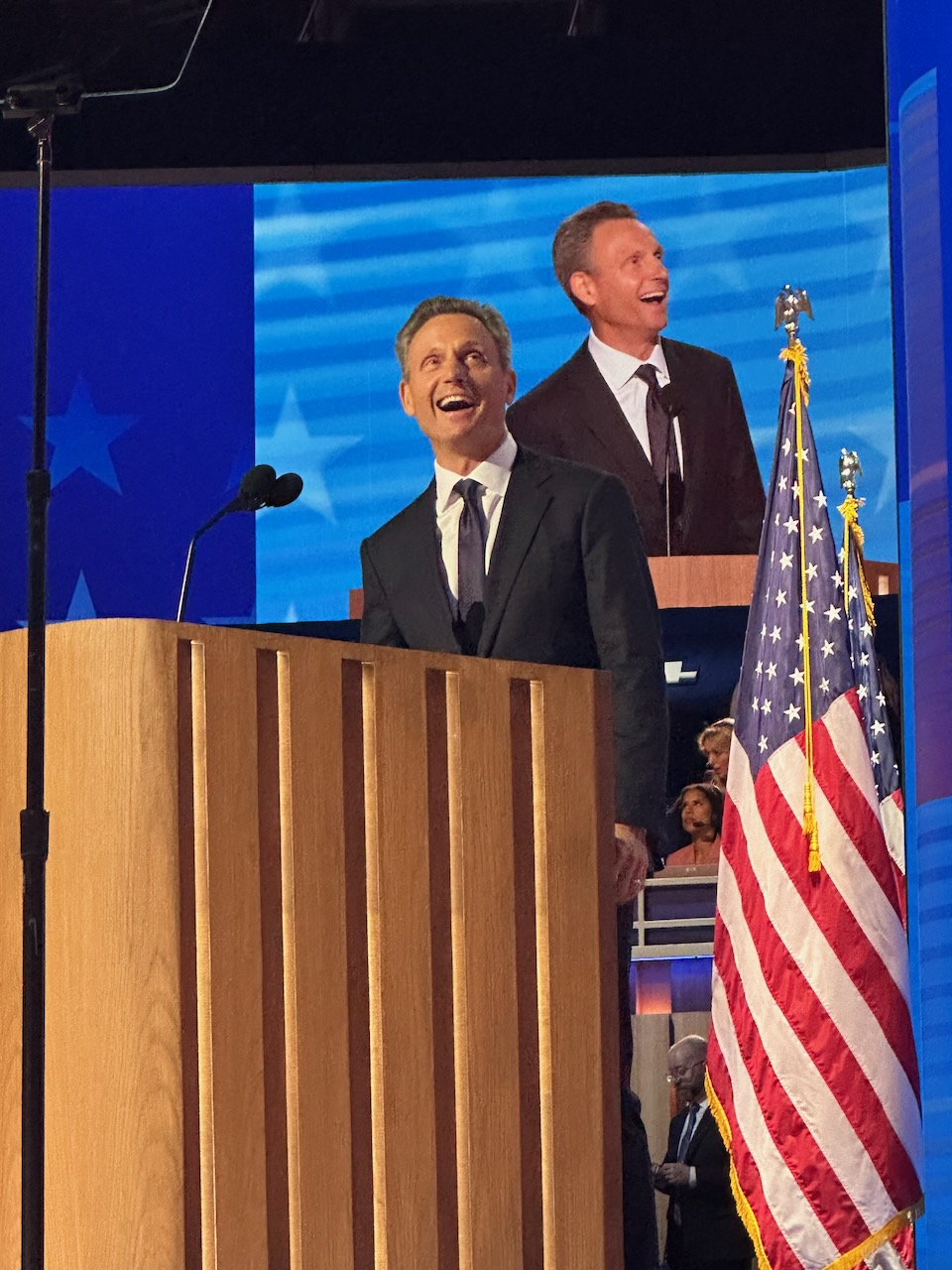
Actor Tony Goldwyn emceed Night 1 of the 2024 Democratic National Convention

The first night was emceed by actor and director Tony Goldwyn and included musical performances by Mickey Guyton and Jason Isbell. It included tributes to president Joe Biden, who delivered Monday's closing address. Alexandria Ocasio-Cortez, 2016 Democratic presidential nominee Hillary Clinton, and first lady Jill Biden and daughter Ashley spoke. Harris made a brief surprise appearance on-stage to pay tribute to Biden and welcome the attendees. The party platform, drafted by delegates in the Platform Committee, was adopted by the full body of delegates by voice vote.

Main programming began at 5:30 PM Central. Listed below are select speakers in order of appearance.

=== Speech schedule of first night ===
Call to order
Minyon Moore	Permanent Chair of the Democratic National Convention
Jaime Harrison	Chair of the Democratic National Committee (2021–2025)
Remarks
Brandon Johnson	Mayor of Chicago (2023–present)
Jaime Harrison	Chair of the Democratic National Committee (2021–2025)
Peggy Flanagan	Lieutenant Governor of Minnesota (2019–present)
Maxine Waters	U.S. Representative from CA-43 (1991–present)
Derrick Johnson	President and CEO of the NAACP
Melanie L. Campbell	President and CEO of the National Coalition on Black Civic Participation
Credentials committee
Marcia Fudge	Co-Chair of the Democratic National Committee Credentials Committee; 18th United States Secretary of Housing and Urban Development (2021–2024); Member of the U.S. House of Representatives from Ohio's 11th district (2008–2021)
James Roosevelt	Co-Chair of the Democratic National Committee Credentials Committee; Grandson of President Franklin D. Roosevelt
Rules and bylaws committee
Leah D. Daughtry	Co-Chair of the Democratic National Committee Rules and Bylaws Committee
Platform committee
Mitch Landrieu	Co-Chair of the Democratic National Committee Platform Committee; 61st Mayor of New Orleans (2010–2018); 51st Lieutenant Governor of Louisiana (2004–2010)
Regina Romero	Co-Chair of the Democratic National Committee Platform Committee; 42nd Mayor of Tucson (2019–present)
Remarks
Lauren Underwood	U.S. Representative from IL-14 (2019–present)
Robert Garcia	U.S. Representative from CA-42 (2023–present)
Brian Wallach and Sandra Abrevaya	Co-founders of I AM ALS
Dick Durbin	U.S. Senator from Illinois (1997–present); Senate Majority Whip
Joyce Beatty	U.S. Representative from OH-03 (2013–present)
Lee Saunders	President of the American Federation of State, County and Municipal Employees (AFSCME)
April Verrett	President of the Service Employees International Union (SEIU)
Brent Booker	General President of the Laborers' International Union of North America (LIUNA)
Kenneth W. Cooper	International President of the International Brotherhood of Electrical Workers (IBEW)
Claude Cummings Jr.	President of the Communication Workers of America (CWA)
Liz Shuler	President of the AFL-CIO
Karen Bass	Mayor of Los Angeles (2022–present); Member of the U.S. House of Representatives (2011–2022); Speaker of the California State Assembly (2008–2010)
Mickey Guyton performs her song "All American"
Austin Davis	Lieutenant Governor of Pennsylvania (2023–present)
Sara Rodriguez	46th Lieutenant Governor of Wisconsin (2023–present)
Lina Hidalgo	County Judge of Harris County, Texas (2019–present)
Eleni Kounalakis	Lieutenant Governor of California (2019–present)
Mallory McMorrow	Member of the Michigan Senate (2019–present) and Majority Whip
Laphonza Butler	U.S. Senator from California (2023–2024)
Jason Isbell performs his song "Something More Than Free"
Gina Raimondo	United States Secretary of Commerce (2021–2025); Governor of Rhode Island (2015–2021) (Note: Raimondo spoke at the convention in her personal capacity, and was recognized as the Former Governor of Rhode Island, to avoid conflict with the Hatch Act.)
Kathy Hochul	Governor of New York (2021–present)
Primetime
Kamala Harris	Nominee for president Vice President of the United States (2021–2025); Surprise appearance
Tony Goldwyn	Actor and director
Steve Kerr	Head coach of the Golden State Warriors (2014–present) and the 2024 United States men's Olympic basketball team
Shawn Fain	President of the United Automobile Workers (2023–present)
Alexandria Ocasio-Cortez	U.S. Representative from NY-14 (2019–present)
Hillary Clinton	First Lady of the United States (1993–2001); U.S. Senator from New York (2001–2009); U.S. Secretary of State (2009–2013); 2016 Democratic nominee for president
Jim Clyburn	U.S. Representative from SC-06 (1993–present); Former House Majority Whip
Jamie Raskin	U.S. Representative from MD-08 (2017–present)
Jasmine Crockett	U.S. Representative from TX-30 (2023–present)
Andy Beshear	Governor of Kentucky (2019–present)
Raphael Warnock	U.S. Senator from Georgia (2021–present)
Chris Coons	U.S. Senator from Delaware (2010–present)
Jill Biden	First Lady of the United States (2021–2025)
Ashley Biden	Social worker, fashion designer, and daughter of President Joe Biden
Joe Biden	46th President of the United States (2021–2025)

== Second night (Tuesday, August 20: A Bold Vision for America's Future) ==
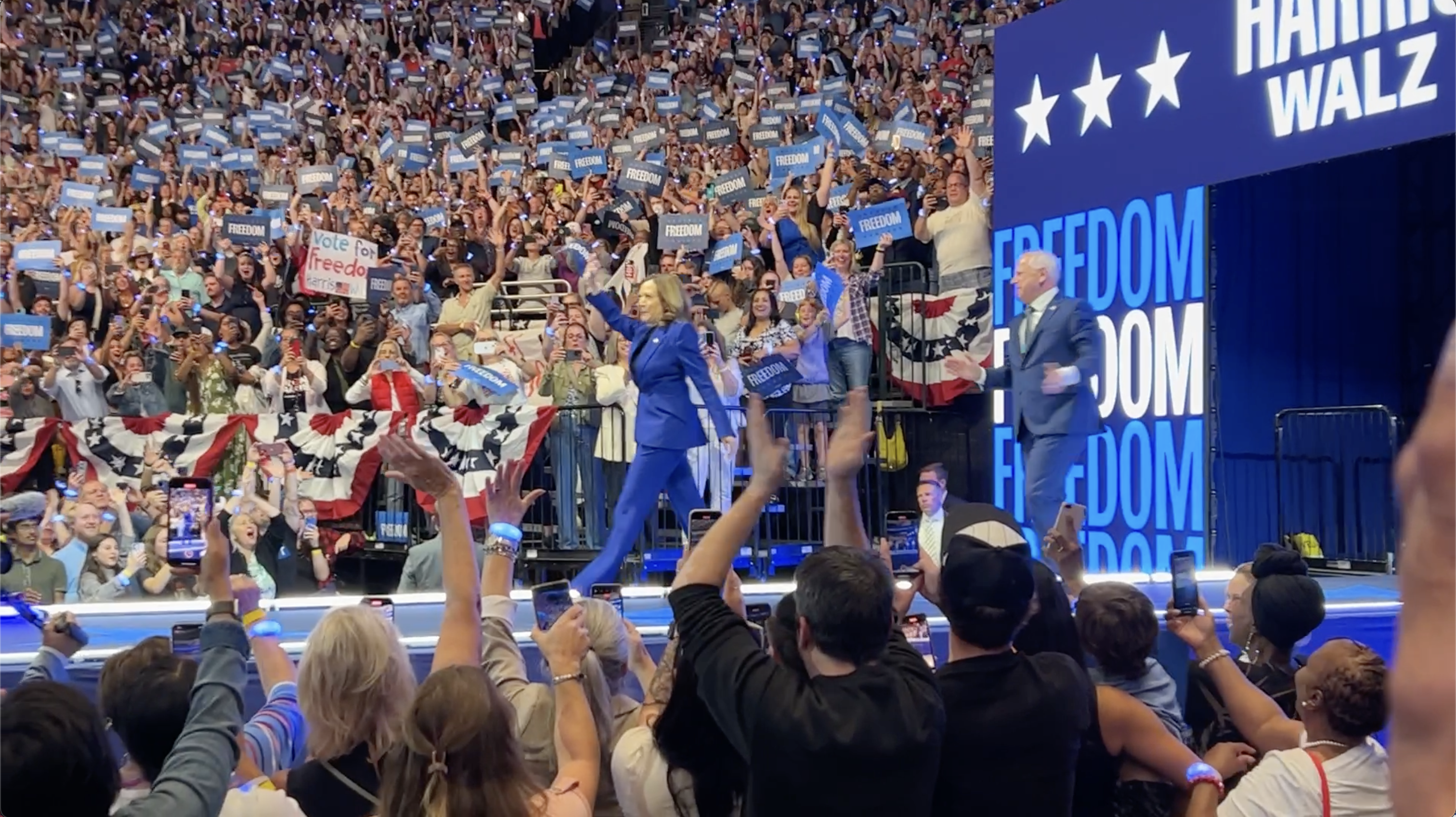
Harris and Walz entering the stage together during at the Fiserv Forum during their rally in Milwaukee, Wisconsin, on the second night of the convention

The second night was emceed by television commentator and political strategist Ana Navarro (a Republican Harris supporter), and included performances by Patti LaBelle and Common. Former first lady Michelle Obama and former president Barack Obama, who gave the closing addresses, and second gentleman Doug Emhoff were among those that spoke. Jason Carter, grandson of former U.S. President Jimmy Carter, also gave a speech on this night and honored his grandfather. Another presidential grandson, John F. Kennedy’s grandson Jack Schlossberg, spoke as well.

Described as a "celebratory roll call" or ceremonial roll call, delegates ceremonially reported voting results for the presidential nomination hosted by Secretary of the DNC, Jason Rae. Led by DJ Cassidy, each state's delegation was accompanied by their choice of background music during the roll call of the states, largely consisting of songs from artists from each respective state. The atmosphere of the roll call was likened by many outlets to a dance party, and seen as more exciting than conventional roll calls seen at most previous conventions.

Amid the nomination vote, Harris and Walz addressed a campaign rally gathered at the Fiserv Forum in Milwaukee that was attended by 15,000 spectators. A portion of Harris' remarks there were telecast live to the United Center following the conclusion of the roll call. The Fiserv Forum is approximately 80 miles (130 km) from the United Center, and had weeks earlier been the main venue of the 2024 Republican National Convention.

=== Speech schedule of second night ===
Speaker	Position/Notability	Ref.
Call to order
Jaime Harrison	Chair of the Democratic National Committee (2021–2025)	
Mitch Landrieu	Co-chair of the Democratic National Committee Platform Committee; 61st Mayor of New Orleans (2010–2018); 51st Lieutenant Governor of Louisiana (2004–2010)	
Remarks
Jason Carter	Former member of the Georgia State Senate (2010–2015); Grandson of former U.S. President Jimmy Carter Former Democratic nominee in the 2014 Georgia gubernatorial election	
Jack Schlossberg	Grandson of former U.S. President John F. Kennedy	
Malcolm Kenyatta	Member of the Pennsylvania House of Representatives (2019–present)	
Stephanie Grisham	White House Press Secretary (2019–2020, Republican)	
Nabela Noor	Content creator	
Gary Peters	U.S. Senator from Michigan (2015–present)	
Primetime
Kamala Harris (remarks delivered remotely from Fiserv Forum)	Presidential nominee	
Ana Navarro	Political strategist and commentator (Republican); Host	
Chuck Schumer	Senate Majority Leader (2021–present); Senate Minority Leader (2017–2021); U.S. Senator from New York (1999–present)	
Bernie Sanders	U.S. Senator from Vermont (2007–present, Independent)	
J. B. Pritzker	Governor of Illinois (2019–present)	
Kenneth Chenault	Former CEO of American Express (2001–2018)	
Michelle Lujan Grisham	Governor of New Mexico (2019–present)	
Angela Alsobrooks	Prince George's County Executive (2018–2024); Democratic nominee in the 2024 United States Senate election in Maryland	
John Giles	Mayor of Mesa, Arizona (2014–present, Republican)	
Tammy Duckworth	U.S. Senator from Illinois (2017–present)	
Doug Emhoff	Second Gentleman of the United States (2021–2025) speech by spouse of the presidential nominee	
Michelle Obama	First Lady of the United States (2009–2017)	
Barack Obama	44th President of the United States (2009–2017)	

=== Ceremonial roll call ===
Ceremonial roll call results, walk-on song choice, and notable roll call speaker(s)
State	Song choice	Notable speaker(s)	Cast votes		
State	Song choice	Notable speaker(s)	Kamala Harris	Present	Absent
Alabama (Note: Alabama passed its turn to Delaware so the latter could vote first as Joe Biden's home state.)	"Sweet Home Alabama" – Lynyrd Skynyrd		56	0	0
Alaska	"Feel It Still" – Portugal. The Man		19	0	0
American Samoa	"Edge of Glory" – Lady Gaga		10	0	0
Arizona	"Edge of Seventeen" – Stevie Nicks		85	0	0
Arkansas	"Don't Stop" – Fleetwood Mac	Lottie Shackelford, Mayor of Little Rock, Arkansas (1987–1988)	36	0	0
California (Note: California passed its turn so it could vote last as Kamala Harris's home state.)	"The Next Episode" – Dr. Dre ft. Snoop Dogg "California Love" – 2Pac ft. Dr. Dre "Alright" and "Not Like Us" – Kendrick Lamar	Gavin Newsom, Governor of California (2019–present)	482	0	0
Colorado	"September" – Earth, Wind & Fire		86	0	0
Connecticut	"Signed, Sealed, Delivered I'm Yours" – Stevie Wonder	Ned Lamont, Governor of Connecticut (2019–present); Jahana Hayes, U.S. Representative from CT-05 (2019–present)	73	1	0
Delaware	"Higher Love" – Whitney Houston and Kygo	Chris Coons, U.S. Senator from Delaware (2010–present); Lisa Blunt Rochester, U.S. Representative from DE-AL (2017–2025)	34	0	0
Democrats Abroad	"Love Train" – The O'Jays	Martha McDevitt-Pugh, Chair of Democrats Abroad (2023–present)	21	0	0
District of Columbia	"Let Me Clear My Throat" – DJ Kool	Muriel Bowser, Mayor of the District of Columbia (2015–present)	49	0	0
Florida	"I Won't Back Down" – Tom Petty	Nikki Fried, chair of the Florida Democratic Party (2023–present)	243	4	0
Georgia	"Welcome to Atlanta" — Jermaine Dupri ft. Ludacris "Turn Down for What" and "Get Low" – Lil Jon (cameo appearance)	Nikema Williams, U.S. Representative from GA-05 (2021–present) and chair of the Democratic Party of Georgia	123	0	0
Guam	"Espresso" – Sabrina Carpenter	Lou Leon Guerrero, Governor of Guam (2019–present)	12	0	0
Hawaii	"24K Magic" – Bruno Mars	Josh Green, Governor of Hawaii (2022–present)	23	6	0
Idaho	"Private Idaho" – The B-52s	Lauren Necochea, chair of the Idaho Democratic Party (2022–present)	27	0	0
Illinois	"Sirius" – The Alan Parsons Project	Elizabeth Hernandez, chair of the Democratic Party of Illinois (2022–present); J. B. Pritzker, Governor of Illinois (2019–present)	176	1	0
Indiana	"Don't Stop 'Til You Get Enough" – Michael Jackson	Sean Astin, actor André Carson, U.S. Representative from IN-07 (2008–present)	86	0	0
Iowa	"Celebration" – Kool & the Gang	Rita Hart, Chair of the Iowa Democratic Party	45	0	1
Kansas	"Carry On Wayward Son" – Kansas	Jeanna Repass, chair of the Kansas Democratic Party	39	0	0
Kentucky	"First Class" – Jack Harlow	Andy Beshear, Governor of Kentucky (2019–present)	56	0	0
Louisiana	"All I Do Is Win" – DJ Khaled	Wendell Pierce, actor Troy Carter, U.S. Representative from LA-02 (2021–present); Randal Gaines, chair of the Louisiana Democratic Party (2024–present)	47	1	0
Maine	"Shut Up and Dance" – Walk the Moon	Janet Mills, Governor of Maine (2019–present)	30	0	0
Maryland	"Respect" – Aretha Franklin	Wes Moore, Governor of Maryland (2023–present)	118	0	0
Massachusetts	"I'm Shipping Up to Boston" – Dropkick Murphys	Steve Kerrigan, chair of the Massachusetts Democratic Party (2023–present)	116	0	0
Michigan	"Lose Yourself" – Eminem	Debbie Stabenow, U.S. Senator from Michigan (2001–2025); Gretchen Whitmer, Governor of Michigan (2019–present); Lavora Barnes, chair of the Michigan Democratic Party (2019–present)	125	3	0
Minnesota (Note: Minnesota passed its turn so it could vote second to last as Tim Walz's home state.)	"Kiss" and "1999" – Prince	Amy Klobuchar, U.S. Senator from Minnesota (2007–present); Tina Smith, U.S. Senator from Minnesota (2018–present)	81	10	0
Mississippi	"Twistin' the Night Away" – Sam Cooke	Cheikh Taylor, chair of the Mississippi Democratic Party (2023–present)	40	0	0
Missouri	"Good Luck, Babe!" – Chappell Roan	Russ Carnahan, chair of the Missouri Democratic Party (2023–present)	68	2	0
Montana	"American Woman" – Lenny Kravitz	Former Montana Senate Minority Leader Jon Sesso and Robyn Driscoll, chair of the Montana Democratic Party	24	0	0
Nebraska	"Firework" – Katy Perry	Leirion Gaylor Baird, mayor of Lincoln, Jane Kleeb, chair of the Nebraska Democratic Party and others	34	0	0
Nevada	"Mr. Brightside" – The Killers	Daniele Monroe-Moreno, chair of the Nevada Democratic Party (2023–present)	48	0	0
New Hampshire	"Don't Stop Believin'" – Journey		34	0	0
New Jersey	"Born in the U.S.A." – Bruce Springsteen	Phil Murphy, Governor of New Jersey (2018–present); Joeigh Perella, transgender advocate LeRoy J. Jones Jr., chair of the New Jersey Democratic State Committee (2021–present)	142	2	0
New Mexico	"Confident" – Demi Lovato	Jessica Velasquez, chair of the Democratic Party of New Mexico (2021–present)	45	0	0
New York	"Empire State of Mind" – Jay-Z ft. Alicia Keys	Henry Garrido, executive director of District Council 37; Kathy Hochul, Governor of New York (2021–present)	298	0	0
North Carolina	"Raise Up" – Petey Pablo	Anderson Clayton, chair of the North Carolina Democratic Party (2023–present)	131	0	0
North Dakota	"Girl on Fire" – Alicia Keys		17	0	0
Northern Mariana Islands	"Ain't No Mountain High Enough" – Marvin Gaye & Tammi Terrell		11	0	0
Ohio	"Green Light" – John Legend	Elizabeth Walters, chair of the Ohio Democratic Party (2021–present)	142	1	0
Oklahoma	"Ain't Goin' Down ('Til the Sun Comes Up)" – Garth Brooks	Alicia Andrews, chair of the Oklahoma Democratic Party (2019–present)	36	0	0
Oregon	"Float On" – Modest Mouse	Ron Wyden, U.S. Senator from Oregon (1996–present); Jeff Merkley, U.S. Senator from Oregon (2009–present)	78	0	0
Pennsylvania	"Black and Yellow" – Wiz Khalifa "Motownphilly" – Boyz II Men	Josh Shapiro, Governor of Pennsylvania (2023–present); Dwan Walker, Mayor of Aliquippa, Pennsylvania	178	0	0
Puerto Rico	"Despacito" – Luis Fonsi ft. Daddy Yankee		60	0	0
Rhode Island	"Shake It Off" – Taylor Swift	Joe Shekarchi, Speaker of the Rhode Island House of Representatives (2021–present)	34	1	0
South Carolina	"Get Up (I Feel Like Being a) Sex Machine" – James Brown	Christale Spain, chair of the South Carolina Democratic Party (2023–present)	65	0	0
South Dakota	"What I Like About You" – The Romantics	Chante Reddest, activist Shane Merrill, chair of the South Dakota Democratic Party	20	0	0
Tennessee	"9 to 5" – Dolly Parton	Justin J. Pearson, member of the Tennessee House of Representatives (2023–present); Hendrell Remus, chair of the Tennessee Democratic Party (2021–2025)	72	0	0
Texas	"Texas Hold 'Em" – Beyonce	Eva Longoria, actor Cecile Richards, former president of Planned Parenthood & daughter of former Texas Governor Ann Richards; Kate Cox, plaintiff in Cox v. Texas; Gilberto Hinojosa, chair of the Texas Democratic Party (2012–present)	263	3	0
Utah	"Animal" – Neon Trees	Diane Lewis, chair of the Utah Democratic Party (2021–present)	34	0	0
Vermont	"Stick Season" – Noah Kahan	David Glidden, chair of the Vermont Democratic Party (2023–2025)	24	0	0
Virgin Islands	"VI to the Bone" – Mic Love		13	0	0
Virginia	"The Way I Are" – Timbaland	Bobby Scott, U.S. Representative from VA-03 (1993–present); Mark Warner, U.S. Senator from Virginia (2009–present)	119	0	0
Washington	"Can't Hold Us" – Macklemore & Ryan Lewis ft. Ray Dalton		101	9	0
West Virginia	"Take Me Home, Country Roads" – John Denver		24	0	0
Wisconsin	"Jump Around" – House of Pain	Tony Evers, Governor of Wisconsin (2019–present)	94	1	0
Wyoming	"I Gotta Feeling" – Black Eyed Peas	Joe Barbuto, chair of the Wyoming Democratic Party (2017–present)	17	0	0
			Totals		
			4,564	45	1

== Third night (Wednesday, August 21: A Fight for Our Freedoms) ==
The third night was emceed by actress Mindy Kaling, featuring performances by Stevie Wonder, John Legend, Sheila E and Maren Morris. Vice presidential nominee Minnesota Governor Tim Walz delivered his acceptance speech. Pete Buttigieg also spoke.

The evening was headlined by Walz and Clinton.

=== Speech schedule of third night ===
Speaker	Position/Notability	Ref
Cory Booker	U.S. Senator from New Jersey (2013–present)	
Mini Timmaraju	President and CEO of Reproductive Freedom for All (2021–present)	
Alexis McGill Johnson	CEO of Planned Parenthood (2019–present)	
Cecile Richards	Former CEO of Planned Parenthood (2006–2018) and daughter of former Texas governor Ann Richards	
Kelley Robinson	President of the Human Rights Campaign (2022–present)	
Jessica Mackler	President of EMILY's List (2023–present)	
María Teresa Kumar	President and CEO of Voto Latino	
Tom Suozzi	U.S. Representative from NY-03 (2017–2023, 2024–present)	
Aftab Pureval	Mayor of Cincinnati, Ohio (2022–present)	
Cavalier Johnson	Mayor of Milwaukee, Wisconsin (2021–present)	
Lisa Blunt Rochester	U.S. Representative from DE-AL (2017–2025); Democratic nominee in the 2024 United States Senate election in Delaware	
Grace Meng	U.S Representative from NY-06 (2013–present)	
Jared Polis	Governor of Colorado (2019–present)	
Debbie Wasserman Schultz	U.S. Representative from FL-25 (2005–present); Former Chair of the Democratic National Committee	
Suzan DelBene	U.S. Representative from WA-01 (2012–present); Chair of the Democratic Congressional Campaign Committee	
Keith Ellison	Attorney General of Minnesota (2019–present)	
Dana Nessel	Attorney General of Michigan (2019–present)	
Rachel Goldberg and Jon Polin	Parents of Hersh Goldberg-Polin, an Israeli-American taken hostage by Hamas on October 7, 2023	
Veronica Escobar	U.S. Representative from TX-16 (2019–present)	
Chris Murphy	U.S. Senator from Connecticut (2013–present)	
Javier Salazar	Bexar County Sheriff (2017–present)	
Pete Aguilar	Chair of the House Democratic Caucus (2023–present); U.S. Representative from CA-33 (2015–present)	
Carlos Eduardo Espina	Immigration activist and content creator	
Olivia Troye	Trump administration official (Republican)	
Geoff Duncan	Former Lieutenant Governor of Georgia (2019–2023; Republican)	
Bennie Thompson	U.S. Representative from MS-02 (1993–present)	
Aquilino Gonell	Former U.S. Capitol Police officer	
Andy Kim	U.S. Representative from NJ-03 (2019–2025); Democratic nominee in the 2024 United States Senate election in New Jersey	
Olivia Julianna	Activist	
Stevie Wonder	Musician	
Kenan Thompson	Comedian	
Primetime
Mindy Kaling	Actress, writer, comedian Host	
Hakeem Jeffries	House Minority Leader (2023–present); U.S. Representative from NY-08 (2013–present)	
Bill Clinton	42nd President of the United States (1993–2001)	
Nancy Pelosi	Speaker of the U.S. House of Representatives (2007–2011; 2019–2023); U.S. Representative from CA-11 (1987–present)	
Lateefah Simon	Member of the San Francisco BART Board of Directors (2016–present); Democratic nominee in the 2024 United States House of Representatives election in CA-12	
Tony West	Former U.S. Associate Attorney General (2012–2014); Brother-in-law of the presidential nominee	
Catherine Cortez Masto	U.S. Senator from Nevada (2017–present)	
Josh Shapiro	Governor of Pennsylvania (2023–present)	
Amanda Gorman	Poet and activist	
Oprah Winfrey	Television host (Independent)	
Wes Moore	Governor of Maryland (2023–present)	
Pete Buttigieg	U.S. Secretary of Transportation (2021–2025); Former Mayor of South Bend (2012–2020) (Note: Buttigieg spoke at the convention in his personal capacity, and was recognized as the Former Mayor of South Bend, Indiana, to avoid conflict with the Hatch Act.)	
Amy Klobuchar	U.S. Senator from Minnesota (2007–present)	
Tim Walz	Nominee for vice president Governor of Minnesota (2019–present); Acceptance speech	

== Fourth night (Thursday, August 22: For Our Future) ==
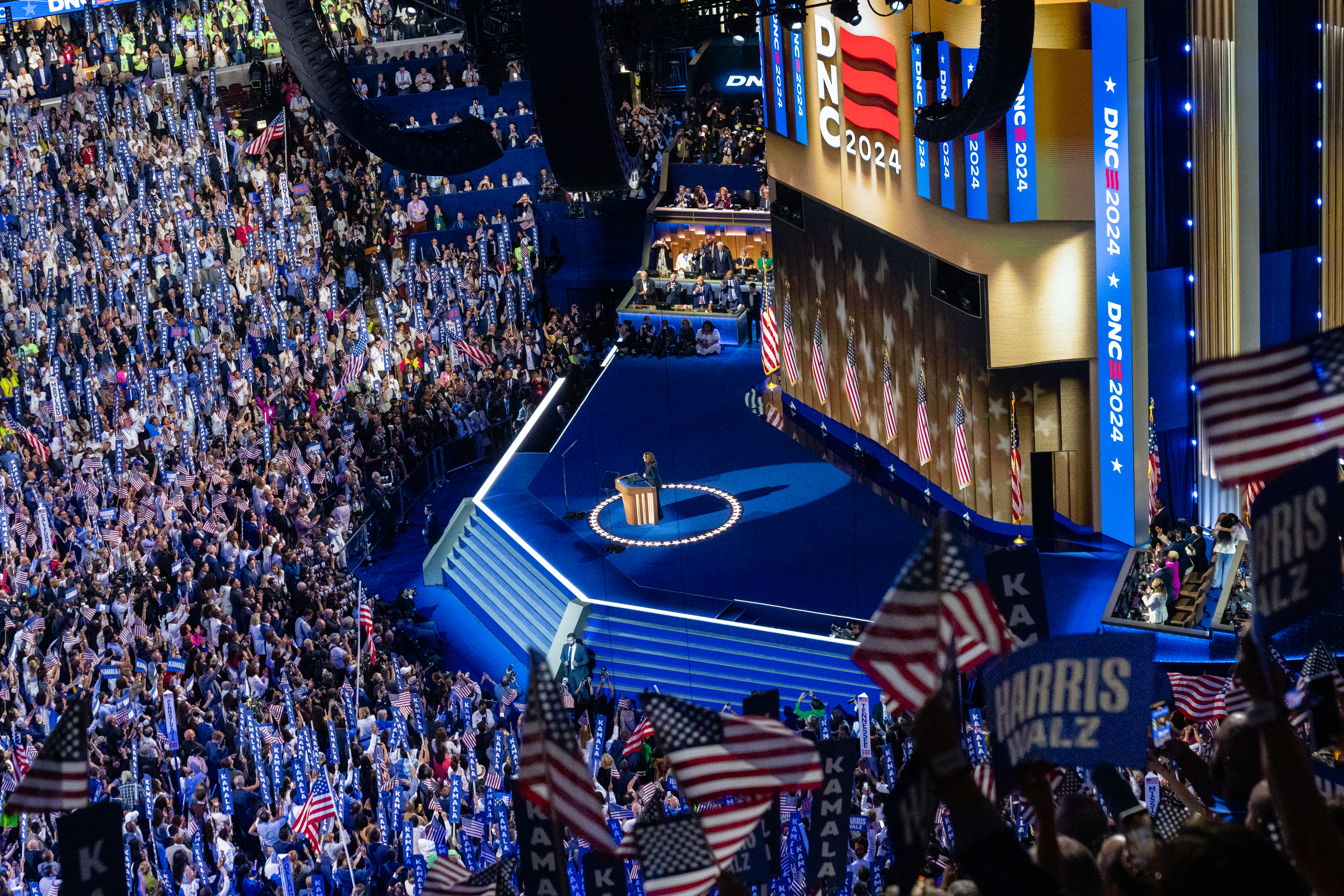
Harris delivering her acceptance speech on the convention's fourth night

The final night was emceed by actress Kerry Washington. Presidential nominee Vice President Harris delivered her acceptance speech.

=== Speech schedule of fourth night ===
Speaker	Position/Notability	Ref
Kerry Washington	Actress; Host	
Veronica Escobar	U.S. Representative from TX-16 (2019–present)	
Becky Pringle	President of the National Education Association (2020–present)	
Randi Weingarten	President of the American Federation of Teachers (2008–present)	
Alex Padilla	U.S. Senator from California (2021–present)	
Marcia Fudge	Former U.S. Secretary of Housing and Urban Development (2021–2024)	
Ted Lieu	U.S. Representative from CA-36 (2015–present)	
Tammy Baldwin	U.S. Senator from Wisconsin (2013–present)	
Katherine Clark	House Minority Whip (2023–present); U.S. Representative from MA-05 (2013–present)	
Joe Neguse	U.S. Representative from CO-02 (2019–present)	
Leonardo Williams	Mayor of Durham, North Carolina (2023–present)	
Raja Krishnamoorthi	U.S. Representative from IL-08 (2017–present)	
Bob Casey Jr.	U.S. Senator from Pennsylvania (2007–2025)	
Elizabeth Warren	U.S. Senator from Massachusetts (2013–present)	
Jason Crow	U.S. Representative from CO-06 (2019–present)	
Elissa Slotkin	U.S. Representative from MI-07 (2019–2025); Democratic nominee in the 2024 United States Senate election in Michigan	
Pat Ryan	U.S. Representative from NY-18 (2022–present)	
Al Sharpton	Civil rights activist and Baptist minister	
Yusef Salaam	New York City Council member from the 9th district (2024–present) and one of the Exonerated Five	
Korey Wise	Criminal justice reform activist and one of the Exonerated Five	
Lisa Madigan	Former Attorney General of Illinois (2003–2019)	
Marc Morial	President of the National Urban League (2003–present)	
Maura Healey	Governor of Massachusetts (2023–present)	
Deb Haaland	U.S. Secretary of the Interior (2021–2025); Former U.S. Representative from NM-01 (2019–2021) (Note: Haaland spoke at the convention in her personal capacity, and was recognized as the Former Congresswoman from New Mexico to avoid conflict with the Hatch Act.)	
Maxwell Frost	U.S. Representative from FL-10 (2023–present)	
Stephen Curry (remarks delivered remotely)	Professional basketball player	
Shomari Figures	Democratic nominee in the 2024 United States House of Representatives election in AL-02	
Colin Allred	U.S. Representative from TX-32 (2019–present); Democratic nominee in the 2024 United States Senate election in Texas	
Meena Harris	Niece of the presidential nominee	
Ella Emhoff	Stepdaughter of the presidential nominee	
D. L. Hughley	Stand-up comedian	
Lucy McBath	U.S. Representative from GA-07 (2019–present)	
Gabby Giffords	Former U.S. Representative from AZ-08 (2007–2012)	
P!nk performs her song "What About Us"
Mark Kelly	U.S. Senator from Arizona (2020–present), former astronaut	
Leon Panetta	Former U.S. Secretary of Defense (2011–2013)	
Ruben Gallego	U.S. Representative from AZ-03 (2015–2025); Democratic nominee in the 2024 United States Senate election in Arizona	
Gretchen Whitmer	Governor of Michigan (2019–present)	
Eva Longoria	Actress and director	
Adam Kinzinger	Former U.S. Representative from IL-16 (2013–2023; Republican)	
Maya Harris	Sister of the presidential nominee	
Roy Cooper	Governor of North Carolina (2017–2025)	
Kamala Harris	Nominee for president Vice President of the United States (2021–present); Acceptance speech	
