= WWPR-FM =

Urban contemporary radio station in New York City

- New York, New York; United States
- Broadcast area: New York metropolitan area
- Frequency: 105.1 MHz (HD Radio)
- Branding: Power 105.1

Programming
- Language: English
- Format: Urban contemporary
- Subchannels: HD2: DaNu Radio (Russian programming); HD3: WWRL simulcast
- Affiliations: iHeartRadio; Premiere Networks

Ownership
- Owner: iHeartMedia; (iHM Licenses, LLC)
- Sister stations: WAXQ; WHTZ; WKTU; WLTW; WOR; WWRL

History
- First air date: December 14, 1953
- Former call signs: WWRL-FM (1953–1957); WRFM (1957–1986); WNSR (1986–1992); WMXV (1992–1996); WDBZ (1996–1997); WNSR (1997–1998); WBIX (1998–1999); WTJM (1999–2002)
- Call sign meaning: scrambling of "Power"

Technical information
- Licensing authority: FCC
- Facility ID: 6373
- Class: B
- ERP: 6,000 watts (analog); 239 watts (digital)
- HAAT: 415 meters (1,362 ft)
- Transmitter coordinates: 40.748417°N 73.985694°W

Links
- Public license information: Public file; LMS
- Webcast: Listen live (via iHeartRadio)
- Website: power1051.iheart.com

WWPR-FM (105.1 FM) is an urban contemporary music radio station licensed to serve New York, New York. The station is owned by iHeartMedia and broadcasts from studios located at 125 West 55th Street in Midtown Manhattan, while its transmitter is located at the Empire State Building. WWPR-FM is the flagship station of the nationally syndicated morning show, The Breakfast Club.

== History ==
=== WWRL-FM and WRFM (1953–1985) ===
The station first signed on the air on December 14, 1953, as WWRL-FM. The station was co-owned with WWRL (1600 AM) by radio enthusiast William Reuman, studios were in Woodside, Queens. The call sign was changed to WRFM in October 1957, breaking away from the AM simulcast with a diversified and classical music format.

Bonneville International, the broadcast arm of the Church of Jesus Christ of Latter-day Saints, purchased WRFM in 1967. The following year, WRFM, billing itself as "Stereo 105", adopted a beautiful music format that was developed by program director Marlin Taylor. WRFM played mostly instrumental music with about one vocal every 15 minutes. It featured the works of such artists as Mantovani, Henry Mancini, Ferrante & Teicher, Percy Faith, Hollyridge Strings, Leroy Anderson, Frank Mills and Richard Clayderman. Mixed in were vocals by such artists as Frank Sinatra, Johnny Mathis, Peggy Lee, the Lettermen, Nat King Cole and Barbra Streisand.

Ratings for the station were satisfactory, and for a couple of times, WRFM was the top-rated FM station in New York. WRFM competed for beautiful music listeners with the simulcast of WPAT and WPAT-FM, with two other easy listening stations, WTFM and WVNJ-FM usually trailing. As the 1980s began, WRFM started mixing in some soft contemporary artist vocals including the Carpenters, Barry Manilow, Kenny Rogers and Dionne Warwick, and it was also used on an electronic program guide in Manhattan throughout the '80s. In 1984, the station increased vocals to six per hour and cut back on adult standards titles, while also adding softer songs by top 40 artists, such as Billy Joel, Michael Jackson, Chicago, Elton John, the Beatles and Whitney Houston.

=== Soft Rock 105FM (1986–1990) ===
The WNSR logo that was in use from 1986 until rebranding as "Mix 105" in 1990.

On April 17, 1986, the station switched to a gold-based adult contemporary format with the call letters WNSR, for New York's Soft Rock. WNSR focused on songs from the 1960s and 1970s, with some 1980s titles and a moderate number of current adult contemporary songs as well. Initially, the station's ratings were modest. However, once AC competitor WYNY went to a country music format, WNSR's ratings went up.

=== Mix 105 (1990–1995) ===
In January 1990, the station's moniker became "Mix 105", and shifted to more of a hot adult contemporary format, focusing on the 1970s, 1980s, and current hits, with only a few 1960s titles. By April 1992, when the station changed its call letters to WMXV, the 1960s hits were gone, and more recent music was added. By 1995, the station was only playing hits of the 1980s and 1990s, and even mixing in some lighter modern rock songs, as many other hot AC stations were doing at this time.

=== 105.1 The Buzz (1996–1997) ===
On November 13, 1996, the hot AC format at WMXV abruptly ended, and after a day of stunting with music from Broadway musicals, the station switched formats to an adult-friendly modern AC format as WDBZ ("The Buzz").

On August 5, 1997, with ratings on the decline, the call sign changed back to WNSR. The original plan was for the station to drop the "Buzz" format in favor of an oldies-based AC format, playing songs from 1964 to current hits. The station was to have launched on August 18, 1997, with television commercials set to air. However, Bonneville instead decided to sell the station to Chancellor Media, which also owned WHTZ, WLTW, WKTU, and WAXQ.

As a result, the format change for 105.1 was canceled and the station remained "The Buzz" for a while longer, with the reverted WNSR call letters. Gradually, from September through November 1997, the station returned to hot AC, and then mainstream AC. For the next few months, the station would simply be known on-air as "FM 105.1", and only used the WNSR call sign for the legal station identification.

=== Big 105 (1998) ===
On January 21, 1998, at 6:30 pm, the station relaunched as "Big 105", with the call letters WBIX (which took effect on April 13). The first song on "Big 105" was "Big Time" by Peter Gabriel. Despite this relaunch, the station played basically the same music as it did in the months before, and could not compete with highly rated WLTW.

Initially, Big 105 was musically very close to WLTW, but evolved to a hot AC format by that May, similar to what WPLJ was playing at the time. WBIX also added Danny Bonaduce as its morning show host. It also added Casey Kasem's American Top 20 syndicated countdown program on Sundays, coinciding with Kasem's move to Chancellor Media from Westwood One earlier in the year. Ratings continued to decline, and by October 1998, WBIX leaned toward modern AC, similar to the former "Buzz" format, but not as deep.

=== Jammin' 105 (1998–2002) ===
The Jammin 105 logo that lasted from 1998 through early 2002.

On December 4, 1998, at 6:00 p.m., after playing "Good Riddance (Time of Your Life)" by Green Day, the station flipped to the then-growing "Jammin' Oldies" format, and (after a "name the station" contest) branded as "Jammin' 105". The first song on "Jammin'" was "Celebration" by Kool & the Gang. On March 1, 1999, WBIX changed call letters to WTJM, to match the "Jammin'" branding. The station played rhythmic and dance pop hits of the mid-1960s through the 1980s. TV comedian Jay Thomas was hired for morning drive time. WTJM did better in the ratings than the previous format, and its results initially challenged those of longtime oldies station WCBS-FM.

Chancellor merged with Capstar Broadcasting to form AMFM Inc. in 1999. Then, in 2000, Clear Channel Communications merged with AMFM Inc., giving WTJM and the other four stations a new owner. Under Clear Channel (now iHeartMedia), WTJM evolved into an urban oldies direction, and then to an urban adult contemporary format, while keeping the "Jammin' 105" moniker. Frankie Blue was brought in to program the shift to urban AC. He immediately brought in Jeff Foxx (formerly of WRKS and WBLS) and teamed him with comedian George Wallace to form the "Jammin' New York Wake-up Club". While the morning show was a hit, it did not warrant keeping the format due to the station's low ratings in other dayparts.

=== Power 105.1 (2002–present) ===
At 6:05 a.m. on March 14, 2002, the station abruptly changed, as it flipped to its current mainstream urban format as WWPR-FM "Power 105.1". A speculated reason for the format change is that while they could not beat competitor WQHT ("Hot 97"), they could take enough ratings away from them to keep them from being number one, which would leave WWPR's sister station WLTW with a comfortable lead in that race (prior to the change, WQHT and WLTW had alternated at the top spot).

By 2004, WWPR-FM technically became the market's only urban contemporary station due to the transition of 107.5 WBLS from urban contemporary to urban adult contemporary. WQHT reports as rhythmic contemporary to Mediabase & Nielsen BDS, although WQHT was an urban reporter on Nielsen BDS from 2006 to 2007. WWPR-FM and WQHT's playlists are similar, and the two stations aim at roughly the same audience.

WQHT had been the only New York station featuring current hip hop and R&B since its owner, Emmis Communications, purchased WRKS in 1994 and moved that station towards an adult R&B format. In an effort to build an audience, WWPR-FM brought in former Hot 97 personalities and Yo! MTV Raps hosts Ed Lover and Doctor Dré to anchor the station's morning show. The station then entered into the top five of the Arbitron ratings, a position it maintained for several years.

The station terminated Doctor Dre's contract in December 2003 and gave Ed Lover a new co-host in rapper-turned-radio personality Monie Love. The morning team lasted for about a year. By the end of 2004, WWPR decided to heat up the rivalry with WQHT by bringing in ex-Hot 97 morning show hosts Star & Timothy "Buc Wild" Joseph (January 3, 1979 – September 6, 2026) as their new morning drive team, as well-known disc jockeys were deemed critical to the station's success.

The "Star and Buc Wild Morning Show" was replaced in 2006 by Live with Big Tigger and Egypt. That team was later replaced by a returning Ed Lover, who was later joined by Malikha Mallette. This last show incarnation ended on November 19, 2010, when Ed Lover was released from the station and Mallette was reassigned to the midday shift, replacing De Ja.

== The Breakfast Club ==
WWPR is the flagship station of the nationally syndicated The Breakfast Club morning show. It is hosted by DJ Envy, Charlamagne tha God, Jess Hilarious, and Loren LoRosa. It debuted in December 2010 and grew to be one of the most popular morning programs in New York. The program is heard in dozens of other cities through Premiere Networks, co-owned with WWPR-FM. The Source, a hip-hop magazine, named The Breakfast Club the No. 1 radio program in the nation.

DJ Envy is the host of MTV2 shows Sucker Free and The Week in Jams. Charlamagne Tha God is the co-host of MTV2's Guy Code and was a former co-host of The Wendy Williams Experience.

In April 2013, Premiere Networks launched a weekend version of the show Weekends with the Breakfast Club, which features a Top 20 countdown. Four months later, The Breakfast Club weekday version went into national syndication. The show is heard in Tucson; Milwaukee, Charleston, South Carolina; Birmingham; New Orleans; Waco; Montgomery; Jacksonville; Miami; Norfolk; Columbus, Ohio; Houston, Detroit; Columbus, Georgia; Atlanta, Lexington, Kentucky; Dayton; Charleston, West Virginia; Las Vegas; Champaign, Illinois; Valdosta, Georgia; Beaumont, Texas, Wilmington; Louisville; Cincinnati; and Orlando. A video version of the show is also carried weekdays on BET.

== Staff ==
=== On-air ===
- Charlamagne Tha God
- DJ Clue?
- DJ Envy
- DJ Prostyle
- DJ Self
- Angie Martinez

=== Former DJs ===
- DJ Spinbad
- DJ Yonny
- Doctor Dré
- Egypt
- Ed Lover
- Malikha Mallette
- Tony Touch
