= Fatal Attraction (2013 TV program) =

American true crime television series

- Genre: Documentary; True crime
- Directed by: Chad Cunningham; Jeffrey Woods; Steven Wesley Miller; Wesley Caylor; Brian Peery; Robert Ivkovic
- Presented by: Malikha Mallette (Season 2-present); Lynn Whitfield (Season 1)
- Original language: English
- No. of seasons: 15
- No. of episodes: 443

Production
- Executive producers: Tia A. Smith (151 episodes, 2013-2019); Todd Moss (25 episodes, 2013-2020); Stephen Land (20 episodes, 2013-2014); Allison Wallach (13 episodes, 2015-2020); Eric Wetherington (9 episodes, 2013-2023)
- Running time: 40-60 minutes
- Production company: Jupiter Entertainment

Original release
- Release: June 3, 2013 – present

Fatal Attraction is an American true crime television program that airs on TV One. The series debuted on June 3, 2013, and is produced by Jupiter Entertainment. On January 24, 2019, TV One announced it was renewing the program for an eighth season which premiered on January 28, 2019. On January 10, 2020, it was announced that the ninth season would premiere on January 13, 2020.

== Overview ==
The program features non-fiction narratives of crimes committed by a partner in an abusive relationship. The program is edited in a documentary style, using a central voice-over narration by Malikha Mallette, as well as interviews with people who have first-hand knowledge of the case, including law-enforcement officials, lawyers, journalists, friends and family members of both the victims and the accused. The first season was narrated by Lynn Whitfield.

In 2014, a subject in one of the shows claimed he had been unfairly depicted as a killer, and filed suit for defamation against TV One and Jupiter in Maryland District Court, seeking $650,000 in damages. The lawsuit was dismissed.
