= Charlamagne tha God =

American radio personality (born 1978)

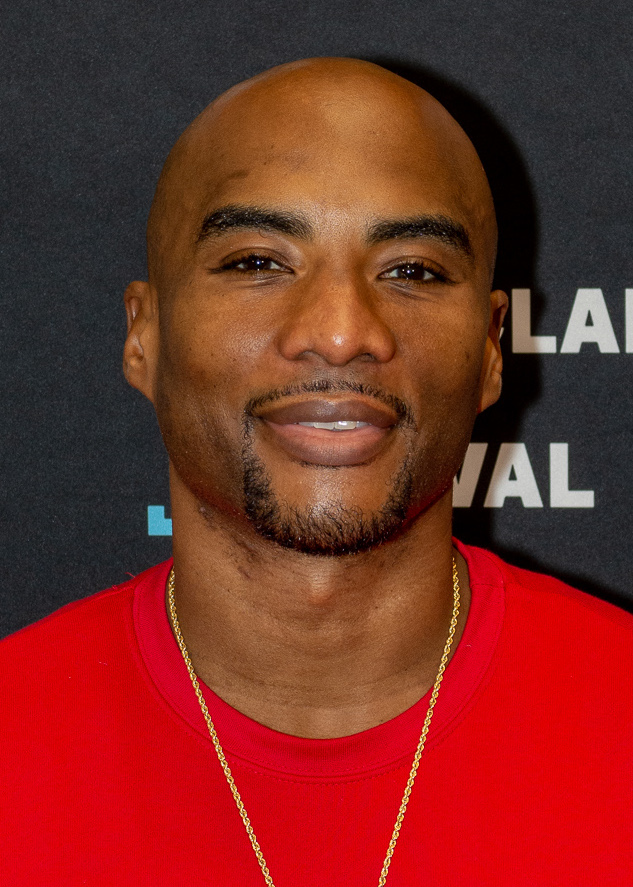
- McKelvey in 2019
- Born: Lenard Larry McKelvey; June 29, 1978 (age 48); Charleston, South Carolina, U.S.
- Occupations: Radio host; television presenter
- Presenting career
- Show: Hell of a Week with Charlamagne tha God; The Breakfast Club (co-host)
- Station: Power 105.1
- Time slot: 6–10 a.m.
- Country: United States

Lenard Larry McKelvey (/ləˈnɑːrd məˈkɛlvɪ/; born June 29, 1978), known professionally as Charlamagne tha God or simply Charlamagne, is an American radio host and television presenter. He is a co-host of the nationally syndicated radio show The Breakfast Club along with DJ Envy, with whom he was inducted into the Radio Hall of Fame in 2020 for their work on the show. He also hosted the late-night talk show Hell of a Week with Charlamagne tha God on Comedy Central.

Prior to his work on The Breakfast Club, he worked as a radio personality for several radio stations and also spent time as second mic on The Wendy Williams Experience with Wendy Williams on VH1. He is the founder of the Black Effect Podcast Network, and was featured on Guy Code, Guy Court and Girl Code. He was also a VJ for The Week in Jams with DJ Envy and Sofi Green. In 2015, McKelvey began hosting the MTV2 show Uncommon Sense.

In the shock jock tradition, one of McKelvey's personal mantras is "bite my tongue for no one"; he was called "hip-hop's Howard Stern" by Rolling Stone magazine.

== Early life ==
McKelvey was born to Larry Thomas McKelvey, a Jehovah's Witness-turned-Muslim, and his wife, an English teacher and Jehovah's Witness, on June 29, 1978. He grew up in Moncks Corner, South Carolina, where as a teenager he was arrested twice for "possession with intent to distribute" marijuana and cocaine.

When McKelvey was arrested a third time, after being near a (non-fatal) shooting, his father refused to pay his bail money. After 41 days in jail, he asked his mother to pay for bail, at which point his father decided to "give him another chance". After his release, McKelvey began attending night school and graduated from Berkeley High School (in Moncks Corner).

In 2001, McKelvey was accused of sexual assault after a party. He denied having sexual relations with the accuser and cooperated with the authorities, providing DNA evidence which failed to support the claim that he had had sex with the victim. The sexual assault charges were dropped, and he later pled guilty to a misdemeanor count of contributing to the delinquency of a minor, for which he received three years probation.

== Career ==
=== Early career in radio ===
McKelvey started his career in radio as an intern for Z93 Jamz in Charleston. He also spent time in Columbia with WHXT. He left South Carolina in 2006 to become second mic to radio host Wendy Williams. He devised the stage name of "Charlamagne", derived from his street name as a drug dealer, "Charles," and developed a new persona based on Charlemagne (aka Charles the Great), who ruled much of Western Europe circa 800 A.D. He added "Tha God" because it "sounded cool".

His forward questioning and interviews of hip hop and R&B artists on radio raised his public profile but also caused rifts between himself and the guests of the show. The show was taken off the air in 2008, and he was laid off.

In 2008, he began hosting the morning show for 100.3 The Beat in Philadelphia. He was fired by the station in 2009, a few days after airing an interview with Beanie Sigel, who had released a track about Jay-Z, both of whom were former rappers for Roc-A-Fella Records. Speculation in the media was that Jay-Z was behind the firing of McKelvey due to the interview. He returned to Moncks Corner to live with his mother for about a year prior to being offered a position with WWPR-FM to co-host The Breakfast Club.

=== 2010–2016: The Breakfast Club and television ===
In 2010, McKelvey became a co-host on The Breakfast Club, alongside DJ Envy and Angela Yee on WWPR-FM in New York City, along with its national television simulcast on Revolt. The show was started by Power 105.1 to compete with Hot 97, one of the most popular hip-hop morning shows in New York. He was brought in as a co-host due to his radio experience and knowing "how to get to the edge and not go over it". Once part of the show, he gave himself the title "Prime Minister of Pissing People Off, the Architect of Aggravation, and the Ruler of Rubbing People the Wrong Way."

In 2011, McKelvey began serving as a cast member of Guy Code, a comedy television show on MTV2 that talks about a special code of conduct just for men. The show ended in March 2015. He also starred on the MTV2 show Charlamagne & Friends. He co-hosted MTV New Year's live from Times Square in both 2013 and 2014, and in 2015 he was a correspondent for the 2015 MTV Video Music Awards pre-show.

In 2014, he was dubbed "hip-hop's Howard Stern" by Rolling Stone magazine. The following year, he began hosting Uncommon Sense with Charlamagne tha God on MTV2.

=== 2017–present: book writing, podcast, and Radio Hall of Fame ===
In 2017, his book Black Privilege: Opportunity Comes to Those Who Create It, which he called "a self-help guide for the hood," was published by the Simon & Schuster imprint Touchstone. Steven Kurutz of The New York Times gave the book a mostly positive review, describing Black Privilege as "a street-smart self-help guide" with typically blunt advice offered in eight different principles. The book was ranked sixth in the May 7, 2017, New York Times list of best-selling hardback non-fiction. McKelvey's second book, Shook One: Anxiety Playing Tricks on Me was released on October 23, 2018.

In 2019, he became the host of Emerging Hollywood, a YouTube series from The Hollywood Reporter. On this show, he speaks with Hollywood professionals to discuss various political topics. His past guests on the show include Trevor Noah and Jameela Jamil.

In 2020, McKelvey founded the Black Effect Podcast Network in partnership with iHeartMedia. In August 2020, he and his Breakfast Club co-hosts, Angela Yee and DJ Envy, were inducted into the Radio Hall of Fame. With fellow MTV2 personality Andrew Schulz, he hosts The Brilliant Idiots podcast on Combat Jack's Loud Speakers Network.

McKelvey became the host of the late-night talk show Tha God's Honest Truth in 2021.

In 2024, he released the book Get Honest or Die Lying: Why Small Talk Sucks.

== Personal life ==
He is married to his high school sweetheart, Jessica Gadsden, a fitness coach and personal trainer who supported him financially when he struggled to maintain a job in radio. In 2021, he explained: "Literally, the first time I ever went to a radio station to fill out an application for an internship, my wife drove me because my license was suspended."

== Discography ==
- South Crack: The Album (2008)

== Filmography ==
=== Film ===
Year	Title	Role	Notes
2011	This Thing of Ours	Shottah	Short
2017	Grow House	Black Jesus	
2017	Bodied	Hunnid Gramz	
2018	Canal Street	Himself	
2018	The After Party	Himself	
2021	Boogie	Patrick	
TBA	King of the South †	Marvin Miller	

=== Television ===
Year	Title	Role	Notes
2006	The Wendy Williams Experience	Himself/Co-Host	Main Co-Host
2011–15	Guy Code	Himself/Co-Host	Main Co-Host
2012	MTV's Hip Hop POV	Himself/Co-Host	Main Co-Host
2012–13	The Week in Jams	Himself/Co-Host	Main Co-Host
2014	Charlamagne & Friends	Himself/Host	Main Host
2014	Bethenny	Himself/Panelist	Episode: "Episode #2.125"
2014	The Challenge: After Show	Himself	Episode: "ChallengeMania: Superfan Edition"
2014	Landing in Mumbai	Spirit Guide	Recurring Cast: Season 3
2015	Catfish: The TV Show	Himself	Episode: "Miracle & Javonni"
2015-16	The Nightly Show with Larry Wilmore	Himself/Panelist	Episode: "Episode #1.150" & "#2.79"
2015-16	Uncommon Sense with Charlamagne	Himself/Host	Main Host
2015–19	Empire	Himself	Guest Cast: Season 2-3 & 6
2017	The Breaks	Himself	Episode: "Blind Alley"
2017	Ridiculousness	Himself	Episode: "Charlamagne tha God"
2017	SafeWord	Himself	Episode: "Charlamagne tha God vs. Amber Rose"
2018	Uncensored	Himself	Episode: "Charlamagne tha God"
2018	Hip Hop Squares	Himself/Panelist	Recurring Panelist: Season 5
2018	Catfish: Trolls	Himself/Host	Main Host
2018	The Talk	Himself/Guest Co-Host	Episode: "Episode #8.182"
2018	Queen Sugar	Himself	Episode: "Delicate and Strangely Made"
2019	Surviving R. Kelly	Himself	Episode: "Black Girls Matter"
2019	Wu-Tang Clan: Of Mics and Men	Himself	Episode: "101"
2019	The Next Big Thing	Himself/Judge	Episode: "Episode #1.1"
2019	Growing Up Hip Hop: New York	Himself	Episode: "Face the Fyre"
2019	Untold Stories of Hip Hop	Himself	Recurring Guest
2019	First Wives Club	Himself	Episode: "One Night Only"
2020	Tooning Out the News	Himself	Episode: "Episode #1.32"
2020	Dave	Himself	Recurring Cast: Season 1
2021	Obama: In Pursuit of a More Perfect Union	Himself	Episode: "Episode #1.2"
2021	Queens	Himself (voice)	Episode: "Behind the Throne"
2021–22	Hell of a Week with Charlamagne tha God	Himself/Host	Main Host
2022	That Damn Michael Che	Himself	Episode: "Black Mediocrity"
2022	Murder Inc Records Docu-series	Himself	Main Guest
2022	Celebrity Game Face	Himself/Contestant	Episode: "Saweetie Gets Spicy"
2023	Soul of a Nation	Himself	Episode: "Hip Hop @ 50: Rhythms, Rhymes & Reflections"
2023	Black Pop: Celebrating the Power of Black Culture	Himself	
2023	Welcome to Rap City	Himself	Recurring Guest
2023	The Daily Show	Himself/Host	Recurring Host: Season 28
2023	Bupkis	Priest	Episode: "Show Me the Way"
2023	The Muppets Mayhem	Himself	Episode: "Track 9: Drift Away"

=== Documentaries ===
Year	Title	Role
2009	Kiss & Tail: The Hollywood Jumpoff	
2014	Knifed Up	
2018	Black, White & Blue	
2024	In the Bubble with Jaime	Producer

=== Music videos ===
Year	Song	Artist
2014	"Choices (Yup)"	E-40

=== Video games ===
Year	Title	Role
2026	Grand Theft Auto VI	Charlamagne
