= Hell of a Week with Charlamagne tha God =

American late-night talk show

- Genre: Late-night talk show Variety/News satire Comedy
- Created by: Charlamagne tha God Stephen Colbert
- Presented by: Charlamagne tha God
- Country of origin: United States
- Original language: English
- No. of seasons: 2
- No. of episodes: 18

Production
- Executive producers: Charlamagne tha God; Stephen Colbert; Chris Licht; Aaron McGruder; Norman Aladjem; Kristyn Deignan; James Dixon; Rachael Edwards; Karen Kinney; Ari Pearce
- Producer: Jordana Jason
- Running time: 22 minutes
- Production companies: MTV Entertainment Studios; CThaGodWorld Productions; Spartina Productions

Original release
- Network: Comedy Central
- Release: September 17, 2021 – December 15, 2022

Hell of a Week with Charlamagne tha God (formerly Tha God's Honest Truth) is a late-night talk show and variety series hosted by Lenard "Charlamagne" McKelvey. It aired on Comedy Central from September 2021 to December 2022 and was executive produced by Charlamagne and The Late Show host Stephen Colbert.

On May 18, 2023, the show was cancelled.

== Production ==
The first season of the series was titled Tha God's Honest Truth with Lenard ‘Charlamagne’ McKelvey; Charlamagne stated that the program would carry influence from its timeslot competitor on HBO, Real Time with Bill Maher, along with Jon Stewart's incarnation of The Daily Show, arguing that he had "always appreciated shows that could put the medicine in the candy". Stephen Colbert and The Boondocks creator Aaron McGruder are also involved in the series, with Charlamagne acknowledging his past work with Colbert and his ability to present current affairs in a comedic fashion, and arguing that cartoonists were "literally able to predict the future".

Charlamagne also specifically requested that he be billed by his real name, explaining that it "snaps me back into reality and it just keeps me from being a caricature of myself."

In its first season, the series largely featured "deep dives" into social issues, including those affecting younger demographics and African Americans, and interviews with notable figures such as politicians. In July 2022, it was announced that the show would be reformatted for its second season beginning July 28, retitled Hell of A Week with Charlamagne tha God, and switching to a panel discussion format; he cited that there were already enough programs discussing "problems", and that he wanted to "discuss solutions".

== Episodes ==
No.	Title	Original release date	US viewers (millions)
1	"Decrackerfication"	September 17, 2021	N/A
2	"Only the Feds I Fear"	September 24, 2021	N/A
3	"Critical Racist Theory"	October 1, 2021	N/A
4	"Mental Health - Keep That Same Healing Energy"	October 8, 2021	N/A
5	"The Digital Devil"	October 15, 2021	N/A
6	"A Tale of the Cowardly Donkeys"	October 29, 2021	N/A
7	"Nuffin Season"	November 5, 2021	N/A
8	"American Fake-Triotism"	November 12, 2021	N/A
9	"Is Capitalism CAP?"	November 19, 2021	N/A
10	"The RittenHouse that Kyle Built"	December 3, 2021	N/A
11	"Nobody Wins When the Family Feuds"	December 10, 2021	N/A
12	"Jesus Verzuz Santa"	December 17, 2021	N/A
