= 2020 United States Senate election in South Carolina =

- November 3, 2020
- Turnout: 72.1% ▲
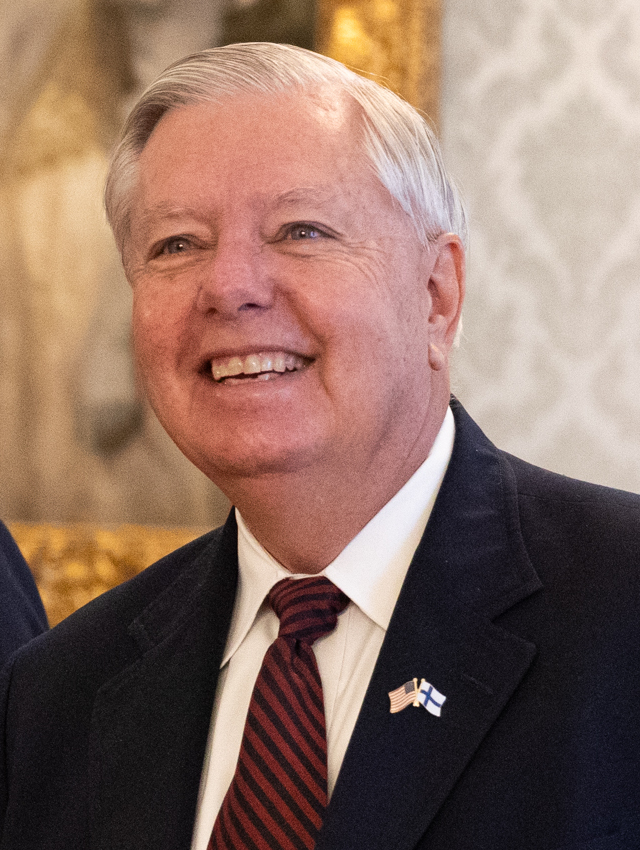

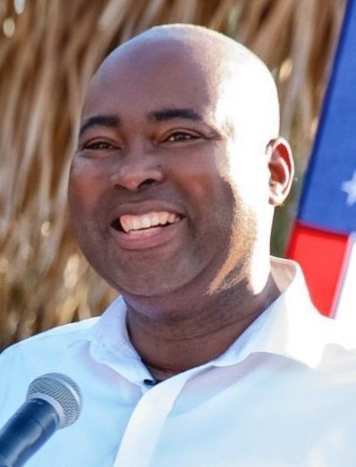
Nominee	Lindsey Graham	Jaime Harrison
Party	Republican	Democratic
Popular vote	1,369,137	1,110,828
Percentage	54.44%	44.17%
- Graham: 40–50% 50–60% 60–70% 70–80% 80–90% >90% Harrison: 40–50% 50–60% 60–70% 70–80% 80–90% >90% Tie: 40–50% No data
US Senator before election
Lindsey Graham
Republican
Elected US Senator
Lindsey Graham
Republican

The 2020 United States Senate election in South Carolina was held on November 3, 2020, to elect a member of the United States Senate to represent the state of South Carolina. Republican incumbent Lindsey Graham won re-election to a fourth term, defeating Democratic nominee Jaime Harrison. Primary elections were held on June 9, 2020. Graham died of cardiac arrest on July 11, 2026, having already announced his run for re-election nearly the end of his term. His sister Darline Graham, who was appointed to replace him by governor Henry McMaster.

Despite forecasting throughout the last few months of the race showing a very close race as well as Harrison having record fundraising numbers, Graham defeated Harrison by 54.4% to 44.2% and a margin of 10.2% in the November 3, 2020, general election. Harrison slightly outperformed Democratic nominee Joe Biden in the concurrent presidential election, who lost to President Donald Trump by 11.7% in South Carolina.

== Republican primary ==
=== Candidates ===
==== Nominee ====
- Lindsey Graham, incumbent U.S. senator

==== Eliminated in primary ====
- Dwayne “Duke” Buckner, attorney and owner of Buckner Law Firm located in Walterboro
- Michael J. LaPierre, businessman
- Joe Reynolds, chief engineer in the US Merchant Marine

==== Withdrew ====
- Johnny Garcia, Air Force veteran
- Peggy Kandies, Charleston art teacher, home decorator, and former IBM employee
- Mark Sloan, Greer minister and manufacturing executive
- David Weikle, radio host, US Marine veteran, and candidate for the South Carolina House of Representatives in 2018 (switched to the Libertarian primary)

==== Declined ====
- Eric Bolling, former Fox News host
- Mark Burns, Easley pastor and former candidate for South Carolina's 4th congressional district in 2018
- Harlan Hill, Republican (formerly Democratic) political consultant and commentator
- John Warren, Greenville businessman and candidate for Governor of South Carolina in 2018
- Carey Wilson

==== Endorsements ====
Lindsey Graham

Executive branch officials

- Donald Trump, president of the United States (2017–2021)
- Mike Pence, vice president of the United States (2017–2021)

Organizations

- National Right to Life Committee

=== Polling ===
Poll source	Date(s) administered	Sample size (Note: Key: A – all adults RV – registered voters LV – likely voters V – unclear)	Margin of error	Lindsey Graham	Other	Undecided
Change Research	June 11–14, 2019	1,183 (LV)	± 2.9%	70%	4% (Note: Warren with 3%; Kandies with 1%; Burns, Hill, Reynolds and Wilson with 0%)	26%

Hypothetical polling

with Generic Republican

Poll source	Date(s) administered	Sample size	Margin of error	Lindsey Graham	Generic Republican	Other
Change Research	June 11–14, 2019	1,183 (LV)	± 2.9%	79%	19%	2% (Note: Would not vote with 2%)

=== Results ===
Results by county: 40–50% Graham 50–60% Graham 60–70% Graham 70–80% Graham 80–90% Graham

Republican primary results
Party	Candidate	Votes	%
Republican	Lindsey Graham (incumbent)	317,512	67.69%
Republican	Michael LaPierre	79,932	17.04%
Republican	Joe Reynolds	43,029	9.17%
Republican	Dwayne "Duke" Buckner	28,570	6.09%
Total votes		469,043	100.00%

== Democratic primary ==
=== Candidates ===
==== Nominee ====
- Jaime Harrison, former chair of the South Carolina Democratic Party and associate chairman of the Democratic National Committee

==== Withdrawn ====
- Gloria Bromell Tinubu, former Georgia state representative, candidate for Lieutenant Governor of South Carolina in 2018, and nominee for South Carolina's 7th congressional district in 2012 and 2014 (endorsed Jaime Harrison)
- William Stone, legal researcher
- Justin Wooton, activist

==== Declined ====
- Mandy Powers Norrell, state representative and candidate for lieutenant governor in 2018 (running for reelection)
- Bakari Sellers, political commentator and former state representative

=== Endorsements ===
Jaime Harrison (D)

Executive branch officials

- Barack Obama, former president of the United States (2009–2017)

U.S. senators

- Amy Klobuchar, Minnesota (2007–present)

U.S. representatives

- Jim Clyburn, SC-06 (1993–present)

Statewide officials

- Jim Hodges, former governor of South Carolina (1999–2003)

Local officials

- Pete Buttigieg, former mayor of South Bend, Indiana (2012–2020)

Organizations

- Climate Hawks Vote
- The Collective PAC
- Congressional Black Caucus
- Council for a Livable World
- Democracy for America
- Democratic Senatorial Campaign Committee
- End Citizens United
- Everytown for Gun Safety
- Giffords
- Human Rights Campaign
- League of Conservation Voters
- MoveOn
- NARAL Pro-Choice America
- National Committee to Preserve Social Security and Medicare
- National Organization for Women
- Planned Parenthood Action Fund
- Population Connection

== Other candidates ==
=== Libertarian Party ===
==== General election write-in candidate ====
- Keenan Wallace Dunham, chair of the Horry County Libertarian Party

==== Withdrawn ====
- David Weikle, radio show host, US marine veteran, and candidate for the South Carolina House of Representatives in 2018 (remained on ballot)

=== Constitution Party ===
- Bill Bledsoe, Libertarian Party and Constitution Party nominee for the US Senate in 2016 (unofficially withdrew on October 1, 2020, and endorsed Graham, but still remained on the ballot as an active candidate)

=== Independents ===
==== Withdrawn ====
- Lloyd Williams

== General election ==
=== Predictions ===
Source	Ranking	As of
The Cook Political Report	Tossup	October 29, 2020
Inside Elections	Tilt R	October 28, 2020
Sabato's Crystal Ball	Lean R	November 2, 2020
Daily Kos	Lean R	October 30, 2020
Politico	Lean R	November 2, 2020
RCP	Tossup	October 23, 2020
DDHQ	Lean R	November 3, 2020
538	Likely R	November 2, 2020
Economist	Lean R	November 2, 2020

=== Advertisements ===
Jaime Harrison ran a number of ads attempting to attract conservative voters from Lindsey Graham by elevating Constitution Party candidate Bill Bledsoe as "too conservative—but in doing so, the would-be attack ad offers up right-wing voters a laundry list of things to like about him". Bledsoe endorsed Graham after withdrawing from the race, but his name remained on the ballot. He criticized the ads as fraudulent.

Meanwhile, Graham ran ads attempting to brand Harrison as a diehard liberal while connecting him with Nancy Pelosi and Chuck Schumer.

=== Post-primary endorsements ===
Jaime Harrison (D)

Organizations

- Black Economic Alliance
- Center for Biological Diversity
- J Street PAC
- Natural Resources Defense Council Action Fund
- Sierra Club
- Working Families Party

Labor unions

- United Auto Workers

Newspapers

- The State

=== Polling ===
Poll source	Date(s) administered	Sample size	Margin of error	Lindsey Graham (R)	Jaime Harrison (D)	Other / Undecided
0ptimus	October 31 – November 2, 2020	817 (LV)	± 3.9%	51%	41%	7% (Note: "Third party candidate" with 2%; "Refused" with 0%; Undecided with 6%)
Data For Progress	October 27 – November 1, 2020	1,121 (LV)	± 2.9%	49%	46%	5% (Note: Bledsoe (C) with 4%; "Other candidate/write-in" with 1%)
Swayable (Note: Archived November 13, 2020, at the Wayback Machine)	October 23 – November 1, 2020	416 (LV)	± 7.5%	46%	52%	2% (Note: Bledsoe (C) with 2%)
Morning Consult	October 22–31, 2020	904 (LV)	± 3%	46%	44%	–
Data for Progress	October 22–27, 2020	1,196 (LV)	± 2.8%	46%	46%	8% (Note: Bledsoe (C) with 3%; "Other candidate or write-in" with 0%; Undecided with 5%)
Starboard Communications	October 26, 2020	800 (LV)	–	52%	43%	6% (Note: Bledsoe (C) and Undecided with 3%)
East Carolina University	October 24–25, 2020	763 (LV)	± 4.1%	49%	47%	3% (Note: "Refused" with 1%; Did/would not vote with 0%; Undecided with 2%)
Morning Consult	October 11–20, 2020	926 (LV)	± 3.2%	45%	47%	–
Brilliant Corners Research & Strategies (D) (Note: This poll was sponsored by Harrison's campaign)	October 11–16, 2020	525 (LV)	± 4.6%	45%	47%	8% (Note: Bledsoe (C) with 3%; "Other" with 0%; "Undecided/Refused" with 5%)
Siena College/NYT Upshot	October 9–14, 2020	605 (LV)	± 3.5%	46%	40%	14% (Note: Bledsoe (C) with 4%; would not vote with 2%; "Someone else" with 0%; "Undecided/Refused" with 8%)
Data for Progress	October 8–11, 2020	801 (LV)	± 3.5%	46%	47%	7% (Note: "Write-in candidate" with 1%; Undecided with 6%)
Morning Consult	October 2–11, 2020	903 (LV)	± 3%	48%	42%	–
ALG Research (D) (Note: This poll's sponsor, Lindsey Must Go, is a PAC opposing Lindsey Graham.)	September 29 – October 5, 2020	711 (LV)	–	46%	46%	8% (Note: Bledsoe (C) with 3%; Undecided with 5%)
GBAO Strategies (D) (Note: Poll sponsored by the DSCC, which has endorsed Jaime Harrison's campaign for the 2020 US Senate election in South Carolina before this poll's sampling period.)	September 24–28, 2020	800 (LV)	± 3.5%	47%	48%	3% (Note: Bledsoe (C) with 3%)
Data for Progress (D)	September 23–28, 2020	824 (LV)	± 3.4%	45% (Note: Standard VI response)	44%	11% (Note: Bledsoe (C) with 2%; Undecided with 9%)
Data for Progress (D)	September 23–28, 2020	824 (LV)	± 3.4%	47% (Note: If the only candidates were Graham and Harrison)	46%	7% (Note: Undecided with 7%)
Quinnipiac University	September 23–27, 2020	1,123 (LV)	± 2.9%	48%	48%	3% (Note: "Someone else" with 0%; Undecided with 3%)
YouGov	September 22–25, 2020	1,080 (LV)	± 3.8%	45%	44%	11% (Note: "Someone else" with 2%; Undecided with 9%)
Brilliant Corners Research & Strategies (D)	September 21–24, 2020	608 (LV)	± 4%	43%	45%	13% (Note: Bledsoe (C) with 5%; "Other" with 1%; Undecided with 7%)
Morning Consult	September 11–20, 2020	764 (LV)	± (3% – 4%)	46% (Note: Overlapping sample with the previous Morning Consult poll, but more information available regarding sample size)	45%	9%
Morning Consult	September 8–17, 2020	782 (LV) (Note: Additional data sourced from FiveThirtyEight)	± (2% – 4%)	45%	46%	–
Quinnipiac University	September 10–14, 2020	969 (LV)	± 3.2%	48%	48%	3%
Morning Consult	September 2–11, 2020	~764 (LV)	± (3%–4%)	44%	46%	–
Morning Consult	August 23 – September 1, 2020	~764 (LV)	± (3%–4%)	46%	43%	–
Morning Consult	August 13–22, 2020	~764 (LV)	± (3%–4%)	45%	42%	–
Morning Consult	August 3–12, 2020	~764 (LV)	± (3%–4%)	45%	45%	–
Quinnipiac University	July 30 – August 3, 2020	914 (RV)	± 3.2%	44%	44%	12% (Note: Undecided with 2%; would not vote with 1%; Undecided with 9%)
Morning Consult	July 24 – August 2, 2020	741 (LV)	± 4.0%	44% (Note: Overlapping sample with the previous Morning Consult poll, but more information available regarding sample size and topline numbers)	43%	12% (Note: "Someone else" with 4%; Undecided with 8%)
Morning Consult	July 23 – August 1, 2020	~764 (LV)	± (3%–4%)	44%	43%	–
Public Policy Polling (D) (Note: This poll's sponsor, Giffords, had endorsed Harrison prior to the sampling period)	July 30–31, 2020	1,117 (V)	± 3.0%	47%	44%	8% (Note: Undecided with 8%)
Morning Consult	July 13–22, 2020	~764 (LV)	± (3%–4%)	46%	42%	–
ALG Research (D)	July 15–20, 2020	591 (LV)	–	49%	45%	6% (Note: "Other" with 1%; Undecided with 5%)
Brilliant Corners Research & Strategies (D)	July 13–19, 2020	800 (LV)	± 3.5%	43%	41%	16% (Note: Dunham (L) with 4%; Bledsoe (C) with 3%; Other with 1%; Undecided with 8%)
Gravis Marketing	July 17, 2020	604 (LV)	± 4.0%	48%	41%	10%
Civiqs/Daily Kos	May 23–26, 2020	591 (RV)	± 4.5%	42%	42%	16% (Note: "Someone else" with 10%; Undecided with 6%)
Brilliant Corners Research & Strategies (D)	March 3–11, 2020	804 (LV)	± 3.8%	47%	43%	9%
NBC News/Marist	February 18–21, 2020	2,382 (RV)	± 2.6%	54%	37%	9%
East Carolina University	January 31 – February 2, 2020	1,756 (RV)	± 2.7%	51%	38%	11%
Change Research	December 6–11, 2019	998 (LV)	± 3.1%	47%	45%	9%
Benchmark Research (R) (Note: Poll sponsor is a Security in Strength PAC, a super PAC that supported Lindsey Graham during this poll's sampling period.)	October 15–21, 2019	450 (RV)	± 4.2%	53%	30%	18%
Change Research (D) (Note: Poll sponsor, Collective PAC, had endorsed Harrison prior to this poll's sampling period.)	September 17–21, 2019	809 (LV)	± 3.4%	50%	43%	7%
Change Research	June 11–14, 2019	2,312 (RV)	± 2.0%	52%	35%	13%
WPA Intelligence (R) (Note: Poll sponsored by Conservatives for Clean Energy)	March 11–13, 2019	500 (LV)	± 4.4%	55%	32%	12%

Hypothetical polling

with generic Democrat

Poll source	Date(s) administered	Sample size	Margin of error	Lindsey Graham (R)	Generic Democrat	Other / Undecided
Change Research	June 11–14, 2019	2,312 (RV)	± 2.0%	51%	36%	12%

on whether Lindsey Graham deserves to be re-elected

Poll source	Date(s) administered	Sample size	Margin of error	Yes	No	Other / Undecided
Change Research/Post and Courier	December 6–11, 2019	998 (LV) (Note: Likely primary voters)	± 3.1%	37%	53%	10%
Emerson College	Feb 28 – March 2, 2019	755 (RV)	± 3.5%	47%	52%	1%

with Generic Republican and Generic Democrat

Poll source	Date(s) administered	Sample size	Margin of error	Generic Republican	Generic Democrat	Other / Undecided
Quinnipiac University	September 23–27, 2020	1,123 (LV)	± 2.9%	49%	44%	6% (Note: Undecided with 6%)
Quinnipiac University	September 10–14, 2020	969 (LV)	± 3.2%	52%	44%	5% (Note: Undecided with 5%)

=== Fundraising ===
In the first quarter of 2020, Harrison outraised Graham, $7.3 million to $5.5 million, but Graham had the lead in cash on hand, with $12 million compared with Harrison's $8 million.

In the third quarter of 2020, Harrison raised $57 million, the largest quarterly total by a US Senate candidate ever, breaking Beto O'Rourke's record in the 2018 Texas election. He had also raised the most ever by a US Senate candidate, beating another of O'Rourke's records.

Campaign finance reports as of December 31, 2020
Candidate	Raised	Spent	Cash on hand
Lindsey Graham (R)	$112,292,175	$102,195,708	$12,491,457
Jaime Harrison (D)	$132,685,669	$132,350,242	$335,426
Source: Federal Election Commission

=== Debates ===
2020 United States senate election in South Carolina debates
No.	Date & Time	Host	Location	Moderator	Participants	
Key: P Participant. N Non-invitee.					Republican	Democratic
Key: P Participant. N Non-invitee.					United States senator Lindsey Graham	Former SCDP chairman Jaime Harrison
1	October 3, 2020; 8:00 p.m. EDT	Allen University	Columbia, South Carolina	Judi Gatson	P	P

=== Results ===
United States Senate election in South Carolina, 2020
Party	Candidate	Votes	%	±%
Republican	Lindsey Graham (incumbent)	1,369,137	54.44%	+0.17%
Democratic	Jaime Harrison	1,110,828	44.17%	+5.39%
Constitution	Bill Bledsoe	32,845	1.30%	N/A
Write-in		2,294	0.09%	-0.29%
Total votes		2,515,104	100.00%	
Republican hold				

==== By county ====
By county

County	Lindsey Graham Republican		Jaime Harrison Democratic		Bill Bledsoe Constitution		Write-in		Margin		Total votes
County	#	%	#	%	#	%	#	%	#	%	Total votes
Abbeville	8,025	64.46	4,232	33.99	182	1.46	11	0.09	3,793	30.47	12,450
Aiken	51,080	59.92	32,829	38.51	1,255	1.47	79	0.09	18,251	21.41	85,243
Allendale	833	22.97	2,773	76.45	19	0.52	2	0.06	-1,940	-53.49	3,627
Anderson	66,655	69.34	28,075	29.20	1,305	1.36	98	0.10	38,580	40.13	96,133
Bamberg	2,373	36.63	4,060	62.66	44	0.68	2	0.03	-1,687	-26.04	6,479
Barnwell	5,378	52.11	4,806	46.57	128	1.24	8	0.08	572	5.54	10,320
Beaufort	53,575	54.68	43,489	44.39	851	0.87	62	0.06	10,086	10.29	97,977
Berkeley	56,358	53.94	46,233	44.25	1,800	1.72	95	0.09	10,125	9.69	104,486
Calhoun	4,201	50.59	3,975	47.87	123	1.48	5	0.06	226	2.72	8,304
Charleston	95,401	43.50	121,517	55.41	2,196	1.00	183	0.08	-26,116	-11.91	219,297
Cherokee	17,481	69.24	7,265	28.78	485	1.92	16	0.06	10,216	40.46	25,247
Chester	8,247	52.36	7,225	45.87	270	1.71	8	0.05	1,022	6.49	15,750
Chesterfield	10,878	57.63	7,706	40.83	275	1.46	15	0.08	3,172	16.81	18,874
Clarendon	8,141	48.67	8,391	50.16	172	1.03	23	0.14	-250	-1.49	16,727
Colleton	10,068	52.18	8,839	45.81	364	1.89	22	0.11	1,229	6.37	19,293
Darlington	16,456	50.72	15,563	47.97	395	1.22	32	0.10	893	2.75	32,446
Dillon	6,297	48.08	6,663	50.88	130	0.99	6	0.05	-366	-2.79	13,096
Dorchester	41,178	53.31	34,616	44.82	1,345	1.74	99	0.13	6,562	8.50	77,238
Edgefield	7,988	59.98	5,104	38.33	217	1.63	8	0.06	2,884	21.66	13,317
Fairfield	4,556	37.53	7,463	61.48	115	0.95	5	0.04	-2,907	-23.95	12,139
Florence	32,217	49.83	31,748	49.11	650	1.01	36	0.06	469	0.72	64,651
Georgetown	20,495	55.81	15,867	43.21	340	0.93	22	0.06	4,628	12.60	36,724
Greenville	149,991	58.04	104,980	40.63	3,116	1.21	319	0.12	45,011	17.42	258,406
Greenwood	19,017	59.37	12,504	39.03	466	1.45	46	0.14	6,513	20.33	32,033
Hampton	3,755	40.37	5,459	58.69	82	0.88	5	0.05	-1,704	-18.32	9,301
Horry	116,512	64.86	60,530	33.69	2,471	1.38	131	0.07	55,982	31.16	179,644
Jasper	6,939	48.13	7,302	50.65	170	1.18	5	0.03	-363	-2.52	14,416
Kershaw	20,104	59.77	12,904	38.37	581	1.73	45	0.13	7,200	21.41	33,634
Lancaster	29,572	59.32	19,523	39.16	717	1.44	37	0.07	10,049	20.16	49,849
Laurens	19,486	63.87	10,498	34.41	487	1.60	37	0.12	8,988	29.46	30,508
Lee	2,939	34.83	5,426	64.30	70	0.83	3	0.04	-2,487	-29.47	8,438
Lexington	91,944	63.55	50,256	34.74	2,349	1.62	132	0.09	41,688	28.81	144,681
Marion	5,562	37.76	9,034	61.34	121	0.82	11	0.07	-3,472	-23.57	14,278
Marlboro	4,775	41.66	6,504	56.74	169	1.47	14	0.12	-1,729	-15.08	11,462
McCormick	2,933	51.23	2,746	47.97	41	0.72	5	0.09	187	3.27	5,725
Newberry	11,239	60.34	7,094	38.09	277	1.49	16	0.09	4,145	22.25	18,626
Oconee	29,454	72.37	10,576	25.99	633	1.56	34	0.08	18,878	46.39	40,697
Orangeburg	13,221	32.04	27,720	67.19	299	0.72	19	0.05	-14,499	-35.14	41,259
Pickens	42,505	73.87	14,066	24.44	900	1.56	71	0.12	28,439	49.42	57,542
Richland	58,894	30.33	133,642	68.82	1,509	0.78	142	0.07	-74,748	-38.49	194,187
Saluda	6,107	65.77	3,023	32.55	149	1.60	7	0.08	3,084	33.21	9,286
Spartanburg	91,594	61.62	54,475	36.65	2,385	1.60	197	0.13	37,119	24.97	148,651
Sumter	20,524	41.92	27,791	56.76	604	1.23	41	0.08	-7,267	-14.84	48,960
Union	7,868	59.44	5,105	38.57	249	1.88	15	0.11	2,763	20.87	13,237
Williamsburg	5,409	33.77	10,493	65.51	107	0.67	9	0.06	-5,084	-31.74	16,018
York	80,912	56.19	60,738	42.18	2,232	1.55	116	0.08	20,174	14.01	143,998
Totals	1,369,137	54.44	1,110,828	44.17	32,845	1.30	2,294	0.09	258,309	10.27	2,515,104

Counties that flipped from Democratic to Republican

- Barnwell (largest municipality: Barnwell)
- Calhoun (largest municipality: St. Matthews)
- Darlington (largest municipality: Hartsville)

County that flipped from Republican to Democratic

- Charleston (largest municipality: Charleston)

==== By congressional district ====
Graham won six of seven congressional districts.

District	Graham	Harrison	Representative
1st	52%	46%	Joe Cunningham
1st	52%	46%	Nancy Mace
2nd	55%	44%	Joe Wilson
3rd	67%	31%	Jeff Duncan
4th	59%	40%	William Timmons
5th	56%	42%	Ralph Norman
6th	31%	68%	Jim Clyburn
7th	58%	41%	Tom Rice

== See also ==
- 2020 South Carolina elections

== Notes ==
Partisan clients

Voter samples
