= Sucker Free =

- The opening logo of the series
- Also known as: Direct Effect
- Starring: DJ Envy
- Country of origin: United States

Production
- Producers: Theron "Tee Smif" Smith & Derek Jones
- Running time: Weekdays 6:30AM, Sundays 11AM-1PM and 11PM-1AM

Original release
- Network: MTV/MTV2
- Release: May 29, 2006 – October 21, 2012

Sucker Free, known as Sucker Free Daily on weekdays and then Sucker Free Countdown on Sundays, was a former hip-hop video block on MTV2. Previously, Sucker Free aired weekdays for one hour, then eventually sporadically until the week leading to February 28, 2010. Sucker Free Countdown, its 2-hour top 15 countdown, aired Sundays at 11 am ET/PT and 11 pm ET/PT. Sucker Free originated from a block branding of hip-hop videos on MTV2 Sundays called Sucker Free Sundays in 2002, and eventually became the branding of MTV's main hip-hop program weekdays from 2006 until 2008. In October 2012, the show was relaunched as The Week in Jams.

== History ==
Sucker Free debuted on May 29, 2006. Its previous moniker, Direct Effect, debuted on September 25, 2000, and was more robust in comparison to Sucker Free. From its start, it was marketed and produced almost like a hip-hop version of TRL. However, as the network drifted away from music and began to promote general pseudo-reality programming to teens in afternoons rather than video-branded programming, the series became a pre-taped program consisting mostly of videos and some viewer interaction, and the time slot was pushed back to early A.M. hours (first 10 am, then 8 am, then as early as 6:30 am) before the program's end in 2008.

A limited archive of Sucker Free Countdown can be seen on Sucker Free's website on MTV2.com

In April 2008, the show became a subject of criticism by the Parents Television Council, whose research report The Rap on Rap claimed that Sucker Free and BET programs 106 & Park and Rap City were deliberately marketing adult content to minors. In response to the PTC's report, Procter & Gamble proposed withdrawing advertising from BET and MTV. An executive for MTV responded:

This report unfairly and inaccurately paints MTV with a brush of irresponsibility. During the time outlined in this report we did not receive a single complaint about the content of the videos. We take our responsibility to our viewers very seriously. And have a self-imposed standards group that looks at every video and appropriately rates all of our programming.

== Spin off ==
Sucker Free Latino debuted in 2006 on the Latino-oriented MTV network MTV Tres, which focuses mainly on Latino urban music. In 2009, the show was cut of its host and other familiar elements and aired as a top 5 countdown known as SFL 5. SFL 5 ran Tuesdays at 10 pm ET/PT.

When MTV Tres re-launched in 2010 as tr3s, SFL5 was not included in the new programming line-up and effectively cancelled.
