= Jaime Harrison =

American attorney and politician (born 1976)

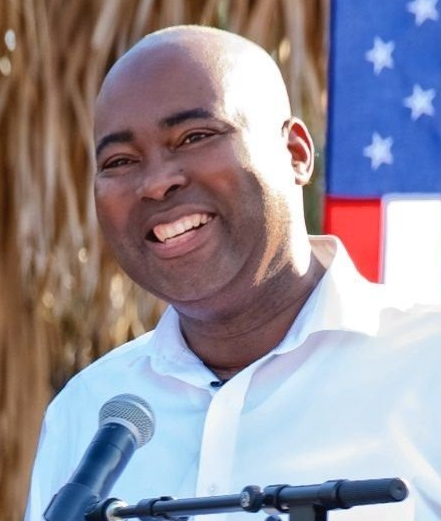
- Harrison in 2019

Chair of the Democratic National Committee
- In office January 21, 2021 – February 1, 2025
- Preceded by: Tom Perez
- Succeeded by: Ken Martin

Chair of the South Carolina Democratic Party
- In office May 4, 2013 – April 29, 2017
- Preceded by: Dick Harpootlian
- Succeeded by: Trav Robertson

Personal details
- Born: February 5, 1976 (age 50) Orangeburg, South Carolina, U.S.
- Party: Democratic
- Spouse: Marie Boyd
- Children: 2
- Education: Yale University (BA); Georgetown University (JD)
- Website: Campaign website

Jaime Ricardo Harrison (/ˈdʒeɪmi/ JAY-mee; born February 5, 1976) is an American lawyer and politician who served as the chair of the Democratic National Committee from 2021 to 2025. He was chair of the South Carolina Democratic Party from 2013 to 2017. Harrison ran against Senator Lindsey Graham in the 2020 United States Senate election in South Carolina; he was defeated by ten points.

Born and raised in South Carolina, Harrison graduated from Yale University and then headed a non-profit that assisted low income students in career readiness. He earned his Juris Doctor degree from Georgetown University Law Center. Harrison worked for South Carolina congressman Jim Clyburn and became staff director for the House Democratic Caucus. He then worked as a lobbyist for the Podesta Group, before being selected to chair the South Carolina Democratic Party. In January 2021, Joe Biden nominated Harrison as chair of the National Democratic Party, for which he was subsequently elected.

Following the Democratic Party's loss to the Republicans in the 2024 United States presidential election, along with other defeats, Harrison announced that he would not seek a second term as chair of the party in 2025.

== Early life and education ==
Harrison was born and raised in Orangeburg, South Carolina. He was raised by his mother, Patricia Harrison, and his grandparents. He attended a Baptist church in his youth. In 1994, he was selected for the United States Senate Youth Program. He attended Orangeburg-Wilkinson High School and received a scholarship to Yale University, where he majored in political science.

After graduating from Yale in 1998, Harrison worked as a teacher for a year at his former high school. In 1999, he was appointed chief operating officer of College Summit, a non-profit organization that helps low-income youth find a path to college and a career. He earned his Juris Doctor from Georgetown University Law Center in 2004.

== Career ==
After leaving College Summit, Harrison became involved in politics, working for Jim Clyburn as his director of floor operations while Clyburn was the Majority Whip of the United States House of Representatives. Harrison went on to serve as executive director of the House Democratic Caucus and the vice chair of the South Carolina Democratic Party. He later served as a lobbyist for the Podesta Group. His clients at the Podesta Group included banks, such as Bank of America and Wells Fargo, Berkshire Hathaway, pharmaceutical companies, casinos, the American Coalition for Clean Coal Electricity, and Walmart, among others. In addition to lobbying work at Podesta Group, he has also lobbied on behalf of United Way Worldwide and the Association of Public and Land-grant Universities.

In May 2013, Harrison became the chair of the South Carolina Democratic Party. He is the first African American to have served in this role.

In 2018, Harrison published the book Climbing the Hill: How to Build a Career in Politics and Make a Difference, with journalist Amos Snead.

=== Democratic National Committee ===
Harrison declared his candidacy for chairperson of the Democratic National Committee (DNC) in the February 2017 election. He defended his eight-year record at the Podesta Group, saying, "It's how I pay back the $160,000 of student loan debt." Harrison ended his bid for DNC chair on February 23, 2017, and endorsed Tom Perez.

Harrison accepted a position as associate chairman and counselor of the DNC, where he implemented a program called "Every ZIP Code Counts." The program supplied each state party with $10,000 per month so long as the state party did an analysis of its strengths and weaknesses for its internal operations.

Following President Joe Biden's victory in the 2020 presidential election, Harrison was nominated by Biden to be the chair of the DNC, succeeding Tom Perez. DNC members elected him on January 21, 2021.

After the loss of Vice President and Democratic nominee Kamala Harris and running mate Minnesota governor Tim Walz in the 2024 United States presidential election, news outlets reported that Harrison did not plan to run for another term for DNC Chair in 2025. During Harrison's tenure as chair of the DNC, the Democratic Party had a net loss of three seats in the United States Senate (out of 100), seven seats in the House of Representatives (out of 435), and the presidency. The congressional losses were modest, but Democrats were voted out after just one presidential term.

== 2020 U.S. Senate election ==
Harrison filed paperwork on February 7, 2019, to challenge Senator Lindsey Graham by running for his seat in the U.S. Senate in the 2020 election. No Democrat has won a statewide election in South Carolina since 2006. Harrison launched his campaign on May 29, 2019. Economist and Democrat Gloria Bromell Tinubu also announced her run for the seat in May 2019, however in January 2020, she dropped out of the race, and endorsed Harrison. With Harrison unopposed, the Democratic primary for US Senate was cancelled, and he became the Democratic nominee on June 9, 2020.

Harrison and Graham participated in a debate with no audience (due to COVID-19 pandemic restrictions) which was hosted at Allen University on October 3, 2020. A second debate originally scheduled for October 9 was changed to feature separate, televised interviews after Graham refused to be tested for COVID-19 preceding the scheduled debate.

In the third quarter of 2020, Harrison raised $57 million, the largest ever quarterly total raised by a U.S. Senate candidate, breaking Beto O'Rourke's record in the 2018 Texas Senate election. This record was later broken by James Talarico in the 2026 Texas Senate Election. He raised the most ever by a U.S. Senate candidate at the time, beating another record set by O'Rourke.

Harrison called for expansion of Medicaid and expanded coronavirus relief. During the 2020 Senate election, Harrison criticized Graham for attempting to repeal the Affordable Care Act. Harrison also supports the legalization of cannabis.

Harrison lost the election to Graham by over ten percentage points, garnering 44.2% of the vote compared to Graham's 54.5%. The day after the election, Niall Stanage of The Hill stated that Harrison ran a spirited challenge but in the end, Graham "prevailed easily".

Harrison broke U.S. Senate campaign fundraising records by raising $109 million. His campaign was also the topic of the 2024 documentary In the Bubble with Jaime.

=== Electoral history ===
2020 United States Senate election in South Carolina
Party	Candidate	Votes	%	±%
Republican	Lindsey Graham (incumbent)	1,369,137	54.44%	+0.17%
Democratic	Jaime Harrison	1,110,828	44.17%	+5.39%
Constitution	Bill Bledsoe	32,845	1.30%	N/A
Write-in		2,294	0.09%	-0.29%
Total votes		2,515,104	100.00%	
Republican hold		Swing		

== Personal life ==
Despite their political rivalry, Harrison is friends with Matt Moore, a former chairman of the South Carolina Republican Party. The two co-taught a course at the University of South Carolina during the fall semester of 2015.

Harrison met his wife, Marie Boyd, when they worked in Washington, D.C., shortly after the 2008 United States presidential election. She is a law professor at the University of South Carolina School of Law. They live in Columbia, South Carolina, with their two sons.

== See also ==
- List of African-American United States Senate candidates
- Democratic Party (United States)

Party political offices
Preceded by Dick Harpootlian	Chair of the South Carolina Democratic Party; 2013–2017	Succeeded by Trav Robertson
Preceded by Brad Hutto	Democratic nominee for U.S. Senator from South Carolina (Class 2); 2020	Succeeded by Annie Andrews
Preceded by Tom Perez	Chair of the Democratic National Committee; 2021–2025	Succeeded by Ken Martin
