= The Breakfast Club (radio show) =

American radio show

- Genre: Talk, hip-hop, politics
- Running time: 4 hours (Monday–Saturday)
- Country of origin: United States
- Home station: WWPR-FM Power 105.1 (New York City)
- Syndicates: Premiere Networks
- TV adaptations: Simulcast on Tubi
- Starring: DJ Envy; Charlamagne tha God; Jess Hilarious; Loren LoRosa
- Produced by: Eddie F
- Original release: New York version: December 2010; Nationally syndicated version: August 2013
- Opening theme: "Smells Like Teen Spirit" performed by Nirvana
- Website: BreakfastClubOnLine.com

The Breakfast Club is an American syndicated radio show based in New York City. It is hosted by DJ Envy, Charlamagne tha God, Jess Hilarious, and Loren LoRosa. The Breakfast Club's flagship station is WWPR-FM Power 105.1 and it currently airs in over 90 radio markets around the U.S., including Chicago, Houston, Atlanta, Minneapolis and Miami.

Common topics of discussion on the show are celebrity gossip (especially in the hip hop industry), American politics, as well as sexual and dating issues. The program is broadcast live on weekdays from 6 to 10 am Eastern Time, with a recorded Saturday morning version.

== History ==
In December 2010, The Breakfast Club was established on urban contemporary station WWPR-FM as a morning drive radio show serving the New York City market.

In April 2013, Premiere Networks (a subsidiary of then Clear Channel Communications, now iHeartMedia) launched a weekend version of the show, Weekends with the Breakfast Club, as a Top 20 Countdown of urban contemporary hits. 4 months later, The Breakfast Club, as a weekday offering, was rolled out into syndication.

Based on the show's popularity, cameras were installed in the New York studio from where the show is broadcast. From March 2014 until November 2021, The Breakfast Club was simulcast on television on Revolt.

In January 2020, The Breakfast Club was nominated for an NAACP Image Award in the category of Outstanding News/Information (Series or Special).

In July 2020, The Breakfast Club was nominated for induction into the Radio Hall of Fame. Talk radio industry magazine Talkers included it in its 2020 "Heavy Hundred" list of top 100 influential talk radio shows, calling the show "appointment listening every day for people of color." During the aftermath of the George Floyd protests, the Los Angeles Times called it "a radio forum for the nation’s racial reckoning." As of July 2020, the show reach 8 million listeners a month according to Nielsen.

In August 2020, The Breakfast Club was inducted into the Radio Hall of Fame.

Angela Yee announced her departure from the show on August 10, 2022, to start her own radio show. Way Up with Angela Yee began airing on February 6, 2023. Comedian Jess Hilarious became a permanent co-host of The Breakfast Club on February 5, 2024. The show began streaming on Netflix in June 2026, becoming the platform's first daily live show.
