= DJ Envy =

American disc jockey and radio personality

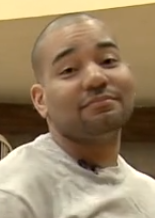
- DJ Envy in 2014

Background information
- Born: September 3, 1977 (age 49); New York City, U.S.
- Genres: Hip hop, R&B
- Occupations: Disc jockey; record producer; radio personality
- Years active: 1994–present
- Labels: Desert Storm; Koch

RaaShaun Casey (born September 3, 1977), known professionally as DJ Envy, is an American disc jockey (DJ), record producer, and radio personality. He is one of the three hosts of the syndicated radio show The Breakfast Club, alongside Charlamagne tha God, on Power 105.1.

== Early life ==
Casey graduated from Hampton University in 1999 with a degree in business management.

== Career ==
A native of Queens, New York City, DJ Envy, then called DJ Shrimp, was tutored and mentored by neighborhood acquaintance DJ Clue, who introduced him to the mixtape circuit in the mid-1990s. By the early 2000s, he was hosting commercials and exclusives for other established artists that include Hahflamez, Jay-Z, 50 Cent, and The Lox. He then was signed to DJ Clue's record label Desert Storm. In 2003, he released his debut studio album entitled The Desert Storm Mixtape: Blok Party, Vol. 1.

DJ Envy began mixing once a month for Hot 97 show, "Takin' it to the Streets", hosted by Angie Martinez from 12 am to 4 am, but later filled in when Martinez became pregnant. He then co-hosted Hot 97's morning show with Miss Jones from 6 am to 10 am daily. His run on the morning show ended in July 2008 when Miss Jones moved to Philadelphia, Pennsylvania. DJ Envy spun on his own mix shows on Hot 97 called "The People's Mix" on Saturdays from 12 pm to 2 pm and "The People's Choice Hit List" on Sundays from 5 pm to 8 pm. He had a segment on Hot 97 titled "New at 2", where he played the newest hits from 2 pm to 2:30 pm. He previously hosted his own midday show on Power 105, before joining Charlamagne tha God and Angela Yee as co-hosts of The Breakfast Club. As of 2023, he hosts a weekly show on SiriusXM Radio's Hip-Hop Nation.

On Monday, December 6, 2010, DJ Envy, Angela Yee, and Charlamagne tha God began hosting the morning show on Power 105 as The Breakfast Club. In September 2016, he voiced support for stop-and-frisk and later apologized after constant criticism.

DJ Envy has made appearances on Juelz Santana's and Lloyd Banks's music video "Beamer Benz or Bentley" and various television shows, such as 106 & Park, Entourage, and Tha Corner, which he hosts on the Music Choice channel. He appeared in the 2006 film Blood of a Champion as Shadow's enemy friend. He also appeared in documentary, The Raw Report: Gucci Mane. On March 21, 2010, DJ Envy took over as VJ of MTV2's Sucker Free Countdown.

In early 2015, DJ Envy released single "Still A Fan", featuring recording artist, songwriter, and producer "Rico Love." In early 2017, DJ Envy and his wife, Gia Casey, began hosting a podcast named The Casey Crew that "explores the good, bad, ugly, and beauty of relationships and family". DJ Envy and his wife, Gia Casey, released a book, titled Real Life, Real Love: Life Lessons on Joy, Pain, and the Magic That Holds Us Together on April 19, 2022.

A car enthusiast, DJ Envy is the founder and curator of the Drive your Dreams Car Show auto show, which was first held on November 3, 2018, at Meadowlands Exposition Center in Secaucus, New Jersey. The second annual event took place on September 7, 2019, at the same venue. Both were sponsored by Lincoln Tech. After the COVID-19 pandemic canceled events in 2020, the show returned in 2021, traveling to Atlantic City, New Jersey, Atlanta, Georgia, and Detroit, Michigan. Approximately 5,000 people showed up at the TCF Center to see specialty cars owned by celebrities and Detroit residents.

Prior to naming the show the Drive your Dreams Car Show, DJ Envy dubbed his car show as "Carchella". Following a legal notice from Coachella threatening a lawsuit, and a preliminary injunction and restraining order approved by the presiding judge, DJ Envy ceased using the name "Charchella" and reintroduced his car show under its name.

"I try to take the car shows to markets I'm already successful in, so we started in the New York/New Jersey area, then we went out to Atlanta, we went to Atlantic City, Philly. … Now we're in Detroit, and next month (December 2021) is a holiday show in Miami, Florida". Autos owned by other celebrities are also featured in the exhibition, including cars courtesy of 50 Cent, Fabolous, Icewear Vezzo, 42 Dugg, and Detroit's Royce da 5'9" and Richard Wershe Jr.(White Boy Rick).

== Awards and recognition ==
On January 24, 2020, Mayor Marty Small of Atlantic City, New Jersey, officially declared January 23 as "Breakfast Club Day" in Atlantic City. DJ Envy was separately presented with an official Key to the City of Atlantic City for his "outstanding efforts to market and promote Atlantic City."

In August 2020, DJ Envy and his Breakfast Club co-hosts, Angela Yee and Charlamagne tha God were inducted into the Radio Hall of Fame.

== Real Estate Fraud Controversy ==
In October 2023, the US District Attorney's office in New Jersey filed a criminal fraud complaint against Cesar Pina, a business associate of DJ Envy. The charging document makes reference to a 'radio personality' connected to the criminal enterprise that helped garner publicity for Pina to a broader audience. A civil suit has also been filed against DJ Envy in connection to the real estate operations associated with 'Flipping NJ' (Cesar Pina), Flip2Dao and other commercial ventures involving Pina.

Cesar Pina was charged with one count of wire fraud and released on a $1 million secured bond with electronic monitoring. Regarding DJ Envy's involvement, Pina said: "DJ Envy has nothing to do with any of these 20 lawsuits of these people who are suing me." Envy is however claimed to have helped Pina in reaching the audience he scammed through joint seminars. Envy responded by saying he did the seminars in order to "uplift the community", and that he had no idea of Pina's criminal acivity. As of 2025, DJ Envy faces no charges.

== Personal life ==
Casey is married to Gia Casey, who is of Chinese-Jamaican heritage. DJ Envy and his wife have been married since the early 2000s. They are parents to six children. They often talk about the challenges they have faced throughout their marriage.

In 2022, the couple made headlines after sitting down for an interview where they openly talked about their sex life. Gia revealed that for the first 10 years of their married life, she had faked orgasms. Upon hearing this, DJ Envy became tense, but what they discovered was that after having open talks about the situation, they grew closer together. Along with many reasons, this is one of the reasons they credit their successful marriage to.

This story later sparked conversations about emotional intimacy in long-term relationships and how the truth can lead to a stronger connection between a couple. This was later also highlighted in *Men’s Health* magazine.

He is a resident of Kinnelon, New Jersey.

== Discography ==
=== Studio albums ===
- The Desert Storm Mixtape: Blok Party, Vol. 1 (2003)
- The Co-Op (with Red Café) (2007)

=== Independent albums ===
- It's Moovin' (2009)
- Love and Envy (2011)
- One Love with the Homo's (2011)
- Audio Uprising, Vol. 1 (2011)
- Full Breach. Vol. 5 (2014)
- F2D Presents Hall of Fame 2 (with DA L.E.S. & DJ D Double D) (2018)
- Just A Kid From Queens (2018)

=== Production ===
- "Feel the Hate" – The Murderers (2000)
- "Broken Silence" – Foxy Brown (2001)
- "The Bad Guy" (featuring Pain in da Ass) – Fabolous (2001)
- "Right/Wrong" (Cradle 2 the Grave OST) – DMX (2003)
- "Getting Down" (Cradle 2 the Grave OST) – DMX, Kashmir, Bazaar Royale (2003)
- "Wait a Minute" – Joe Budden (2004)
