= History of chiropractic =

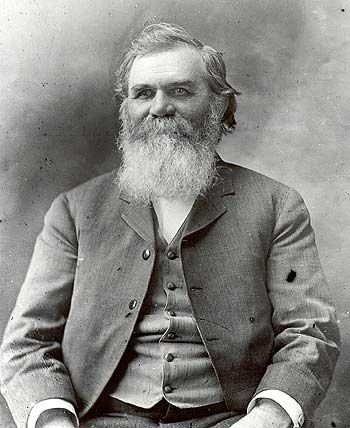
D. D. Palmer

The history of chiropractic began in 1895 when Daniel David Palmer of Iowa performed the first chiropractic adjustment on a partially deaf janitor, William Harvey Lillard. While Lillard was working without his shirt on in Palmer's office, Lillard bent over to empty the trash can. Palmer noticed that Lillard had a vertebra out of position. He asked Lillard what happened, and Lillard replied, "I moved the wrong way, and I heard a 'pop' in my back, and that's when I lost my hearing." Palmer, who was also involved in many other natural healing philosophies, had Lillard lie face down on the floor and proceeded with the adjustment. The next day, Lillard told Palmer, "I can hear that rackets on the streets." This experience led Palmer to open a school of chiropractic two years later. Rev. Samuel H. Weed coined the word "chiropractic" by combining the Greek words cheiro (hand) and praktikos (doing or action).

Chiropractic's early philosophy was rooted in vitalism, naturalism, magnetism, spiritualism and other constructs that are not amenable to the scientific method, although Palmer tried to merge science and metaphysics. In 1896, Palmer's first descriptions and underlying philosophy of chiropractic echoed Andrew Still's principles of osteopathy established a decade earlier. Both described the body as a "machine" whose parts could be manipulated to produce a drugless cure. Both professed the use of spinal manipulation on joint dysfunction/subluxation to improve health. Palmer distinguished his work by noting that he was the first to use short-lever HVLA (high velocity low amplitude) joint manipulation techniques using the spinous process and transverse processes as mechanical levers. He described the effects of chiropractic spinal manipulation as being mediated primarily by the nervous system.

As an active spiritist, D. D. Palmer said he "received chiropractic from the other world" from a deceased physician named Dr. Jim Atkinson.

Despite the similarities between chiropractic and osteopathy, the latter's practitioners sought to differentiate themselves by seeking licensure to regulate the profession, calling chiropractic a "bastardized form of osteopathy". In 1907 in a test of the new osteopathy law, a Wisconsin-based chiropractor was charged with practicing osteopathic medicine without a license. Practicing medicine without a license led to many chiropractors, including D.D. Palmer, being jailed. Ironically, Palmer's legal defence of chiropractic consisted of the first chiropractic textbook Modernized Chiropractic published in 1906, written by "mixer" chiropractors Longworthy, Smith, et al., whom Palmer despised. Although the chiropractors won their first test case in Wisconsin in 1907, prosecutions instigated by state medical boards became increasingly common and in many cases they were successful. In response, chiropractors conducted political campaigns to secure separate licensing statutes, eventually succeeding in all fifty states, from Kansas in 1913 to Louisiana in 1974.

Division within the profession has been intense, with "mixers" combining spinal adjustments with other treatments, and "straights" relying solely on spinal adjustments. A conference sponsored by the National Institutes of Health in 1975 spurred the development of chiropractic research. The American Medical Association called chiropractic an "unscientific cult" and boycotted it until losing a 1987 antitrust case. For most of its existence, chiropractic has battled with mainstream medicine, sustained by antiscientific and pseudoscientific ideas such as vertebral subluxation. By the mid-1990s there was a growing scholarly interest in chiropractic.

== Manual therapy predating Chiropractic ==
The practice of joint manipulation dates back to ancient times and has roots in most countries. The earliest known medical text, the Edwin Smith papyrus of 1552 BC, describes the Ancient Egyptian treatment of bone-related injuries. These early bone-setters would treat fractures with wooden splints wrapped in bandages or made a cast around the injury out of a plaster-like mixture. It is not known whether they performed amputations as well. With the advancement of modern medicine beginning in the 18th century, bone-setters began to be recognised for their efficiency in treatment but did not receive the praise or status that physicians did. Some of these self-taught healers were considered legitimate, while others were perceived as "quacks". In Great Britain, one of the most famous was the bone-setter Sally Mapp (d. 1737). Known as "Crazy Sally", she learned her skill from her father and was known for her arm strength and ability to reset almost any bone. Though she lacked the medical education of physicians, she successfully treated dislocated shoulders and knees, among other treatments, at the Grecian Coffee House in London and in the town of Epsom. Bone-setters treated the majority of the population since they were cheaper than licensed physicians. Royal families would employ bone-setters when the court physicians were inadequate or inefficient.

=== Early Osteopathy ===
The practice of osteopathy began in the United States in 1874. Osteopathy was founded by Andrew Taylor Still, a 19th-century American physician (MD), Civil War surgeon, and Kansas state and territorial legislator. The osteopathic physicians—those who are now referred to as DO's—argued that the non-osteopathic physicians had an overly mechanistic approach to treating patients, treated the symptoms of disease instead of the original causes, and were blind to the harm they were causing their patients. Other practitioners had a similar argument, labeling osteopathic medicine as unfounded, passive, and dangerous to a disease-afflicted patient. This was the medical environment that pervaded throughout the 19th century, and the setting Still entered when he began developing his idea of osteopathy.

After experiencing the loss of his wife and three daughters to spinal meningitis and noting that the current orthodox medical system could not save them, Still may have been prompted to shape his reformist attitudes towards conventional medicine. Still set out to reform the orthodox medical scene and establish a practice that did not so readily resort to drugs, purgatives, and harshly invasive therapeutics to treat a person suffering from ailment. Thought to have been influenced by spiritualist figures such as Andrew Jackson Davis and ideas of magnetic and electrical healing, Still began practicing manual therapy procedures that intended to restore harmony in the body. Over the course of the next twenty five years, Still attracted support for his medical philosophy that disapproved of orthodox medicine, and shaped his philosophy for osteopathy. Components included the idea that structure and function are interrelated and the importance of each piece of the body in the harmonious function of its whole.

Still established the American School of Osteopathy on 20 May 1892, in Kirksville, Missouri, with twenty-one students in the first class. He named his new school of medicine "osteopathy", reasoning that "the bone, osteon, was the starting point from which [he] was to ascertain the cause of pathological conditions". He would eventually claim that he could "shake a child and stop scarlet fever, croup, diphtheria, and cure whooping cough in three days by a wring of its neck."

== 1890s ==
In 1895, the world was in the Second Industrial Revolution, marked by innovation and creativity. Health care had emerged from the practice of heroic medicine. All varieties of treatments and cures including scientific medicine, vitalism, herbalism, magnetism and leeches, lances, tinctures and patent medicines were competing to be the new method for the century. Neither consumers nor many practitioners had much knowledge of either the causes of, or cures for, illnesses. The theory of modern medicine, fueled by Louis Pasteur's refutation of the centuries-old spontaneous generation theory in 1859, was growing as Charles Darwin published his book on natural selection. The German bacteriologist Robert Koch formulated his postulates, bringing scientific clarity to what was a new field. Drugs, medicines and quack cures were becoming more prevalent and were unregulated. Concerned about what he saw as the abusive nature of drugging, MD Andrew Taylor Still ventured into magnetic healing (meaning hypnotism) and bonesetting in 1875. He opened the American School of Osteopathy (ASO) in Kirksville, Missouri in 1892.

=== First chiropractic adjustment ===
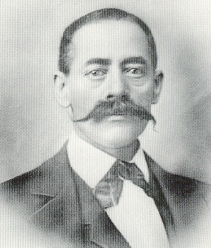
Harvey Lillard 1906

Daniel David Palmer (D.D. Palmer), a teacher and grocer turned magnetic healer, opened his office of magnetic healing in Davenport, Iowa in 1886. After nine years, D.D. Palmer gave the first chiropractic adjustment to Harvey Lillard, on September 18, 1895. According to D.D. Palmer, adjusting the spine was the cure for all diseases for the human race.

Palmer and his patient Harvey Lillard gave differing accounts of when and how Palmer began to experiment with spinal manipulation. Palmer recalled an incident in 1895 when he was investigating the medical history of a partially deaf man, Harvey Lillard. Lillard informed Palmer that while working in a cramped area seventeen years earlier, he felt a 'pop' in his back, and had been nearly deaf ever since. Palmer's examination found a sore lump which he believed was a spinal misalignment and a possible cause of Lillard's poor hearing. Palmer claimed to have corrected the misalignment and that Lillard's hearing improved.

Palmer said "there was nothing accidental about this, as it was accomplished with an object in view, and the expected result was obtained. There was nothing 'crude" about this adjustment; it was specific so much so that no chiropractor has equaled it."

However, this version was disputed by Lillard's daughter, Valdeenia Lillard Simons. She said that her father told her that he was telling jokes to a friend in the hall outside Palmer's office and, Palmer, who had been reading, joined them. When Lillard reached the punch line, Palmer, laughing heartily, slapped Lillard on the back with the hand holding the heavy book he had been reading. A few days later, Lillard told Palmer that his hearing seemed better. Palmer then decided to explore manipulation as an expansion of his magnetic healing practice. Simons said "the compact was that if they can make [something of] it, then they both would share. But, it didn't happen."

Since D.D. Palmer's first claim of restoring hearing to Harvey Lillard, there has been controversy about whether a link actually could exist between the spinal adjustment and return of hearing. Critics asserted that a spinal adjustment cannot affect certain areas – like the brain – because the spinal nerves do not extend into the encephalon. Years later, V. Strang, D.C. illustrated several neurological explanations including the recognition that sympathetic nerves arising in the lateral horns of the upper thoracic levels of the spine form the upper cervical ganglion with postganglionic fibers ascending to supply, among other things, blood vessels of the brain, but still with no connection to hearing. Others, though, talked about vertebral subluxation.

== Early growth ==
Rev. Samuel Weed

After the case of Harvey Lillard, Palmer stated: "I had a case of heart trouble which was not improving. I examined the spine and found a displaced vertebra pressing against the nerves which innervate the heart. I adjusted the vertebra and gave immediate relief – nothing "accidental" or "crude" about this. Then I began to reason if two diseases, so dissimilar as deafness and heart trouble, came from impingement, a pressure on nerves, were not other disease due to a similar cause? Thus the science (knowledge) and art (adjusting) of Chiropractic were formed at that time."

D.D. Palmer asked a patient and friend, Rev. Samuel Weed, to help him name his discovery. He suggested combining the Greek words cheiros and praktikos (meaning "done by hand") to describe Palmer's treatment method, creating the term "chiropractic." D.D. initially hoped to keep his discovery a family secret, but in 1896 he added a school to his magnetic healing infirmary, and began to teach others his method. It would become known as Palmer School of Chiropractic (PSC, now Palmer College of Chiropractic). Among the first graduates were Andrew P. Davis MD, DO, William A. Seally, MD, B.J. Palmer (D.D.'s son), Solon M. Langworthy, John Howard, and Shegataro Morikubo. Langworthy moved to Cedar Rapids, Iowa and opened the second chiropractic school in 1903, the American School of Chiropractic & Nature Cure (ASC & NC), combining it with what would become naturopathic cures and osteopathy. D.D. Palmer, who was not interested in mixing chiropractic with other cures, turned down an offer to be a partner.

D.D. Palmer established a magnetic healing facility in Davenport, Iowa, styling himself ‘doctor’. Not everyone was convinced, as a local paper in 1894 wrote about him: "A crank on magnetism has a crazy notion that he can cure the sick and crippled with his magnetic hands. His victims are the weak-minded, ignorant and superstitious, those foolish people who have been sick for years and have become tired of the regular physician and want health by the short-cut method…he has certainly profited by the ignorance of his victims…His increase in business shows what can be done in Davenport, even by a quack."

== Changing political and healthcare environment ==
The early 19th century had seen the rise of patent medicine and the nostrum remedium trade. Although some remedies were sold through doctors of medicine, most were sold directly to consumers by lay people, some of whom used questionable advertising claims. The addictive, and sometimes toxic, effects of some remedies, especially morphine and mercury-based cures, prompted the popular rise of less dangerous alternatives, such as homeopathy and eclectic medicine. In the mid-19th century, as germ theory began to replace the metaphysical causes of disease, the search for invisible microbes required the world to embrace the scientific method as a way to discover the cause of disease.

In the U.S., licensing for healthcare professionals had all but vanished around the time of the Civil War, leaving the profession open to anyone who felt inclined to become a physician; the market alone determined who would prove successful and who would not. Medical schools were plentiful, inexpensive and mostly privately owned. With free entry into the profession, and education in medicine cheap and available, many men entered practice, leading to an overabundance of practitioners which drove down the individual physician's income. In 1847, the American Medical Association (AMA) was formed and established higher standards for preliminary medical education and for the MD. At the time, most medical practitioners were unable to meet the stringent standards, so a "grandfather clause" was included. The effect was to limit the number of new practitioners.

In 1849, the AMA established a board to analyze quack remedies and nostrums and to enlighten the public about their nature and their dangers. Relationships were developed with pharmaceutical companies in an effort to curb the patent medicine crisis and consolidate the patient base around the medical doctor. By the turn of the 20th century, the AMA had created a Committee on National Legislation to represent the AMA in Washington and re-organized as the national organization of state and local associations. Intense political pressure by the AMA resulted in unlimited and unrestricted licensing only for medical physicians that were trained in AMA-endorsed colleges. By 1901, state medical boards were created in almost every state, requiring licentiates to provide a diploma from an AMA-approved medical college. By 1910, the AMA was a powerful force; this was the beginning of organized medicine.

In 1880, the teaching profession had begun significant changes as well. Advances in chemistry and science in Germany created strong incentives to create markets for their new products. By 1895, the new "Kulturopolitik" ideology of "First teach them; then sell them" had begun creating the political pressure necessary to improve teaching in science and math in schools and colleges in the US. The medical schools were the first to suffer the attack; they were ridiculed as obsolete – inadequate – and inefficient. The crisis attracted the attention of some of the world's richest men. In 1901, John D. Rockefeller created the "Rockefeller Institute for Medical Research". By 1906, the AMA's Council on Medical Education had created a list of unacceptable schools. In 1910, the Flexner Report, financed by the Carnegie Foundation, closed hundreds of private medical and homeopathic schools and named Johns Hopkins as the model school. The AMA had created the nonprofit, federally subsidized university hospital setting as the new teaching facility of the medical profession, effectively gaining control of all federal healthcare research and student aid.

== Osteopathic medicine vs chiropractic medicine ==
In 1870 Palmer was '"probably" a student of metaphysics, became a student of science in 1890 while practicing magnetic healing and after "discovering" chiropractic in 1895 attempted to merge science and metaphysics. In 1896, D.D. Palmer's first descriptions and underlying philosophy of chiropractic were strikingly similar to Andrew Still's principles of osteopathy established a decade earlier. Both described the body as a "machine" whose parts could be manipulated to produce a drugless cure. Both professed the use of spinal manipulation on joint dysfunction to improve health; chiropractors dubbed this manipulable lesion "subluxation" which interfered with the nervous system. Palmer drew further distinctions by noting that he was the first to use short-lever manipulative techniques using the spinous process and transverse processes as mechanical levers to spinal dysfunction/subluxation. Soon after, osteopaths began an American wide campaign proclaimed that chiropractic was a bastardized form of osteopathy and sought licensure to differentiate themselves. Although Palmer initially denied being trained by osteopathic medicine founder A.T. Still, in 1899 in papers held at the Palmer College of Chiropractic he wrote:

"Some years ago I took an expensive course in Electropathy, Cranial Diagnosis, Hydrotherapy, Facial Diagnosis. Later I took Osteopathy [which] gave me such a measure of confidence as to almost feel it unnecessary to seek other sciences for the mastery of curable disease. Having been assured that the underlying philosophy of chiropractic is the same as that of osteopathy...Chiropractic is osteopathy gone to seed."

== Medicine vs chiropractic ==
Since its inception, chiropractic was controversial amongst the established medical orthodoxy. Chiropractors were jailed for "practicing medicine without a license" which the profession designed a legal and political defence against prosecution arguing that chiropractic was "separate and distinct from medicine", asserting that chiropractors "analyzed" rather than "diagnosed", and "adjusted" subluxations rather than "treated" disease. In 1963 the American Medical Association formed a "Committee on Quackery" designed to "contain and eliminate" the chiropractic profession. In 1966, the AMA referred to chiropractic as an "unscientific cult" and until 1980 and held that it was unethical for medical doctors to associate themselves with "unscientific practitioners". Then in 1987, the AMA was found to have engaged in an unlawful conspiracy in restraint of trade "to contain and eliminate the chiropractic profession." In the 1980s, spinal manipulation gained mainstream recognition and has spurred ongoing collaboration into research of manipulative therapies and models of delivery of chiropractic care for musculoskeletal conditions in the mainstream healthcare sector.

In September 1899, a medical doctor in Davenport named Heinrich Matthey started a campaign against drugless healers in Iowa, demanding a change in the statute to prevent drugless healers from practicing in the state and claiming that health education could no longer be entrusted to anyone but doctors of medicine. Osteopathic schools across the country responded by developing a program of college inspection and accreditation. D.D. Palmer, whose school had just graduated its 7th student, insisted that his techniques did not need the same courses or license as medicine, as his graduates did not prescribe drugs or evaluate blood or urine. In 1901, D.D. was charged with misrepresenting a course in chiropractic which was not a real science. He persisted in his strong stance against licensure, citing freedom of choice as his cause. He was arrested twice more by 1906, and although he contended that he was not practicing medicine, he was convicted for professing he could cure disease without a license in medicine or osteopathy. Dr Solon Langworthy, who continued to mix chiropractic at the ASC&NC, took a different route for chiropractic. He improved classrooms and provided a curriculum of study instead of the single course. He narrowed the scope of chiropractic to the treatment of the spine and nervous system, leaving blood work to the osteopath, and began to refer to the brain as the "life force". He was the first to use the word subluxation to describe the misalignment that narrowed the "spinal windows" (or intervertebral foramina) and interrupted the nerve energy. In 1906, Langworthy published the first book on chiropractic, Modernized Chiropractic" – "Special Philosophy – A Distinct System. He brought chiropractic into the scientific arena.

== B.J. Palmer re-develops chiropractic ==
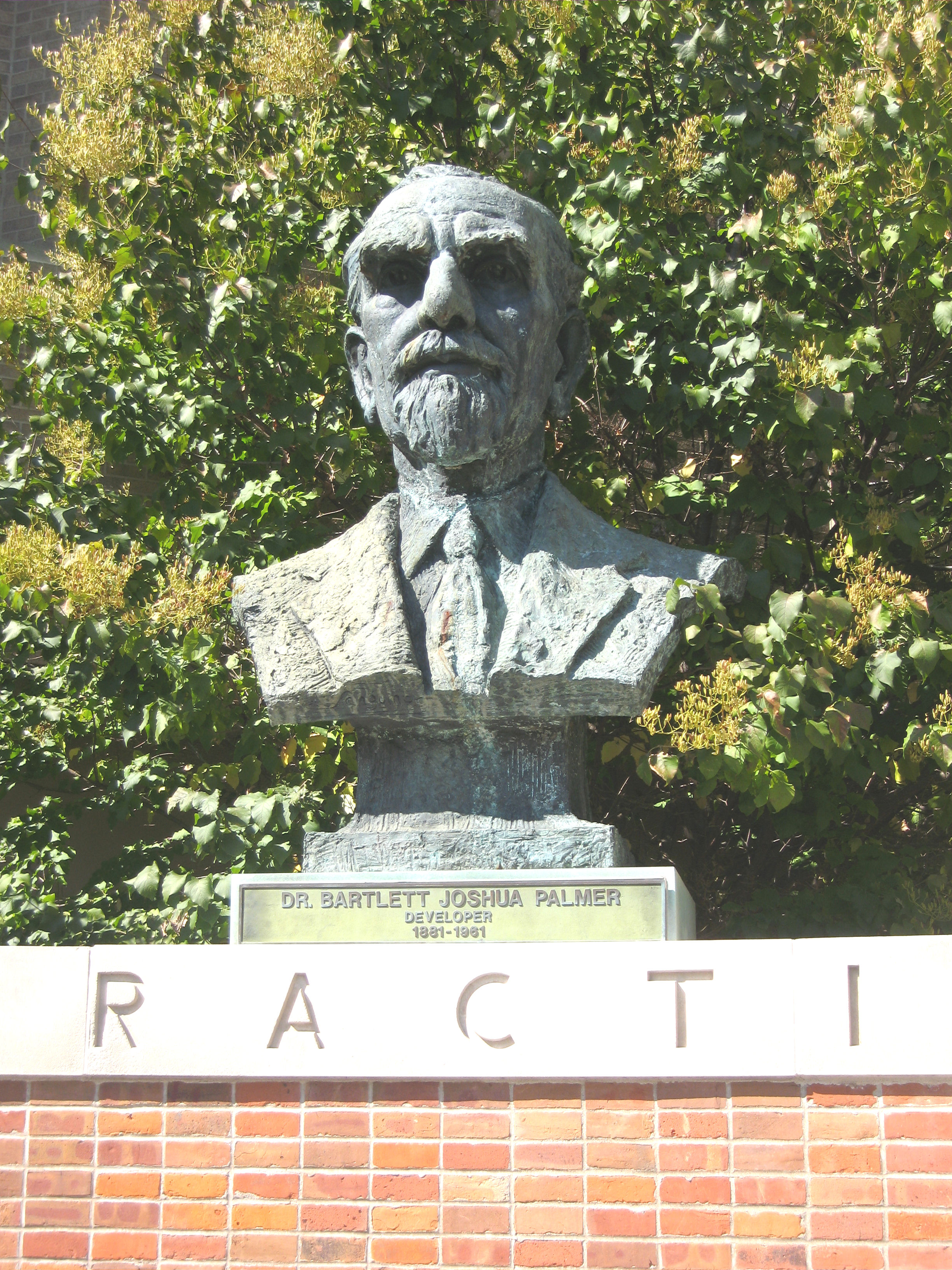
B.J. Palmer, developer of chiropractic

D.D. Palmer's student and son, B.J. Palmer, assumed control of the Palmer School in 1906, and promoted professionalism and formal training in chiropractic, expanding enrollment to a peak of above 1,000 students in the early 1920s. Chiropractic leaders of the time often invoked religious imagery, and B.J. seriously considered declaring chiropractic a religion, deciding against this partly to avoid confusion with Christian Science. B.J. also worked to overcome chiropractic's initial resistance to the use of medical technology, by accepting diagnostic technology such as spinal X-rays (which he called spinography) in 1910.

Prosecution of DCs for unlicensed practice after the conviction of D.D. Palmer and a previous charge against B.J. Palmer resulted in B.J. and several Palmer graduates creating the Universal Chiropractic Association (UCA). Its initial purpose was to protect its members by covering their legal expenses should they get arrested. Its first case came in 1907, when Shegataro Morikubo DC of Wisconsin was charged with unlicensed practice of osteopathy. It was a test of the new osteopathic law. In an ironic twist, using mixer Langworthy's book Modernized Chiropractic, attorney Tom Morris legally differentiated chiropractic from osteopathy by the differences in the philosophy of chiropractic's "supremacy of the nerve" and osteopathy's "supremacy of the artery". Morikubo was freed, and the victory reshaped the development of the chiropractic profession, which then marketed itself as a science, an art and a philosophy, and B.J. Palmer became the "Philosopher of Chiropractic".

John F.A. Howard, DC, founder, National College of Chiropractic

B.J. Palmer believed that their chiropractic school was founded on "…a business, not a professional basis. We manufacture chiropractors. We teach them the idea and then we show them how to sell it". The next 15 years saw the opening of 30 more chiropractic schools, including John Howard's National School of Chiropractic (now the National University of Health Sciences) that moved to Chicago, Illinois. Each school attempted to develop its own identity, while B.J. Palmer continued to develop the philosophy behind his father's discovery. Fueled by the persistent and provocative advertising of recent chiropractic graduates, local medical communities, who had the power of the state at their disposal, immediately had them arrested. There were only 12,000 practicing chiropractors with more than 15,000 prosecutions for practicing medicine without a license in the first 30 years. D.D. Palmer was also jailed for practicing medicine without a license. Tom Morris and his partner, Fred Hartwell, were able to successfully defend 80% through the UCA. B.J. would later note about those battles:

"We are always mindful of those early days when UCA...used various expedients to defeat medical court prosecutions. We legally squirmed this way and that, here and there. We did not diagnose, treat, or cure disease. We analyzed, adjusted cause, and Innate in patient cured. All were professional matters of fact in science, therefore justifiable in legal use to defeat medical trials and convictions."

His influence over the next several years further divided the mixers, or those who mixed chiropractic with other cures, from the straights who practiced chiropractic by itself.

== D.D. Palmer's last years ==
While B.J. worked to protect and develop chiropractic around the Palmer school, D.D. Palmer continued to develop his techniques from Oregon. In 1910, he theorized that nerves control health.

Before his sudden and controversial death in 1913, D.D. Palmer often voiced concern for B.J. Palmer's management of chiropractic. He challenged B.J.'s methods and philosophy and made every effort to regain control of chiropractic. He repudiated his earlier theory that vertebral subluxations caused pinched nerves in the intervertebral spaces in favor of subluxations causing altered nerve vibration, either too tense or too slack, affecting the tone(health) of the end organ and noted, "A subluxated vertebra . . . is the cause of 95 percent of all diseases. . . . The other five percent is caused by displaced joints other than those of the vertebral column."

During the long-fought battle for licensure in California, in 1911 he wrote of his philosophy for chiropractic, and hinted at his plan for the legal defense of chiropractic.

In "The Chiropractor", published posthumously in 1914, D.D. Palmer revisits the topic of chiropractic as religion, quoting F.W. Carlin as saying "The Religion of Chiropractic is absurd". He continued: "I fully agree with Dr. Carlin. To say or think that the science, art and philosophy of Chiropractic, or that Chiropractic, the three combined, has a religion, is really absurd and ridiculous".

The 2008 book Trick or Treatment states that in 1913 B.J. Palmer ran over his father, D.D. Palmer, at a homecoming parade for the Palmer School of Chiropractic. Weeks later D.D. Palmer died. The official cause of death was recorded as typhoid. The book Trick or Treatment indicated "it seems more likely that his death was a direct result of injuries caused by his son." There was speculation that it was not an accident, but instead a case of patricide. Chiropractic historian Joseph C. Keating, Jr. has described the attempted patricide of D.D. Palmer as a "myth" and "absurd on its face" and cites an eyewitness who recalled that DD was not struck by BJ's car, but rather, had stumbled. He also says that "Joy Loban, DC, executor of DD's estate, voluntarily withdrew a civil suit claiming damages against B.J. Palmer, and that several grand juries repeatedly refused to bring criminal charges against the son." They had become bitter rivals over the leadership of chiropractic. B.J. Palmer resented his father for the way he treated his family, stating that his father beat three of his children with straps and was so much involved in chiropractic that he hardly knew his children. D. D. claimed that his son B. J. struck him with his car.

== Straights versus mixers ==
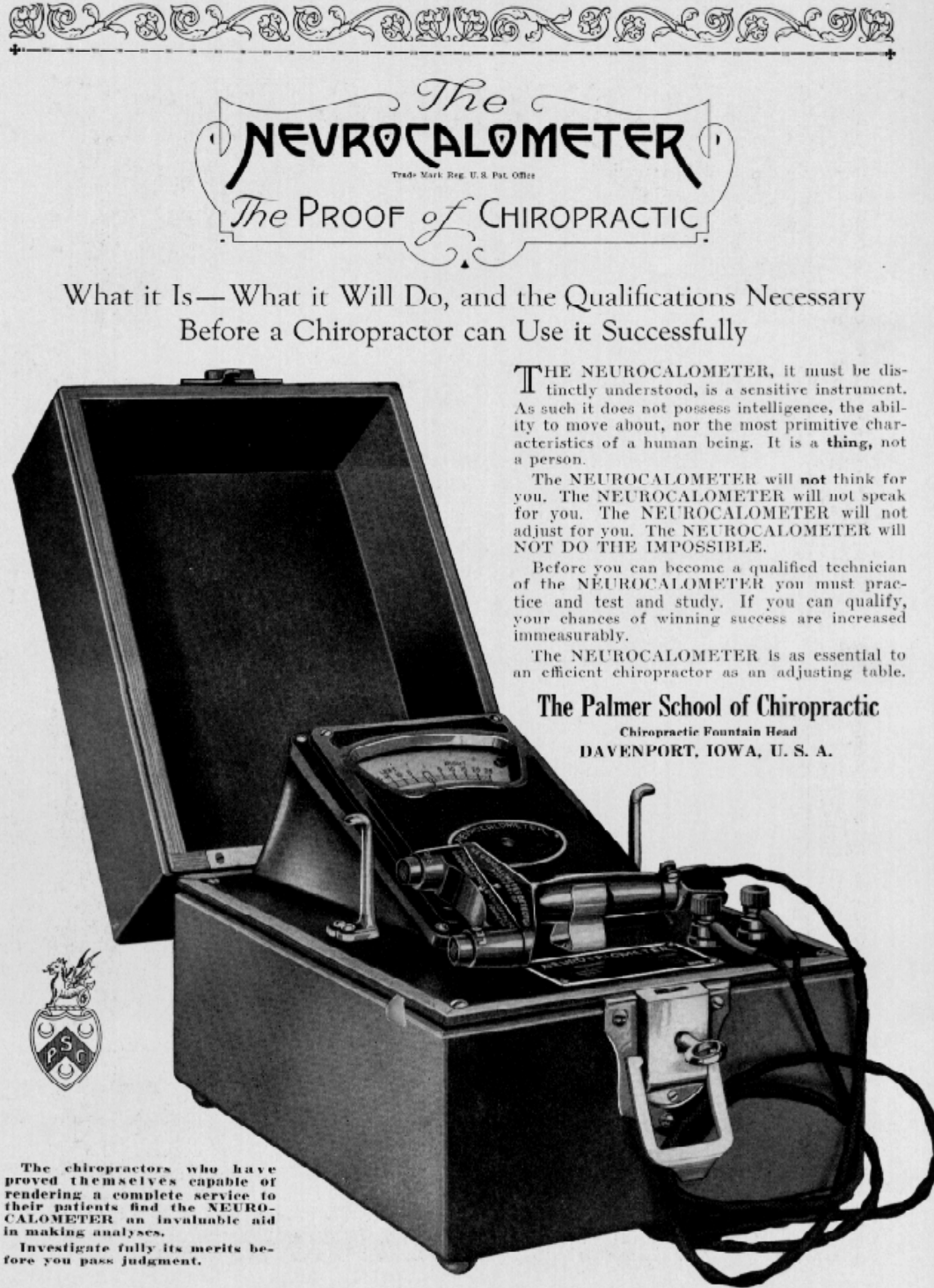
1925 advertisement for the Neurocalometer from Palmer School of Chiropractic

State laws to regulate and protect chiropractic practice were introduced in all fifty states in the United States. Medical Examining Boards worked to keep all healthcare practices under their legal control, but an internal struggle among DC's on how to structure the laws complicated the process. Initially, the UCA, led by B.J. Palmer, opposed state licensure altogether. Palmer feared that such regulation would lead to MD physician control of the profession. The UCA eventually caved in, but B.J. remained strong in the opinion that examining boards should be composed exclusively of chiropractors (not mixers), and the educational standards to be adhered to were the same as the Palmer School. A "Model Bill" was drafted in 1922 to present to all states that did not yet have a law. They warned state associations to purge their mixing members or face competition by the formation of a new "straight" association in their state.

Although D.D. and B.J. were "straight" and disdained the use of instruments, some early chiropractors, whom B.J. scornfully called "mixers", advocated the use of instruments. In 1910 B.J. changed course and endorsed X-rays as necessary for diagnosis; this resulted in a significant exodus from the Palmer School of the more conservative faculty and students.

The mixer camp grew until by 1924 B.J. estimated that only 3,000 of the U.S.'s 25,000 chiropractors remained straight. That year, B.J.'s invention and promotion of the neurocalometer, a temperature-sensing device, was highly controversial among B.J.'s fellow straights. By the 1930s chiropractic was the largest alternative healing profession in the U.S.

Frank Margetts circa 1922

Mixers, disturbed by the edicts of the PSC having so much influence in their daily practice, created the American Chiropractic Association (one of the early precursors to today's ACA). Though born out of necessity to defend against the UCA attacks, the ACA's stated purposes were to advance education and research for chiropractic. Its growth was initially stunted by its resolution to recognize physio-therapy and other modalities as pertaining to chiropractic. What growth did occur was credited to its second president, Frank R. Margetts, DC with support from his alma mater, National Chiropractic College. He insisted that no college administrator could hold an official position in the association, giving doctors in the field a collective voice. But a disagreement within the UCA in 1924 turned the tide for the ACA. B.J. was still working to purge mixers from practicing chiropractic, and he saw a new invention by Dossa D. Evans, the "Neurocalometer" (NCM), as the answer to all of straight chiropractic's (and particularly PSC's) legal and financial problems. As the owner of the patent on the NCM, he planned to limit the number of NCMs to 5000 and lease them only to graduates of the Palmer related schools who were members of the UCA. He then claimed that the NCM was the only way to accurately locate subluxations, preventing over 20,000 mixers from being able to defend their method of practice.

There was an immediate uproar among practicing DCs. Even Tom Moore, B.J.'s long-time ally and president of the UCA, displayed his dismay by resigning (though he was later reinstated). B.J. reluctantly resigned as treasurer, ending his relationship with the UCA. B.J. moved on to form the Chiropractic Health Bureau (today's ICA), along with his staunchest supporters and Fred Hartwell (Tom Moore's partner) acting as council. Membership in the UCA dropped while the ACA membership rose. In 1930, the ACA and UCA joined to form the National Chiropractic Association (NCA). The NCA developed a Committee on Educational Standards (CES), making John J. Nugent DC responsible for raising educational standards for the profession. The years of consolidation or closing of unacceptable schools while developing the new standards earned Nugent the nickname "Chiropractic's Abraham Flexner" from his admirers and "Chiropractic's Anti-christ" from his adversaries. The CES evolved into today's Council on Chiropractic Education (CCE), and was granted the status of chiropractic's accrediting body by the US Department of Education. Nugent was also instrumental in the Chiropractic Research Foundation (CRF), today's Foundation for Chiropractic Education and Research (FCER). The differences in state laws that exist today can be traced back to these early legal struggles.

Chiropractic struggled with survival and identity during its formative years, including internal struggles between its leaders and colleges. Chiropractic is rooted in mystical concepts, leading to internal conflicts between straights and mixers which continue to this day. Objective Straight chiropractors, who are an offshoot of straights, only focus on the correction of chiropractic vertebral subluxations while traditional straights claim that chiropractic adjustments are a plausible treatment for a wide range of diseases. Reform chiropractors are an evidence-based offshoot of mixers who reject traditional Palmer philosophy and tend not to use alternative medicine methods. From 1984 to about 2008, some of them were organized as the National Association for Chiropractic Medicine, an organization which met strong opposition from the profession and finally ceased to exist.

== Debate ==
There is continued disagreement over what "innate" and "subluxation" mean to chiropractic. Some chiropractors believe in Innate Intelligence, a faith-based, unscientific belief which has been a source of derision for chiropractors. Chiropractors historically were strongly opposed to vaccination based on their belief that all diseases were traceable to causes in the spine, and therefore could not be affected by vaccines; D.D. Palmer wrote, "It is the very height of absurdity to strive to 'protect' any person from smallpox or any other malady by inoculating them with a filthy animal poison." There is significant disagreement within the chiropractic community concerning vaccination, one of the most cost-effective public health interventions available. Early opposition to water fluoridation included chiropractors in the U.S. Some chiropractors oppose water fluoridation as being incompatible with chiropractic philosophy and an infringement of personal freedom. Although most chiropractic writings on vaccination focus on its negative aspects, antivaccination sentiment is espoused by what appears to be a minority of chiropractors. Recently, other chiropractors have actively promoted fluoridation, and several chiropractic organizations have endorsed scientific principles of public health.

== AMA plans to eliminate chiropractic ==
On November 2, 1963, the AMA Board of Regents created the "Committee on Quackery" with the goals of first containing, and then eliminating chiropractic. H. Doyle Taylor, the Director of the AMA Department of Investigation and Secretary of the Committee on Quackery, outlined the steps needed:

1. to ensure that Medicare should not cover chiropractic
2. to ensure that the U.S. Office of Education should not recognize or list a chiropractic accrediting agency
3. to encourage continued separation of the two national associations
4. to encourage state medical societies to take the initiative in their state legislatures in regard to legislation that might affect the practice of chiropractic.

The AMA worked to spread information designed to discredit chiropractic through public media and the scientific literature.

The longstanding feud between chiropractors and medical doctors continued for decades. The AMA labeled chiropractic an "unscientific cult" in 1966, and until 1980 held that it was unethical for medical doctors to associate with "unscientific practitioners". In 1975, an anonymous AMA insider describing himself as a disgruntled AMA staffer and identifying himself as "Sore Throat" released information concerning the Committee on Quackery and its proposed methods to eliminate chiropractic to the press. These papers were the basis of Wilk et al. vs. AMA, the suit brought by Chester Wilk, D.C., of Illinois and five co-plaintiffs against the AMA and several co-defendants. After two trials, on September 25, 1987, Getzendanner issued her opinion that the AMA had violated Section 1, but not 2, of the Sherman Act, and that it had engaged in an unlawful conspiracy in restraint of trade "to contain and eliminate the chiropractic profession." (Wilk v. American Medical Ass'n, 671 F. Supp. 1465, N.D. Ill. 1987).

== Movement toward scientific reform ==
Research to test chiropractic theories began in 1935 with the B.J. Palmer Research Clinic at the Palmer College of Chiropractic in Davenport, Iowa. The clinic was organized into two divisions – a medical division and a chiropractic division. The medical division contained all the standard medical tests of the time and was used to establish a medical diagnosis of a patient's condition before the patient received treatment. The chiropractic division administered the treatment which included passive therapies, chiropractic adjustments and physical rehabilitation for the various conditions diagnosed. Research continued in the B.J. Palmer research clinic until B.J. Palmer's death in 1961 and the results and findings of these patient cases were the substance of B.J. Palmer's publishing over this 30-year time-period.

By the late 1950s, healthcare in the US had been transformed: the discovery of penicillin and the development of the polio vaccine was restoring hope to millions, and the homeopathic physician had all but vanished as a result of "antiquackery" efforts of the medical trust and leadership efforts of the AMA. B.J. reduced the adjustment to HIO (Hole In One – the adjustment of only the atlas), while mixers continued to add and refine new proprietary techniques to find and reduce subluxations and improve health. Osteopathy in the US developed in parallel to medicine and dropped its reliance on spinal manipulation to treat illness. A similar reform movement began within chiropractic: shortly after the death of B.J. in 1961, a second-generation chiropractor, Samuel Homola, wrote extensively on the subject of limiting the use of spinal manipulation, proposing that chiropractic as a medical specialty should focus on conservative care of musculoskeletal conditions. His sentiments echoed those of the NCA chairman of the board (C.O. Watkins DC) twenty years earlier: "If we will not develop a scientific organization to test our own methods, organized medicine will usurp our privilege. When it discovers a method of value, medical science will adopt it and incorporate it into scientific medical practice." Homola's membership in the newly formed ACA was not renewed, and his position was rejected by both straight and mixer associations.

Chiropractic is classified as a field of pseudomedicine on account of its esoteric origins. Serious research to test chiropractic theories did not begin until the 1970s, and is continuing to be hampered by antiscientific and pseudoscientific ideas that sustained the profession in its long battle with organized medicine. In 1975, the National Institutes of Health brought chiropractors, osteopaths, medical doctors and PhD scientists together at a conference on spinal manipulation to develop strategies to study the effects of spinal manipulation. In 1978, the Journal of Manipulative and Physiological Therapeutics (JMPT) was launched, and in 1981 it was included in the National Library of Medicine's Index Medicus. Joseph C. Keating, Jr. dates the birth of chiropractic as a science to a 1983 commentary in the JMPT entitled "Notes from the (chiropractic college) underground" in which Kenneth F. DeBoer, then an instructor in basic science at Palmer College in Iowa, revealed the power of a scholarly journal (JMPT) to empower faculty at the chiropractic schools. DeBoer's opinion piece demonstrated the faculty's authority to challenge the status quo, to publicly address relevant, albeit sensitive, issues related to research, training and skepticism at chiropractic colleges, and to produce "cultural change" within the chiropractic schools so as to increase research and professional standards. It was a rallying call for chiropractic scientists and scholars. By the mid-1990s there was a growing scholarly interest in chiropractic, which helped efforts to improve service quality and establish clinical guidelines that recommended manual therapies for acute low back pain.

In 2008, Simon Singh was sued for libel by the British Chiropractic Association (BCA) for criticizing their activities in a column in The Guardian. A preliminary hearing took place at the Royal Courts of Justice in front of Justice David Eady. The judge held that merely using the phrase "happily promotes bogus treatments" meant that he was stating, as a matter of fact, that the British Chiropractic Association was being consciously dishonest in promoting chiropractic for treating the children's ailments in question. An editorial in Nature has suggested that the BCA may be trying to suppress debate and that this use of British libel law is a burden on the right to freedom of expression, which is protected by the European Convention on Human Rights. The libel case ended with the BCA withdrawing its suit in 2010.
