= Chiropractic controversy and criticism =

Throughout its history, chiropractic has been the subject of internal and external controversy and criticism. According to magnetic healer Daniel D. Palmer, the founder of chiropractic, "vertebral subluxation" was the sole cause of all diseases and manipulation was the cure for all disease. Internal divisions between "straights," who adhere strictly to Palmer's original philosophy, and "mixers," who incorporate broader medical practices, have further complicated the profession's identity.

A 2003 profession-wide survey found "most chiropractors (whether 'straights' or 'mixers') still hold views of Innate Intelligence and of the cause and cure of disease (not just back pain) consistent with those of the Palmers". A critical evaluation stated "Chiropractic is rooted in mystical concepts. This led to an internal conflict within the chiropractic profession, which continues today." Chiropractors, including Palmer, were jailed for practicing medicine without a license. Palmer considered establishing chiropractic as a religion to resolve this problem. For most of its existence, chiropractic has battled with mainstream medicine, sustained by antiscientific and pseudoscientific ideas such as vertebral subluxation.

Chiropractic researchers have documented that fraud, abuse and quackery are more prevalent in chiropractic than in other health care professions. Unsubstantiated claims about the efficacy of chiropractic have continued to be made by individual chiropractors and chiropractic associations. The core concept of traditional chiropractic, vertebral subluxation, is not based on sound science. Collectively, systematic reviews have not demonstrated that spinal manipulation, the main treatment method employed by chiropractors, was effective for any medical condition. Spinal manipulation, particularly of the upper spine, can cause complications in adults and children that can cause permanent disability or death. Scientific studies have generally found limited evidence for chiropractic efficacy beyond back pain, and concerns about patient safety, particularly with neck manipulations, have been raised.

Legal battles, including the landmark Wilk v. AMA case and Simon Singh's libel suit, highlight tensions between chiropractors and mainstream medicine. Ethical issues, such as misleading advertising and opposition to vaccination, continue to draw criticism. Despite efforts to modernize, chiropractic remains controversial within both the medical community and the public sphere.

In 2008, Simon Singh was sued for libel by the British Chiropractic Association (BCA) for criticizing their activities in a column in The Guardian. A preliminary hearing took place at the Royal Courts of Justice in front of judge David Eady. The judge held that merely using the phrase "happily promotes bogus treatments" meant that he was stating, as a matter of fact, that the British Chiropractic Association was being consciously dishonest in promoting chiropractic for treating the children's ailments in question. An editorial in Nature has suggested that the BCA may be trying to suppress debate and that this use of British libel law is a burden on the right to freedom of expression, which is protected by the European Convention on Human Rights. The libel case ended with the BCA withdrawing its suit in 2010.

Chiropractors historically were strongly opposed to vaccination based on their belief that all diseases were traceable to causes in the spine, and therefore could not be affected by vaccines. Some chiropractors continue to be opposed to vaccination. Early opposition to water fluoridation included chiropractors in the U.S. Some chiropractors opposed water fluoridation as being incompatible with chiropractic philosophy and an infringement of personal freedom. More recently, other chiropractors have actively promoted fluoridation, and several chiropractic organizations have endorsed scientific principles of public health.

== Historical controversy and critical elements ==
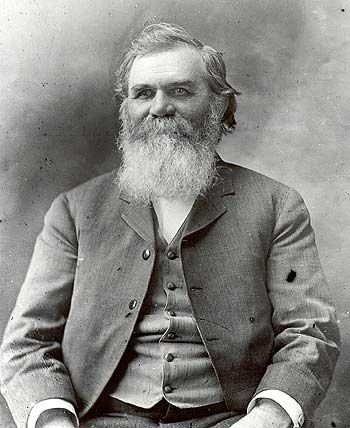
D.D. Palmer

The birth of chiropractic was on September 18, 1895. There is controversy over what happened with several different accounts. Daniel D. Palmer later claimed that on that day he manipulated the spine of Harvey Lillard, a man who was nearly deaf, allegedly curing him of deafness. Palmer said "there was nothing accidental about this, as it was accomplished with an object in view, and the expected result was obtained. There was nothing 'crude' about this adjustment; it was specific so much so that no chiropractor has equaled it."

However, this version was disputed by Lillard's daughter, Valdeenia Lillard Simons. She said that her father told her that he was telling jokes to a friend in the hall outside Palmer's office and Palmer, who had been reading, joined them. When Lillard reached the punch line, Palmer, laughing heartily, slapped Lillard on the back with the hand holding the heavy book he had been reading. A few days later, Lillard told Palmer that his hearing seemed better. Palmer then decided to explore manipulation as an expansion of his magnetic healing practice. Simons said "the compact was that if they can make [something of] it, then they both would share. But, it didn't happen."

In spite of the fact that Lillard could hear well enough to tell jokes, B.J. Palmer claimed under sworn testimony that Lillard had been "thoroughly deaf". Since 1895, the story of Palmer's curing a man of deafness has been a part of chiropractic tradition. Palmer's account differs significantly from what actually happened, in that, according to Lillard's daughter, his improved hearing was likely caused by an accidentally fortuitous jarring of Lillard's body and not, as claimed by D.D. Palmer, caused by a "specific" adjustment. It was after this event that Palmer began to experiment with manipulation. He also claimed that his second patient, a man with heart disease, was also cured by spinal manipulation.

Chiropractic included vitalistic ideas of Innate Intelligence with religious attributes of Universal Intelligence as substitutes for science. Evidence suggests that D.D. Palmer had acquired knowledge of manipulative techniques from Andrew Taylor Still, the founder of osteopathy. Although D.D. Palmer combined bonesetting to give chiropractic its method, and "magnetic healing" for the theory, he acknowledged a special relation to magnetic healing when he wrote, "chiropractic was not evolved from medicine or any other method, except that of magnetic." He also "claimed that his profession had nothing to do with medicine, that he healed by the laying on of hands;... He also said that he had a diploma from no earthly school but from High Heaven."

According to D.D. Palmer, subluxation was the sole cause of all diseases and manipulation was the cure for all diseases of the human race. A 2003 profession-wide survey found:

most chiropractors (whether "straights" or "mixers") still hold views of Innate and of the cause and cure of disease (not just back pain) consistent with those of the Palmers. On one hand, modern promotional brochures make a bid for medical legitimacy by describing Innate and adjustments using more scientific-sounding terms such as "inherent" and "nerve force."

Chiropractic has had a strong salesmanship element since it was started by D.D. Palmer. His son, B.J. Palmer, asserted that their chiropractic school was founded on "...a business, not a professional basis. We manufacture chiropractors. We teach them the idea and then we show them how to sell it". D.D. Palmer established a magnetic healing facility in Davenport, Iowa, styling himself 'doctor'. Not everyone was convinced, as a local paper in 1894 wrote about him:

A crank on magnetism has a crazy notion that he can cure the sick and crippled with his magnetic hands. His victims are the weak-minded, ignorant and superstitious, those foolish people who have been sick for years and have become tired of the regular physician and want health by the short-cut method... he has certainly profited by the ignorance of his victims... His increase in business shows what can be done in Davenport, even by a quack.

Before adopting the term "chiropractic" in about 1896, his advertising used the term "magnetic". In 1891–92, a city business directory stated: "Dr. Palmer can cure with his Magnetic Hands Diseases of the Head, Throat, Heart, Lungs, Stomach, Liver, Spleen, Kidneys, Nerves, and Muscles, ten times quicker than any one can with medicines."

Give me a simple mind that thinks along single tracts, give me 30 days to instruct him, and that individual can go forth on the highways and byways and get more sick people well than the best, most complete, all around, unlimited medical education of any medical man who ever lived.

Chiropractic was rooted in mystical concepts, leading to internal conflicts between straights and mixers which still persist. It has two main groups: "straights", now the minority, emphasize vitalism, innate intelligence and spinal adjustments, and consider subluxations to be the leading cause of all disease; "mixers" are more open to mainstream and alternative medical techniques such as exercise, massage, nutritional supplements, and acupuncture. The straights adhere religiously to the gospel of its founders while mixers are more open. There is a lack of uniformity and consensus among chiropractors in regard to their role. Depending upon whose point of view, chiropractors are, for example, subluxation-correctors, primary care physicians, neuromusculoskeletal specialists, or holistic health specialists. Straights have claimed mixers are not real chiropractors because they do not acknowledge Palmer's foundation of chiropractic therapy.

In 1906, D.D. Palmer was the first of hundreds of chiropractors who went to jail. Chiropractors were jailed for practicing medicine without a license. In the 1920s hundreds of unlicensed chiropractors chose jail rather than fines. Herbert Reaver was the most jailed chiropractor in the U.S. Chiropractors were charged with not complying with the medical practice act. California chiropractors adopted the motto, "Go to jail for chiropractic." 450 chiropractors were jailed in a single year at the peak of the controversy. Many chiropractors treated fellow prisoners and visiting patients while in jail.

Chiropractors, including Palmer, faced frequent legal battles, leading to efforts to reframe chiropractic as a religious practice to circumvent medical licensing laws. D.D. Palmer defined chiropractic as "a science of healing without drugs" and considered establishing chiropractic as a religion as a means to use religious "exemption clauses" to resolve legal difficulties presented by restrictive "chiro laws". In 1911, he stated (emphasis in original):

You ask, what I think will be the final outcome of our law getting. It will be that we will have to build a boat similar to Christian Science and hoist a religious flag. I have received chiropractic from the other world, similar as did Mrs. Eddy. No other one has laid claim to that, NOT EVEN B.J. Exemption clauses instead of chiro laws by all means, and LET THAT EXEMPTION BE THE RIGHT TO PRACTICE OUR RELIGION. But we must have a religious head, one who is the founder, as did Christ, Mohamed, Jo. Smith, Mrs. Eddy, Martin Luther and others who have founded religions. I am the fountain head. I am the founder of chiropractic in its science, in its art, in its philosophy and in its religious phase. Now, if chiropractors desire to claim me as their head, their leader, the way is clear. My writings have been gradually steering in that direction until now it is time to assume that we have the same right to as has Christian Scientists.

Chiropractors have struggled with survival and identity during its formative years, including internal struggles between its leaders and colleges. For much of the history of the chiropractic profession chiropractors showed little interest in scientific research and regarded their principles and practices as valid. Despite heavy opposition by mainstream medicine, by the 1930s chiropractic was the largest alternative healing profession in the U.S. Long-standing American Medical Association (AMA) policies against chiropractic contributed to a lack of acceptance within mainstream public health. The AMA created the Committee on Quackery "to contain and eliminate chiropractic." Using the Committee on Quackery, efforts were made to prevent the participation of chiropractic in organized health care. In 1966 a policy passed by the AMA House of Delegates stating:

It is the position of the medical profession that chiropractic is an unscientific cult whose practitioners lack the necessary training and background to diagnose and treat human disease. Chiropractic constitutes a hazard to rational health care in the United States because of its substandard and unscientific education of its practitioners and their rigid adherence to an irrational, unscientific approach to disease causation.

The longstanding feud between chiropractors and medical doctors continued for decades. The AMA labeled chiropractic an "unscientific cult" in 1966, and until 1980 held that it was unethical for medical doctors to associate with "unscientific practitioners". This culminated in a landmark 1987 decision, Wilk v. AMA, in which the court found that the AMA had engaged in unreasonable restraint of trade and conspiracy, and which ended the AMA's de facto boycott of chiropractic. The rivalry was not solely with conventional medicine; many osteopaths proclaimed that chiropractic was a bastardized form of osteopathy.

Serious research to test chiropractic theories did not begin until the 1970s, and continues to be hampered by antiscientific and pseudoscientific ideas that sustained the profession in its long battle with organized medicine. By the mid-1990s there was a growing scholarly interest in chiropractic, which helped efforts to improve service quality and establish clinical guidelines that recommended manual therapies for acute low back pain. Some people believe chiropractic has little more than a placebo effect, while some randomized trials of spinal manipulation have supported its effectiveness for the treatment of (specifically) low back pain. There are several barriers between primary care physicians and chiropractors for having positive referral relationships which includes a lack of good communication. The medical establishment has not entirely accepted chiropractic care as mainstream. After 100 years, the chiropractic profession has failed to define a message that is understandable, credible, and scientifically valid. The future of chiropractic is uncertain due to the economic struggles and restrictions of the science and methods in chiropractic.

Chiropractic has seen considerable controversy within the profession over its philosophy. In connection with a controversial and divisive 2015 organizational split in the Australian chiropractic community, an article described the profession's long standing and current problems:

The chiropractic profession is notorious for its infighting, with quarrels over the value of vaccination, the evidence or lack thereof to support the theory of subluxation and whether spinal adjustments should be performed on children.

=== Allegations of patricide connected with the death of D.D. Palmer ===
The 2008 book Trick or Treatment states that in 1913 B.J. Palmer ran over his father, D.D. Palmer, during a homecoming parade at the Palmer School of Chiropractic. Weeks later D.D. Palmer died. The official cause of death was recorded as typhoid. The book Trick or Treatment indicated "it seems more likely that his death was a direct result of injuries caused by his son. Indeed there is speculation that this was not an accident, but rather a case of patricide." A 1999 documentary study suggests D.D. Palmer's widow may have also played a role in the patricide controversy. D.D. Palmer's attending physicians were persuaded to change their opinions about the main cause of death. Chiropractic historian Joseph C. Keating Jr. has described the attempted patricide of D.D. Palmer as a "myth" and "absurd on its face" and cites an eyewitness who recalled that D.D. was not struck by B.J.'s car, but rather, had stumbled. He also says that "Joy Loban, DC, executor of D. D.'s estate, voluntarily withdrew a civil suit claiming damages against B.J. Palmer, and that several grand juries repeatedly refused to bring criminal charges against the son." A 1969 article stated that in July 1913 at the Palmer School of Chiropractic B.J. Palmer:

insisted on leading the alumni procession, but was prohibited from doing so by the marshal of the parade, who was a student at the school. An altercation ensued. B.J. drove up in his automobile. Words passed between father and son. What happened after that depends on whom you believe. Daniel David claimed that B.J. struck him with his automobile, and D.D.'s friends and allies later produced affidavits of witnesses to prove it. B.J. flatly denied it, and produced many more affidavits to this effect than D.D.'s cohorts were able to muster.

== Ethics and claims ==
A study of California disciplinary statistics during 1997–2000 reported 4.5 disciplinary actions per 1000 chiropractors per year, compared to 2.27 for medical doctors, and the incident rate for fraud was 9 times greater among chiropractors (1.99 per 1000 chiropractors per year) than among medical doctors (0.20). Public trust in chiropractors remains mixed. While many patients report positive experiences, surveys consistently rank chiropractors lower in perceived honesty and ethical standards compared to other healthcare providers. According to a 2006 Gallup Poll of U.S. adults, when asked how they would "rate the honesty and ethical standards of people in these different fields", chiropractic compared unfavorably with mainstream medicine. When chiropractic was rated, it "rated dead last amongst healthcare professions". While 84% of respondents considered nurses' ethics "very high" or "high", only 36% felt that way about chiropractors. Other healthcare professions ranged from 38% for psychiatrists, to 62% for dentists, 69% for other medical doctors, 71% for veterinarians, and 73% for druggists or pharmacists. Similar results were found in the 2003 Gallup Poll. Chiropractic authors have placed these results in perspective in articles, with one writing that "we were the least trusted and least believed health care discipline", and another writing that chiropractors who use unethical marketing methods "poison the well" for others in the profession, and that they "might be responsible for the negative opinion people have about the ethics of the chiropractic profession." Many chiropractors have sought to address their minor status within the U.S. medical community by attending practice-building seminars to assist chiropractors to persuade their patients of the efficacy of their treatments, increase their revenue, and boost their morale as unorthodox medical practitioners.

Historically the profession has often been accused of quackery, with the profession often responding negatively to such accusations. In its early days, the accusation of quackery was voiced in a 1913 editorial in the Journal of the American Medical Association: (p. 29)

Chiropractic is a freak offshoot from osteopathy. Disease, say the chiropractors, is due to pressure on the spinal nerves; ergo it can be cured by 'adjusting' the spinal column. It is the sheerest quackery, and those who profess to teach it make their appeal to the cupidity of the ignorant. Its practice is in no sense a profession but a trade – and a trade that is potent for great harm. It is carried on almost exclusively by those of no education, ignorant of anatomy, ignorant even of the fundamental sciences on which the treatment of disease depends.

The view that chiropractic was a trade, rather than a profession, was stated clearly by B.J. Palmer, who asserted that chiropractic was founded on "a business, not a professional basis. "We manufacture chiropractors. We teach them the idea and then we show them how to sell it". In more modern times (1991), when the president of the ACA called accusations of quackery a "myth", chiropractic historian, Joseph C. Keating Jr. responded by calling his comments "absurd" and stated:

The so-called 'quackery myth about chiropractic' is no myth ... the kernels of quackery (i.e., unsubstantiated and untested health remedies offered as "proven") are ubiquitous in this profession. I dare say that health misinformation (if not quackery) can be found in just about any issue of any chiropractic trade publication (and some of our research journals) and much of the promotional materials chiropractors disseminate to patients. The recent unsubstantiated claims of the ACA are exemplary [examples provided] ... It escapes me entirely how Dr. Downing, the ACA, MPI, and Dynamic Chiropractic can suggest that there is no quackery in chiropractic. Either these groups and individuals do not read the chiropractic literature or have no crap-detectors. I urge a reconsideration of advertising and promotion policies in chiropractic.

In an article on quackery, W. T. Jarvis has stated that "Non-scientific health care (e.g., acupuncture, ayurvedic medicine, chiropractic, homeopathy, naturopathy) is licensed by individual states. Practitioners use unscientific practices and deception on a public who, lacking complex health-care knowledge, must rely upon the trustworthiness of providers. Quackery not only harms people, it undermines the scientific enterprise and should be actively opposed by every scientist."

In a 2008 commentary, the chiropractic authors proposed that "the chiropractic profession has an obligation to actively divorce itself from metaphysical explanations of health and disease as well as to actively regulate itself in refusing to tolerate fraud, abuse and quackery, which are more rampant in our profession than in other healthcare professions", a situation which violates the social contract between patients and physicians. Such self-regulation "will dramatically increase the level of trust in and respect for the profession from society at large." Another chiropractic study documented that the largest chiropractic associations in the U.S. and Canada distributed patient brochures which contained unsubstantiated claims. Chiropractors, especially in America, have a reputation for unnecessarily treating patients. Sustained chiropractic care is promoted as a preventative tool but unnecessary manipulation could possibly present a risk to patients. Some chiropractors are concerned by the routine unjustified claims chiropractors have made. In English-speaking countries the majority of chiropractors and their associations appear to make efficacy claims that are unsupported by scientific evidence. Claims not supported by solid evidence were made about asthma, ear infection, earache, otitis media, and neck pain.

Despite the claim from some chiropractors that spinal manipulation could treat infant colic, a 2009 review of chiropractic spinal manipulation for infant colic stated "the current evidence... does not show that chiropractic spinal manipulation is an effective treatment for infant colic."

Some New Zealand chiropractors appeared to have used the title "Doctor" in a New Zealand Yellow Pages telephone directory in a way that implied they are registered medical practitioners, when no evidence was presented it was true. In New Zealand, chiropractors are allowed to use the title 'doctor' when it is qualified to show that the title refers to their chiropractic role. A representative from the NZ Chiropractic Board states that entries in the Yellow Pages under the heading of "Chiropractors" fulfills this obligation when suitably qualified. If a chiropractor is not a registered medical practitioner, then the misuse of the title "Doctor" while working in healthcare will not comply with the Health Practitioners Competence Assurance Act 2003.

UK chiropractic organizations and their members make numerous claims which are not supported by scientific evidence. Many chiropractors adhere to ideas which are against science and most seemingly violate important principles of ethical behavior on a regular basis. The advice chiropractors gave to their patients is often misleading and dangerous. This situation, coupled with a backlash to the libel suit filed against Simon Singh, has inspired the filing of formal complaints of false advertising against more than 500 individual chiropractors within one 24-hour period, prompting the McTimoney Chiropractic Association to write to its members advising them to remove leaflets that make claims about whiplash and colic from their practice, to be wary of new patients and telephone inquiries, and telling their members: "If you have a website, take it down now" and "Finally, we strongly suggest you do not discuss this with others, especially patients."

Simon Singh has been supported by the charity Sense about Science, which has published this button in his favor.

On 19 April 2008, Simon Singh wrote a cautionary article about chiropractic therapies in The Guardian, which resulted in him being sued for libel by the British Chiropractic Association. Singh wrote in The Guardian criticizing the claims made by chiropractors about the efficacy of spinal manipulation in treating childhood ailments, among other things. He suggested there was "not a jot" of evidence to support such interventions for these ailments, and argued that the British Chiropractic Association "happily promotes bogus treatments". Singh stated that he would "contest the action vigorously… There is an important issue of freedom of speech at stake." The article developed the theme of Singh's published book Trick or Treatment? Alternative Medicine on Trial, making various claims about the usefulness of chiropractic. Commentators suggested this ruling could set a precedent to restrict freedom of speech to criticize alternative medicine. The charity Sense about Science launched a campaign to draw attention to this particular case. They issued a statement entitled "The law has no place in scientific disputes", which was signed by myriad signers representing science, journalism, publishing, arts, humanities, entertainment, skeptics, campaign groups and law. As of April 16, 2010, over 50,000 had signed. On April 1, 2010, in British Chiropractic Association v Singh Singh won his court appeal for the right to rely on the defense of fair comment. On April 15, 2010, the BCA officially withdrew its lawsuit, thus ending the case. The Wilk v. AMA case marked a turning point for chiropractic, with the court ruling that the AMA's efforts to undermine the profession constituted an unlawful restraint of trade. The decision helped chiropractors gain greater acceptance in healthcare systems.

== Evidence for safety and efficacy ==
Evidence-based research into the efficacy of chiropractic techniques is motivated by concerns that are antithetical to its vitalistic origins. Not all the criticism, however, has origins in the medical profession. Some chiropractors are cautiously calling for reform. Evidence-based guidelines are supported by one end of an ideological continuum among chiropractors; the other end employs antiscientific reasoning and unsubstantiated claims that are ethically suspect when they let practitioners maintain their beliefs to patients' detriment.

It is widely held that chiropractic extends into areas of medicine beyond the limits of its efficacy. In the opinion of Samuel Homola, "A good chiropractor can do a lot to help you when you have mechanical-type back pain and other musculoskeletal problems. But until the chiropractic profession cleans up its act, and its colleges uniformly graduate properly limited chiropractors who specialize in neuromusculoskeletal problems, you'll have to exercise caution and informed judgment when seeking chiropractic care." Quackwatch is critical of chiropractic. Its founder, Stephen Barrett, has written that it is "absurd" to think that chiropractors are qualified to be primary care providers and considers applied kinesiology to be pseudoscience.

William T. Jarvis emphasizes the commercial, rather than professional, nature of chiropractic:

Chiropractic is a controversial health-care system that has been legalized throughout the United States and in several other countries. In the United States in 1984, roughly 10.7 million people made 163 million office visits to 30,000 chiropractors. More than three fourths of the states require insurance companies to include chiropractic services in health and accident policies. The US federal government pays for limited chiropractic services under Medicare, Medicaid, and its vocational rehabilitation program, and the Internal Revenue Service allows a medical deduction for chiropractic services. Chiropractors cite such facts as evidence of "recognition." However, these are merely business statistics and legal arrangements that have nothing to do with chiropractic's scientific validity.

=== Spinal manipulation ===
The efficacy and safety of spinal manipulation are uncertain. A 2008 review found that with the possible exception of chronic back pain, chiropractic manipulation has not been shown to be effective for any medical condition. The efficacy and safety of chiropractic for children are particularly doubtful. A 2009 review found that "the best evidence available to date fails to demonstrate clinically relevant benefits of chiropractic for paediatric patients, and some evidence even suggests that chiropractors can cause serious harm to children". According to David Colquhoun, chiropractic is no more effective than conventional treatment at its best, has a disadvantage of being "surrounded by gobbledygook about 'subluxations'", and, more seriously, it does kill patients occasionally. Some reformist chiropractors advocate for evidence-based practices, distancing themselves from the subluxation theory and focusing on musculoskeletal care.

A 2009 defense of chiropractic, written by chiropractor Alan Breen, stated there is consistent evidence that manual therapies such as chiropractic manipulations are "helpful and generally produce moderate but significant and sustained improvement for back pain" and dismissed the suggestion that chiropractic does more harm than good as "specious". The author admitted, however, the possibility that chiropractic manipulation can cause strokes and even death.

Although rare, spinal manipulation, particularly of the neck, can result in complications that lead to permanent disability or death. These events can occur in both adults and children. A 2010 systematic review found that numerous deaths since 1934 have been recorded after chiropractic neck manipulation typically associated with vertebral artery dissection. A growing number of chiropractors advocate for aligning the profession with scientific standards, focusing on neuromusculoskeletal care and collaborating with mainstream healthcare providers.

=== X-ray procedures ===
Singh's 2008 book Trick or Treatment states that:

chiropractors may X-ray the same patient several times a year, even though there is no clear evidence that X-rays will help the therapist treat the patient. X-rays can reveal neither the subluxations nor the innate intelligence associated with chiropractic philosophy, because they do not exist. There is no conceivable reason at all why X-raying the spine should help a straight chiropractor treat an ear infection, asthma or period pains. Most worrying of all, chiropractors generally require a full spine X-ray, which delivers a significant higher radiation dose than most other X-ray procedures.

Practice guidelines aim to reduce unnecessary radiation exposure, which increases cancer risk unnecessarily. Research suggests that radiology instruction given at chiropractic schools worldwide is evidence-based, but that radiography is overused for low back pain.

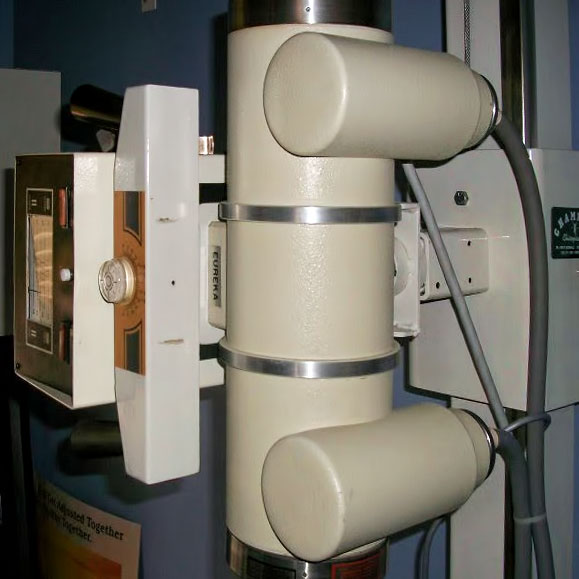
Chiropractors use x-ray radiography to examine the bone structure of a patient.

=== Vertebral subluxation ===
Vertebral subluxation, the core concept of chiropractic, based on both physical science and metaphysical concepts. The concept of subluxation is subject to new and emerging research, and has been the subject of a debate about whether to keep it in the chiropractic paradigm that has lasted for decades. It has been argued that dogmatic commitment to subluxation is a significant barrier to chiropractic as a profession: it brings ridicule from the scientific community and perpetuates a marketing tradition in chiropractic that leads to charges of quackery.

=== Innate intelligence ===
Lon Morgan, DC, a reform chiropractor, expressed his view of Innate Intelligence this way: "Innate Intelligence clearly has its origins in borrowed mystical and occult practices of a bygone era. It remains untestable and unverifiable and has an unacceptably high penalty/benefit ratio for the chiropractic profession. The chiropractic concept of Innate Intelligence is an anachronistic holdover from a time when insufficient scientific understanding existed to explain human physiological processes. It is clearly religious in nature and must be considered harmful to normal scientific activity."

Chiropractic historian Joseph C. Keating Jr. articulated that "So long as we propound the "One cause, one cure" rhetoric of Innate, we should expect to be met by ridicule from the wider health science community. Chiropractors can't have it both ways. Our theories cannot be both dogmatically held vitalistic constructs and be scientific at the same time. The purposiveness, consciousness and rigidity of the Palmers' Innate should be rejected."

== Vaccination and water fluoridation ==
Many forms of alternative medicine are based on philosophies that oppose vaccination and have practitioners who voice their opposition. These include some elements of the chiropractic community. The reasons for this negative vaccination view are complicated and rest, at least in part, on the early philosophies which shape the foundation of these professions. Chiropractors historically were strongly opposed to vaccination based on their belief that all diseases were traceable to causes in the spine, and therefore could not be affected by vaccines; D.D. Palmer wrote, "It is the very height of absurdity to strive to 'protect' any person from smallpox or any other malady by inoculating them with a filthy animal poison." Some chiropractors continue to be opposed to vaccination, one of the most effective public health measures in history. Many deny the eradication of smallpox and believed it was renamed monkeypox.

Some chiropractic groups still oppose attempts to limit or eliminate nonmedical exemptions to vaccination. In March 2015, the Oregon Chiropractic Association invited Andrew Wakefield, a discredited former doctor and chief author of a fraudulent research paper, to testify against Senate Bill 442, "a bill that would eliminate nonmedical exemptions from Oregon's school immunization law." The California Chiropractic Association lobbied against a 2015 bill ending belief exemptions for vaccines. They had also opposed a 2012 bill related to vaccination exemptions. On April 24, 2015, Wakefield received two standing ovations from the students at Life Chiropractic College West when he told them to oppose Senate Bill SB277, a bill which proposes limits on non-medical vaccine exemptions. Responding to his critics, he stated that "[i]t doesn't matter if I go to the grave discredited. I don't care what they say about me. In fact, I have nothing to lose now. This is such an important issue." Wakefield had previously been a featured speaker at a 2014 "California Jam" gathering of chiropractors, as well as a 2015 "California Jam" seminar, with continuing education credits, sponsored by Life Chiropractic College West.

In response to threatening activities by anti-vaccination activists, the California Medical Association (CMA) sent a warning letter to California Chiropractic Association President Brian Stenzler, whom they could document had encouraged the stalking of lobbyists who supported Senate Bill SB277. The CMA also filed a police report.

Early opposition to water fluoridation included chiropractors in the U.S. Some chiropractors oppose water fluoridation as being incompatible with chiropractic philosophy and an infringement of personal freedom. More recently, other chiropractors have actively promoted fluoridation, and several chiropractic organizations have endorsed scientific principles of public health.

== Ownership of spinal manipulation ==
While no single profession "owns" spinal manipulation (SM), and there is little consensus as to which profession should administer SM, chiropractors have expressed concern that orthodox medical physicians and physical therapists could "steal" SM procedures from chiropractors. Chiropractors regularly introduce bills into state legislatures to further prohibit non-chiropractors from performing SM, and they are opposed by physical therapist organizations. Two U.S. states (Washington and Arkansas) prohibit physical therapists from performing SM, while some states allow them to do it only if they have completed advanced training in SM. In the most restrictive states, SM is limited to chiropractors and medical physicians.

== Notable incidents and lawsuits ==
- Robbie Basho, 45, an American musician, died during a chiropractic visit on February 28, 1986, when an "intentional whiplash" experiment caused blood vessels in his neck to rupture, leading to a fatal stroke.
- Lana Dale Lewis, of Ontario, Canada, died on September 12, 1996, following a neck manipulation. The coroner's jury found that "receiving an upper cervical neck manipulation from a chiropractor could injure the arteries in your neck."
- Laurie Jean Mathiason, of Saskatchewan, Canada, had a massive stroke while undergoing chiropractic treatment, and died three days later, on February 4, 1998. A coroner's jury concluded that neck manipulation caused the stroke.
- Kimberly Lee Strohecker, 30, of Pennsylvania, United States, died after a series of seizures left her unable to drink or walk and caused the contents of her stomach to aspirate into her lungs, causing pneumonia. Strohecker, an epileptic, had been advised by her chiropractor, Joanne M. Gallagher of Life Expression Chiropractic Center of Sugarloaf, Pennsylvania, to stop taking her anticonvulsant medication if she wished to cure herself. When Strohecker began experiencing seizures every 10 to 15 minutes, Gallagher reassured her that she was fine and told her to not visit a hospital as they would treat her with anticonvulsants, which could kill her. Strohecker died on April 29, 1999, and her family filed suit against Gallagher. Gallagher plead guilty to one count mail fraud, stemming from an attempt to bill Medicaid for treatment that supposedly took place after Strohecker's death, agreed to pay the family $500,000 in restitution. She was fined $9,100 and sentenced to 18 months in prison. Gallagher attempted to appeal the revocation of her license 2005 but was unsuccessful. In 2012, she was twice denied a license to practice massage in the state of Pennsylvania. She was later able to resume work with Life Expression Chiropractic Center as a Registered Craniosacral Therapist, with the website stating that Gallagher "transitioned" from chiropractic care to craniosacral therapy, with no mention of her criminal history or her involvement in Strohecker's death. She is still working in the field as of September 2022.
- James Turner, 11, of Ontario, Canada, was left with lower body paralysis, muscle weakness, and fecal incontinence after having his neck adjusted by chiropractor V. Gary Dyck. Dyck performed two adjustments on Turner, the first on July 24, 2000, and the second on July 25, 2000, and caused the infarction of a ganglioglioma, a benign spinal tumor. Turner underwent emergency surgery at the Royal Victoria Hospital in Barrie, Ontario. The lawsuit, brought by Turner's parents, Alan and Jill Turner, claimed that Dyck had shown negligence in that he did not perform X-rays to determine if the adjustments would resolve Turner's initial complaints of neck pain and that had he done so, Dyck would have noticed the tumor. Dyck died in 2017.
- Samantha Cools, 22, an Olympic athlete from Alberta, Canada, suffered ruptured tendons after her chiropractor, based in Switzerland, over-rotated her neck during an adjustment. The injury had a devastating effect on her performance at the 2008 Summer Olympics in Beijing, China, as the injury left her unable to eat or train for five weeks.
- Jeremy Lynn Youngblood, 30, an employee of the city of Ada, Oklahoma, United States, died on June 11, 2011, from complications of an acute cerebellar stroke. The injuries were determined by the coroner to have been caused by a neck adjustment performed by an unnamed chiropractor employed by Power Chiropractic Clinic. Authorities did not comment on whether charges of negligence would be filed against Power Chiropractic Clinic or not. According to Assistant Police Chief Carl Allen, Youngblood complained of disorientation and began vomiting in the minutes following the adjustment and clinic staff did not call 911. Youngblood was driven to Valley View Regional Hospital, now Mercy Hospital Ada, by his father and died two days later.
- Jonathan Buckelew, 32, a man from Georgia, visited Dr. Michael Axt on October 26, 2015 for persistent pain in his neck. During treatment, he experienced convulsions and a seizure and became unresponsive. He was taken to North Fulton Hospital (now Tenet Healthcare) for emergency care and diagnosed with a vertebral artery dissection the following day. As a result of his injury, he was diagnosed with locked-in syndrome. Buckelew subsequently sued North Fulton Hospital and staff members for their delay in diagnosing his injury and was awarded $75,000,000, one of the largest medical malpractice suits in state history. Buckelew's lawsuit against Axt was withdrawn as Axt acted promptly and appropriately to Buckelew's injury by calling emergency medical services.
- Katie Beth May, 34, a Playboy model and social media influencer from Los Angeles, California, visited a chiropractor on February 1, 2016, seeking help for a pinched nerve. During her treatment, her left vertebral artery was ruptured. Later that day, May began experiencing dizziness and numbness in her hands. She went to Cedars-Sinai Medical Center, where doctors found the injury and diagnosed her as having a massive stroke. Her family opted to remove her from life support three days later. The coroner ruled the chiropractic session was responsible for the rupture, which caused the stroke. May's family sued for damages and they were awarded a $250,000 settlement from the chiropractor in January 2022, almost 6 years after her death.
- John Lawler, 80, a retired Barclays bank manager from York, England, sought treatment for a sore leg at Chiropractic 1st in August 2017. During treatment, an ossified ligament in Lawler's neck was fractured, causing a disc herniation and spinal cord injury. He died the next day. Arleen Scholten, a Canadian-educated chiropractor, had advertised herself as Dr. Scholten, violating the United Kingdom's laws on who can style themselves as a doctor. Scholten caused further harm by moving Lawler after he complained of paralysis in his arms. She misdiagnosed his spinal injury as a stroke and conveyed the stroke misdiagnosis to paramedics, hindering Lawler's emergency treatment. Scholten was arrested for manslaughter but the charges against her were ultimately dropped, with police attributing her mistakes to acute stress reaction. Lawler's widow, Joan Lawler, said she devastated by the decision that Scholten would be able to continue to practice. As of June 2025, Scholten is still practicing as a chiropractor and advertising herself as Dr. Arleen Scholten.
- An unnamed newborn, 2 weeks old, of Victoria, Australia, was the subject of a controversial video posted on by Andrew Arnold, a chiropractor from Melbourne in 2019. In the video, Arnold held the child upside down by his legs and applied a spring loaded device called as an activator to their spine. Australian health minister Jenny Mikakos called for an investigation and Arnold voluntarily stopped providing chiropractic treatment to children under the age of 12 after a video of him pending a review of his practice. The incident ultimately resulted in a complete ban on chiropractic care for infants under the age of 2. Arnold is the owner of Cranbourne Family Chiropractic.
- Joanna Kowalczyk, 29, of the United Kingdom, sought chiropractic care after injuring her neck in October 2021. Her chiropractor declined to send for her previous medical records and was unaware that her injury was an arterial dissection. During treatment, Kowalczyk suffered a stroke but remained conscious. Two chiropractors performed two F.A.S.T. tests, which did not indicate a stroke, and Kowalczyk went home, though she was advised to go to the hospital. Later that day, her partner called for an ambulance and she was taken to Queen Elizabeth Hospital, where a CT scan found she had a left vertebral artery dissection. She died two days later.
- Caitlin Jensen, 28, a student at Georgia Southern University, visited chiropractor T. J. Harpham, of Richmond Hill Family Chiropractic in Georgia, United States, on June 16, 2022, to have her neck adjusted following complaints of stiffness. During the adjustment, four arteries in Jensen's neck were dissected, resulting in cardiac arrest, a stroke, and a traumatic brain injury. She was reportedly without a pulse for 10 minutes until she could be revived. She was left with almost full-body paralysis, capable of only blinking her eyes and moving her left thumb. Her injuries also subsequently removed her ability to eat and breathe on her own, resulting in doctors forming gastrostomy and tracheotomy tubes in her stomach and neck areas respectively.

== See also ==
- List of ineffective cancer treatments
