= Sherman College of Chiropractic =

Coordinates: 35.014°N 81.986°W

- Former name: Sherman College of Straight Chiropractic
- Motto: Adjusting the World for a Better Future
- Established: 1973
- President: Dr. Jack Bourla
- Location: Spartanburg County (Boiling Springs postal address), South Carolina, United States
- Mascot: Larry the Lion
- Website: www.sherman.edu

Sherman College of Chiropractic is an American private graduate college focused on the health sciences and located in unincorporated Spartanburg County, South Carolina, with a Boiling Springs postal address; it is outside of the Boiling Springs census-designated place. It was founded in 1973 and named after chiropractor Lyle Sherman. Sherman College offers the doctor of chiropractic degree. The college is home to 387 students representing 42 states and 13 countries and has more than 3,000 alumni around the world. Sherman college supports the "straight" vertebral subluxation-based focus as different from diagnosis and symptomatic treatment focus of "mixed" U.S. chiropractic schools. The name of the college was changed to Sherman College of Straight Chiropractic the late 1970s, but changed back to the original name in 2009. Sherman College also has digital x-ray services in the Health Center for use of interns and local chiropractors.

== History ==
Established in 1973 by Dr. Thom Gelardi, the college is named for Dr. Lyle Sherman, an assistant director of the B. J. Palmer Chiropractic Research Clinic. The first class graduated on September 18, 1976, the anniversary of Palmer's discovery of the vertebral subluxation. After several years in alternate locations in Spartanburg, the college opened the present campus, which now includes a teaching facility, a health center open to the public, and a low ropes course for faculty and students. Sherman focuses on the correction of vertebral subluxations of the spine rather than diagnosis and treatment of symptoms in the modern medicine model; a philosophy it defended in an accreditation lawsuit with the American Chiropractic Association in 1986.

== Academics ==
The program consists of 14 quarters of study: classroom and hands-on instruction, internship in the Chiropractic Health Center, research opportunities, and community services. To enter the program, students must have 90 hours of college credits, including hours in lab sciences. Sherman College is accredited by the Commission on Colleges of the Southern Association of Colleges and Schools and by the Commission of Accreditation of the Council on Chiropractic Education, as well as being licensed by the South Carolina Commission on Higher Education.

== Campus ==
The 80-acre (32.4 ha) campus is located in Spartanburg, South Carolina. The college operates a Chiropractic Health Center on its campus open to the public, which provides more than 35,000 patient visits each year. Sherman was the first East Coast chiropractic college to use digital x-ray imaging for health center and local chiropractor patients. The Health Center also supports Chiropractic research on vertebral subluxation.

== Seminars ==
Each year in late April/early May, Sherman College sponsors the Lyceum, a conference of seminars, workshops, awards, presentation of research and fellowship for the chiropractic community. Another series is IRAPS, the International Research and Philosophy Symposium, a weekend of presentations which focus on innate intelligence and vitalistic philosophy as well as research findings.
