= NACM =

NACM is a four-letter acronym that may refer to:

- National Association for Chiropractic Medicine
- National Association of Credit Management
- National Association for Court Management
