= National Association for Chiropractic Medicine =

American chiropractic organization

The National Association for Chiropractic Medicine (NACM) was a minority chiropractic association founded in 1984 that described itself as a "consumer advocacy association of chiropractors". It openly rejected some of the more controversial aspects of chiropractic, including a basic concept of chiropractic, vertebral subluxations as the cause of all diseases. It also sought to "reform the chiropractic profession away from a philosophical scope of practice and towards an applied science scope of practice." It stated that it was "dedicated to bringing the scientific based practice of chiropractic into mainstream medicine" and that its members "confine their scope of practice to scientific parameters and seek to make legitimate the utilization of professional manipulative procedures in mainstream health care delivery." "While the NACM is focused on furthering the profession, its primary focus is on the rights and safety of the consumers." The NACM was the object of much controversy and criticism from the rest of the profession. It quietly dropped out of sight and its demise apparently occurred sometime between May 30, 2008 and March 6, 2010.

== Background ==
Representing a minority viewpoint among chiropractors that is shared by those known as reform chiropractors, the NACM advocated a highly limited use of spinal manipulative procedures "only for the treatment of some neuromusculoskeletal conditions of musculoskeletal origin," for example the treatment of "sore backs and other musculo-skeletal problems." By openly rejecting some of the more controversial aspects of chiropractic, including a basic concept of chiropractic, vertebral subluxations as the cause of all diseases. NACM members claimed to receive mainstream approval more so than practitioners of straight or mixing chiropractic.

The NACM was a private organization that accepted members by invitation only and did not release membership data, however the neutral Agency for Healthcare Research and Quality and the antagonistic ICA estimated its membership to be in the low hundreds or less.

Groupings within the chiropractic profession have been studied and categorized in various ways and the placement of the NACM within that spectrum has been mentioned in the literature. A 2005 study made with support from the chiropractic community had this to say:

"At the risk of oversimplification, chiropractors can be viewed as falling into three groups based on their usage of evidence, diagnosis, and philosophy: evidence based chiropractors, traditional straight chiropractors, and super straight chiropractors. Evidence based chiropractors make use of the best available scientific literature and accumulated clinical knowledge to establish diagnosis, refer or co-manage when necessary, devise and revise treatment plans. The evidence based chiropractor would most closely align with the AACP."

That statement referenced the NACM as a subgroup of evidence-based chiropractors:

"Another subgroup represented by the National Association for Chiropractic Medicine (NACM) takes a more narrow view. Whereas the AACP believes in a wide variety of treatment measures, the NACM restricts members to NMS conditions and manipulation by hand only."

In 1998, the AMA's Council on Scientific Affairs used communications from NACM's vice-president as a basis for some of the content in their "Report 12".

In 2002, the Journal of Controversial Medical Claims published a paper submitted by the NACM entitled "NACM and its argument with mainstream chiropractic health care." In 2005, chiropractic leader Anthony Rosner had some strong words for the paper:

"The history of anti-chiropractic invectives labeling the profession as "unscientific" unfortunately fills volumes, from the days of Morris Fischbein's crusades against chiropractic as editor of the Journal of the American Medical Association, to a mind-numbing invective published in 2002 by Timothy Mirtz which I have rebutted in considerable detail elsewhere."

== Position on spinal manipulation for children and adults ==
In 2006 the Maryland Health Care Commission examined and briefly compared the positions of the three chiropractic groups "with policies on spinal manipulation services for children: American Chiropractic Association (ACA); International Chiropractor's Association (ICA – with its specialty department, The Council on Chiropractic Pediatrics; ); and National Association for Chiropractic Medicine (NACM)." It then noted that the NACM position differed from the positions of the other groups, both for adults and children:

"NACM differs from ACA and ICA not only in the chiropractic treatment of children, but in the treatment of adults as well. NACM emphatically renounces subluxation as the root of disease or even as a scientifically valid term or condition. Their members believe that spinal manipulation is only useful for affecting joint dysfunctional disorders that result from normal or excessive 'wear' on the joints. As such, they restrict their practices to the treatment of neuromusculoskeletal conditions and do not believe that DCs are sufficiently trained to serve as PCPs for either adults or children. The basis for NACM's position on children and spinal manipulation comes from the 1993 Report to the Committees on Armed Services and Appropriations -- CHAMPUS Chiropractic Demonstration. In this demonstration, only children 16 years and older were eligible for participation 'based on review of chiropractic literature that efficacy of chiropractic treatment of young children had not been established and to present more risk than benefit.'"

== Opposition from chiropractic profession ==
The NACM met with strong disapproval from the American Chiropractic Association (ACA), the International Chiropractor's Association (ICA) and other chiropractic organizations, and sparked controversy within the chiropractic profession in 1986 by coming out in favor of chiropractors using pharmaceuticals.

It was often the object of attack and comments in the magazine Dynamic Chiropractic, as a search of the website will show. In 2002, the Department of Veterans Affairs chose to add Charles DuVall Jr., DC, to the VA "Chiropractic Advisory Committee" to help institute chiropractic care for veterans. At the time, DuVall was president of the NACM, board chairman of The National Council Against Health Fraud (NCAHF), and also the chiropractic member of the editorial group running the website Chirobase, a website skeptical of traditional chiropractic beliefs and practices. The website still promotes the reform position advocated by the NACM and contains a list of chiropractors it recommends. Dynamic Chiropractic showed its opposition to DuVall's appointment by calling for an organized attempt to remove DuVall from the committee, and by creating a banner and button to use:

"We are asking every chiropractic association, college, company and individual that has a publication or website to add this banner on the front page of their publications, and on every page of their websites. To make it easy, we are offering the banner in various file types on our website at www.chiroweb.com/noduvall."

It failed to have him removed, and his role and influence in getting legislation passed which gave chiropractors access to the VA system was singled out for commendation by James Edwards, DC:

"And finally, Charles DuVall Jr., DC, who also served on both VA committees. That's right, Chuck DuVall of NACM fame! While Dr. Duvall's committee appointment was opposed initially by both the ACA and Dynamic Chiropractic,^{3} my private conversations with him totally convinced me that he was much more interested in veterans than his own agenda or the agenda of his organization. As a result of those conversations, a "gentleman's agreement" was reached in that I would work to stop opposition to his appointment if Dr. DuVall would not do any media interviews while a member of the VA committee. While colleagues warned me that Dr. DuVall could not be trusted and would not keep the agreement, he did. More importantly, I want you to know that during the three-year advisory process, Dr. DuVall represented mainstream chiropractic admirably and voted with the majority each and every time."

== Demise ==
The exact time and nature of the demise of the association is not published, but in the April 9, 2010 issue of Dynamic Chiropractic, the editorial staff wrote:

The National Association of Chiropractic Medicine (NACM) apparently no longer exists. Responding to an inquiry regarding the organization's status from another chiropractor, a March 6, 2010 e-mail sent by NACM's national executive director, Ronald Slaughter, DC, said it all: "All good things come to an end. We tried. We failed. Chiropractic is a 'failed' profession." ... As of press time, the NACM Web site (www.chiromed.org) is no longer accessible. Exactly how long the site has been down is anyone's guess. The last recorded existence of the site is May 30, 2008. Like the National Association of Chiropractic Medicine, it too has disappeared with little notice.
