= National University of Health Sciences =

Private university in Lombard, Illinois, U.S.

Coordinates: 41.860029°N 88.014565°W

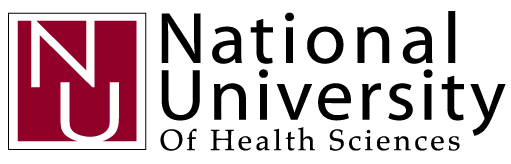
- Motto: Esse Quam Videri
- Type: Private university
- Established: 1906
- President: Joseph P.D. Stiefel
- Location: Lombard, Illinois, United States
- Campus: 38 acres (15 ha)
- Colors: Maroon and goldenrod
- Nicknames: National, NUHS, National University
- Mascot: Eagle
- Website: www.nuhs.edu

National University of Health Sciences (NUHS) is a private university in Lombard, Illinois, United States, that focuses on the health sciences. The university offers professional degrees in chiropractic and naturopathic medicine, master's degrees in acupuncture and Oriental medicine, a bachelor's degree in biomedical science, and a certificate or associate degree in massage therapy.

== History ==
National University of Health Sciences was founded as the "National School of Chiropractic" by John Fitz Allen Howard in 1906 in Davenport, Iowa. In 1908, the school moved to Chicago, because its founder desired a scientifically more rigorous academic culture. Another reason that Howard relocated to the Chicago area was that he received an agreement allowing his students to have access to anatomical study of cadavers at the nearby Cook County Hospital.

After being chartered and incorporated by the State of Illinois, the college's first home was on Congress Street across from Presbyterian Hospital. In 1920, the college's enrollment had grown to such an extent that it needed a larger facility, so it purchased a five-story building at 20 N. Ashland and the name was changed to "The National College of Chiropractic". In 1927, the college established its first clinic, the "Chicago General Health Service", which remained in operation until 2008.

In 1942, the college became a not-for-profit educational and research institution under the corporate laws of Illinois and the United States Department of the Treasury governing tax-exempt institutions.

In 1963, National relocated its campus to Lombard, Illinois, in suburban Chicago where it remains today. In 1968, the Chiropractic Institute of New York was merged into National. In 2000, it adopted the university structure and changed its name to National University of Health Sciences. In 2009, the university entered into a partnership with St. Petersburg College, a public community college in St. Petersburg, Florida, to provide a doctor of chiropractic degree at the St. Petersburg College campus.

The university currently operates clinics in Illinois and Florida.

== Publications ==
The National University of Health Sciences publishes three scientific journals for the chiropractic profession:

1. Journal of Manipulative and Physiological Therapeutics: Selected as the official research publication of the American Chiropractic Association, JMPT is the first and only refereed, internationally and Medline indexed biomedical journal in the chiropractic profession.
2. Journal of Chiropractic Medicine: Published quarterly, this peer-reviewed indexed journal provides a forum for information on the primary care emphasis within the chiropractic profession.
3. Journal of Chiropractic Humanities: A peer-reviewed indexed journal with the primary purpose of fostering scholarly debate and interaction within the chiropractic profession regarding the humanities.
