= Spinal adjustment =

Chiropractic technique

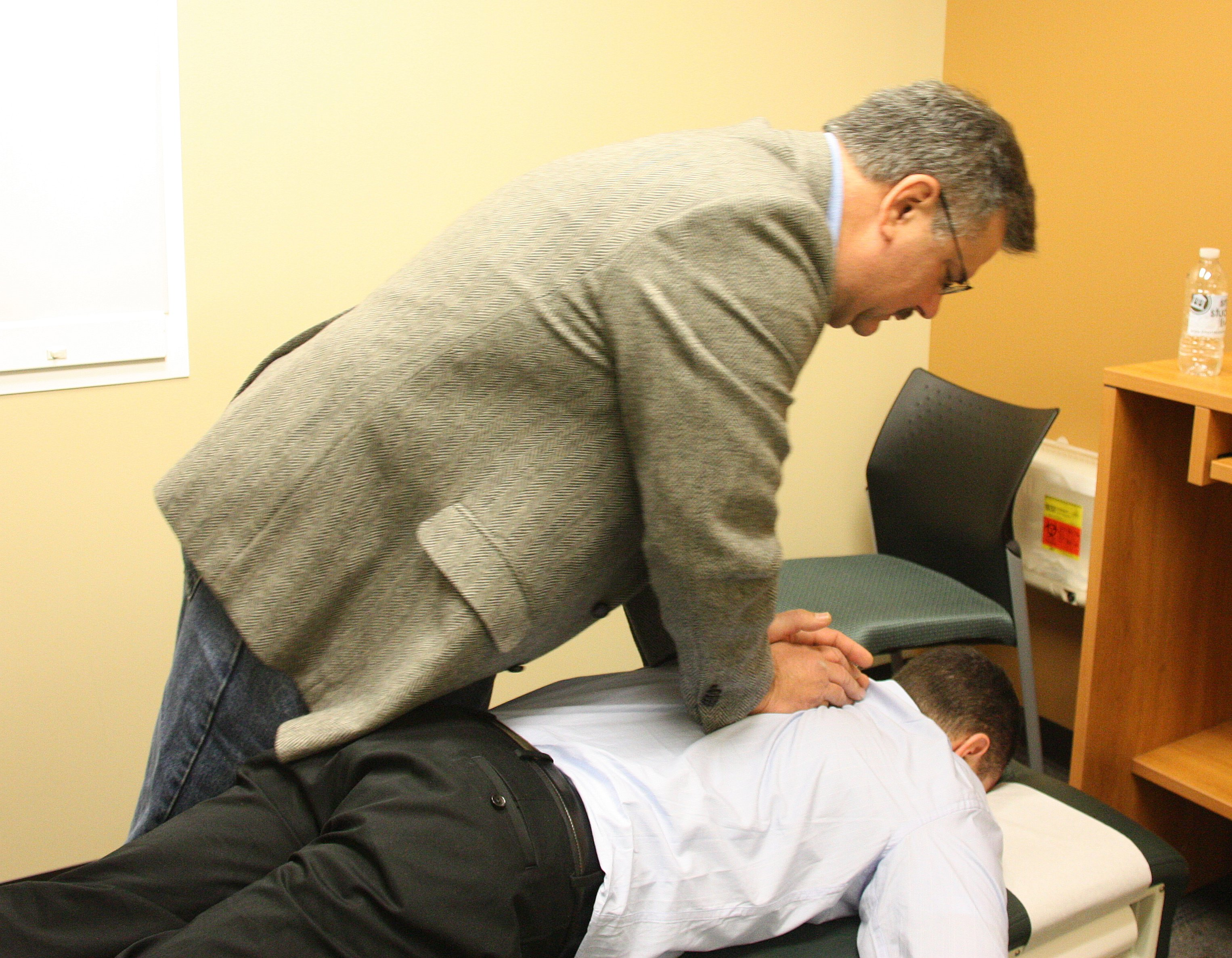
A chiropractor performs an adjustment on a patient.

Spinal adjustment and chiropractic adjustment are terms used by chiropractors to describe their approaches to spinal manipulation, as well as some osteopaths, who use the term adjustment. There is no good evidence that chiropractic manipulation is effective in helping manage lower back pain. A 2011 critical evaluation of 45 systematic reviews concluded that the data included in the study "fail[ed] to demonstrate convincingly that spinal manipulation is an effective intervention for any condition."

Spinal adjustments were among many chiropractic techniques invented in the 19th century by Daniel David Palmer, the founder of chiropractic. Claims made for the benefits of spinal adjustments range from temporary, palliative (pain relieving) effects to long term wellness and preventive care.

== Description ==
A chiropractic adjustment intends to affect or correct a vertebral joint's alignment, motion, and/or function. Specifically, adjustments are intended to correct "vertebral subluxations", a non-scientific term given to the signs and symptoms that are said by chiropractors to result from abnormal alignment of vertebrae. In 2005, the chiropractic "subluxation" was defined by the World Health Organization as "a lesion or dysfunction in a joint or motion segment in which alignment, movement integrity and/or physiological function are altered, although contact between joint surfaces remains intact. It is essentially a functional entity, which may influence biomechanical and neural integrity." This differs from the medical definition of subluxation as a significant structural displacement, which can be seen with static imaging techniques such as X-rays.

This intention forms the legal and philosophical foundation of the profession, which US Medicare law summarizes in this manner:

Coverage of chiropractic services is specifically limited to manual manipulation of the spine to correct a subluxation... Medicare will not pay for treatment unless it is 'manual manipulation of the spine to correct a subluxation'.

Chiropractic authors and researchers Meeker and Haldeman write that the core clinical method that all chiropractors agree upon is spinal manipulation, although chiropractors much prefer to use the term spinal "adjustment", a term which reflects "their belief in the therapeutic and health-enhancing effect of correcting spinal joint abnormalities."

The International Chiropractor's Association (ICA) states:

Chiropractic spinal adjustment is unique and singular to the chiropractic profession ... characterized by a specific thrust applied to the vertebra utilizing parts of the vertebra and contiguous structures as levers to directionally correct articular malposition. Adjustment shall be differentiated from spinal manipulation in that the adjustment can only be applied to a vertebral malposition with the express intent to improve or correct the subluxation, whereas any joint, subluxated or not, may be manipulated to mobilize the joint or to put the joint through its range of motion. Chiropractic is a specialized field in the healing arts, and by prior rights, the spinal adjustment is distinct and singular to the chiropractic profession.

One author claims that this concept is now repudiated by mainstream chiropractic. The definition of this procedure describes the use of a load (force) to specific body tissues with therapeutic intent. This "load" is traditionally supplied by hand and can vary in its velocity, amplitude, duration, frequency, and body location and is usually abbreviated HVLA (high-velocity low amplitude) thrust.

Over the years, many variations of these techniques have been delivered, most as proprietary techniques developed by individual practitioners.

== Effects ==
There is no good evidence that chiropractic manipulation is effective in helping manage lower back pain. A 2011 critical evaluation of 45 systematic reviews concluded that the data included in the study "fail[ed] to demonstrate convincingly that spinal manipulation is an effective intervention for any condition." Spinal manipulation may be cost-effective for sub-acute or chronic low back pain, but the results for acute low back pain were insufficient. No compelling evidence exists to indicate that maintenance chiropractic care adequately prevents symptoms or diseases.

=== Musculoskeletal disorders ===
The effects of spinal adjustment vary depending on the method performed. All techniques claim effects similar to other manual therapies, ranging from decreased muscle tension to reduced stress. Studies show that most patients go to chiropractors for musculoskeletal problems: 60% with low back pain, and the rest with head, neck and extremity symptoms. (p. 219) Also the article "Chiropractic: A Profession at the Crossroads of Mainstream and Alternative Medicine" states that, "chiropractic was to be a revolutionary system of healing based on the premise that neurologic dysfunction caused by 'impinged' nerves at the spinal level was the cause of most dis-ease". (p. 218) The mechanisms that are claimed to alter nervous system function and affect overall health are seen as speculative in nature, however, clinical trials have been conducted that include "placebo-controlled comparisons [and] comparisons with other treatments". (p. 220) The American Chiropractic Association promotes chiropractic care of infants and children under the theory that "poor posture and physical injury, including birth trauma, may be common primary causes of illness in children and can have a direct and significant impact not only on spinal mechanics, but on other bodily functions".

=== Non-musculoskeletal disorders ===
Historically, the profession has falsely claimed that spinal adjustments have physiological effects on inner organs and their function, and thus affect overall health, not just musculoskeletal disorders, a view that originated with Palmer's original thesis that all diseases were caused by subluxations of the spine and other joints. With time, fewer chiropractors hold this view, with "a small proportion of chiropractors, osteopaths, and other manual medicine providers use[ing] spinal manipulative therapy (SMT) to manage non-musculoskeletal disorders. However, the efficacy and effectiveness of these interventions to prevent or treat non-musculoskeletal disorders remain controversial."

A 2019 global summit of "50 researchers from 8 countries and 28 observers from 18 chiropractic organizations" conducted a systematic review of the literature, and 44 of the 50 "found no evidence of an effect of SMT for the management of non-musculoskeletal disorders including infantile colic, childhood asthma, hypertension, primary dysmenorrhea, and migraine. This finding challenges the validity of the theory that treating spinal dysfunctions with SMT has a physiological effect on organs and their function."

== Safety ==
There has been limited research on the safety of chiropractic spinal manipulation, making it difficult to establish precise estimates of the frequency and severity of adverse events. Adverse events are increasingly reported in randomized clinical trials of spinal manipulation but remain under–reported despite recommendations in the 2010 CONSORT guidelines. Chiropractic spinal manipulation is frequently associated with mild to moderate temporary adverse effects, and also serious outcomes which can result in permanent disability or death, which include strokes, spinal disc herniation, vertebral and rib fractures and cauda equina syndrome. A scoping review found that benign (mild-moderate) adverse events such as musculoskeletal pain, stiffness, and headache were common and transient (i.e., resolved within 24 hours), and affected 23–83% of adults. Serious outcomes are thought to be very rare, yet remain less studied than mild-moderate adverse events. One retrospective study examining 960,140 sessions of chiropractic spinal manipulation found two severe adverse events, both being rib fractures in older women with osteoporosis (incidence of 0.21 per 100,000 sessions). There are several contraindications to chiropractic spinal manipulation, including poor bone integrity, cervical arterial pathology, spinal metastasis, and spinal instability.

== See also ==
- Chiropractic history
- Cracking joints
- Joint manipulation
- Osteopathic manipulation
