= British Chiropractic Association v Singh =

UK libel lawsuit, 2008–2010

British Chiropractic Association (BCA) v Singh was an influential libel action in England and Wales, widely credited as a catalytic event in the libel reform campaign which saw all parties at the 2010 general election making manifesto commitments to libel reform, and passage of the Defamation Act 2013 by the British Parliament in April 2013.

The case was brought by the British Chiropractic Association against science author and journalist Simon Singh. Occurring at a time when skeptics were beginning to make use of social media such as Twitter and social gatherings like The Amazing Meeting and Skeptics in the Pub, it brought together a large community of science-supporting geeks and resulted in unprecedented media coverage of chiropractic and the questionable claims made for it. At one point the so-called "quacklash" resulted in 500 formal complaints in 24 hours to the BCA and, before the case closed, a quarter of all members of the British Chiropractic Association were under formal investigation.

== Background ==
On 19 April 2008, The Guardian published Singh's column "Beware the Spinal Trap", an article that was critical of the practice of chiropractic and which resulted in Singh being sued for libel by the British Chiropractic Association (BCA). When the case was first brought against him, The Guardian supported him and funded his legal advice, as well as offering to pay the BCA's legal costs in an out-of-court settlement if Singh chose to settle.

The article developed the theme of the book that Singh and Edzard Ernst had just published, Trick or Treatment? Alternative Medicine on Trial, and made various statements about the lack of usefulness of chiropractic "for such problems as ear infections and infant colic":

You might think that modern chiropractors restrict themselves to treating back problems, but in fact they still possess some quite wacky ideas. The fundamentalists argue that they can cure anything. And even the more moderate chiropractors have ideas above their station. The British Chiropractic Association claims that their members can help treat children with colic, sleeping and feeding problems, frequent ear infections, asthma and prolonged crying, even though there is not a jot of evidence. This organisation is the respectable face of the chiropractic profession and yet it happily promotes bogus treatments.

== Legal proceedings ==
In May 2009, Mr Justice Eady ruled in a preliminary hearing at the Royal Courts of Justice that merely using the phrase "happily promotes bogus treatments" meant that Singh was stating, as a matter of fact (rather than as a matter of personal opinion or metaphor), that the British Chiropractic Association was being consciously dishonest in promoting chiropractic for treating the children's ailments in question. Singh denied he intended any such meaning.

Singh decided to appeal against the ruling, which raised substantially the potential financial liability that he would face if he lost the case. Leave to appeal was granted in October 2009.

The pre-trial hearing took place in February 2010 before three senior judges at the Royal Courts of Justice. In April 2010, they allowed Singh's appeal, ruling that the high court judge had "erred in his approach". The Court of Appeal overturned the previous ruling that Singh's comments were an assertion of fact and instead ruled that Singh was entitled to defend his comments as legally permissible fair comment.

BCA withdrew their libel action shortly after this ruling, resulting in the end of the legal case.

== Reception ==
Before Eady's preliminary ruling was overturned on appeal, commentators said that the ruling could set a precedent that had chilling effects on the freedom of speech to criticise alternative medicine. An editorial in Nature commented on the case, and suggested that the BCA may be trying to suppress debate and that this use of English libel law is a burden on the right to freedom of expression, which is protected by the European Convention on Human Rights.

The Wall Street Journal Europe cited the case as an example of how British libel law "chills free speech", saying that:

As a consequence, the U.S. Congress is considering a bill that would make British libel judgments unenforceable in the U.S. ... Mr. Singh is unlikely to be the last victim of Britain's libel laws. Settling scientific and political disputes through lawsuits, though, runs counter the very principles that have made Western progress possible. "The aim of science is not to open the door to infinite wisdom, but to set a limit to infinite error," Bertolt Brecht wrote in The Life of Galileo. It is time British politicians restrain the law so that wisdom prevails in the land, and not errors.

Simon Singh has been supported by the charity Sense about Science, which has published this button in his favour.

The charity Sense about Science launched a lobbying campaign to draw attention to the case. They issued a statement and began an online petition entitled "The English law of libel has no place in scientific disputes about evidence", which was signed by about 20,000 people. Many press sources have covered the issue.

The publicity produced by the libel action led to a "furious backlash", with formal complaints of false advertising being made against more than 500 individual chiropractors within one 24-hour period, with the number later climbing to one-quarter of all British chiropractors. It also prompted the McTimoney Chiropractic Association to write in a leaked message to its members advising them to remove leaflets that make claims about whiplash and colic from their practice, to be wary of new patients and telephone inquiries, and telling their members: "If you have a website, take it down NOW" and "Finally, we strongly suggest you do NOT discuss this with others, especially patients." One chiropractor is quoted as saying that "Suing Simon was worse than any Streisand effect and chiropractors know it and can do nothing about it."

In response to demands that the British Chiropractic Association "engage in scientific debate over its position", the BCA released a statement supposedly presenting scientific evidence. According to The Guardian, the article was

ripped apart by bloggers within 24 hours of publication, before being subjected to a further shredding in the British Medical Journal. It emerged that 10 of the papers cited had nothing to do with chiropractic treatment, and several weren't even studies. The remainder consisted of a small collection of poor-quality trials. More seriously, the BCA misled the public with a misrepresentation of one paper, a Cochrane review looking at the effectiveness of various treatments for bed-wetting ...

In a new report, the General Chiropractic Council "has disowned the claims of the BCA—the same claims that lie at the centre of its libel action against Simon Singh. ... Notably, the report concludes that the evidence does not support claims that chiropractic treatment is effective for childhood colic, bed-wetting, ear infections or asthma, the very claims that Singh was sued for describing as 'bogus'."

== Legal impact ==
The Singh case and several other high-profile cases prompted three organizations (Sense about Science, Index on Censorship, and English PEN) – all concerned about free speech and scientific debate – to join forces to form the Libel Reform Campaign. On 25 April 2013, the Defamation Act 2013 received royal assent and became law. The purpose of the reformed law of defamation is to "ensure that a fair balance is struck between the right to freedom of expression and the protection of reputation". Under the new law, plaintiffs must show that they suffer serious harm before the court will accept the case. Additional protection for website operators, a defence of "responsible publication on a matter of public interest", and new statutory defences of truth and honest opinion are also part of the key areas covered by the new law.
