= William Harvey Lillard =

American chiropractic patient

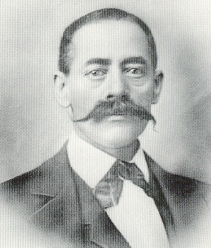
Harvey Lillard

William Harvey Lillard (1856 – September 7, 1925) was the first chiropractic patient.

== Biography ==
Harvey Lillard was an African-American janitor who worked in the Ryan Building in Brady Street, Davenport, Iowa. He was the first person to be treated with the technique known as chiropractic by D.D. Palmer.

Lillard maintained the corner building where Palmer had his office on the 4th floor. In September 1895 he told Palmer that he had lost most of his hearing and was almost completely deaf. Lillard added that he "could not hear the racket of a wagon on the street or the ticking of a watch." When asked how he had become deaf he replied that, 17 years before, while bent over in a cramped, stooping position he "heard something 'pop' in his spine" and immediately lost most of his hearing.

Palmer later told that he then offered to take a look at Lillard's spine and found a lump just between his shoulders; he persuaded Lillard to allow him to "rack his bone back into position." Palmer, in fact, thought Lillard's hearing loss was due to a misalignment that blocked the spinal nerves which control the inner ear, the so-called vertebral subluxation; he decided to push the vertebrae back into place and, after a few days, Lillard said that his hearing was better and almost completely restored. Lillard described:

I was deaf 17 years and I expected to always remain so, for I had doctored a great deal without any benefit. I had long ago made up my mind to not take any more ear treatments, for it did me no good. Last January Dr. Palmer told me that my deafness came from an injury in my spine. This was new to me; but it is a fact that my back was injured at the time I went deaf. Dr. Palmer treated me on the spine; in two treatments I could hear quite well. That was eight months ago. My hearing remains good.

— Harvey Lillard, 320 W. Eleventh St., Davenport, Iowa.

The date of Lillard's treatment is not confirmed. Some sources indicate September 6, while others indicate September 15 and 18 of September. Some sources also indicate that the month and year were changed by B. J. Palmer, the son of Daniel David Palmer. Others indicate different years, 1894–1896, and month, January–April, as well.

Lillard died on September 7, 1925, and was buried in Lakeview Cemetery, Seattle.
