= Joseph C. Keating Jr. =

American clinical psychologist (1950–2007)

Joseph C. Keating Jr. (1950–2007) was trained as a clinical psychologist who spent most of his life teaching and researching the chiropractic profession. He is best known for his published works as a historian of chiropractic.

== Early life ==
Keating was born and raised in the Hudson River Valley, in the northeast U.S.A. He was the oldest of five children born to Joseph C. Keating Sr. and Mary A. Welsh Keating. The family resided on Enloe Street in the Lake Peekskill area near the Putnam / Westchester County, New York border.

== Education and practice ==
Keating was trained in clinical psychology and clinical research methods at the State University of New York at Albany, where he was awarded a PhD in 1981. He performed a post-doctoral clinical residency at a physical medicine and rehabilitation specialty hospital in Schenectady. He also practiced with a urologist during 1984–86, specializing in the conservative care of lower urinary tract dysfunctions. He practiced as a clinical psychologist in California for 16 years.

In 1981 he began a career as a clinical researcher, faculty member, administrator and historian at several institutions, including the University of the Pacific (Department of Psychology, Behavioral Medicine Program), Palmer College of Chiropractic-West (Professor), Northwestern College of Chiropractic (where he served as Director of Research) and Western States Chiropractic College.

He was Professor at Los Angeles College of Chiropractic (1994–2000), where he taught Clinical Research Methods, History of Chiropractic and Philosophy & Reasoning.

From 1988, he was a member of the board of directors of the National Institute of Chiropractic Research (NICR) and served on the editorial board of several peer-reviewed, scholarly periodicals, including Clinical Chiropractic, the Chiropractic Journal of Australia, Journal of the Canadian Chiropractic Association and the Journal of Manipulative and Physiological Therapeutics.

Keating was a former president (1994–95) of the Association for the History of Chiropractic (AHC) and served on the board of directors. He was also a Homewood Professor of the Canadian Memorial Chiropractic College during 1999–2002. He authored several hundred professional papers and several books.

Keating was an early advocate of developing the research approach to replace the "chiropractic works" mentality that had dominated chiropractic's faculty and students well into the 20th century. By 1998, Keating was challenging the ethos of the chiropractic profession by addressing the associations and flooding the chiropractic literature via journals, magazines and newsletters outlining the steps necessary to develop a cadre of chiropractic practitioner-scientists. He was instrumental in developing the research departments of several chiropractic colleges.

== Works ==
- A History of Los Angeles College of Chiropractic;
- B.J. of Davenport: The early years of chiropractic. Davenport, IA: Association for the History of Chiropractic; 1997.
- A History of Chiropractic Education in North America (also published by AHC)
- Toward a philosophy of the science of chiropractic: A primer for clinicians. Stockton: Stockton Foundation for Chiropractic Research; 1992.
- We Take Care of Our Own: NCMIC & the Story of Malpractice Insurance in Chiropractic
