= Association for the History of Chiropractic =

Health education organization

The Association for the History of Chiropractic, founded in 1980, promotes the scholarly study and recording of the history of chiropractic. It publishes books and the journal Chiropractic History, holds an annual meeting, and gives an annual award. Membership is open to anyone with an interest.
