= Dynamic Chiropractic =

- Categories: Trade magazine, Chiropractic
- Frequency: Biweekly
- Circulation: 60,000 (2007)
- Publisher: MPA Media
- Founded: 1982
- Country: USA
- Based in: Huntington Beach, California
- Language: English
- Website: chiroweb.com
- ISSN: 1076-9684

Dynamic Chiropractic is a magazine for chiropractors that is indexed by CINAHL. The publisher is MPA Media. A Canadian version exists with modified content. The Canadian version has a readership of 6000, while the American version has a circulation of over 60,000.
