= British Chiropractic Association =

Professional association of chiropractors in the United Kingdom

- Abbreviation: BCA
- Predecessor: Chiropractors’ Association of the British Isles
- Formation: 1925
- Headquarters: 59 Castle Street; Reading; Berkshire
- Location: United Kingdom
- Coordinates: 51.4526°N 0.9767°W
- Members: (2016)
- President: Tim Button
- CEO: Cait Allen
- Website: chiropractic-uk.co.uk

The British Chiropractic Association (BCA) was founded in 1925 and represents over 50% of UK chiropractors. It is the largest and longest established association for chiropractors in the United Kingdom. The BCA have implemented campaigns regarding awareness of many modern technologies and the injuries that can result from them, such as RSI from smartphone and laptop use.

== History ==
Chiropractic first emerged in Britain in the years before World War I, but a formal association of chiropractors in the United Kingdom did not exist until 1922, when the Chiropractors’ Association of the British Isles held its first meeting in Belfast. This was a short-lived organisation but, in 1925, another association of chiropractors was formed; the British Chiropractors’ Association.

The association began with fewer than 20 members but, despite this, an insurance scheme was set in place for its membership. In the ensuing years, the BCA gradually developed to take the form that it does today. When the British Chiropractic Association announced the purchase of premises in Bournemouth for the establishment of a chiropractic college in 1964, the number of chiropractors practising in the UK was quite small. The opening of the Anglo-European College of Chiropractic, in 1965, led to a steady increase in the numbers of chiropractors in the UK and, in 2010, there were more than 1,300 practicing members and over 600 student members. Today, members have practices spanning the whole of the United Kingdom and BCA members are graduates of 20 different internationally accredited chiropractic educational institutions. The association only accepts into membership graduates of a Chiropractic degree course validated by a member of the Council of Chiropractic Education International (CCEI). Individual applicants must also ensure their course meets the requirements of the UK regulator, the General Chiropractic Council. The association provides a wide range of services for members and as an information source for the public. The association celebrated its 80th anniversary in 2005.

== European Chiropractors Union / World Federation of Chiropractic ==
The BCA was a founder member of the European Chiropractors' Union (ECU) in 1932. The first President of the ECU was Charles Bannister, a British Chiropractor.

Since then, the association has remained prominently active within the ECU and has been key to the establishment and development of chiropractic education and the chiropractic profession in Europe. When the World Federation of Chiropractic was formed in 1988, the British Chiropractic Association was a founder member and important contributor in the federation’s development.

== Libel case against Simon Singh ==
In July 2008, the BCA issued libel proceedings against Simon Singh, who has specialised in writing about mathematical and scientific topics, for writing in The Guardian newspaper and website that the association was promoting 'bogus treatments'. In his article, Singh questioned the BCA's claims that chiropractic treatment "can help treat children with colic, sleeping and feeding problems, frequent ear infections, asthma and prolonged crying". The BCA asked Singh to retract his allegations because they were "factually wrong, defamatory and damaging to the BCA’s reputation". After the BCA won a preliminary court ruling in May 2009, Singh announced in June 2009 that he intended to appeal against the ruling, and on 14 October 2009 Singh was granted leave to appeal. On 29 October 2009, Times Higher Education reported that Singh had won the right to appeal against the preliminary ruling on "meaning" in the case. Singh responded to the judgement that it was the "best possible result" but warned that he would try not to get his hopes up. "We have only won leave to appeal. Now we must convince the Court of Appeal on the issue of meaning. There is a long battle ahead." In April 2010, Singh won his court appeal for the right to rely on the defence of fair comment.

An editorial in Nature commented on the case, and stated that although the BCA has said that it believes in open discussions about the evidence base for chiropractic treatments and beliefs, it instead appears to many observers that the association is trying to use libel laws to suppress debate. Sense about Science has been a major supporter of Singh during this case and editorials in BMJ argued that the lawsuit highlights the chilling effects of English libel law on scientific discourse, and free speech.

The backlash to the BCA's libel case has resulted in a lot of coverage in both skeptical and mainstream media, and as such is considered by some to be an example of the Streisand effect.

The publicity produced by the BCA's libel action has led to formal complaints of false advertising being made against more than 500 individual chiropractors within one 24-hour period, when these cases were brought for consideration by the General Chiropractic Council, however, 92% were dismissed with "no case to answer".

On 1 April 2010, Singh won a crucial appeal that allowed him to clarify that what he wrote was an opinion and was thus protected by the defence of "fair comment" in British libel law. In response on 15 April 2010, the BCA officially withdrew its lawsuit, ending the case. The BCA issued a statement the same day outlining their reasons for withdrawing.
