= Vertebral subluxation =

Chiropractic concept

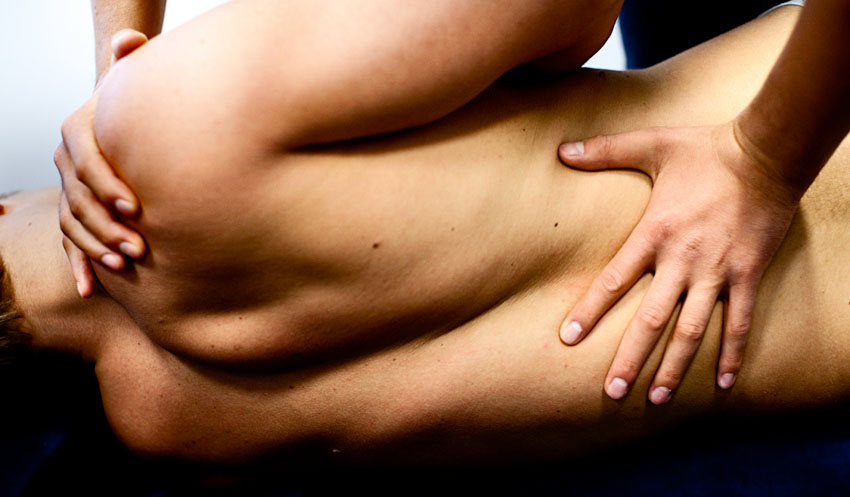
- A chiropractor performing a vertebral adjustment of the lumbar spine on a patient

Alternative therapy
- NCCIH Classification: Manipulative and body-based
- Legality: differs from country to country

In chiropractic, a vertebral subluxation means pressure on nerves, abnormal functions creating a lesion in some portion of the body, either in its action or makeup (defined by D.D. Palmer and B.J. Palmer, founders of chiropractic). Chiropractors claim subluxations are not necessarily visible on X-rays.

Straight chiropractors continue to follow Palmer's tradition, claiming that vertebral subluxation has considerable health effects and also adding a visceral component to the definition. Most medical experts and some mixer chiropractors consider these ideas to be pseudoscientific and dispute these claims, as there is no scientific evidence for the existence of chiropractic subluxations or proof they or their treatment have any effects on health.

The use of the word vertebral subluxation should not be confused with the term's precise usage in medicine, which considers only the anatomical relationships.

According to the World Health Organization (WHO), a chiropractic subluxation is a "dysfunction in a joint or motion segment in which alignment, movement integrity, and/or physiological function are altered, although contact between joint surfaces remains intact". The WHO notes that this is "different from the current medical definition" of a subluxation, which is a "structural displacement" significant enough to be "visible on static imaging studies" such as X-rays. Chiropractic is a field of alternative treatment outside scientific mainstream medicine, whose practitioners (chiropractors) are not medical doctors.

== History ==
In 1910, D.D. Palmer, the founder of chiropractic, wrote:

Nerves carry impulses outward and sensations inward. The activity of these nerves, or rather their fibers, may become excited or allayed by impingement, the result being a modification of functionating—too much or not enough action—which is dis-ease.

In 1909, D.D. Palmer's son, B.J. Palmer, incorrectly claimed that chiropractic subluxation caused contagious diseases, writing:

Chiropractors have found in every disease that is supposed to be contagious, a cause in the spine. In the spinal column we will find a subluxation that corresponds to every type of disease. If we had one hundred cases of small-pox, I can prove to you where, in one, you will find a subluxation and you will find the same conditions in the other ninety-nine. I adjust one and return his functions to normal... . There is no contagious disease... . There is no infection... . There is a cause internal to man that makes of his body in a certain spot, more or less a breeding ground [for microbes]. It is a place where they can multiply, propagate, and then because they become so many they are classed as a cause.

== Clinical practice ==
=== Definitions ===
Chiropractors use and have used various terms to express this concept: subluxation, vertebral subluxation (VS), vertebral subluxation complex (VSC), "killer subluxations", and the "silent killer".

Chiropractors along with some physical therapists and osteopathic physicians, have also used another term, BOOP, meaning "bone out of place".

The WHO definition of the chiropractic vertebral subluxation is:

A lesion or dysfunction in a joint or motion segment in which alignment, movement integrity and/or physiological function are altered, although contact between joint surfaces remains intact. It is essentially a functional entity, which may influence biomechanical and neural integrity.

The purported displacement is not necessarily visible on static imaging studies, such as X-rays. This is in contrast to the medical definition of spinal subluxation which, according to the WHO, is a "significant structural displacement", and therefore visible on X-rays.

As of 2014, the National Board of Chiropractic Examiners states:

The specific focus of chiropractic practice is known as the chiropractic subluxation or joint dysfunction. A subluxation is a health concern that manifests in the skeletal joints, and, through complex anatomical and physiological relationships, affects the nervous system and may lead to reduced function, disability or illness.

In 1996 an official consensus definition of subluxation was formed. Cooperstein and Gleberzon have described the situation: "... although many in the chiropractic profession reject the concept of "subluxation" and shun the use of this term as a diagnosis, the presidents of at least a dozen chiropractic colleges of the Association of Chiropractic Colleges (ACC) developed a consensus definition of "subluxation" in 1996. It reads:

Chiropractic is concerned with the preservation and restoration of health, and focuses particular attention on the subluxation. A subluxation is a complex of functional and/or structural and/or pathological articular changes that compromise neural integrity and may influence organ system function and general health. A subluxation is evaluated, diagnosed, and managed through the use of chiropractic procedures based on the best available rational and empirical evidence.

In 2001 the World Federation of Chiropractic, representing the national chiropractic associations in 77 countries, adopted this consensus statement which reaffirms belief in the vertebral subluxation.

The ACC paradigm has been criticized by chiropractic authors:

All in all, the ambiguities that permeate the ACC's statements on subluxation render it inadequate as a guide to clinical research... Whether the ACC's subluxation claims have succeeded as a political statement is beyond our concern here. These assertions were published as a priori truths (what many chiropractors have traditionally referred to as "principle"), and are exemplary of scientifically unjustified assertions made in many corners of the profession. It matters not whether unsubstantiated assertions are offered for clinical, political, scientific, educational, marketing or other purposes; when offered without acknowledgment of their tentative character, they amount to dogmatism. We contend that attempts to foster unity (among the schools or in the wider profession) at the expense of scientific integrity is ultimately self-defeating. To be sure, the profession's lack of cultural authority is based in part upon our characteristic disunity. However, attempts to generate unity by adoption of a common dogma can only bring scorn and continued alienation from the wider health care community and the public we all serve.

In May 2010 the General Chiropractic Council, the statutory regulatory body for chiropractors in the United Kingdom, issued guidance for chiropractors stating that the chiropractic vertebral subluxation complex "is an historical concept" and "is not supported by any clinical research evidence that would allow claims to be made that it is the cause of disease or health concerns."

The chiropractic vertebral subluxation complex has been a source of controversy since its inception in 1895 due to the lack of empirical evidence for its existence, its metaphysical origins, and claims of its far reaching effects on health and disease. Although some chiropractic associations and colleges support the concept of subluxation, many in the chiropractic profession reject it and shun the use of this term as a diagnosis. In the United States and in Canada the term nonallopathic lesion may be used in place of subluxation. Other chiropractors consider subluxation as more of an abstract concept rather than a medical condition. Tedd Koren says,

The vertebral subluxation cannot be precisely defined because it is an abstraction, an intellectual construct used by chiropractors, chiropractic researchers, educators and others to explain the success of the chiropractic adjustment.

This is not a unique state of affairs, abstract entities populate many branches of science...

Subluxations, genes, gravity, the ego and life are all heuristic devices, "useful fictions" that are used to explain phenomenon that are far larger than our understanding. We use them as long as they work for us and discard or limit their application when they become unwieldy or unable to account for new observations...

Critics of chiropractic have incorrectly assumed that chiropractic is based on the theory or principle that vertebral subluxations cause "pinched" nerves that cause disease. They have it backwards. Chiropractic is based on the success of the spinal adjustment. The theory attempting to explain the success of the adjustment (nerve impingement, disease, subluxations) followed its clinical discovery.

Examples of such erroneous criticisms based on this straw man argument abound in the medical literature. Some examples: "The teachers, research workers and practitioners of medicine reject the so-called principle on which chiropractic is based and correctly and bluntly label it a fraud and hoax on the human race." "The basis of chiropractic is completely unscientific." The theory on which chiropractic is based [is false], namely that a "subluxation" of a spinal vertebra presses on a nerve interfering with the passage of energy down that nerve causing disease to organs supplied by that nerve, and that chiropractic "adjustments" can alleviate the pressure thereby treating or preventing such disease. There is no scientific evidence for the validity of this theory."

To be fair, statements by some chiropractors have tended to perpetuate this misunderstanding: "Pressure on nerves causes irritation and tension with deranged functions as a result."

When chiropractors declare that "pinched nerves" "nerve impingement" "spinal fixations" or others mechanisms of action explain how subluxations affect the person and how chiropractic works they are making the same mistake medical critics make – assuming chiropractic is based on theory. Mechanisms and theories are useful tools, but their limitations should always be kept in mind.

=== International Classification of Diseases coding ===
The differences between a medical subluxation and a chiropractic "vertebral subluxation" create confusion and difficulties when it comes to following official ICD-9 and ICD-10 coding. In a 2014 article in Dynamic Chiropractic by a chiropractor who is a certified professional coder, these difficulties were discussed in detail. He noted that the WHO recognizes the differences between the two types of "subluxations", and also pointed out certain difficulties for chiropractors:

...the official definition of 739 codes is "nonallopathic lesions, not elsewhere classified.... In other words, 739 is a code that does not describe a subluxation. It does not even say what the patient has; it says that there is no code to describe what the patient has.... [T]he elusive "vertebral subluxation complex" I learned about in school has no place in the ICD-9 code set. All we get is 739, which is a code for conditions that do not have a code. ICD-9 has never provided a code that truly describes this and differentiates between the chiropractic subluxation and the allopathic subluxation. Chiropractors have been compelled to try to fit a square peg into a round hole for many years.

At the time of writing (August 2014) it was still uncertain which codes in the newer ICD-10 would be useful for chiropractors and how they would be interpreted.

=== Components ===
Traditionally there have been five components that form the chiropractic subluxation.

1. Spinal Kinesiopathology
2. Neuropathophysiology/Neuropathology
3. Myopathology
4. Histopathology
5. Biochemical changes

=== Diagnosis ===
Historically, the detection of spinal misalignment (subluxations) by the chiropractic profession has relied on X-ray findings and physical examination. At least two of the following four physical signs and/or symptoms must be documented to qualify for reimbursement:

- Pain and tenderness
- Asymmetry/misalignment
- Range of motion abnormality
- Tissue/tone changes

=== Rationale ===
It has been proposed that a vertebral subluxation can negatively affect general health by altering the neurological communication between the brain, spinal cord and peripheral nervous system. Although individuals may not always be symptomatic, straight chiropractors believe that the presence of vertebral subluxation is in itself justification for correction via spinal adjustment.

V. Strang, D.C., describes several hypotheses on how a misaligned vertebra may cause interference to the nervous system in his book, Essential Principles of Chiropractic:

- Nerve compression hypothesis: suggests that when the vertebrae are out of alignment, the nerve roots and/or spinal cord can become pinched or irritated. While the most commonly referenced hypothesis, and easiest for a patient to understand, it may be the least likely to occur.
- Proprioceptive insult hypothesis: focuses on articular alterations causing hyperactivity of the sensory nerve fibers.
- Somatosympathetic reflex hypothesis: all the visceral organ functions can be reflexly affected by cutaneous or muscular stimulation.
- Somatosomatic reflex hypothesis: afferent impulses from one part of the body can result in reflex activity in other parts of the body.
- Viscerosomatic reflex hypothesis: visceral afferent fibers cause reflex somatic problems.
- Somatopsychic hypothesis: the effects of a subluxation on the ascending paths of the reticular activating system.
- Neurodystrophic hypothesis: focuses on lowered tissue resistance that results from abnormal innervation.
- Dentate ligament-cord distortion hypothesis: upper cervical misalignment can cause the dentate ligaments to put a stress on the spinal cord.
- Psychogenic hypothesis: emotions, such as stress, causing contraction in skeletal muscles.

The vertebral subluxation has been described as a syndrome with signs and symptoms which include: altered alignment; aberrant motion; palpable soft tissue changes; localized/referred pain; muscle contraction or imbalance; altered physiological function; reversible with adjustment/manipulation; focal tenderness.

=== Procedure ===
Chiropractic treatment of vertebral subluxation focuses on delivering a chiropractic adjustment which is a high velocity low amplitude (HVLA) thrust to the dysfunctional spinal segments to help correct the chiropractic subluxation complex. Spinal adjustment is the primary procedure used by chiropractors in the adjustment.

=== Disagreement amongst practitioners ===
The chiropractic subluxation is the heart of the split between "straight" and "mixer" chiropractors. Straight chiropractors continue to follow Palmer's vitalistic tradition, claiming that subluxation has considerable health effects and also adding a visceral component to the definition, while mixers, as exemplified by the United Kingdom's General Chiropractic Council, consider it a historical concept with no evidence identifying it as the cause of disease.

Some chiropractors have described the disagreements within the profession about the concept, and have written skeptically about BOOP as an antiquated idea. In 1992 one wrote:

The main problem we often run into is the bone out of place (BOOP) concept. It seems we somehow step on toes when we describe the spine as a functioning entity instead of a stack of bones that can be shifted back and forth into the ideal configuration. The BOOP concept will eventually fade, and we are grateful for its contribution to chiropractic. For many decades, it offered a model to work from. This model has been updated by the rest of the healing profession, but chiropractors have been hesitant to let this antiquated model go. Some within our profession hold onto this model with a religious fervor. The chiropractic profession has moved into a new age. The BOOP concept has been updated and science is ever upon us in the 90s. Let's start asking questions again and drive the chiropractic profession kicking and screaming into the 21st century.

Chiropractor David Seaman wrote in 1994 about the "brutal civil war":

According to various gossip columnists in chiropractic, our profession appears to be currently enmeshed in a brutal civil war between BOOP (bone-out-of-place) practitioners and low back pain practitioners. It should be known that the BOOPers incorrectly call themselves subluxation-based practitioners. My experience has demonstrated that the BOOPers do not know enough about subluxation to call themselves subluxation-based chiropractors. We would all do well to not be subluxation-based in the BOOP sense. It should also be known that this so-called war is really an over-dramatized skirmish between vocal BOOPers and a theoretical group of anti-chiropractic DCs. I have yet to meet any of these anti-chiropractic DCs. Unfortunately, the BOOPers seem to think that those who do not embrace the totality of BOOP philosophy are merely non-BOOPers who are still very pro-chiropractic and appreciate the philosophy of chiropractic from a contemporary and nondogmatic perspective.

In an article written in 2004, Seaman openly disparaged the idea still propounded by "modern-day advocates of this concept":

... it is essentially impossible to have nerve interference. To summarize, nerve interference is described, by modern-day advocates of this concept, as a reduction of neural or mental impulses, which occurs in response to a bone-out-of-place (BOOP) subluxation... Clearly, the BOOP subluxation model fails miserably when considered in the light of basic neuroscience facts... BOOP subluxationists become angry and defensive when the BOOP model of subluxation is criticized... The reactionary nature of certain BOOP subluxationists is to accuse those who don't buy into the BOOP model of being anti-chiropractic—an astonishing leap of ignorance, to say the least. Furthermore, anyone who does not buy into the model is trying to "medicalize chiropractic"—another example of low-IQ thinking. And if tears do not well up in your eyes when you hear the phrase, "The power that made the body, heals the body," you are accused of having no passion for chiropractic—still another example of depressed, frontal-lobe activity. Even worse, if you don't buy into every bizarre, New Age, tree-hugging notion that comes down the pike and is circularly attached to subluxation, you will be accused of being an atheist—an excellent example of the need for psychiatrists and the drugs they prescribe.

== Evidence of condition ==
Believers within the chiropractic tradition assert that spinal health and function are directly related to general health and well-being, including visceral disorders, but the efficacy and validity of spinal manipulation to address visceral disorders systems remains a source of controversy within the chiropractic profession. The usefulness of spinal manipulation for organic disorders is not supported by evidence. Chiropractic professors and researchers, Nansel and Szlazak, found that:

the proper differential diagnosis of somatic (musculoskeletal) vs. visceral (organ) dysfunction represents a challenge for both the medical and chiropractic physician. The afferent convergence mechanisms, which can create signs and symptoms that are virtually indistinguishable with respect to their somatic vs. visceral etiologies, suggest it is not unreasonable that this somatic visceral-disease mimicry could very well account for the "cures" of presumed organ disease that have been observed over the years in response to various somatic therapies (e.g., spinal manipulation, acupuncture, Rolfing, Qi Gong, etc.) and may represent a common phenomenon that has led to "holistic" health care claims on the part of such clinical disciplines.

Considering this phenomenon, Seaman suggests that the chiropractic concept of joint complex (somatic) dysfunction should be incorporated into the differential diagnosis of pain and visceral symptoms because these dysfunctions often generate symptoms similar to those produced by true visceral disease and says that this mimicry leads to unnecessary surgical procedures and medications.

Other chiropractic researchers have also questioned some of the claimed effects of vertebral subluxation:

The literature supports the existence of somatovisceral and viscerosomatic reflexes, but there is little or no evidence to support the notion that the spinal derangements (often referred to as subluxations by chiropractors) can cause prolonged aberrant discharge of these reflexes. Equally unsupported in the literature is the notion that the prolonged activation of these reflexes will manifest into pathological state of tissues, and most relevantly, that the application of spinal manipulative therapy can alter the prolonged reflex discharge or be associated with a reversal of the pathological degeneration of the affected reflexes or tissues. The evidence that has been amassed is largely anecdotal or case report based and it has attracted much intra disciplinary debate because of its frequent association with certain approaches to management (largely described as being traditional or "philosophical" in nature).

Still other chiropractic researchers stated quite directly:

... early chiropractic philosophy ... considered disease the result of spinal nerve dysfunction caused by misplaced (subluxated) vertebrae. Although rejected by medical science, this concept is still [2000] accepted by a minority of chiropractors. ... Indeed, many progressive chiropractors have rejected the historical concept of the chiropractic subluxation in favor of ones that more accurately describe the nature of the complex joint disfunctions they treat.

Professor Philip S. Bolton of the School of Biomedical Sciences at University of Newcastle, Australia writes in Journal of Manipulative and Physiological Therapeutics, "The traditional chiropractic vertebral subluxation hypothesis proposes that vertebral misalignment cause illness, disease, or both. This hypothesis remains controversial." His objective was, "To briefly review and update experimental evidence concerning reflex effects of vertebral subluxations, particularly concerning peripheral nervous system responses to vertebral subluxations. Data source: Information was obtained from chiropractic or, scientific peer-reviewed literature concerning human or animal studies of neural responses to vertebral subluxation, vertebral displacement or movement, or both." He concluded, "Animal models suggest that vertebral displacements and putative vertebral subluxations may modulate activity in group I to IV afferent nerves. However, it is not clear whether these afferent nerves are modulated during normal day-to-day activities of living and, if so, what segmental or whole-body reflex effects they may have."

Edzard Ernst has stated that the "core concepts of chiropractic, subluxation and spinal manipulation, are not based on sound science."

An area of debate among chiropractors is whether "vertebral subluxation" is a metaphysical concept (as posited in B. J. Palmer's philosophy of chiropractic) or a real phenomenon. In an article on vertebral subluxation, the chiropractic authors wrote:

Subluxation syndrome is a legitimate, potentially testable, theoretical construct for which there is little experimental evidence. Acceptable as hypothesis, the widespread assertion of the clinical meaningfulness of this notion brings ridicule from the scientific and health care communities and confusion within the chiropractic profession. We believe that an evidence-orientation among chiropractors requires that we distinguish between subluxation dogma vs. subluxation as the potential focus of clinical research. We lament efforts to generate unity within the profession through consensus statements concerning subluxation dogma, and believe that cultural authority will continue to elude us so long as we assert dogma as though it were validated clinical theory.

Other chiropractors have declared its unproven status as an area that needs reform:

Some may suggest that chiropractors should promote themselves as the experts in "correcting vertebral subluxation." However, the scientific literature has failed to demonstrate the very existence of the subluxation. Until and unless sound research published in credible journals demonstrates the existence and reliable identification of vertebral subluxation, and vertebral subluxation is found to be an important public health problem, society at large will not care about its correction. Thus, "subluxation correction" alone is not a viable option for chiropractic's future.

A Beth Israel Deaconess Medical Center article describes the mainstream understanding of vertebral subluxation theory:

Since its origin, chiropractic theory has based itself on "subluxations," or vertebrae that have shifted position in the spine. These subluxations are said to impede nerve outflow and cause disease in various organs. A chiropractic treatment is supposed to "put back in" these "popped out" vertebrae. For this reason, it is called an "adjustment."

However, no real evidence has ever been presented showing that a given chiropractic treatment alters the position of any vertebrae. In addition, there is no real evidence that impairment of nerve outflow is a major contributor to common illnesses, or that spinal manipulation changes nerve outflow in such a way as to affect organ function.

In 2009, four scholarly chiropractors concluded that epidemiologic evidence does not support chiropractic's most fundamental theory. Since its inception, the vast majority of chiropractors have postulated that "subluxations" (misalignments) are the cause or underlying cause of ill health and can be corrected with spinal "adjustments". After searching the scientific literature, the chiropractic authors concluded:

No supportive evidence is found for the chiropractic subluxation being associated with any disease process or of creating suboptimal health conditions requiring intervention. Regardless of popular appeal, this leaves the subluxation construct in the realm of unsupported speculation. This lack of supportive evidence suggests the subluxation construct has no valid clinical applicability.

In 2005, four leading chiropractic researchers leveled strong critiques of chiropractic dogma:

Lastly, the ACC claims that chiropractors use the 'best available rational and empirical evidence' to detect and correct subluxations. This strikes us as pseudoscience, since the ACC does not offer any evidence for the assertions they make, and since the sum of all the evidence that we are aware of does not permit a conclusion about the clinical meaningfulness of subluxation. To the best of our knowledge, the available literature does not point to any preferred method of subluxation detection and correction, nor to any clinically practical method of quantifying compromised "neural integrity," nor to any health benefit likely to result from subluxation correction.

In 2015, internationally accredited chiropractic colleges from Bournemouth University, University of South Wales, University of Southern Denmark, University of Zürich, Institut Franco-Européen de Chiropraxie, and University of Johannesburg made an open statement which included: "The teaching of the vertebral subluxation complex as a vitalistic construct that claims that it is the cause of disease is unsupported by evidence. Its inclusion in a modern chiropractic curriculum in anything other than an historic context is therefore inappropriate and unnecessary."
