= Journal of Manipulative and Physiological Therapeutics =

- Discipline: Health care sciences, chiropractic, alternative medicine
- Language: English
- Edited by: Claire Johnson

Publication details
- History: Since 1978
- Publisher: Mosby on behalf of the American Chiropractic Association (United States)
- Frequency: 9/year
- Open access: Hybrid
- Impact factor: 1.4 (2024)

Standard abbreviations
- ISO 4: J. Manip. Physiol. Ther.

Indexing
- ISSN: 0161-4754 (print); 1532-6586 (web)
- LCCN: 00213629
- OCLC no.: 796193778

Links
- Journal homepage; Online archive

The Journal of Manipulative and Physiological Therapeutics is a peer-reviewed medical journal of chiropractic, the alternative medicine practice based on pseudoscientific ideas.

== Abstracting and indexing ==
The journal is abstracted and indexed in:

- CINAHL
- Current Contents/Clinical Medicine
- EMBASE
- Index Medicus/MEDLINE/PubMed
- Science Citation Index Expanded
- Scopus

According to the Journal Citation Reports, the journal has a 2024 impact factor of 1.4.
