= Alternative veterinary medicine =

Use of alternative medicine in the treatment of animals

Alternative veterinary medicine is the use of alternative medicine in the treatment of animals. Types of alternative therapies used for veterinary treatments may include, but are not limited to, acupuncture, herbal medicine, homeopathy, ethnomedicine and chiropractic. The term includes many treatments that do not have enough evidence to support them being a standard method within many veterinary practices.

== Definition ==
The terms alternative veterinary medicine, complementary veterinary medicine, complementary alternative veterinary medicine, holistic veterinary medicine, and integrative veterinary medicine may be used as synonyms. The task force for complementary and alternative veterinary medicine for the American Veterinary Medical Association says that:

"There is only one veterinary medicine and only one standard by which it should be assessed. All treatments and modalities should be judged by the same criteria and held to the same standards. Descriptive terms such as holistic, conventional, traditional, alternative, integrative, or complementary do not enhance the quality of care provided and should not receive special consideration when judging the safety and efficacy of those treatments."

The American Veterinary Medical Association also refers to it as a “heterogeneous group of preventive, diagnostic, and therapeutic philosophies and practices”.

== Background ==
The American Veterinary Medical Association includes various modalities under this the title of alternative veterinary medicine. Some forms of alternative veterinary medicine include photon therapy (laser), veterinary manipulative therapy, phytotherapy, integrative nutrition, acupuncture, botanical medicine, chiropractic, homeopathy, massage therapy, and nutraceuticals. Oftentimes different modalities of alternative veterinary medicine will be used in conjunction with one another for the best results, such as integrative nutritional being used with physical rehabilitation.

Interest in alternative veterinary medicine amongst pet owners has increased in recent decades, although there is not yet a governing body to mandate what aspects of alternative medicine are taught in veterinary medicine schools. One barrier to the advancement of alternative veterinary medicine is simply the lack of research and evidence backing up many modalities of treatment. However, many veterinary practices are encouraging staff to be familiar with alternative veterinary medicine because if a primary veterinarian can't provide information, pet owners may turn towards unprofessional methods of healing or listen to advice from those who are unqualified.

A veterinarian interested in alternative treatments may be a member of the American Holistic Veterinary Medical Association (AHVMA). The modalities comprising alternative veterinary medicine vary in their evidence for effectiveness. While they may vary in effectiveness based on evidence, the AHVMA does say that holistic medicine is humane. Use of blood tests, X-rays, and similar objective diagnostic techniques are minimized. Nearly every form of medicine and therapy used in alternative medicine for humans is also used in holistic veterinary medicine.

== Treatments ==
=== Integrative Nutrition ===
Integrative nutrition combines both aspects of alternative veterinary medicine as well as traditional western veterinary medicine. As with other aspects of alternative veterinary medicine, it has become an increasingly popular topic within veterinary clinics amongst pet owners and their veterinarians. This approach typically analyzes the benefits and drawbacks to popular diets such as grain free, raw, vegetarian, vegan, or home-prepared diets. Integrative nutrition is more and more common within the agriculture industry as well because of the increased amount of production and growth that can come with altering the diet of cattle, chicken, hogs, or other livestock. There's even evidence to suggest that changing the diets of cattle can change the rates of metabolic and infectious disease rates.

Some information about diet is already known, such as cats suffering if denied meat because they do not have all the necessary amino acids to create proteins. However, dogs do not experience the same lack of essential proteins when they eat vegetarian diets. As with other aspects of alternative veterinary medicine, more research needs to be done to definitively say what diets are best, although it is likely that different diets are best for different pets, depending on species, activity level, pre-existing health conditions, and financial stability and time commitment of owners.

=== Physical Rehabilitation and Sports Medicine ===
Physical rehabilitation and sports medicine is typically treated as an umbrella term referring to underwater treadmill therapy, photobiomodulation or laser therapy, hyperbaric oxygen, therapeutic ultrasound, shockwave therapy, and personalized exercise plans. This form of alternative veterinary medicine has permeated traditional western veterinary medicine with great success, likely because of its similarity to treatments that humans receive. Many types of physical rehabilitation and sports medicine treatments have been studied in humans and in animals enough to have some sort of evidence to support its usage.

Underwater treadmill therapy has various reports of efficacy, but it can be used for both rehabilitation and conditioning. Photobiomodulation hasn't yet been proved to be a legitimate treatment plan but there are tentative connections to benefits. This therapy refers to when stimulation occurs via light and reportedly increases energy and antioxidant production. Hyperbaric oxygen therapy functions in a similar way to photobiomodulation therapy and lacks legitimacy as well.

Therapeutic ultrasound provides deep tissue thermal stimulation to increase range of motion and tendon strength and is often used to help heal deep injuries. Shockwave therapy uses acoustic sound waves to alter tissue mechanics and inflammation. Lastly, personalized exercise plans often are proven to be very effective, although some exercises have not been researched extensively. This treatment is used for pets who are recovering from injury, surgery, or for other reasons need to build strength or increase range of motion.

== See also ==
- Veterinary acupuncture
- Veterinary homeopathy
- Veterinary chiropractic
- Ethnoveterinary medicine
- Traditional Chinese veterinary medicine
- Underwater therapy
- Photobiomodulation
- Hyperbaric oxygen
- Shockwave therapy
- Physical rehabilitation
- Sports medicine
