= List of chiropractic schools =

This list of chiropractic schools is organized alphabetically by country. In those countries with functioning, specialized, accrediting agencies, the colleges holding "recognized", or "accredited" status are delineated. Other countries and regions are in the process of developing similar programs of accreditation; and, in Switzerland, chiropractic is so fully integrated into the health care system that the existence of a separate accrediting agency is thus obviated. The course is taught in university, on the same basis as human medicine.

In 2015, nine internationally accredited chiropractic colleges: AECC, WIOC, IFEC-Paris, IFEC-Toulouse, SDU-Odense, UZ-Zurich, UJ-Johannesburg, Durbin University of Technology and Macquarie University, Australia, made an open statement which included: "The teaching of the vertebral subluxation complex as a vitalistic construct that claims that it is the cause of disease is unsupported by evidence. Its inclusion in a modern chiropractic curriculum in anything other than an historic context is therefore inappropriate and unnecessary".

This document is based upon the World Federation of Chiropractic Educational Statement formulated in November 2014 at the Miami Education Conference.

== Schools ==
Country	Chiropractic institution	Location	Enrollment	Status	Accrediting agency
Australia	Macquarie University	Sydney, NSW Australia	40,208	Accredited	CCEA
Australia	Murdoch University	Perth, Western Australia	14,276	Accredited	CCEA
Australia	Royal Melbourne Institute of Technology (RMIT)	Melbourne, Australia	87,762	Accredited	CCEA
Australia	Central Queensland University (CQU)	Rockhampton, Australia		Accredited	CCEA
Brazil	Anhembi Morumbi University			Accredited	Ministry of Education, Brazil
Brazil	Feevale Central University			Accredited	Ministry of Education, Brazil
Canada	Canadian Memorial Chiropractic College	Toronto, Ontario		Accredited	FCC
Canada	Université du Québec à Trois-Rivières	Trois-Rivières, Quebec		Accredited	FCC
Chile	Universidad Central de Chile			Accredited	Ministry of Education, Chile
Denmark	University of Southern Denmark (Syddansk Universitet Odense)			Accredited	ECCE
France	Institut Franco-Européen de Chiropratique	Paris, France		Accredited	ECCE
Germany	Chiropraktik Akademie			Accredited/Not accredited	Accredited by German Accreditation Council, not accredited by ECCE
Germany	Hochschule Fresenius/Health Campus			Accredited	Accredited by German Accreditation Council, not yet accredited by ECCE (planned for 2028)
Japan	Tokyo College of Chiropractic	Tokyo, Japan		Accredited	CCEA
Japan	Royal Melbourne Institute of Technology, Japan	To end of April 2012		Accredited	CCEA
Malaysia	International Medical University			Accredited	CCEA, Malaysian Qualifications Agency (MQA)
Mexico	Universidad Estatal del Valle de Ecatepec			Accredited	Ministry of Education, Mexico
Mexico	Universidad Estatal del Valle de Toluca			Accredited	Ministry of Education, Mexico
Mexico	Universidad Veracruzana			Unknown	
New Zealand	New Zealand College of Chiropractic	Auckland, New Zealand		Accredited	CCEA
South Africa	Durban University of Technology	Durban, South Africa		Accredited	ECCE
South Africa	University of Johannesburg			Accredited	ECCE
South Korea	Hanseo University	Seosan, Chungcheongnam-do		Accredited	CCEA
Spain	Barcelona College of Chiropractic	Barcelona, Spain		Accredited	ECCE
Spain	Madrid College of Chiropractic			Accredited	ECCE
Sweden	Kiropraktorhögskolan (NIMM Nordic Institute of Manual Medicine)	Stockholm, Sweden		Accredited	Swedish government
Switzerland	Universität Zürich (University of Zurich)			Accredited	SUK, CSA
Turkey	Bahçeşehir University			Accredited	Turkish National Higher Education Council
United Kingdom	Anglo-European College of Chiropractic	Bournemouth, England		Accredited	ECCE
United Kingdom	McTimoney College of Chiropractic	Abingdon, England		Accredited	ECCE
United Kingdom	University of South Wales			Accredited	ECCE
United States	Cleveland University-Kansas City	Overland Park, Kansas	492	Accredited	CCE
United States	D'Youville University	Buffalo, New York	3,097	Accredited	CCE
United States	Keiser University	Fort Lauderdale, Florida	19,633	Accredited	CCE
United States	Life Chiropractic College West	Hayward, California	198	Accredited	CCE
United States	Life University	Marietta, Georgia	2,917	Accredited	CCE
United States	Logan University	Chesterfield, Missouri	1,389	Accredited	CCE
United States	National University of Health Sciences	Lombard, Illinois	387	Accredited	CCE
United States	Northeast College of Health Sciences	Seneca Falls, New York	893	Accredited	CCE
United States	Northwestern Health Sciences University	Bloomington, Minnesota	923	Accredited	CCE
United States	Palmer College of Chiropractic	Davenport, Iowa	1,176	Accredited	CCE
United States	Palmer College of Chiropractic	Port Orange, Florida		Accredited	CCE
United States	Parker University	Dallas, Texas	979	Accredited	CCE
United States	Sherman College of Chiropractic	Spartanburg, South Carolina	439	Accredited	CCE
United States	Southern California University of Health Sciences	Whitter, California	124	Accredited	CCE
United States	Texas Chiropractic College	Pasadena, Texas	323	Accredited	CCE
United States	Universidad Central del Caribe	Bayamon, Puerto Rico	494	Accredited	CCE
United States	University of Bridgeport	Bridgeport, Connecticut	3,536	Accredited	CCE
United States	University of Pittsburgh	Pittsburgh, Pennsylvania	1st class (fall 2025) 40 with plans to expand to 60/year	Accreditation pending	CCE
United States	University of Western States	Portland, Oregon	926	Accredited	CCE

== See also ==
- Chiropractic education
- Council on Chiropractic Education
- Councils on Chiropractic Education International
- World Federation of Chiropractic
