= ICCE =

ICCE may refer to:

- Councils on Chiropractic Education International
- Imperial College Computing Engine
- Intracapsular cataract extraction, an ophthalmic surgical procedure
