= Life Chiropractic College West =

Private chiropractic school in Hayward, California, United States

- Former name: Pacific States Chiropractic College
- Motto: Express your potential.
- Type: Private chiropractic school
- Established: 1976
- Founder: George E. Anderson
- President: Ron Oberstein
- Academic staff: 55
- Doctoral students: 609
- Location: Hayward, California, United States
- Colors: Green, light blue, and white
- Nickname: Gladiators
- Website: lifewest.edu

Life Chiropractic College West is a private chiropractic school with locations in Hayward, California, and Bellevue, Nebraska, US, known for its Doctor of Chiropractic degree program. Founded as Pacific States Chiropractic College in 1976 by George E. Anderson, the name was changed in 1981 to its current form after a merger with Life Chiropractic College (now Life University).

== History ==
Life West traces its roots back to 1976 when it was founded by chiropractor George E. Anderson as Pacific States Chiropractic College. During its first years the school was involved in multiple malfeasance cases resulting in the termination of two administrators. During the early 1980s the school was run by three interim presidents until a merger was agreed between George Anderson, George Wentland, and Sid E. Williams (founder of Life Chiropractic College) to merge Pacific States Chiropractic College with Life College. The result of this merger was the establishment of Life Chiropractic College West in 1981.

In 2024, Oregon Public Broadcasting reported on the high debt burden of students who pursued degrees in alternative medicine. For Life Chiropractic College West, the median loan was $206,392 and the median earnings were $40,310, resulting in a debt to earnings ratio of 512%. This was the tenth highest ratio in the US among graduate programs and the highest among chiropractic programs. Immediately following Life Chiropractic College West's in the debt-to-earnings ranking were the chiropractic programs at Cleveland University-Kansas City and Life University.

== Accreditation ==
The Doctor of Chiropractic Degree Program at Life West has been accredited since 1987 by the Commission on Accreditation of the Council on Chiropractic Education (CCE).

The program is also accredited by the California Board of Chiropractic Examiners.
