= Ilse Kohler-Rollefson =

German scientist

Ilse Köhler-Rollefson
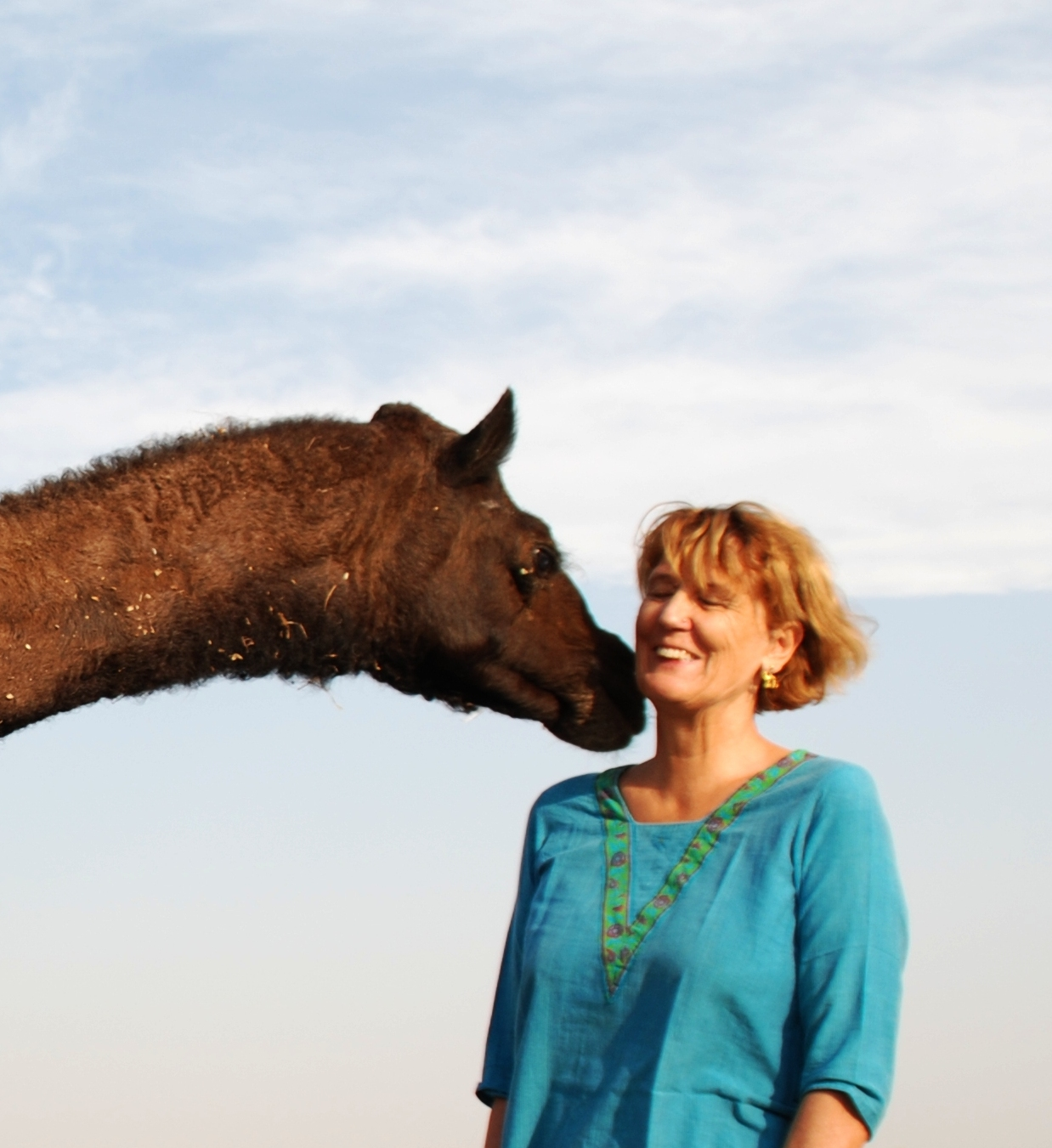
- Ilse Köhler-Rollefson with a camel
- Born: Ilse Köhler; Hamburg
- Education: University of Veterinary Medicine Hannover
- Occupation: Veterinarian
- Known for: Championing camels and pastoralism
- Spouse: Gary Rollefson
- Children: Aisha Rollefson, Jon Rollefson
- Scientific career
- Thesis: Zur Domestikation des Kamels, On the domestication of the camel (1981)
- Website: ilse-koehler-rollefson.com

Ilse Köhler-Rollefson is a German scientist based in India who is known for championing pastoralism, which she regards as a model for managing livestock within Planetary Boundaries. She has a special expertise on camels. She supports the Raika people whose way of life was under threat because of their dependence on camels and she decided to help. In 2017 she was awarded the highest award for women in India, the Nari Shakti Puraskar and, in 2018, the Federal Cross of Merit of the German Federal Government. She is the co-founder of the League for Pastoral Peoples, an international advocacy organization that is active at the UN level.

== Life ==
Köhler-Rollefson is the daughter of Dr. Diethard Köhler, a professor of botany and of Brigitte Köhler, an agricultural scientist. She grew up with horses and all kinds of other animals in Ober-Ramstadt Wembach in Germany. Out of love for animals she studied veterinary medicine at the Veterinary College in Hannover, graduating in 1971. After discouraging experiences in veterinary practice, she became an archaeozoologist working on excavations in Jordan, including the Neolithic site of Ain Ghazal. In Jordan she discovered her love for camels and lived with a Bedouin family to understand how nomadic life is reflected in the archaeological record. This helped her to understand how the process of domestication proceeded in prehistory. She completed her Ph.D. 'On the domestication of the camel' in 1981. She came to notice when she went to India on a fellowship of the American Institute of Indian Studies in 1990/91 to study camel socio-economics and management patterns. During her research, she engaged with the Raika people whose lives are traditionally built around camels. However because the Raika can no longer make a living from breeding camels, the camels are disappearing and the traditional camel culture is being lost.

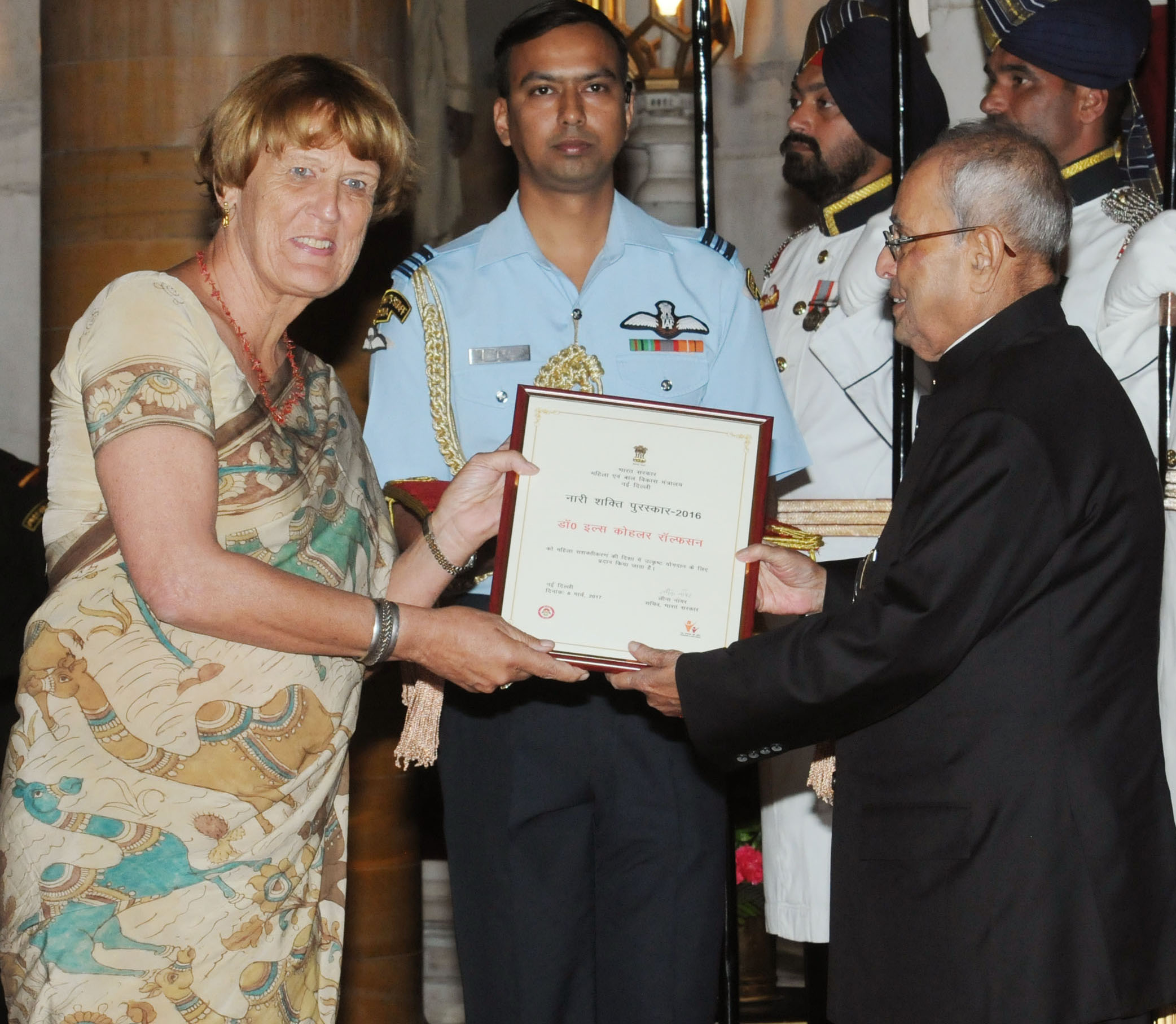
Receiving the Nari Shakti Puraskar

The Raika (aka Rabari) people are an ethnic group who believed that they were created in order to care for camels by Shiva. In 1992 she published "Raika Dromedary Breeders of Rajasthan: A Pastoral System in Crisis". They are pastoralists mainly in India.

She was trained as a veterinarian and an anthropologist and these come together in Ethnoveterinary medicine. She has found that traditional practices of veterinary medicine are legitimate and seeks to validate them. She has noted that at least since colonial times scientists had noted indigenous expertise in animal health and their diagnostic skills before implementing their Western-technology projects.

She noted and researched the role of the Raika and other pastoralists as creators of indigenous livestock breeds and guardians of domestic animal diversity ('Keepers of Genes') and was a moving force behind the concept of Livestock keepers' rights. Later she promoted Biocultural or Community Protocols for pastoralists as a tool for obtaining their rights under the UN Convention on Biological Diversity.

Together with Hanwant Singh Rathore, she created the NGO Lokhit Pashu-Palak Sansthan which lobbied the government of India for help. She is the co-founder and key worker with the League for Pastoral Peoples. To create income for the Raika, she set up the social enterprise Camel Charisma which markets camel milk and other camel products.

In 2002 she received an Associate Rolex Award for Enterprise. In 2017 President Pranab Mukherjee presented her with the highest award for women in India, the Nari Shakti Puruskar. The function took place at the Presidential palace, Rashtrapati Bhavan, in New Delhi.

In 2021 she argued that the pastoralists had to be valued as they turned "waste into worth". She rejects the word "wastelands" as colonial. These are rangelands that ensure that India's livestock has somewhere to thrive.

Learning from the Raika and other pastoralists she has developed a new framework for livestock development that aims to keep farm animals within planetary boundaries. This is elaborated in recent books ('Livestock for a Small Planet' and 'Hoofprints on the Land. How Traditional Herding and Grazing Can Restore the Soil and Bring Animal Agriculture Back in Balance with the Earth') and articles ('Learning from Pastoralists ').

In July 2025, she was a resident at the Rockefeller Foundation's Bellagio Center where she further developed the concept of managing livestock within Planetary Boundaries.

Together with colleagues, she promotes the concept of 'cruelty-free' livestock and is seeking to implement this through the social enterprise Camel Charisma.

== Works ==
- Köhler-Rollefson, Ilse (1992). "The Raika Dromedary Breeders of Rajasthan: A Pastoral System in Crisis". Nomadic Peoples. 30 (30): 74–83. JSTOR 43123358.
- Köhler-Rollefson, Ilse; Mundy, Paul; Mathias, Evelyn (2001). A Field Manual of Camel Diseases : traditional and modern health care for the dromedary. London: Intermediate Technology Publications. ISBN 978-1-85339-503-1. OCLC 42875459.
- Köhler-Rollefson, Ilse (2014). Camel Karma: Twenty Years Among India's Camel Nomads. Tranquebar Press. ISBN 978-93-84030-63-6. OCLC 899261519.
- Köhler-Rollefson, Ilse (2023). Hoofprints on the land : how traditional herding and grazing can restore the soil and bring animal agriculture back in balance with the earth. White River Junction. ISBN 978-1-64502-152-0. OCLC 1351685930.
