= AP Chemistry =

Advanced Placement course and exam

Logo of AP Chemistry as of 2025

Advanced Placement (AP) Chemistry (also known as AP Chem) is a course and examination offered by the College Board as a part of the Advanced Placement Program to give American and Canadian high school students the opportunity to demonstrate their abilities and earn college-level credits at certain colleges and universities. The AP Chemistry Exam has the lowest test participation rate out of all AP courses, with around half of AP Chemistry students taking the exam.

== Course ==
AP Chemistry is a course geared toward students with interests in chemical biologies, as well as any of the biological sciences. The course aims to prepare students to take the AP Chemistry exam toward the end of the academic year.

AP Chemistry covers most introductory general chemistry topics (excluding organic chemistry), including:

- Reactions
  - Chemical equilibrium
  - Chemical kinetics
  - Stoichiometry
  - Thermodynamics
  - Electrochemistry
  - Reaction types
- States of matter
  - Gases, Ideal gases and Kinetic theory
  - Liquids
  - Solids
  - Solutions
- Structure of matter
  - Atomic theory, including evidence for atomic theory
  - Chemical bonding, including intermolecular forces (IMF)
  - Nuclear chemistry (removed for May 2014 test)
  - Molecular geometry
  - Molecular models
  - Mass spectrometry
- Laboratory and chemical calculations
  - Thermochemistry
  - Chemical kinetics
  - Chemical equilibrium
  - Gas laws calculations

== Exam weighting ==
Exam Weighting
Unit	Exam Weighting (Multiple-Choice Section)
Unit 1: Atomic Structure and Properties	7%–9%
Unit 2: Compound Structure and Properties	7%–9%
Unit 3: Properties of Substances and Mixtures	18%–22%
Unit 4: Chemical Reactions	7%–9%
Unit 5: Kinetics	7%–9%
Unit 6: Thermochemistry	7%–9%
Unit 7: Equilibrium	7%–9%
Unit 8: Acids and Bases	11%–15%
Unit 9: Thermodynamics and Electrochemistry	7%–9%

== Exam ==
The annual AP Chemistry examination, which is typically administered in May, is divided into two major sections (multiple-choice questions and free response essays).

=== Old test (2013 and earlier) ===
The old test was composed of two sections: a multiple-choice section consisting of 75 questions with five answer choices each, and a free-response section consisting of six essay prompts that required the authoring of chemical equations, solution of problems, and development of thoughtful essays in response to hypothetical scenarios.

- Section I, the multiple-choice portion, did allow the use of a calculator in 2013 exams, with additional reference material, other than a periodic table. Each question contained five answer choices or four. 90 minutes were allotted for the completion of Section I. Section I covered the breadth of the curriculum.
- Section II, the free response section, was divided into two sections: Part A, requiring the completion of three problems, and Part B, also containing three problems. Part A, lasting 55 minutes, allowed the use of calculators, Part B, lasting 40 minutes, also allowed for calculators. The first problem in Part A concerned equilibrium related to solubility, acids and bases, or pressure/concentration. The first question of Part B was a chemical equation question in which 3 scenarios were presented and the student was required to work all 3 scenarios, authoring a balanced net ionic chemical equation for each scenario and answering questions about the equations and scenarios. If time permitted, students may have edited their responses from Part A during the time allotted for responding to Part B, though without the use of a calculator. The student needed to have completed all six questions.

While the use of calculators was prohibited during Section I and Section II Part B, a periodic table, a list of selected standard reduction potentials, and two pages of equations and conventions are available for use during the entirety of Section II.

=== New test (2014 and later) ===
The 2014 AP Chemistry exam was the first administration of a redesigned test as a result of a redesigning of the AP Chemistry course. The exam format is now different from the previous years, with 60 multiple choice questions (now with only four answer choices per question), 3 long free response questions, and 4 short free response questions. The new exam has a focus on longer, more in-depth, and lab-based questions. 10 topics were removed, and six were newly introduced. Six key course skills and Big Ideas are tested. The penalty for incorrect answers on the multiple choice section was also removed. More detailed information can be found at the related link.

=== Topics ===
- Structure and Matter, 20%
- States of Matter, 20%
- Reactions, 35–40%
- Descriptive Chemistry, 10–25%
- Laboratory, 5–10%

=== Grade distribution ===
The score distributions since 2007 were:

Score	2007	2008	2009	2010	2011	2012	2013	2014	2015	2016	2017	2018	2019	2020	2021	2022	2023	2024	2025	2026
5	15.3%	18.4%	18.0%	17.1%	17.0%	16.4%	18.9%	10.1%	9.2%	10.5%	10.1%	13.4%	11.5%	10.6%	11.2%	12.5%	16.0%	17.9%	17.9%	15%
4	18.0%	17.5%	17.9%	18.5%	18.4%	19.3%	21.5%	16.6%	16.1%	15.6%	16.2%	17.6%	16.6%	18.6%	16.4%	17.0%	27.1%	27.4%	28.6%	31%
3	23.0%	20.0%	20.2%	19.3%	19.5%	20.1%	18.8%	25.7%	28.1%	27.5%	26.1%	24.9%	27.5%	26.9%	23.7%	24.5%	32.0%	30.3%	31.4%	30%
2	18.5%	14.3%	14.2%	12.7%	14.6%	15.0%	14.9%	25.8%	24.9%	24.8%	26.2%	23.5%	23.0%	24.0%	24.7%	23.6%	16.9%	16.9%	15.9%	18%
1	25.3%	29.9%	29.8%	32.3%	30.4%	29.2%	26.0%	21.8%	21.7%	21.6%	21.4%	20.6%	21.4%	19.9%	23.9%	22.5%	8.0%	7.5%	6.2%	6%
% of Scores 3 or Higher	56.3%	55.9%	56.1%	54.9%	54.9%	55.8%	59.2%	52.4%	53.4%	53.6%	52.4%	55.9%	55.6%	56.1%	51.3%	54.0%	75.1%	75.6%	77.9%	76%
Mean	2.80	2.81	2.80	2.75	2.77	2.79	2.93	2.67	2.66	2.69	2.67	2.80	2.74	2.76	2.66	2.73	3.26	3.31	3.36	
Standard Deviation	1.40	1.49	1.48	1.49	1.47	1.46	1.47	1.26	1.24	1.26	1.26	1.31	1.28	1.26	1.30	1.32	1.15	1.17	1.13	
Number of Students	97,136	100,586	104,789	115,077	122,651	132,425	140,006	148,554	152,745	153,465	158,931	161,852	158,847	145,540	135,997	124,780	139,448	151,121	170,283	185,000

== Prerequisites ==
The College Board recommends successful completion of high school chemistry and Algebra 2; however, requirement of this may differ from school to school. AP Chemistry usually requires knowledge of Algebra 2; however, some schools allow students to take the course concurrently with this class. The requirement of regular or honors level high school chemistry may also be waived, but usually requires completion of a special assignment or exam, or completion of high school chemistry alongside AP Chemistry.

== See also ==
- Chemistry
- Glossary of chemistry terms
