= Chiropractic education =

Training in chiropractic

Chiropractic education trains students in chiropractic. Accredited Doctor of Chiropractic programs include instruction in several academic areas including neurology, radiology, microbiology, psychology, ethics, biology, gross anatomy, biochemistry, spinal anatomy and more. Prospective students are also usually trained in clinical nutrition, public health, pediatrics and other health or wellness related areas.

The entry criteria, structure, teaching methodology and nature of chiropractic programs offered at chiropractic schools vary considerably around the world, although in the United States programs are required to teach specific areas for accreditation purposes.

A 2005 World Health Organization (WHO) guideline states regardless of the model of education utilized, prospective chiropractors without relevant prior health care education or experience must spend no less than 4200 student/teacher contact hours (or the equivalent) in four years of full-time education. This includes a minimum of 1000 hours of supervised clinical training. Students must pass boards administered by the National Board of Chiropractic Examiners (NBCE) to be licensed to practice in a U.S. state or territory. The boards consists of parts I, II, III, and IV, as well as other additional tests required by state or if desired by students such as the physiotherapy exam.

== History ==
In 1908, chiropractic education originally began with a few months of training for chiropractic spinal manipulation. Over the next several years it grew to 18 months of training. In the 1920s the education expanded again to include subjects such as anatomy, physiology and histology. It was not until the 1950s that chiropractic schools began requiring college coursework as a prerequisite for admission. While chiropractic education continued to expand its educational requirements, the education still varied between institutions due to there being no single regulatory agency overseeing chiropractic education. This changed in 1974, with the Council for Chiropractic Educate (CCE) being appointed as the official chiropractic accrediting agency.

As chiropractic grew, there were two distinct groups that emerged in the profession; Straights and Mixers. The Straights emphasized a vitalistic philosophy and used spinal manipulation as their sole method of treatment. They had the belief that all disease originated from the spine. Mixers utilized spinal manipulation, but in conjunction with other therapies such as physical therapy, nutrition, electrical muscle stimulation, and more. Mixer chiropractic schools offered more medical training, which initially resulted in significant controversy. In 1997, American chiropractic schools tended to have lower entry requirements than medical or dental schools. A 2005 report stated "Early chiropractic education included classes in some basic and clinical sciences along with philosophy of chiropractic."

== Training ==
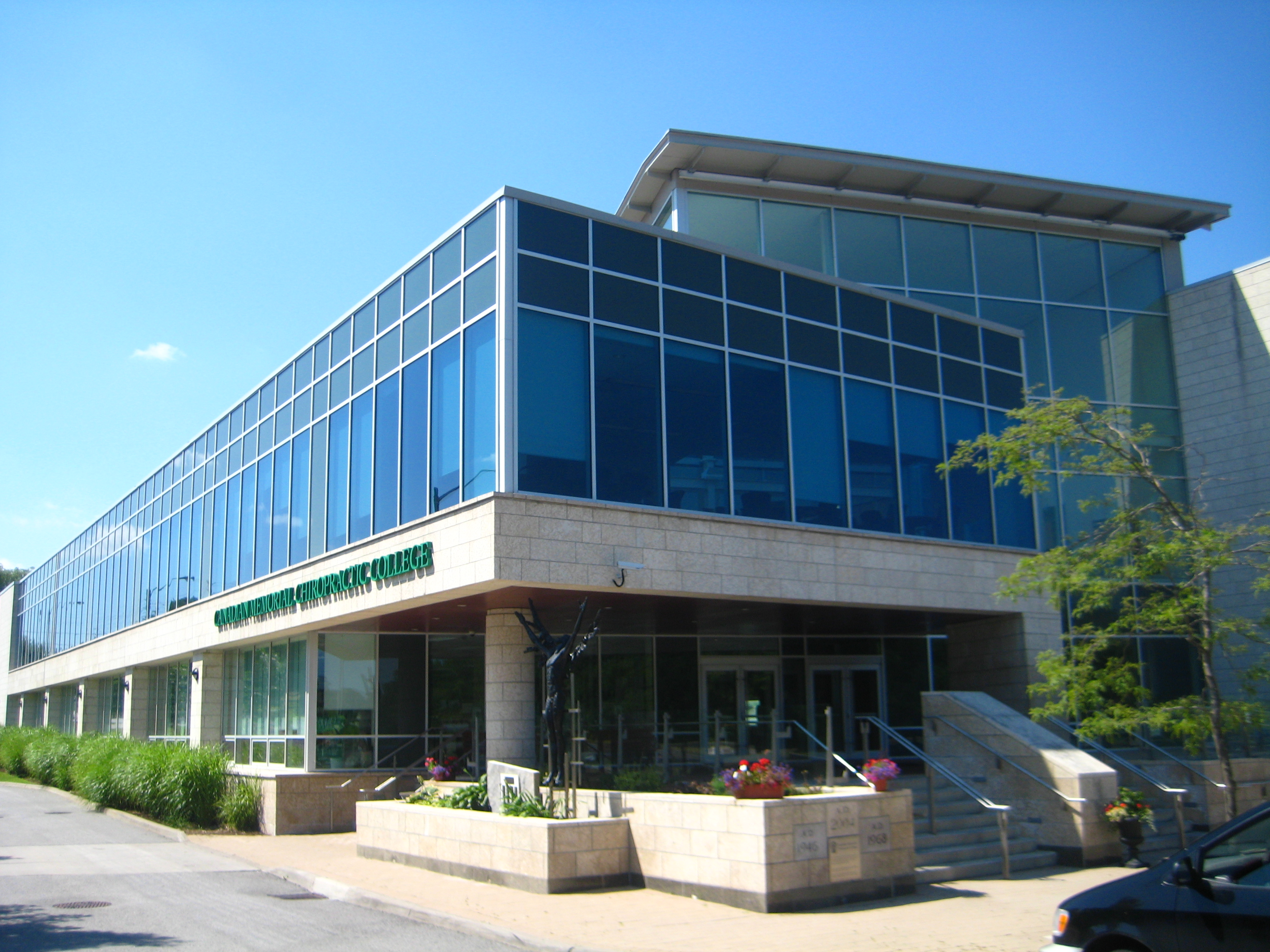
Founded in 1945, the Canadian Memorial Chiropractic College, in Toronto, Ontario, Canada.

Chiropractic education consists of college- or university-based training and education in the field of chiropractic as well as various certificates, certifications, licenses and diplomas. Regardless of the model of education utilized, prospective chiropractors without prior health care education or experience must spend no less than 4200 student/teacher contact hours (or the equivalent) in four years of full-time education. This calculates out to 21 hours per week, using a standard 50-week year. This includes a minimum of 1000 hours of supervised clinical training. The gross anatomy curricula of most chiropractic programs require students to spend time performing human cadaver dissection. Upon meeting all clinical and didactic requirements of chiropractic school, a degree in chiropractic is granted. However, in order to legally practice, chiropractors, like all self regulated health care professionals, must be licensed. Licensure is granted following successful completion of all state/provincial and national board exams so long as the chiropractor maintains malpractice insurance. Nonetheless, there are still some variations in educational standards internationally, depending on admission and graduation requirements. Chiropractic is regulated in North America by state/provincial statute, and also—to some extent—by the Business and Professions Code (e.g., in the state of California)—and the Case Law. Further, it has been argued that, at least in some states (in the USA), that this license subsumed the previous "drugless practitioner" license, and includes—within its scope of practice—that of the previous discipline.

In some countries, like the United States, chiropractors earn a professional doctorate where training is entered after obtaining between 90 and 120 credit hours of university level work (see second entry degree) and in most cases after obtaining a bachelor's degree. The World Health Organization lists three potential educational paths involving full-time chiropractic education around the globe. This includes: one to four years of pre-requisite training in basic sciences at university level followed by a four-year full-time doctorate program; DC. A five-year integrated bachelor degree; BSc (Chiro). A two-to-three-year master's degree following the completion of a bachelor's degree leads to the MSc (Chiro). In South Africa the Masters of Technology in Chiropractic (M.Tech. Chiro) is granted following six years of university.

Doctors of Chiropractic who wish to practice in New Mexico can prescribe certain medications. These doctors are required to obtain additional license and credentials from the New Mexico Board of Pharmacy and apply for a "Chiropractic Advanced Practice" Certification from the New Mexico Department of Regulations and Licensing

== International degrees in chiropractic ==
Various degree designations for the chiropractic field exist in different countries. They generally follow the Bachelor's, Master's, Doctorate scheme.

| Degree | Full Name | Country in which it is awarded |
| D.C. and M.S. (Chiro) | Doctor of Chiropractic & Master of Science (Chiropractic) | South Korea |
| B.App.Sc. (clin). & B.C.Sc. | Bachelor of Applied Science (Clinical Science) & Bachelor of Chiropractic Science | |
| B.Sc. (chiro) & B.C. | Bachelor of Science (Chiropractic) & Bachelor of Chiropractic | Australia |
| B.App.Sc. (Compl) & M.Clin.Chiro. | Bachelor of Applied Science (Complementary Medicine) & Master of Clinical Chiropractic | Australia |
| B.Chiro. | Bachelor of Chiropractic | New Zealand |
| B.Chiro. & M.Chiro | Bachelor of Chiropractic & Master of Chiropractic | Australia |
| B.Sc. (Hons) Chiro | Bachelor of Science (Hons) Chiropractic | Malaysia |
| B.Tech. (chiro) and M.Tech. (chiro) | Bachelor in Technology (Chiropractic) & Master in Technology (Chiropractic) | South Africa |
| D.C. | Doctor of Chiropractic | Brazil, Canada, France, Mexico, Spain, Sweden, United States |
| M.C. or M.Chiro. | Master of Chiropractic | Australia, Switzerland, UK |
| M.C.B. | Master in Clinical Biomechanics | Denmark |
| M.Sc.(Chiro) or M.Chiro | Master of Science (Chiropractic) | Turkey |

== Licensure and regulation ==
Regulations for chiropractic practice vary considerably from country to country. In some countries, such as the United States of America, Canada and some European countries, chiropractic has been legally recognized. In these countries, the profession is regulated and the prescribed educational qualifications are generally consistent, satisfying the requirements of the respective accrediting agencies. However, many countries have not yet developed chiropractic education or established laws to regulate the qualified practice of chiropractic. In addition, in some countries, other qualified health professionals and lay practitioners may use techniques of spinal manipulation and claim to provide chiropractic services, although they may not have received chiropractic training in an accredited program.

Chiropractic is governed internationally by the Councils on Chiropractic Education International (CCEI). This body is recognized by the World Federation of Chiropractic and the World Health Organization as the accrediting agency for schools of chiropractic around the world.

The minimum prerequisite for enrollment in a chiropractic college set forth by the CCE is 90 semester hours. Common prerequisite classes include those of the biological, chemical, & physical sciences, including: human anatomy and physiology, embryology, genetics, microbiology, immunology, cellular biology, exercise physiology, kinesiology, general chemistry, organic chemistry, analytical chemistry, biochemistry, toxicology/pharmacology, nutrition, nuclear medicine, physics, biomechanics, and statistics. Chiropractic programs require at least 4,200 hours of combined classroom, laboratory, and clinical experience.

=== Australia ===
The Chiropractors' Association of Australia has provided instructions for students who intend on becoming registered chiropractors in Australia. The profession is regulated by the Australian Health Practitioner Regulation Agency (AHPRA).

=== Canada ===
There are currently two schools of chiropractic in Canada: Canadian Memorial Chiropractic College, in Toronto, Ontario and the Université du Québec à Trois-Rivières, in Trois-Rivieres, Quebec. Both programs are fully accredited by the Canadian Federation of Chiropractic Regulatory and Educational Accrediting Boards. In 2010, the majority of students (87%) entering the CMCC program had completed a baccalaureate university degree, and approximately 3% have a graduate degree. The CMCC program is a privately funded institution and requires four years of full-time study, including a 12-month clinical internship. The UQTR and CMCC programs both include courses in anatomy, biochemistry, embryology, immunology, microbiology, neurology, clinical nutrition, pathology, physiology, principles of chiropractic, radiology, and other basic and clinical medical sciences.

Pilot projects involving doctors of chiropractic in hospital emergency rooms in the province of Ontario were underway in 2011, but as of 2020 the website states chiropractors only see patients based on referral. Canadian Chiropractic Examining Board requires all candidates to complete a 12-month clinical internship to obtain licensure, as well as write a total of three exams in their fourth year of study. Candidates must successfully pass Components A and B (Written Cognitive Skills Examination) to be eligible for the Clinical Skills Examination.

=== Germany ===
In December 2009, Jann-Oliver Broschinski and Friso Krüger had founded the Chiropraktik Akademie (Chiropractic Academy) from the Berlin Chiropractic School. The aim of the academy is the training of principled chiropractors who meet the standard of the WHO Guidelines for the Training and Safety for Chiropractors. The academy is located in Bad Oeynhausen, Germany, and received its accreditation from Stiftung Akkreditierungsrat (German Accreditation Council) in Bachelor and Master of Science in Chiropractic. As of now, the Chiropraktik Akademie's programmes are not accredited by the European Council for Chiropractic Education (ECCE), which is the European organization to accredit officially recognized programmes of Chiropractic education. Furthermore, the Chiropraktik Akademie is not listed as one of the NBCE approved colleges to take the American national board exams, which are the oldest chiropractic licensing exams existing.

=== South Africa ===
In South Africa (SA) there are two schools offering chiropractic: the Durban Institute of Technology and the University of Johannesburg. Both offer a 6-year full-time course leading to a Masters of Technology (M.Tech.) in Chiropractic; the course comprises two years of basic sciences followed by four years specialising in chiropractic, and incorporates a research dissertation. In order to practice in SA chiropractors are required to complete an internship, and must be registered with the Allied Health Professions Council of SA (AHPCSA) the relevant governmental statutory body. Membership of the Chiropractic Association of SA (CASA) is voluntary; CASA is the profession's sole national association and aims to promote Chiropractic through publications in newspaper, interviews, internet and other public inquiries.

=== South Korea ===
Hanseo University, located in Seosan, South Korea, has a CCEA accredited chiropractic program, the planning for which started in 1997.

=== United Kingdom ===
In 1993, HRH Princess Diana visited the Anglo-European College of Chiropractic and became its patron. She also appeared at a news conference that launched a report calling for legislation to prevent unqualified individuals from practicing Chiropractic in the UK. In 1994, Parliament passed legislation regulating the practice of Chiropractic, like other health care professions, and created the General Chiropractic Council (GCC) as the regulatory board. Since that time, it is illegal to call oneself a Chiropractor in the UK without being registered with the GCC. There are currently three UK chiropractic colleges with chiropractic courses recognised by the GCC.

The McTimoney College of Chiropractic offers an Integrated Masters in Chiropractic (MChiro) programme and two post-graduate Masters programmes in Animal Manipulation, plus a masters in Paediatric Chiropractic. The Anglo-European College of Chiropractic also offers an Integrated Masters in Chiropractic (MChiro) programme as well as three post-graduate programmes. The Welsh Institute of Chiropractic (WIOC) is a chiropractic training centre integrated within the University of South Wales offering an integrated undergraduate degree course in Chiropractic.

It is a legal requirement that all chiropractors in the UK register with the GCC to practice. A minimum of 30 hours of Continuing Professional Development per year is required to remain a registered practicing chiropractor.

=== United States ===
Graduates of chiropractic schools receive the degree Doctor of Chiropractic (DC), and are eligible to seek licensure in all jurisdictions. The Council on Chiropractic Education (CCE) sets minimum guidelines for chiropractic colleges; all 18 chiropractic institutions are accredited by the CCE. The minimum prerequisite for enrollment in a chiropractic college set forth by the CCE is 3 years (90 semester hours) of undergraduate study, and the minimum cumulative GPA for a student entering is 3.0 on a 4.0 scale. Recommended prerequisite classes may include those of the biological, chemical, and physical sciences, including: human anatomy and physiology, embryology, genetics, microbiology, immunology, cellular biology, exercise physiology, kinesiology, general chemistry, organic chemistry, analytical chemistry, biochemistry, toxicology/pharmacology, nutrition, nuclear medicine, physics, biomechanics, and statistics.

In 2024, Oregon Public Broadcasting reported on the high debt burden of students who pursued degrees in alternative medicine. Ten different chiropractic programs were ranked among the 47 US graduate programs with highest debt to earnings ratios. Analyses by Quackwatch and the Sunlight Foundation found high rates of default on Health Education Assistance Loan (HEAL) student loans used for chiropractic programs. Among health professionals who were listed as in default on HEAL loans in 2012, 53% were chiropractors.

== Accreditation ==
Chiropractic is governed internationally by the Councils on Chiropractic Education International (CCEI). This body is officially recognized by the World Federation of Chiropractic and the World Health Organization as the accrediting agency for schools of chiropractic around the world.

Chiropractic education standards in the United States are established by the Council on Chiropractic Education (CCE), which is recognized by the U.S. Department of Education as the official accrediting agency for Doctor of Chiropractic (D.C.) programs. Admission to a chiropractic program typically requires at least 90 semester hours of undergraduate coursework, often including studies in biology, chemistry, and physics. The chiropractic curriculum involves a minimum of 4,200 hours of combined classroom, laboratory, and clinical education over four years. Students must complete comprehensive training in basic sciences, clinical sciences, diagnostic imaging, chiropractic techniques, and professional ethics. Additionally, successful completion of the National Board of Chiropractic Examiners (NBCE) examinations is required for licensure in most states.

In 2005, in efforts to improve consistency and equivalency in chiropractic training, the WHO published basic training and safety guidelines to provide international minimum requirements for chiropractic education and to serve as a reference for national authorities in establishing an examination and licensing system for the qualified practice of chiropractic.
