= Seosan Song clan =

Korean clan from South Chungcheong Province

- Country: Korea
- Current region: Seosan
- Founder: Song Mun ik

Seosan Song clan (Korean: 서산 송씨; Hanja: 瑞山 宋氏) was one of the Korean clans. Their Bon-gwan was in Seosan, South Chungcheong Province. According to the research in 2000, the number of Seosan Song clan is 2713. Their founder was Song Mun ik who was a descendant of Song Ju eun. Song Ju eun was from Zingzhao country in Tang dynasty and served as a Ministry of Revenue. Song Mun ik was appointed as Prince of Seosan (Hanja: 瑞山君) during Chungnyeol of Goryeo’s reign in Goryeo. Song Mun ik’s descendant began Seosan Song clan.

== See also ==
- Korean clan names of foreign origin
