= Ethnoveterinary medicine =

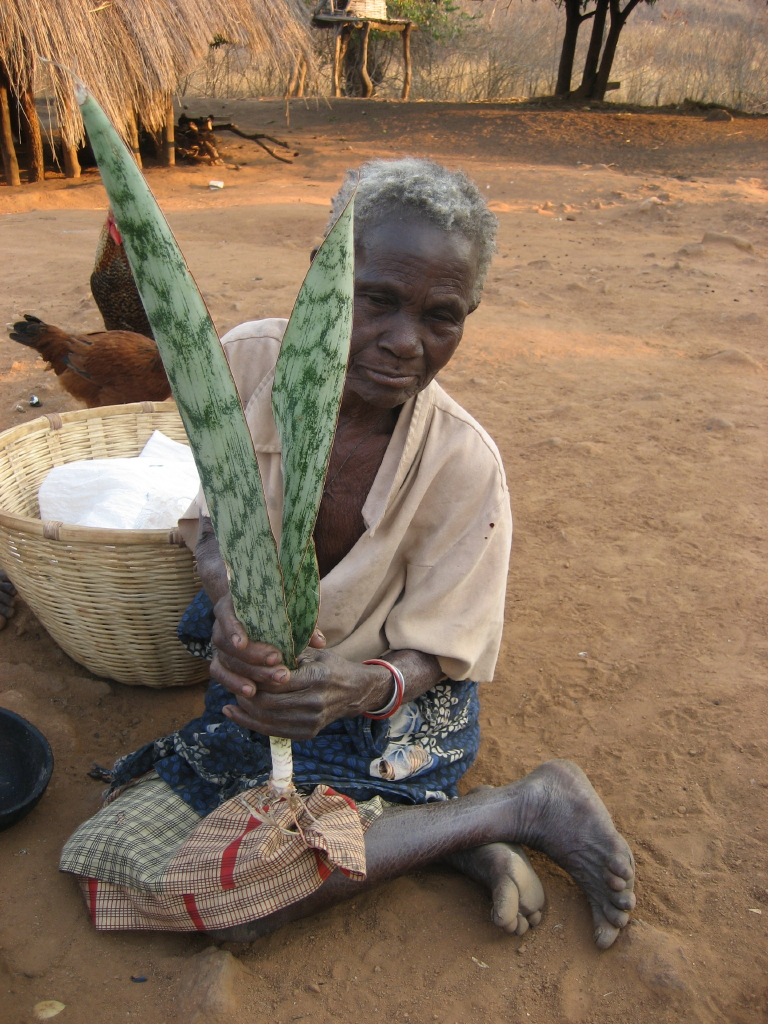
Rufina James of Humbe, Manica Province Mozambique shows the Sansevieria hyacinthoides she uses to treat chicken diseases

Ethnoveterinary medicine (EVM) considers that traditional practices of veterinary medicine are legitimate and seeks to validate them (Köhler-Rollefson and Bräunig, 1998). Many non-Western traditions of veterinary medicine exist, such as acupuncture and herbal medicine in China, Tibetan veterinary medicine, Ayurveda in India, etc. These traditions have written records that go back thousands of years, for example the Jewish sources in the Old Testament and Talmud and the Sri Lankan 400-year-old palm-leaf frond records of veterinary treatments (Hadani and Shimshony, 1994). Since colonial times scientists had always taken note of indigenous knowledge of animal health and diagnostic skills before implementing their Western-technology projects (Köhler-Rollefson and Bräunig 1998).

== What Is EVM? ==
In the 1980s the term "Veterinary Anthropology" was coined for a particular approach to animal health care, which was researched through "using the basic repertoire of anthropology's research skills and techniques, including observation, interview and participation" (Köhler-Rollefson and Bräunig, 1998). Ethnoveterinary medicine or ethnoveterinary research was defined by McCorkle in 1995 as:

The holistic, interdisciplinary study of local knowledge and its associated skills, practices, beliefs, practitioners, and social structures pertaining to the healthcare and healthful husbandry of food, work, and other income-producing animals, always with an eye to practical development applications within livestock production and livelihood systems, and with the ultimate goal of increasing human well-being via increased benefits from stockraising.

Stock owners continue to utilize EVM until better alternatives in terms of efficacy, low cost, availability and ease of administration, are found. By far the most-studied element of EVM is veterinary ethnopharmacopoeia, especially botanicals. Besides, several studies published in recent years (e.g., Confessor et al., 2009; Froemming, 2006, Souto et al. 2011a, b) have demonstrated the importance of animals as sources of remedies used in medicine for Ethnoveterinary..

Ethnoveterinary and human ethnomedicine practices overlap in several parts of the world. Parallels between medicinal practices in human and animal ethnomedicine not only include the types of resources used and the prevalence of use of those wildlife resources, but also in the modes of administration of these remedies and the ethnomedical techniques employed (see McCorkle and Martin, 1998; Souto et al., 2011a, b).

== Justification of studies ==
According to Tabuti et al. (2003) and others, systematic studies on EVM can be justified for three main reasons:

1. they can generate useful information needed to develop livestock healing practices and methods that are suited to the local environment,
2. EVM could be a key veterinary resource and could add useful new drugs to the pharmacopoeia, and
3. EVM can contribute to biodiversity conservation.

Besides, the overlap between natural resources traditionally used as medicines for both humans and animals may be indicative of the efficacy of these remedies

== Organizations ==
Developing world institutes involved in EVM include Brazil's Universidade Federal da Paraíba/Universidade Estadual da Paraíba, Mexico's Universidad Nacional Autónoma de Chiapas, Ethiopia's Addis Ababa University, the School of Veterinary Medicine of the University of the West Indies, and Rwanda's University Centre for Research on Traditional Pharmacology and Medicine.

The Heifer Project International works in Cameroon with herders and healers experienced in EVM. The League for Pastoral People (L.P.P.) has worked with camel pastoralists in Rajasthan, India and has produced a field manual on camel diseases. Recent research on EVM in the developed world has come from Italy (Pieroni, 2004), British Columbia, Canada (Lans et al., 2006) and the Netherlands (van Asseldonk).

== Women and EVM ==
The importance of gender is being increasingly recognised in EVM. One of the first studies to document gender was conducted by Diana Davis who noted a difference in knowledge of EVM of Afghan Pashtun nomads that paralleled the gender-based division in the society. Davis found that women know more about healthcare for newborns and very sick animals that are taken care of near the home. Since women prepare the carcass for consumption they know twice as many types of internal parasites as men. Women also help with dystocias and the manual removal of ectoparasites.

Another study is that of the Tzotzil Maya shepherdesses who developed their own breed of sheep and have their own husbandry and healthcare system based on their traditions (Perezgrovas, 1996).

In research conducted in Trinidad it was noted that male farmers were using the reproductive knowledge of their female relatives to assist in the health care of their ruminants. Female farmers were using the same plants for their animals that they used for themselves (Lans, 2004).

ANTHRA, an organization of women veterinary scientists, has been documenting and validating EVM since 1996 in different parts of the states of Andhra Pradesh and Maharashtra in India (Ghotge, 2002). ANTHRA chose to study EVM because women farmers performed 50 – 90% of all daily activities related to livestock care but were denied aspects of the local EVM because knowledge was traditionally passed from father to son.

Women are not trained as traditional Dinka healers (atet) in Sudan (VSF/Switzerland, 1998). However, female-headed households are increasing in Sudan due to war, and women are thus more visible as livestock rearers.

== Validation ==
Herbal remedies used for hundreds of years by stockraisers can be put to commercial use, but scientists are demanding that traditional knowledge should be validated, to verify the safety and efficacy of the treatments.

IT Kenya has a project in the Samburu District that is investigating effective EVM treatments. Vetaid is collaborating with the Animal Disease Research Institute of Dar es Salaam in Tanzania while the Christian Veterinary Mission is investigating EVM in Karamoja, Uganda. Other organizations in the field are ANTHRA and SEVA in India, ITDG and KEPADA in Kenya and World Concern in Uganda (Mathias, 2004). Studies on EVM have been commissioned by UNICEF.

- Wanyama (1997) researched and documented information on most confidently used Ethnoveterinary Knowledge among Pastoralists of Samburu, Kenya. The information which was published in a booklet titled "Confidently Used Ethnoveterinary Knowledge among Pastoralists of Samburu" identifies and provides detailed descriptions of top-ten ethnoveterinary practices most confidently used by ethnoveterinary practitioners of Samburu and Turkana communities, in Samburu County, Kenya. The book also attempts to present a methodology that can enable an ethnoveterinary researcher to screen remedies for further scientific trials and value addition.
- Gauthuma (2004) tested the efficacy of Myrsine africana, Albizia anthelmintica and Hildebrandtia sepalosa against mixed natural helminthosis in sheep (Haemonchus spp, Trichostrogylus spp and Oesophagostomum spp) in the Samburu district of Kenya. Healers were included in the study and the extracts were prepared following traditional methods including mortar and pestle. Albizia anthelmintica and Hilderbrantia sepalosa treatments showed significant improvement over controls from day 4 after treatment to day 12. On day 12 the three plant remedies showed 100% efficacy while albendazole had an efficacy of 63%.
- Six of the 17 plant extracts used by the Hausa and other tribes of Northern Nigeria for symptoms probably indicative of viral illness were found to have antiviral activity (Kudi and Myint, 1999). The extracts of Eugenia uniflora, Acacia artaxacantha, Terminalia ivorensis, T. superba and Alchornea cordifolia showed trypanocidal activity (Adewunmi, 2001).
- The International Centre of Insect Physiology and Ecology in Kenya is evaluating 40 natural products used against ticks by the Bukusu people in Bungoma District (Wanzala, in process).
- The Onderstepoort Veterinary Institute in South Africa is screening the plants used in EVM for biological activity (Van der Merwe, 2002). Other work in South Africa has been conducted by Masika (2002).
- The anthelmintic efficacies of Teminalia glaucescens (48.4%), Solanum aculeastrum (34.4%), Khaya anthoteca (55.8%) and Vernonia amygdalina (52.4%) were tested by Nfi (2001). Nfi and colleagues had previously tested the insecticidal activity of Nicotiana tabacum and Tephrosia vogelli and plan to test the acaricidal potential of Euphorbia kamerunica and Psorospermum guianensis.
- MacDonald (2004) found that the traditional form of usage of Chenopodium ambrosioides infusions as a vermifuge is safer than the use of the herb's essential oil.
- Iqbal (2004) compared the in vitro and in vivo anthelmintic activity of Artemisia brevifolia with levamisole. In vitro studies revealed anthelmintic effects of crude aqueous (CAE) and methanol extracts (CME) of Artemisia brevifolia (whole plant) on live Haemonchus contortus as evident from their paralysis and/or mortality at 6 h post exposure. For in vivo studies, the whole plant of Artemisia brevifolia was administered as crude powder (CP), CAE and CME at graded doses (1, 2 and 3 g kg(−1) body weight (b.w.) to sheep naturally infected with mixed species of gastrointestinal nematodes. Maximum reduction (67.2%) in eggs per gram (EPG) of faeces was recorded on day 14 post treatment in sheep treated with Artemisia brevifolia CAE at 3 g kg(−1) b.w. Levamisole produced a 99.2% reduction in EPG. However, increase in EPG reduction was noted with an increase in the dose of Artemisia brevifolia administered as CP, CAE and CME.
- Githiori (2004) tested seven plant preparations of Hagenia abyssinica, Olea europaea var. africana, Annona squamosa, Ananas comosus, Dodonaea angustifolia, Hildebrandtia sepalosa and Azadirachta indica in 151 lambs infected with 5000 or 3000 L3 Haemonchus contortus in 3 experiments and all were found to be ineffective.

Chinese medicine is also being investigated; treatments historically used for large animals are now being tested on pets. Nagle (2001) conducted a randomized, double-blind, placebo-controlled trial of P07P, a product derived from a traditional Chinese herbal remedy. There was a positive result, but it was not statistically significant.

Blanco (1999) found that traditional veterinary knowledge of Galicia, northwest Spain was still thriving due to distrust of the veterinary service. However, the traditional system of holding IK as oral knowledge of certain elders is not necessarily a panacea. Stories of loss are recorded in Giday (2003) and in (Ayisi, 1994).

The PRELUDE database on traditional veterinary medicine has over 5000 plant-based prescriptions for livestock disorders with each plant listed by family.

== Environment, epidemiology and health ==
EVM in future may be increasingly linked to discussions and research on ecosystem health. EVM is now increasingly integrated into "participatory epidemiology" which seeks to improve epidemiological surveillance in remote areas and encourage community participation in disease control (Mathias, 2004). EVM is also studied to provide solutions to diseases in which antigen variation has made vaccination unrealistic and drug resistant strains to Western medicines have become prevalent (Atawodi, 2002).

== Journals ==
- Ethnobiology and Conservation
- Journal of Ethnopharmacology
- Journal of Ethnobiology and Ethnomedicine

== See also ==
- Traditional Chinese veterinary medicine
