= Veterinary chiropractic =

Application of chiropractic medicine on animals

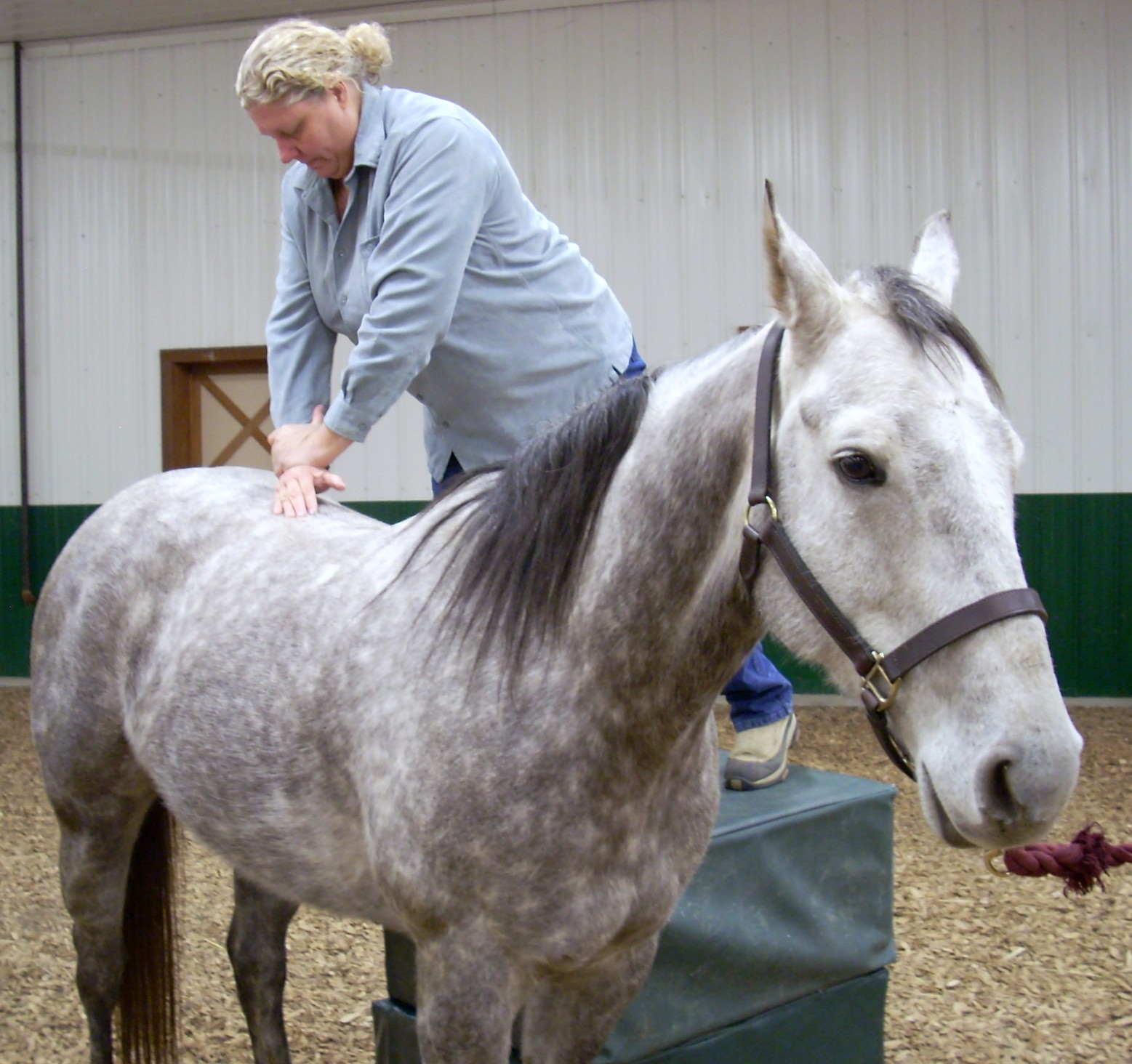
Chiropractic performed on a horse

Veterinary chiropractic, also known as animal chiropractic, is the application of chiropractic—a type of spinal manipulation—on animals. Veterinary chiropractors typically treat horses, racing greyhounds, and pets. Veterinary chiropractic is a controversial method due to a lack of evidence as to the efficacy of chiropractic methods. Contrary to traditional medicine, chiropractic therapies are alternative medicine. There is some degree of risk associated with even skilled manipulation in animals as the potential for injury exists with any technique used. The founder of chiropractic, Daniel David Palmer, used the method on animals, partly to challenge claims that the placebo effect was responsible for favorable results in humans. Chiropractic treatment of large animals dates back to the early 1900s. As of 2019, many states in the US provide statutory or regulatory guidelines for the practice of chiropractic and related treatments on animals, generally requiring some form of veterinary involvement.

== History ==
Chiropractic treatment of large animals dates back to the early 1900s. The founder of the field of chiropractic, spiritualist Daniel David Palmer, used the method on animals, partly to challenge claims that the placebo effect was responsible for favorable results in humans. In the early 1980s, it began to be seen on the margins of veterinary medicine. By the late 1980s, a veterinarian who also was a chiropractor, Sharon Willoughby, developed a training program. With the emergence of veterinary chiropractic, both doctors of chiropractic (DCs) and veterinary medicine (DVMs) became able to take additional training to become certified in veterinary chiropractic.

== Efficacy and safety ==
Aside from the common treatment of racehorses, greyhounds, and pets, some animal chiropractors perform adjustments on exotic animals, such as birds, dolphins, elephants, iguanas, turkeys, pigs, and llamas. Veterinary chiropractic is considered a controversial method due to limited evidence of the efficacy of osteopathic or chiropractic methods in equine therapy. There is limited evidence supporting the effectiveness of spinal manipulation or mobilization for equine pain management, and the efficacy of specific equine manual therapy techniques is mostly anecdotal. One study done in 2021 by a practicing veterinarian-chiropractor on Boxers showed successful signs that veterinary chiropractic treatment may reduce the probability of early development of spondylosis in young Boxers. Another study, done on racehorses, found significant changes in thoracolumbar and pelvic kinematics with veterinary chiropractic treatment but stated larger sample sizes and clinical trials are needed. The practice remains controversial.

There is some degree of risk associated with even skilled manipulation in animals as the potential for injury exists with any technique used. This risk may increase in the presence of structural diseases, such as equine cervical vertebral malformation (CVM) or canine intervertebral disk disease. Horses have been hurt by very forceful animal chiropractic movements. Adjusting the spine of a dog with a degenerative disk runs the risk of serious injury to the spinal cord.

== Practice ==
=== Clinical ===
The American Veterinary Medical Association (AVMA) guidelines recommend that a veterinarian should examine an animal and establish a preliminary diagnosis before any alternative treatment, like chiropractic, is initiated. Before performing a chiropractic adjustment, the chiropractor examines the animal's gait, posture, vertebrae, and extremities. The chiropractor may also make neurological evaluations. In addition to spinal manipulation, other adjustive procedures can be performed to the extremity joints and cranial sutures. Those who specialize in horses are referred to as "equine chiropractors."

== Certification and requirements ==
There are two certifying agencies in North America, the American Veterinary Chiropractic Association (AVCA) and the International Veterinary Chiropractic Association(IVCA). Earning certification from either agency requires attending an approved animal chiropractic program followed by AVCA or IVCA written and clinical examinations. In some locations, a veterinarian must supervise the treatment or provide a referral for the treatment by a veterinary chiropractor.

The JAVMA describes chiropractic as a complementary and alternative treatment (CAVM). Other CAVM treatments include acupuncture and physical therapy. The AVMA Model Veterinary Practice Act includes CAVM in the definition of veterinary medicine, and that standard has been adopted in 20 states as of 2016. Different provisions are listed for each individual state regarding the use of CAVM on animals, most of which require some type of veterinary input such as supervision or referral. Veterinary chiropractic is not recognized by the American Chiropractic Association as being chiropractic.
