= Garorim Bay Tidal Power Station =

Planned tidal power plant in Garorim Bay on the west coast of South Korea

Coordinates: 36.9585°N 126.322611°E

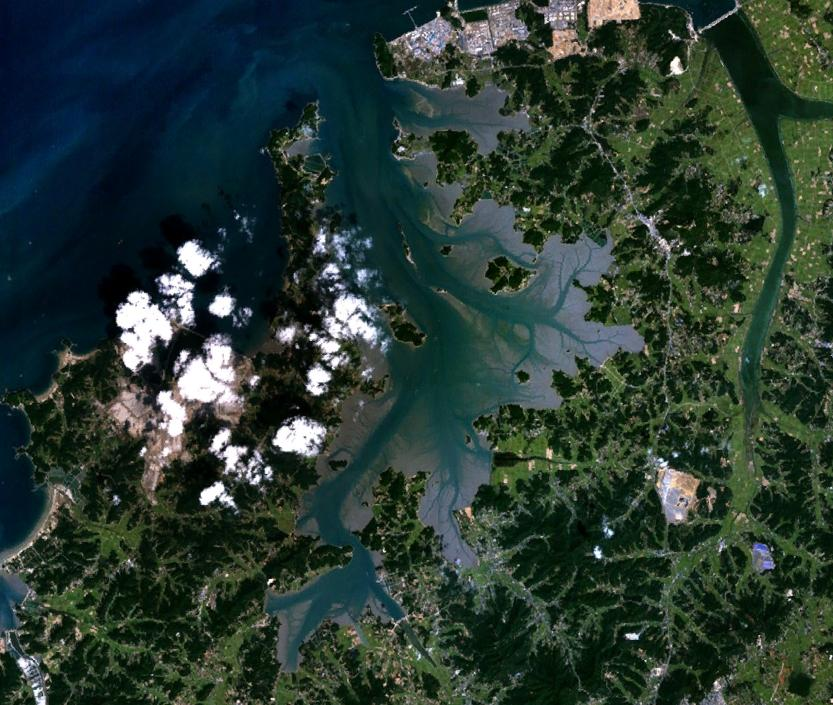
Garorim Bay

Garorim Bay Tidal Power Station is a planned tidal power plant in Garorim Bay, on the west coast of South Korea. The project is developed by Korea Western Power Company Limited and was in the process of receiving government approval as of November 2008.

== Description ==
Garorim Bay is located between Seosan City and Taean County of Chungnam Province, South Korea, at the western seashore of South Korea. The electric power generation capacity of the plant will be 520 megawatt (26 MW * 20 sets). This is more than twice the capacity of the Rance Power Plant in France.

According to an announcement made by the power company, construction cost was estimated to be 1 trillion Korean won (1 billion US dollars) as of 2005.

== History ==
In 1981, the Assessment Report on the Construction of Tidal Power Plant in Garorim Bay was issued. Environmental research conducted by Korean Ocean Research and Development Institute and supported by UNESCO was partly used in this assessment. The report assessed that the project was economically efficient. However, in 1986, as oil prices went down and construction costs rose, the project was assessed as economically inefficient. The economic efficiency was assessed again from 2004 to 2005, and the basic design was completed as of March 2007.

A news reporter reported that the benefit/cost ratio was assessed to be only 0.87 in articles written in 2007.

== Environmental impact ==
Garorim Bay is regarded as one of the important tidal flats in South Korea. The Korean government included this bay in the National Wetland Inventory. The Yellow Sea Large Marine Ecosystem (YSLME) Project, managed by the United Nations Development Programme and the Global Environment Facility, also surveyed the ecology of this bay.

According to a survey on fishery resources in 1981, supported by the Korean Ocean Research and Development Institute, this bay is an important spawning ground for many species of fish. The study predicted that the plant's construction would cause critical damage to the bay's ecology.

The bay is one of the most important fish farming sites in Korea, composed of about 2000 fishery households.

== Response of local fishermen ==
On 20 August 2007, the power company tried to hold a Hearing from Residents, an official proceeding required by the Environmental Impact Assessment (EIA). But about 1000 fishermen, demanding cancellation of the entire project, prevented the hearing from being held so the EIA requirement would not be met.

== Relation to renewable energy strategy ==
Garorim Bay Tidal Power Plant Project is now being included in the South Korean government's renewable energy strategy. The Korean government classifies tidal power as renewable, and the Garorim Bay Project is included in the renewable energy plan which the government announced in September 2008.

The Korean Federation for Environmental Movement (Friends of the Earth Korea) has criticized the project, arguing that the power plant is contrary to the purpose of renewable energy, because it would destroy the valuable tidal flats in the area, thus accelerating global warming.
