= Canadian Memorial Chiropractic College =

Private chiropractic school in Toronto, Ontario

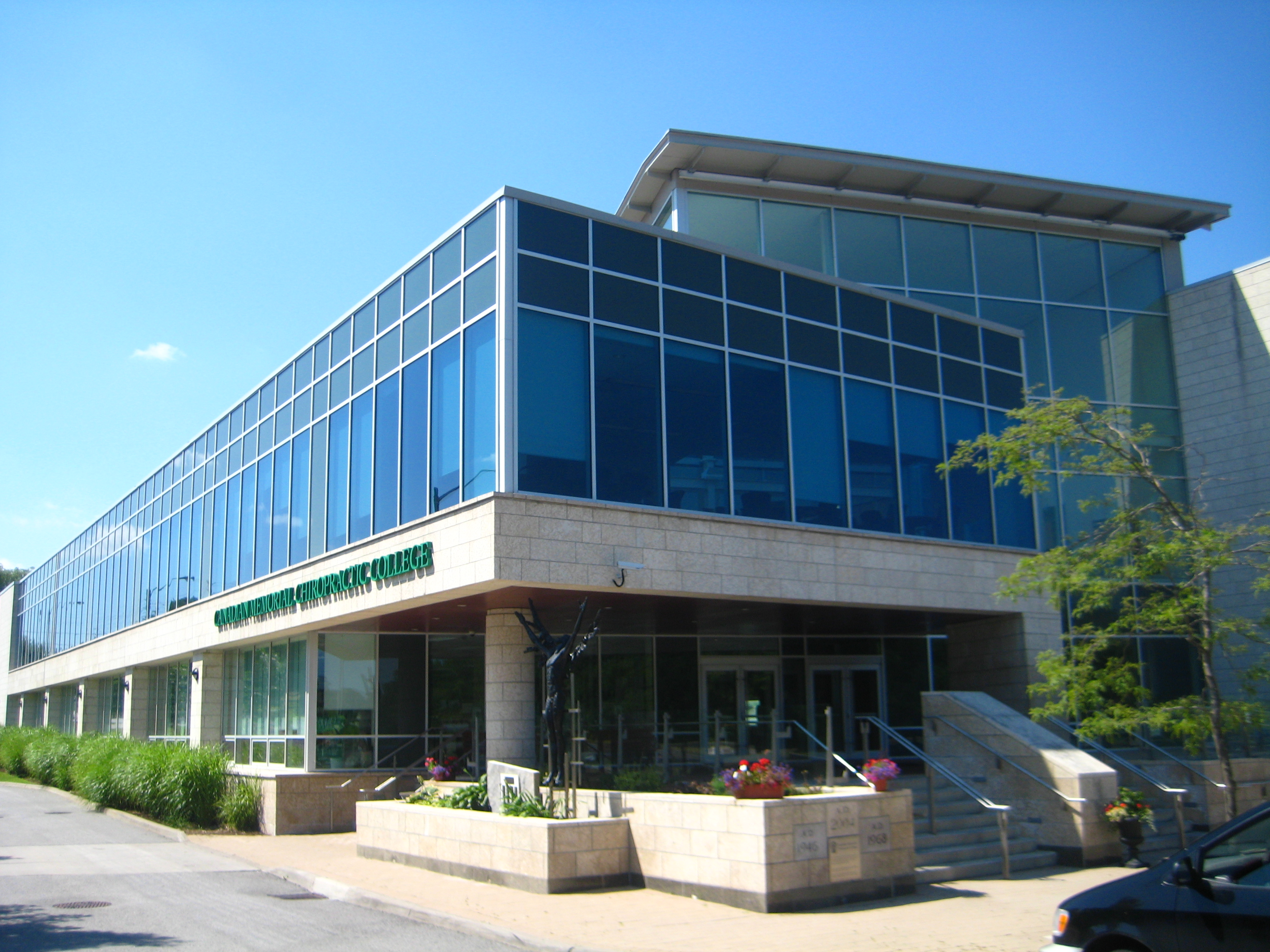
- Type: Private
- Established: 1945
- President: Dr. Christine Bradaric-Baus
- Students: ~800
- Location: 6100 Leslie Street, Toronto, Ontario, M2H 3J1, Canada; 43.8039°N 79.37186°W
- Campus: Urban
- Website: www.cmcc.ca

Canadian Memorial Chiropractic College (CMCC) is a Canadian private chiropractic education school in North York, Toronto, founded in 1945. CMCC awards Doctor of Chiropractic degrees under ministerial consent from the provincial Ministry of Colleges and Universities.

== Education ==
CMCC's Doctor of Chiropractic program, a post-secondary professional educational program, is accredited by the Council on Chiropractic Education Canada of the Federation of Canadian Chiropractic Regulatory and Educational Accrediting Boards.

In 2023, CMCC was designated as a school of anatomy, and has access to a cadaver lab under the authority of the Anatomy Act of the Province of Ontario.

=== Undergraduate ===
CMCC's undergraduate program is a second entry degree program. It is required for applicants to have completed at least three years of university level education prior to their admission. The curriculum consists of 4,200+ hours of education broken into four years of study. The first two years of study emphasize foundational biological science courses (anatomy, pathology, physiology, microbiology, etc.), whereas the final two years include professional courses in chiropractic studies, psychomotor skills, clinical education, business, jurisprudence, ethics, research, professionalism, etc. The fourth year consists of two six-month internships in CMCC community-based clinics, or on an externship basis.

=== Graduate ===
CMCC's Graduate Studies program offers advanced study in clinical skills, research, teaching, learning and leadership. The Chiropractic Residency Programs include Diagnostic Imaging, Clinical and Sports Sciences.

As of September 2017, the Work Disability Prevention program is now offered in collaboration with the University of Ontario Institute of Technology (UOIT).

== Research ==
The foundation of CMCC's research agenda includes special research centres – one which studies the biomechanics of treatment and outcome, and another to study implications on health policy and patient access to treatment. In 2012, in collaboration with the University of Ontario Institute of Technology (UOIT), CMCC opened the Centre for Disability Prevention and Rehabilitation.

The completion of a research-related literature synthesis is a requirement of the Doctor of Chiropractic program. An elective research project is available to those students who have special interest or are considering a research track in their career.

The CMCC campus has research laboratories, including a Biomechanics and Elastography Laboratory, a Tissue Testing Laboratory, a Materials Fabrication Laboratory, a Neurophysiology Laboratory, and a Cellular and Molecular Biology and Histology Laboratory.

In 2001, CMCC established the McMorland Family Research Chair in Mechanobiology, the research chair position in an independent chiropractic institution.

== Patient care ==
The Division of Clinical Education offers clinical services at eight clinics in the Greater Toronto Area (GTA).

Since 2012, CMCC has had an expanded presence at the Family Health Team clinic, part of the Department of Family and Community Medicine at Toronto's St. Michael's Hospital.

== Notable alumni ==
- Josh Binstock, Olympic volleyball player
- Colin Carrie, politician
- Gary Goodyear, politician
- Coby Iwaasa, World Champion racquetball player
- Derek Porter, Olympic Champion and World Champion rower

== See also ==
- List of chiropractic schools
- Canadian College of Naturopathic Medicine
- Higher education in Ontario
