= Christian Veterinary Mission =

Christian Veterinary Mission is a missionary sending organization founded by Leroy Dorminy in 1979 and based in Seattle, Washington.

As stated on their website, "Christian Veterinary Mission seeks to help veterinarians serve others and live out their Christian faith through their profession. We seek to change lives and communities by improving the care of livestock and other animals."

The organization's primary activities involve sending and supporting veterinary missionaries both overseas and within the United States. These missionaries participate in various ministries depending on their location and personal gifts, including livestock development, evangelism, ethno-veterinary medicine, church planting, and capacity building of local communities. Missionaries may participate in long term or short term opportunities. Christian Veterinary Mission currently supports 36 veterinarians in long-term missions in 17 different countries.

Other Christian Veterinary Mission ministries include professional outreach and student outreach. The mission supports a Christian Veterinary fellowship student chapter at each of the 28 veterinary colleges in the United States.

Effective June 30, 2021, CVM separated from CRISTA Ministries to become an independent non-profit organization.
