= Cleveland University-Kansas City =

Private university in Kansas, United States

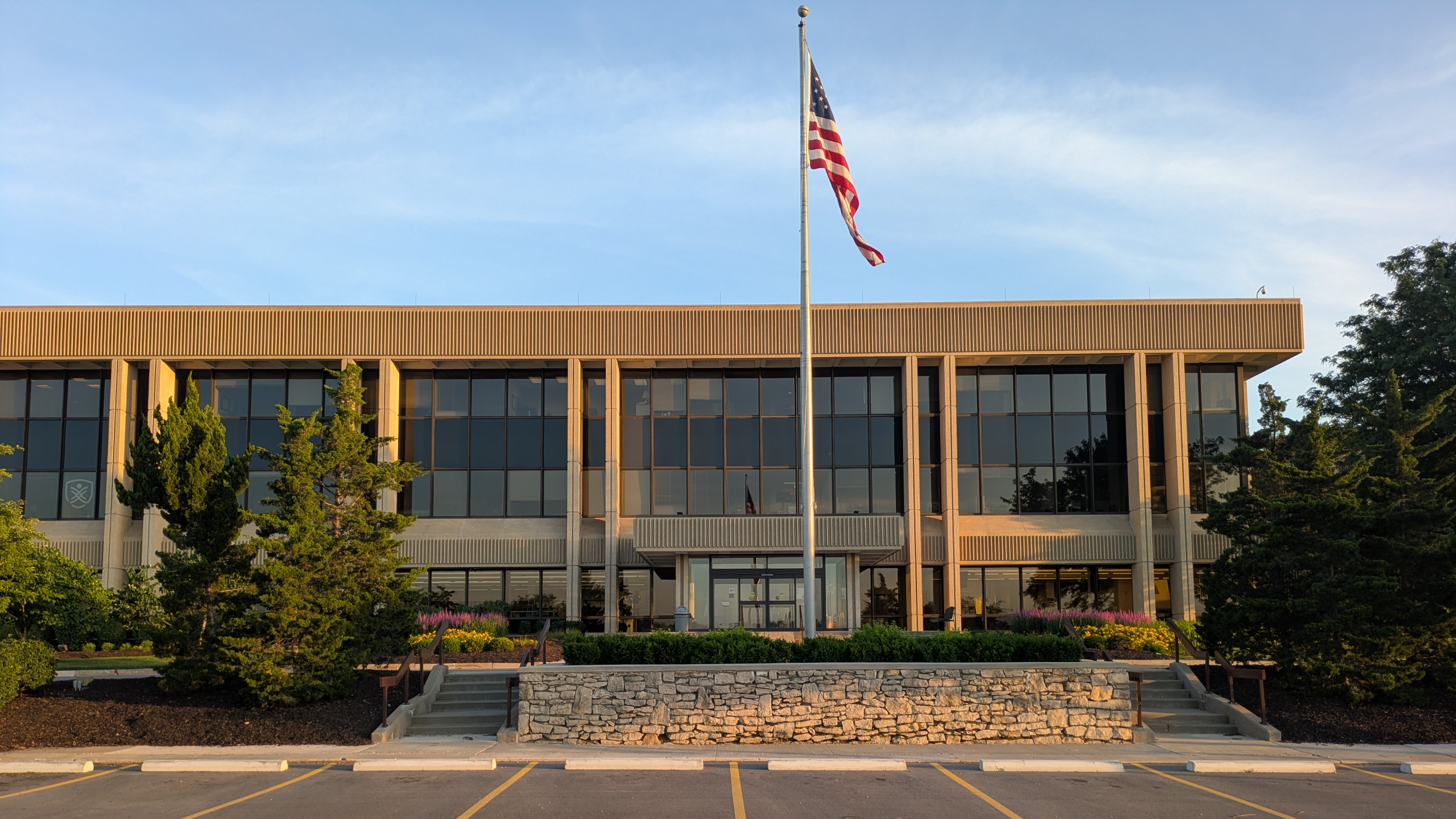
- Rear entrance of Cleveland University-Kansas City
- Former name: Cleveland Chiropractic College
- Type: Private university
- Established: 1922
- President: Carl S. Cleveland, III
- Academic staff: 33
- Administrative staff: 22
- Students: 492
- Undergraduates: 39
- Postgraduates: 449
- Location: Overland Park, Kansas, United States; 38.932024°N 94.679189°W
- Website: www.cleveland.edu

Cleveland University-Kansas City (CUKC) is a private university in Overland Park, Kansas, United States. It is known primarily for its chiropractic doctorate program (D.C.) but it also offers associate, bachelor's, and master's degrees. The university has been in operation in the Kansas City area since 1922 and has occupied its current 34-acre Overland Park, Kansas, location since 2008.

== History ==
Cleveland University-Kansas City was founded in 1922 as the Central College of Chiropractic. The founders of the school were one of the first families of chiropractic, C. S. and Ruth Cleveland, and Perl B. Griffin. All three were graduates of Palmer College of Chiropractic. After two years Central College of Chiropractic was renamed Cleveland Chiropractic College.

In 1951, the college absorbed the Ratledge System of Chiropractic Schools in Los Angeles. The institution was rechartered as Cleveland Chiropractic College of Los Angeles in 1955. In 2008, the university relocated its Kansas City, Missouri, location across the border to a facility in Overland Park, Kansas, that previously housed Farmers Insurance. The Los Angeles campus subsequently closed and merged operations with the main campus in 2011.

In 2015, Cleveland Chiropractic College changed the name of the institution to Cleveland University-Kansas City. "The name change and expanded identity supports the university's degree program expansion, and is centered around the university's vision for providing leadership in health science and health promotion education," said Carl S. Cleveland III, university president and leader of the university's 10-year strategic plan. Today, the university is led by Carl S. Cleveland III, the grandson of the founders.

== Academics ==
The university offers undergraduate, graduate, and certificate programs in the health sciences. It is accredited by the Higher Learning Commission. Some specific programs are also accredited by discipline-specific accreditors such as the Council on Chiropractic Education, Council on Accreditation of Strength and Conditioning Education (CASCE), and Joint Review Committee on Education in Radiologic Technology (JRCERT).

== See also ==
- List of chiropractic schools
- Chiropractic
