= Livestock keepers' rights =

Livestock Keepers' Rights are a bundle of rights that would support the survival of small-scale livestock keepers such as pastoralists, smallholders and family farms in a general policy environment that favours large-scale industrial modes of livestock production. In the context of the current anti-livestock agenda and the claim by commercial interests that livestock will be eliminated by 2035, they are gaining added traction.

The term "Livestock Keepers' Rights" was coined during the World Food Summit in 2002 by civil society attending the Forum for Food Sovereignty to flag the role of livestock keepers in animal genetic resource management. It alluded to "Farmers' Rights" as known from the International Treaty on Plant Genetic Resources for Food and Agriculture that had been recently concluded.

== Background ==
Between 2003 and 2007, a large number of grassroots consultations were carried out by and with livestock-keeping communities to define the term more closely. These consultations took place in Kenya ("Karen Commitment"), India, Italy ("Bellagio Brief") and Ethiopia ("Addis Résumé") and involved about 500 representatives of livestock keeping communities from Africa, Asia, Latin America and Europe. They identified 7 cornerstones of "Livestock Keepers' Rights" that would enable livestock keepers to continue playing their role as guardians of biological diversity.

During this process, Livestock Keepers’ Rights were elaborated into a much more comprehensive concept than Farmers’ Rights. Rather than representing legal rights, they correspond to development principles that would help livestock keepers continue to conserve biodiversity and animal genetic resources.

== Principles and Rights ==
During a workshop with legal experts held in Kalk Bay, South Africa in December 2008, the rights were further refined and subdivided into principles and rights:

Principle 1: Livestock Keepers are creators of breeds and custodians of animal genetic resources for food and agriculture.

Principle 2: Livestock Keepers and the sustainable use of traditional breeds are dependent on the conservation of their respective ecosystems.

Principle 3: Traditional breeds represent collective property, products of indigenous knowledge and cultural expression of Livestock Keepers.

Based on these principles articulated and implicit in existing legal instruments and international agreements, Livestock Keepers from traditional livestock keeping communities and/or adhering to ecological principles of animal production, shall be given the following Livestock Keepers' Rights:

1. Livestock Keepers have the right to make breeding decisions and breed the breeds they maintain.
2. Livestock Keepers shall have the right to participate in policy formulation and implementation processes on animal genetic resources for food and agriculture.
3. Livestock Keepers shall have the right to appropriate training and capacity building and equal access to relevant services enabling and supporting them to raise livestock and to better process and market their products.
4. Livestock Keepers shall have the right to participate in the identification of research needs and research design with respect to their genetic resources, as is mandated by the principle of Prior Informed Consent.
5. Livestock Keepers shall have the right to effectively access information on issues related to their local breeds and livestock diversity.

== Declaration on Rights ==
The workshop also resulted in a Declaration on Livestock Keepers Rights that references the individual principles and rights to existing international legal frameworks such as the UN Convention on Biological Diversity, the United Nations Convention to Combat Desertification, the Global Plan of Action for Animal Genetic Resources and the Interlaken Declaration on Animal Genetic Resources, as well as the Universal Declaration of Human Rights, the International Covenant on Economic, Social and Cultural Rights, the United Nations Declaration on the Rights of Indigenous Peoples, the Convention on the Protection and Promotion of the Diversity of Cultural Expressions, the convention (No. 169) concerning Indigenous and Tribal Peoples in Independent Countries, the Declaration on the Rights of Persons Belonging to National or Ethnic, Religious and Linguistic Minorities, and other pertinent legal agreements.

The Declaration on Livestock Keepers’ Rights was signed by a large number of individuals and organizations. At an International Technical Expert Workshop on Access and Benefit Sharing in Animal Genetic Resources for Food and Agriculture, that was held in Wageningen in the Netherlands from 8–10 December 2010, it was decided that Livestock Keepers’ Rights should be addressed. At another workshop on rights to animal genetic resources that was held in Bern (Switzerland) on 20 June 2011, Livestock Keepers’ Rights were contrasted with Animal Breeders Rights. In July 2011, at a side-event during the 13th session of the Commission on Genetic Resources for Food and Agriculture (CGRFA) held at FAO in Rome, the concept of Livestock Keepers' Rights was introduced and supported by government officials.
