= Hanseo University =

Private university in South Korea

Coordinates: 36°41′26″N 126°35′02″E

- Type: Private
- President: Dr. Ham Kee-sun
- Location: South Korea
- Website: www.hanseo.ac.kr

Korean name
- Hangul: 한서대학교
- Hanja: 韓瑞大學校
- RR: Hanseo daehakgyo
- MR: Hansŏ taehakkyo

Hanseo University (Korean: 한서대학교) is a private university located in Seosan and Taean, South Korea. The university was established in 1992 and provides courses in a wide range of liberal arts, engineering and design disciplines.

== The Cradle of Chiropractic Education in Asia ==
HSU Chiropractic Program is accredited by The Council on Chiropractic Education Australasia. The Department of Chiropractic is also member of the Association of Chiropractic College and Consortium of Chiropractic Institutions Asia Pacific. HSU is an official IBCE and NBCE testing center, the only one in the Asia. This is DC and MS combined program.

== Hanseo International College of Aviation ==
Hanseo University is a private university located in Chungcheongnam-do, approximately 150 kilometers south of Seoul. The University was founded in late 1989 when the Korean Ministry of Education granted permission for its establishment. The groundbreaking ceremony for its main campus, located near the city of SeoSan, took place in April 1990 and it accepted its first undergraduate enrolments in March 1992. The University initially offered programs across ten departments: Mathematics, Physics, Chemistry, Electronic Statistics, Computer and Information, Electronic Engineering, Chemical Engineering, Clothing and Textiles, English and English Literature, and Chinese. In 1995 it offered its first post graduate programs with master's degrees available in Chemistry, Computer, Physics, Chemical Engineering, and English and English Literature. In 1996, the first graduates were produced with 207 individuals successfully completing their studies. In 2000, Dr. Ham Ki Sun (the University's founder) was inaugurated as its fifth president and subsequently adopted a strategy to evolve the University into an institution that specialized in the disciplines of Aeronautics, Arts and Design.

== Academics ==
=== Undergraduate ===
- Physical Therapy
- Nursing- Radiology
- Occupational Therapy
- Rehabilitation Technology
- Health Management
- Dental Hygiene
- Cosmetology
- Security and Secretarial Services
- Physical Activity Design
- Maritime Sports
- Motion Picture & Visual Arts (direction, staff, acting)
- Space Design
- Industrial Design
- Fashion Design
- Motion Graphics
- Contemporary Music
- Conservation of Cultural Heritage
- Children's Art Education
- Visual Design
- Mathematics
- Chemistry
- Biological Sciences
- Environmental Engineering
- Food, Chemical Biological Engineering
- Advanced Materials Science and Engineering
- Airport Architecture
- Civil Engineering
- Computer Engineering
- Electronic Engineering
- English
- Chinese
- Japanese
- Media Practical Korean Language & Literature
- Elderly Welfare
- International Relations
- Mass Communication and Journalism
- Child-Adolescent Welfare
- Public Administration
- Aeronautical Engineering
- Flight Operation
- Air Transportation & Logistics
- Air Tourism and Service
- Aerospace Software Engineering
- Avionics Engineering
- Helicopter Operation
- Unmanned Aircraft Systems
- Aviation and Leisure Industry

=== Graduate ===
The Graduate School was established in September 1995, as the heart of human resources training and research. It includes 27 departments for master's degree programs, 18 departments for doctoral degree programs, and four Professional Graduate Schools with 22 departments for master's degree programs.

- Doctor's Programs:

Chiropractic, Elderly Welfare, Child-Adolescent Welfare, Public Administration, Biology, Chemistry, Physical Therapy, Flight Operation and Management, Advanced Materials & Engineering, Architecture, Environmental Engineering, Digital Forensics, Lifelong Education, Cultural Properties, Healthcare, Aerospace Software Engineering, Construction Engineering, Convergence Design

- Master's Programs:

English Language and Literature, East Asian Studies, Elderly Welfare, Child-Adolescent Welfare, Public Administration, International Trade & Business, Aviation Tourism, Biology, Chemistry, Physical Therapy, Occupational Therapy, Flight Operation and Management, Radiological Science, Dental Hygiene, Air Transportation, Chemical Engineering, Advanced Materials & Engineering, Architecture, Environmental Engineering, Digital Forensics, Civil Engineering, Aerospace Software Engineering, Globalized International Relations, Lifelong Education, Rehabilitation Science, Optical and Electronic Engineering

- The Graduate School
- Graduate School of Health Promotion (Chiropractic, Natural Health Management, Radiological Science, Exercise Physiology and Prescription)
- Graduate School of Education (Foreign Language Education (English), Educational Administration, Mathematics Education, Physical Education, Counseling Psychology Education, Beauty Education, Art Therapy Education, Music Therapy Education)
- Graduate School of Aeronautics, Information and Industry (Korean-Chinese Language and Culture, Elderly Welfare, Public Administration, Business Administration, Cosmetology, Avionics, Aerospace Software Engineering, Aviation Sports)
- International Graduate School of Art & Design (Child art study, Interior Design, Architectural Design, Music, Animation, Industrial Design, Fashion Design, Cultural asset Preservation, Film & Theatre)

=== International Education Programs ===
Hanseo University exchanges students and faculty through sister relations with 58 universities in 12 countries, and around 500 foreign students study at the school. The international Red Cross Youth scholarships in particular, started in 2001 and selects young Red Cross members from Asian Pacific countries with the International Federation of Red Cross and Red Crescent Societies and the Republic of Korean National Red Cross. The scholarship provides students with a four-year scholarship to produce global talents who will spread a mind of humanitarianism and make Korea known to the world. The Institute of the Korean Language and Culture provides five stages of Korean language classes from beginner to advanced including listening, speaking and writing. It trains experts who understand Korean society and culture through hands-on education, including field trips.
