= Seosan =

City in South Chungcheong, South Korea

- Municipal City
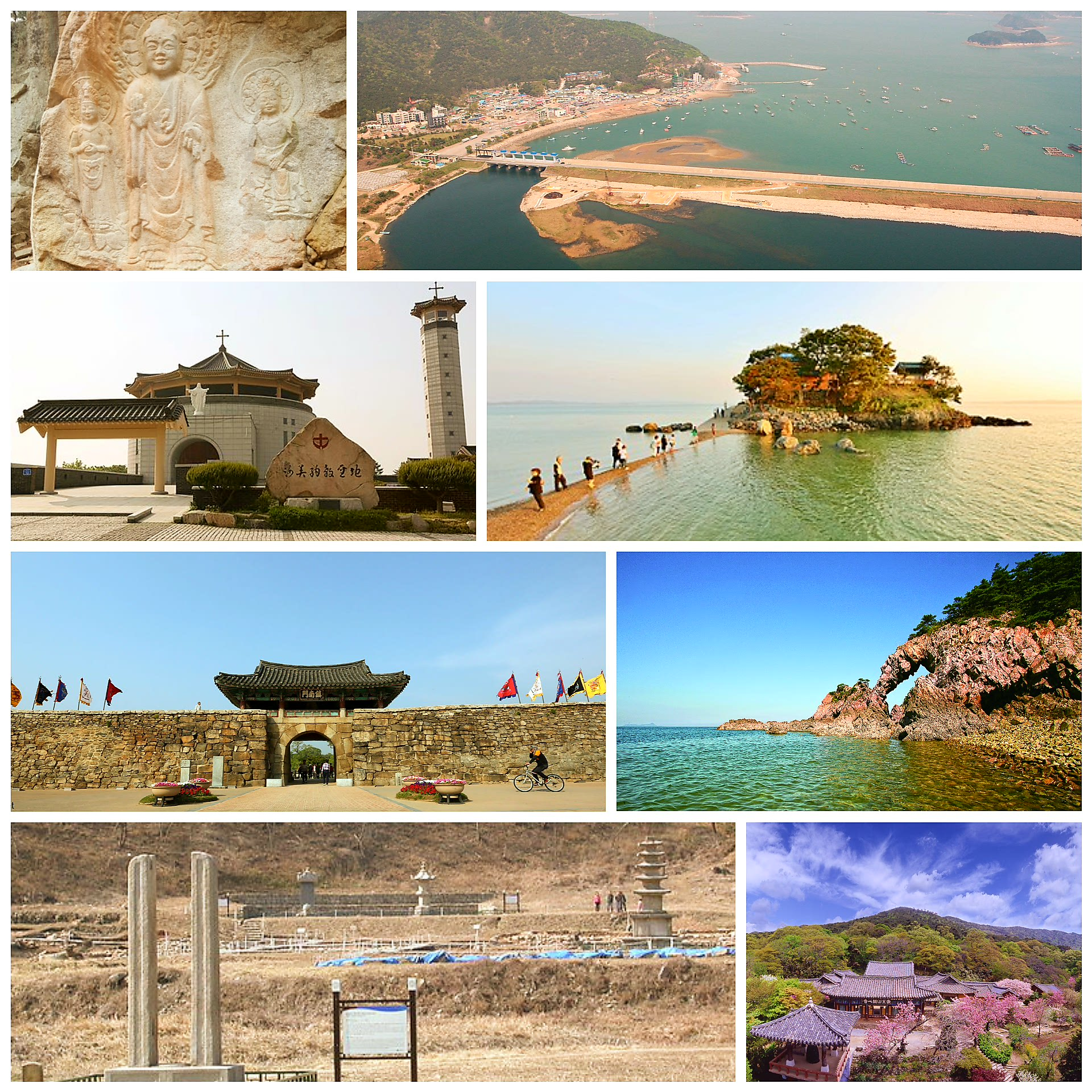
- Left: Yonghyeon-ri Rock-carved triad buddha, Haemi Martyrs Shrine, Haemee Eupseong Fortress, Bowonsal Temple Ruin, Right: Samgilbo harbour, Ganworam Hermitage, Hwangguem mountain and cave, Gaesimsa Temple (all item from above to bottom)

- Flag

- Location in South Korea
- Coordinates: 36°46′54″N 126°27′08″E
- Country: South Korea
- Region: Chungcheong
- Administrative divisions: 1 eup, 9 myeon, 5 dong

Government
  - Mayor: Lee Wan-seop (이완섭)

Area
  - Total: 742.28 km^{2} (286.60 sq mi)

Population (September 2024)
  - Total: 175,144
  - Dialect: Chungcheong
- Time zone: UTC+9 (Korea Standard Time)
- City Bird: Baikal Teal and Black-Winged Stilt
- City Flower: Chrysanthemum
- City Tree: Pine tree
- Website: www.seosan.go.kr

Korean name
- Hangul: 서산시
- Hanja: 瑞山市
- RR: Seosan-si
- MR: Sŏsan-si

Seosan (Korean: 서산; Korean pronunciation: [sʰʌ.san]) is a city in South Chungcheong Province, South Korea, with a population of roughly 175,000 according to the 2017 census. Located at the northwestern end of South Chungcheong Province, it is bounded by Dangjin, Naepo New Town, Yesan-gun and Hongseong-gun on the east, Taean-gun and the Yellow Sea on the west, 125 km (78 mi) south of Seoul, 159 km (99 mi) northwest of Daejeon and 34 km (21 mi) northwest of Naepo New Town. Seosan is the hub of transportation on the west coast where the Seohaean Expressway, Daejeon-Dangjin Expressway, and National Highways No. 29, 32, 38, and 45 intersect.

== Culture and tourism ==
Although Seosan itself is fairly quiet and attracts relatively few tourists, there are a number of minor attractions in the rural areas outside of Seosan, most of which can be accessed within twenty minutes by car, or in an hour by bicycle. Many of these historic sites are well-known only among the locals and often have few visitors, which can make them appealing to those wishing to escape the crowded palaces and temples of Korea's major cities. For an exhaustive list of tourist attractions in the Seosan-Haemi area, detailed English-language maps are available at the Seosan Intercity Bus Terminal.

=== Haemieupseong Fortress ===
Located in Haemi-eup, approximately 12 km (7.5 mi) from Seosan (15 minutes by car or local bus; 45 minutes by bike), Haemieupseong Fortress (해미읍성) is among the best-preserved examples of Korea's Joseon-era fortress architecture, and unlike most Joseon-era fortifications, it was built on a flat plain rather than on a hill or mountain. Haemieupseong Fortress was completed in 1491 (the 22nd year of King Seongjong's reign) and surrounded the entirety of Haemi-eup at the time of its completion. The fortress was used as a military command post controlling the Chuncheong-do region and provided defense against Japanese pirates along Korea's western coast. As the town of Haemi expanded in the early 20th century, much of the fortress was torn down to allow additional urban development, but a major restoration work was undertaken in 1973. Today, the South Gate of Haemieupseong Fortress is original, along with certain parts of the walls, while the other gates are reconstructions. Along with Yeosutgol, Haemieupseong Fortress is considered to be a Holy Ground among Korean Catholics due to the Byeongin Persecutions of 1866, during which many Catholics living in the Chuncheong area were killed at the fortress.

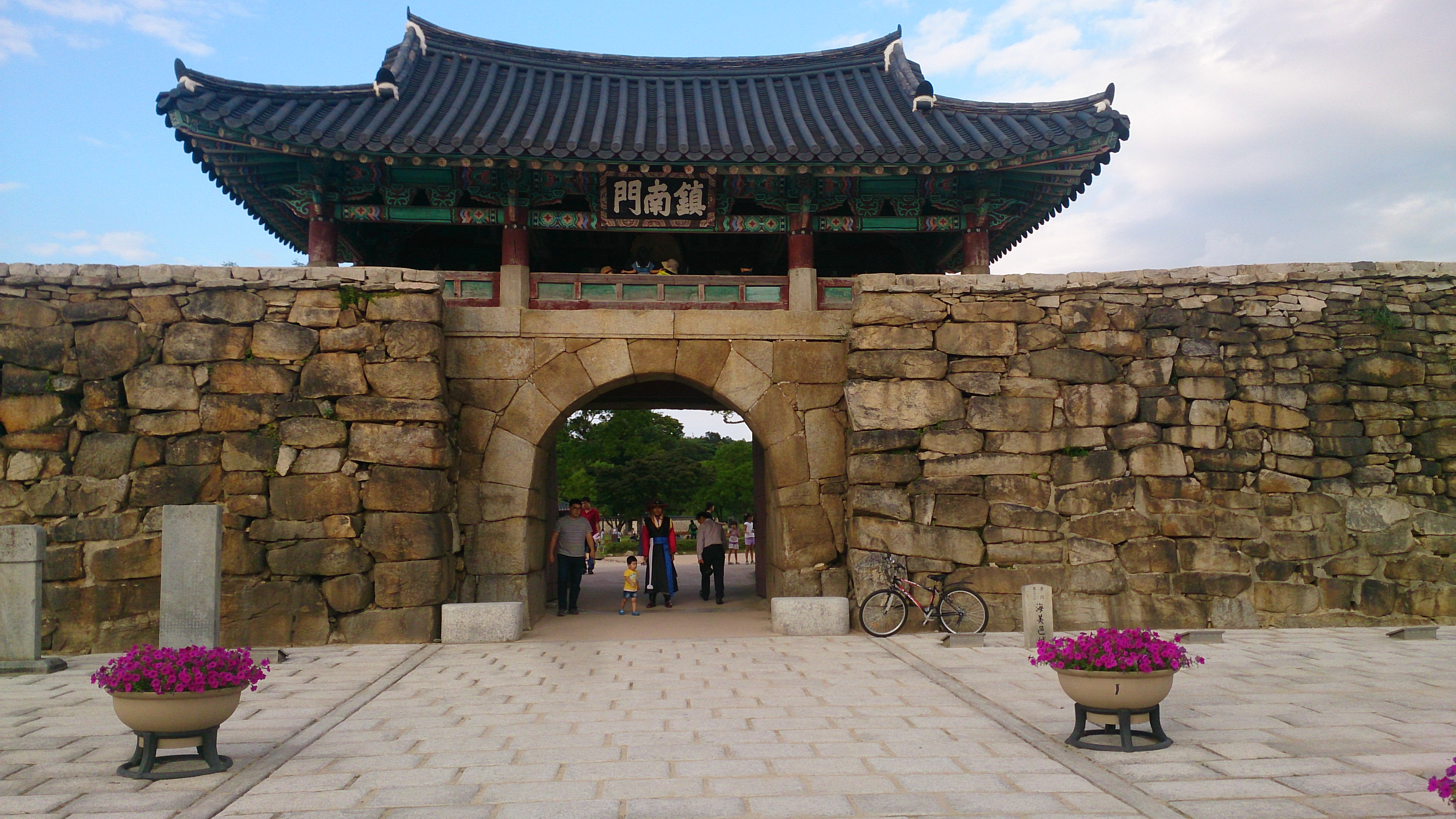
Haemieupseong Fortress Main Gate

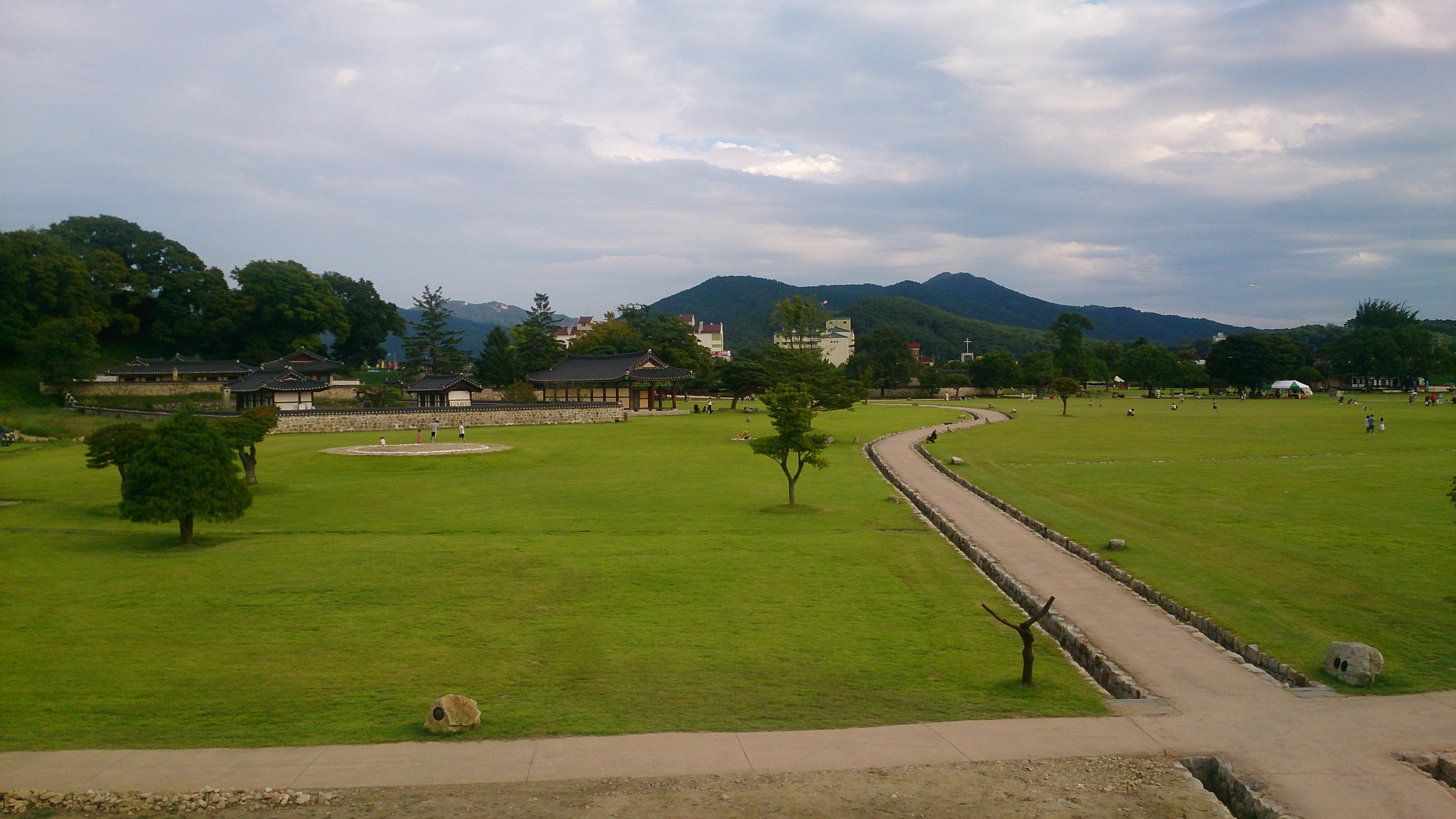
Haemieupseong Fortress Interior

=== Yeosutgol Holy Ground ===
Approximately two hundred metres (660 ft) from Haemieupseong Fortress is the Yeosutgol Holy Ground (해미순교성지), where Korean Catholics were buried alive, drowned and otherwise killed en masse during the Byeongin Persecutions. Although most of the site's remains were washed away by flooding, some of them were rediscovered in 1935. The site now contains a large memorial hall devoted to those who were martyred for their faith and is now a major Catholic pilgrimage site.

=== Yeonghyeon-ri Rock-carved Buddha Triad ===
During the Three Kingdoms period (c. 57 BCE – 668 CE), the Seosan-Haemi area was under the control of Baekje, and although there are very few ruins from this period in the Seosan-Haemi area, the Yeonghyeon-ri Rock-carved Buddha triad (용현리 마애여래삼존상) is an exception. Carved in either the late 6th or early 7th century CE, the carving consists of a Buddha standing on a lotus leaf, flanked by two bodhisattva. Although this carving has been designated a National Treasure of Korea, it receives relatively few visitors due to its isolation. The carving is best viewed in the morning, when the entirety of the triad is illuminated by the rising sun, and is accessible by local buses from Seosan and Unsan-ri, or by a half-hour drive or ninety-minute bike ride directly from Seosan.

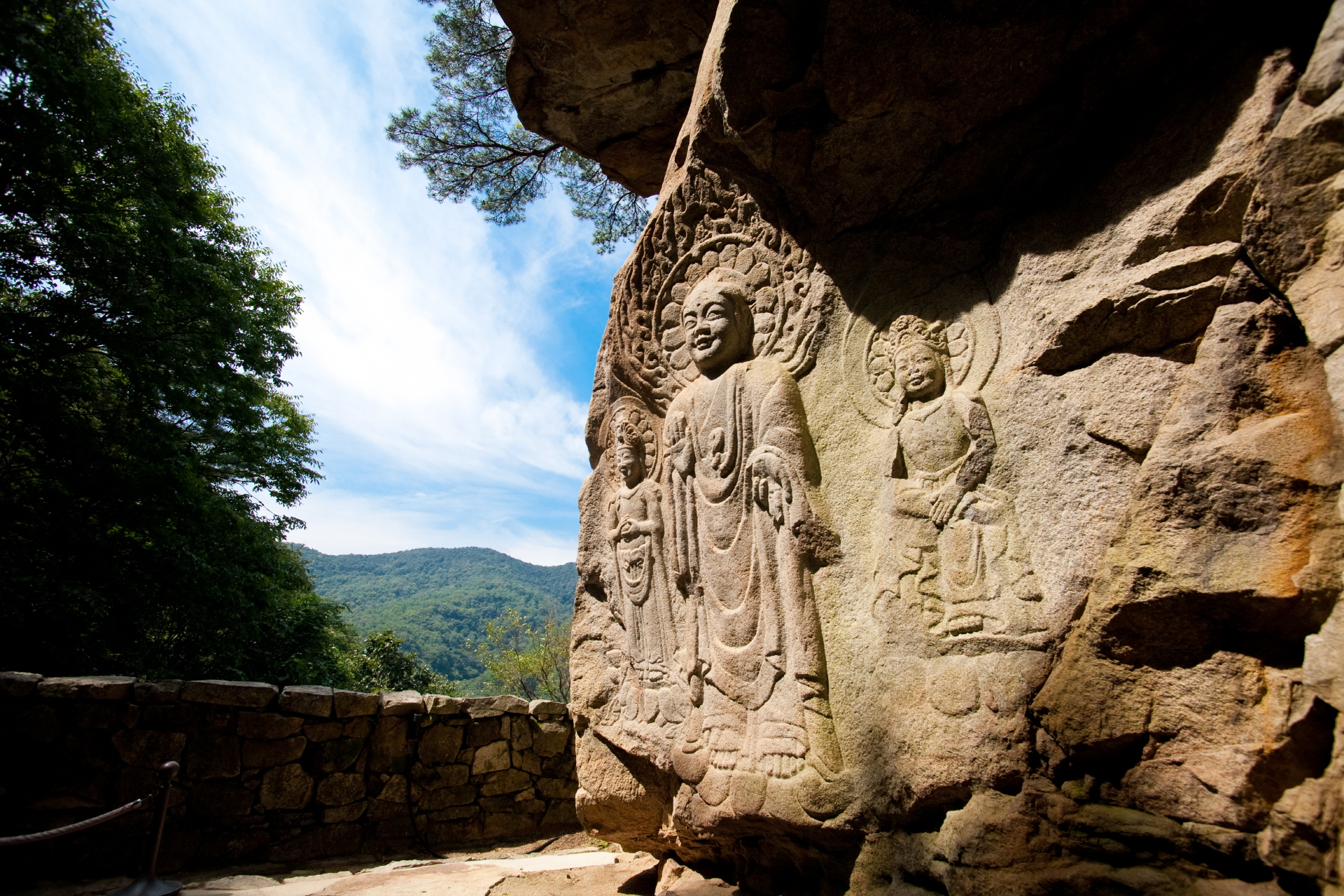
Yonghyeon-ri Rock-carved Buddha Triad

=== Bowonsa ===
Built during the Unified Silla period (668 – 935 CE), Bowonsa (보원사지) is a small temple containing an iconic Baekje-style pagoda, as well as a number of monuments which were added when the temple was expanded during the Goryeo period (918 – 1392 CE) and is considered to be a National Treasure of Korea. Bowonsa is about 500 meters from the Yeonghyeon-ri Rock-carved Buddha Triad and is a quiet place for relaxation and meditation.

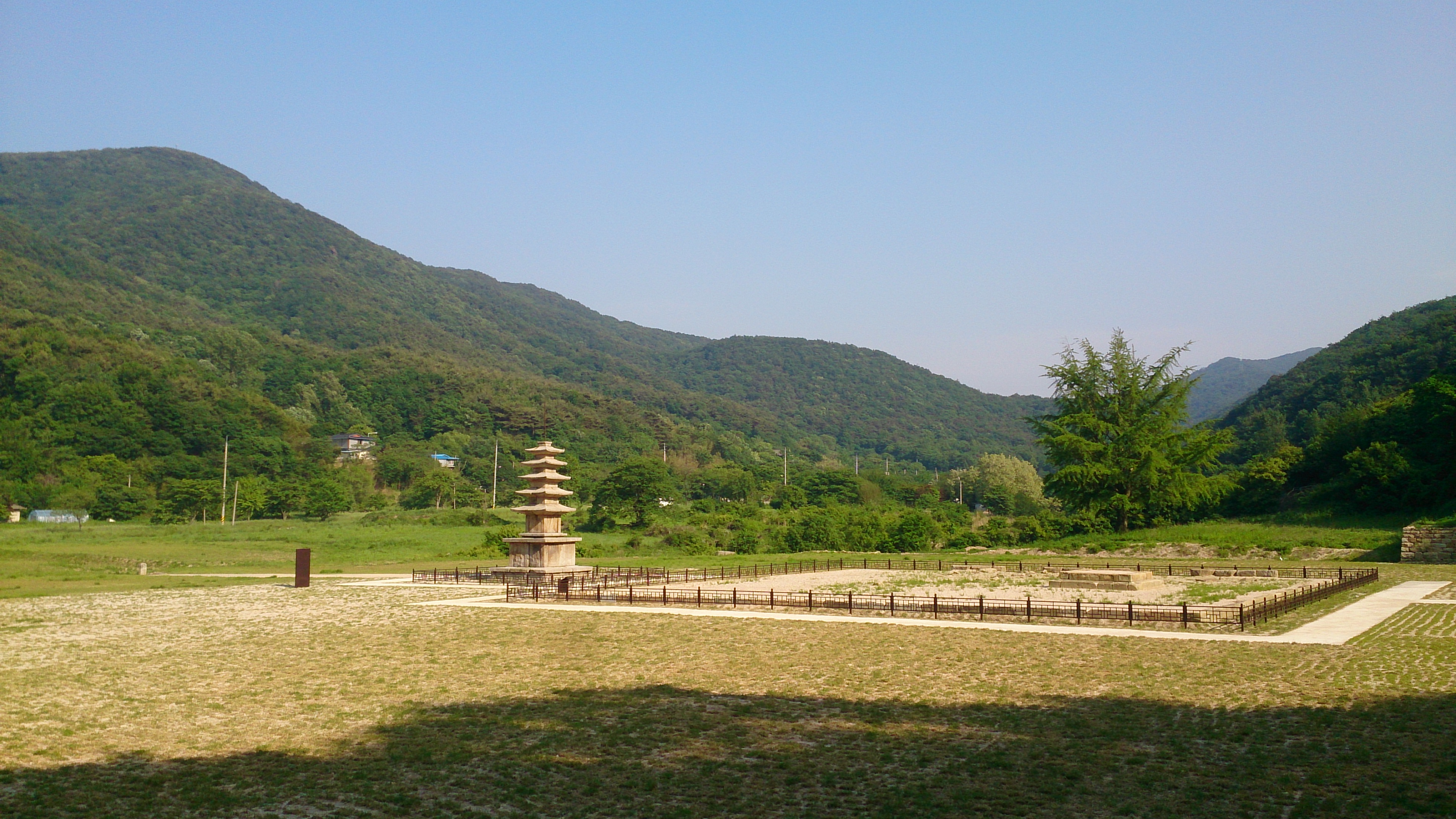
Bowonsa

=== Gaesimsa ===
Built in 1484 (the 15th year of King Seongjong's reign), Gaesimsa (개심사) is one of only a handful of wooden buildings in Korea which date past the 17th century. The temple houses an Amitabha Buddha statue carved in the 14th century, as well as a hanging mural painted in the 15th century, both of which have won Gaesimsa the title of National Treasure of Korea. At the temple's rear is a mountain path which links to the Aramegil Hiking Trails, and can be used to reach Bowonsa and Yeonghyeon-ri on foot within a 90–120-minute hike.

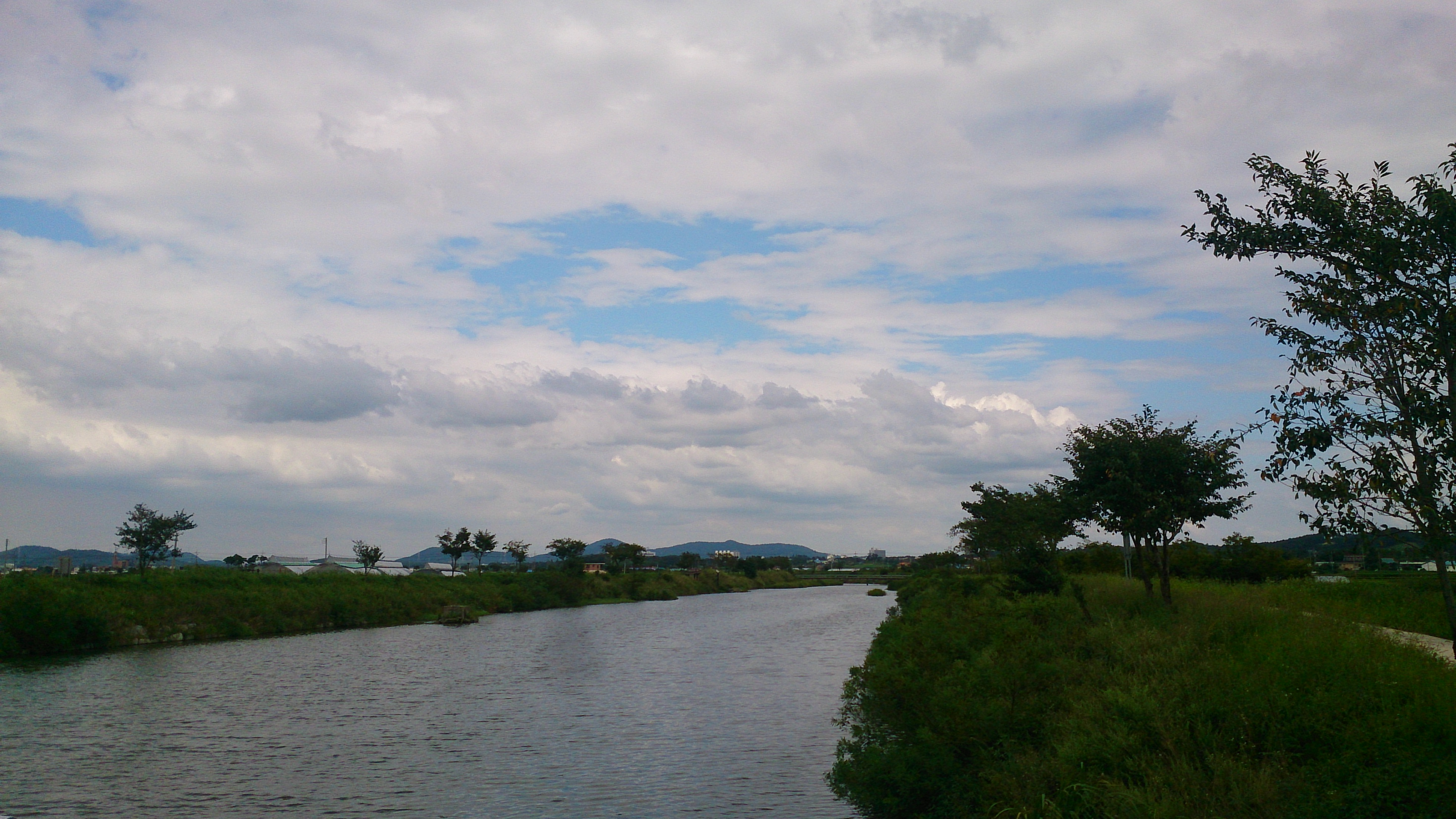
Seosan Countryside

== Climate ==
As with most of South Korea, Seosan has a humid subtropical climate/humid continental climate (Cfa/Dfa). In spring, mild temperatures are accompanied by strong winds bearing dust from China. This unpleasant dust is named hwangsa (황사) or Asian Dust and prompts many Seosanites to wear face masks when walking or cycling. Seosan and the surrounding area are quite beautiful in Spring, however, particularly in the mountains and in Seosan's Lake Park. In summer, the monsoon season lasts about three weeks in June or July and is characterized by very strong winds and heavy rainfall, although the severity of both of these phenomena has been decreasing in recent years. Seosan may be affected by mild typhoons during the summer season, as was the case in 2010, when Seosan was damaged by Typhoon Kompasu. Fall typically begins in mid-September and temperatures begin to drop rapidly by November. Snow generally appears in late November or early December, and continues until late February or early March. With the exception of occasional snow storms, snowfall is generally very mild and rarely causes inconveniences for local traffic. The average temperature in Seosan is 11.8 °C (53.2 °F).

Climate data for Seosan (1991–2020 normals, extremes 1968–present)
| Month | Jan | Feb | Mar | Apr | May | Jun | Jul | Aug | Sep | Oct | Nov | Dec | Year |
|---|---|---|---|---|---|---|---|---|---|---|---|---|---|
| Record high °C (°F) | 17.7 (63.9) | 19.3 (66.7) | 24.3 (75.7) | 29.8 (85.6) | 31.4 (88.5) | 33.7 (92.7) | 37.3 (99.1) | 37.1 (98.8) | 34.4 (93.9) | 30.7 (87.3) | 25.4 (77.7) | 18.9 (66.0) | 37.3 (99.1) |
| Mean daily maximum °C (°F) | 3.3 (37.9) | 5.6 (42.1) | 10.8 (51.4) | 17.3 (63.1) | 22.5 (72.5) | 26.4 (79.5) | 28.5 (83.3) | 29.7 (85.5) | 26.1 (79.0) | 20.5 (68.9) | 13.0 (55.4) | 5.7 (42.3) | 17.5 (63.5) |
| Daily mean °C (°F) | −1.6 (29.1) | 0.1 (32.2) | 4.9 (40.8) | 10.9 (51.6) | 16.6 (61.9) | 21.3 (70.3) | 24.5 (76.1) | 25.3 (77.5) | 20.7 (69.3) | 14.1 (57.4) | 7.4 (45.3) | 0.8 (33.4) | 12.1 (53.8) |
| Mean daily minimum °C (°F) | −6.2 (20.8) | −4.9 (23.2) | −0.7 (30.7) | 5.0 (41.0) | 11.4 (52.5) | 17.0 (62.6) | 21.5 (70.7) | 21.7 (71.1) | 16.1 (61.0) | 8.6 (47.5) | 2.2 (36.0) | −3.7 (25.3) | 7.3 (45.1) |
| Record low °C (°F) | −19.7 (−3.5) | −17.1 (1.2) | −9.8 (14.4) | −4.7 (23.5) | 2.1 (35.8) | 8.0 (46.4) | 13.7 (56.7) | 13.7 (56.7) | 4.1 (39.4) | −1.9 (28.6) | −8.2 (17.2) | −15.9 (3.4) | −19.7 (−3.5) |
| Average precipitation mm (inches) | 23.5 (0.93) | 31.1 (1.22) | 41.5 (1.63) | 74.7 (2.94) | 101.1 (3.98) | 138.2 (5.44) | 274.6 (10.81) | 283.5 (11.16) | 144.4 (5.69) | 53.0 (2.09) | 54.1 (2.13) | 34.2 (1.35) | 1,253.9 (49.37) |
| Average precipitation days (≥ 0.1 mm) | 8.6 | 6.6 | 6.6 | 7.8 | 8.0 | 9.3 | 14.8 | 13.8 | 8.1 | 6.3 | 9.7 | 11.5 | 111.1 |
| Average snowy days | 11.2 | 6.2 | 2.7 | 0.0 | 0.0 | 0.0 | 0.0 | 0.0 | 0.0 | 0.0 | 2.7 | 9.0 | 31.8 |
| Average relative humidity (%) | 70.7 | 68.2 | 67.5 | 67.4 | 71.5 | 76.5 | 84.2 | 82.4 | 78.1 | 74.1 | 73.4 | 72.0 | 73.8 |
| Mean monthly sunshine hours | 157.2 | 173.5 | 208.1 | 219.5 | 238.8 | 195.4 | 146.7 | 183.1 | 190.8 | 208.1 | 155.7 | 147.9 | 2,224.8 |
| Percentage possible sunshine | 49.2 | 55.2 | 54.5 | 55.8 | 53.4 | 44.0 | 32.2 | 43.7 | 50.7 | 58.2 | 48.3 | 47.0 | 48.9 |
Source: Korea Meteorological Administration (snow and percent sunshine 1981–2010)

== Education ==
Hanseo University (한서대학교), a private university established in 1992, has 8,500 students and 50 departments that are staffed by 250 full-time faculty members. It is located about 5 km (3.1 mi) south-east of Haemi-eup and can be reached in 15 minutes by a local bus from Haemi. The university provides courses in Chiropractic, a wide range of liberal arts, design, and engineering disciplines, and hosts aviation and flight-training schools.

== Cityscape ==
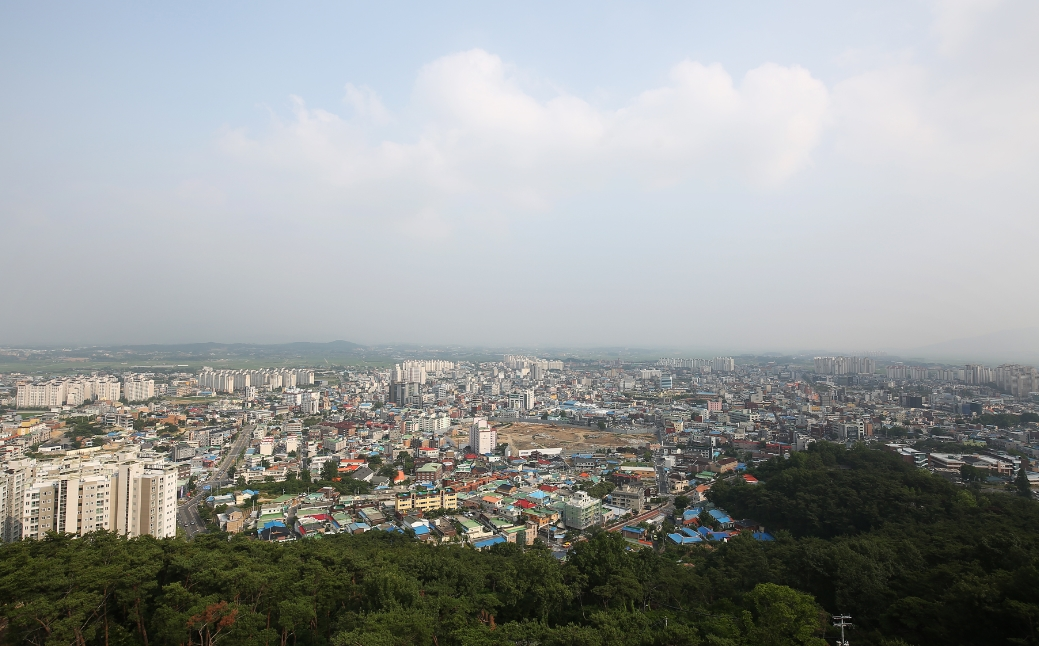
The panoramic view of Seosan from Seosan Tower

== Transportation ==
Seosan is served by Express and Intercity buses. Under optimal conditions, Express buses can reach Seoul's Gangnam Terminal in approximately 90 minutes, but can take up to 2.5 hours in the event of heavy traffic. Express buses to Seoul's Gangnam Terminal depart every half-hour, while intercity buses to other locations depart every hour.

Seosan does not have a railway station; the nearest station is Hongseong Station, on the Janghang Line, approximately 40 km (25 mi) south of Seosan.

A number of local buses serve the Seosan-Haemi area, with a fare between 960 and 1450 won.

== Sport ==
Seosan Baseball Stadium, the second team stadium of the Hanwha Eagles, has been built in Seosan Techno Valley, allowing the people of Seosan to enjoy professional baseball. The distance from Daejeon to Seosan is 1 hour and 30 minutes, but it is a welcome addition for the second team players who have been training without a second team stadium.

Previously, there was a national league football club, Seosan Citizens, founded in 2002, but it was disbanded in the 2008 budget and replaced by Seosan FC, an amateur football club founded in 1981.

== Notable people from Seosan ==
- Rain (born Jung Ji-hoon; June 25, 1982), singer and actor
- Byul (born Kim Go-eun; October 22, 1983), singer
- Kim Kiri (김기리) (born November 27, 1985), comedian
- Lee Woo-seok (born August 7, 1997) the archer
- Son woong-jung (born June 16, 1962) Football player. Father of Son heung-min who is Korean football player.
- Park kyu-hyun (born April 4, 2001) Football player.

== Local Specialties ==
Seosan is renowned for its locally farmed oysters and garlic, as well as a number of specialty dishes including gegukji (게국지), a sweet and spicy broth made with crab meat and kimchi, and marinated blue crab with soybean sauce (꽃게장).

== Related cities ==
=== Related cities ===
- Tenri, Nara, Japan
- Takko, Aomori, Japan
- Rongcheng, Shandong, China

=== Friendship cooperation cities ===
- Hefei, Anhui, China

== See also ==
- South Chungcheong Province
- Geography of South Korea
- List of cities in South Korea
- Plan for Tidal Power Plant in Garorim Bay
- Sim Soo-bong (singer and songwriter from Seosan, known in particular by hit "One million of scarlet roses" (백만송이 장미))
