= General chemistry =

Introductory chemistry class taught at many universities

General chemistry (sometimes referred to as "gen chem") is offered by colleges and universities as an introductory level chemistry course usually taken by students during their first year. The course is usually run with a concurrent lab section that gives students an opportunity to experience a laboratory environment and carry out experiments with the material learned in the course. These labs can consist of acid-base titrations, kinetics, equilibrium reactions, and electrochemical reactions. Chemistry majors as well as students across STEM majors such as biology, biochemistry, biomedicine, physics, and engineering are usually required to complete one year of general chemistry as well.

== Concepts taught ==
The concepts taught in a typical general chemistry course are as follows:

- Stoichiometry
- Conservation of energy
- Conservation of mass
- Elementary atomic theory
- Periodic table and periodicity
- Law of constant composition
- Gas laws
- Nuclear chemistry
- Solubility
- Acid-base chemistry
- Chemical bonding
- Chemical kinetics
- Thermodynamics
- Electrochemistry
- Chemical equilibria

== Pre-medical track ==
Students in colleges and universities looking to follow the "pre-medical" track are required to pass general chemistry as the Association of American Medical Colleges requires at least one full year of chemistry. In order for students to apply to medical school, they must pass the medical college admission test, or MCAT, which consists of a section covering the foundations of general chemistry. General chemistry covers many of the principal foundations that apply to medicine and the human body that is essential in our current understanding and practice of medicine.

=== Topics of general chemistry covered by the AAMC Medical College Admissions Test ===
- Acids and bases
- Atomic structure
- Bonding and chemical interactions
- Chemical kinetics
- Electrochemistry
- Equilibrium
- Solutions
- Stoichiometry
- The gas phase
- Thermochemistry
- Redox reactions

== Student Experience ==
Students who are enrolled in general chemistry often aspire to become doctors, researchers, engineers and educators. In a general chemistry course, students must recall chemical concepts, apply algebraic skills, and use scientific reasoning to solve multi-step problems. Because the class is rigorous, it gained the titled of a "weed-out" class, in which students drop or withdraw from the course due to its level of difficulty.

=== Previous chemistry knowledge ===
Students can have different perceptions of the course based on their experiences, or lack thereof, in high school chemistry courses. A 2015 study found that prior chemistry knowledge and students' ability to apply scientific reasoning were significantly correlated with better performance on the ACS First Term General Chemistry Exam, a standardized multiple-choice test that evaluates general chemistry knowledge.

=== Disparities ===
Female, first-generation, low income, or racial/ethnic minority students are more likely to drop or withdraw from general chemistry or not finish their degree at all. Research on racial disparities in STEM education has identified factors such as unequal access to educational resources, stereotype threat, and differences in students' sense of belongingness as possible contributors to disparities in academic outcomes.

=== Efforts to improve representation ===
Chemical education research has examined approaches to reducing disparities and improving student outcomes in STEM courses. In a first-year general chemistry course at the University of California, Davis, low-income, first-generation, and underrepresented students participated in a program providing academic, social, and emotional support. Students who participated in the program performed somewhat better in general chemistry than students who did not participate. Psychological interventions have also been studied in STEM courses, with some research reporting improvements in students' social networks and persistence in STEM courses.
