= Veterinary acupuncture =

Traditional Chinese medicine

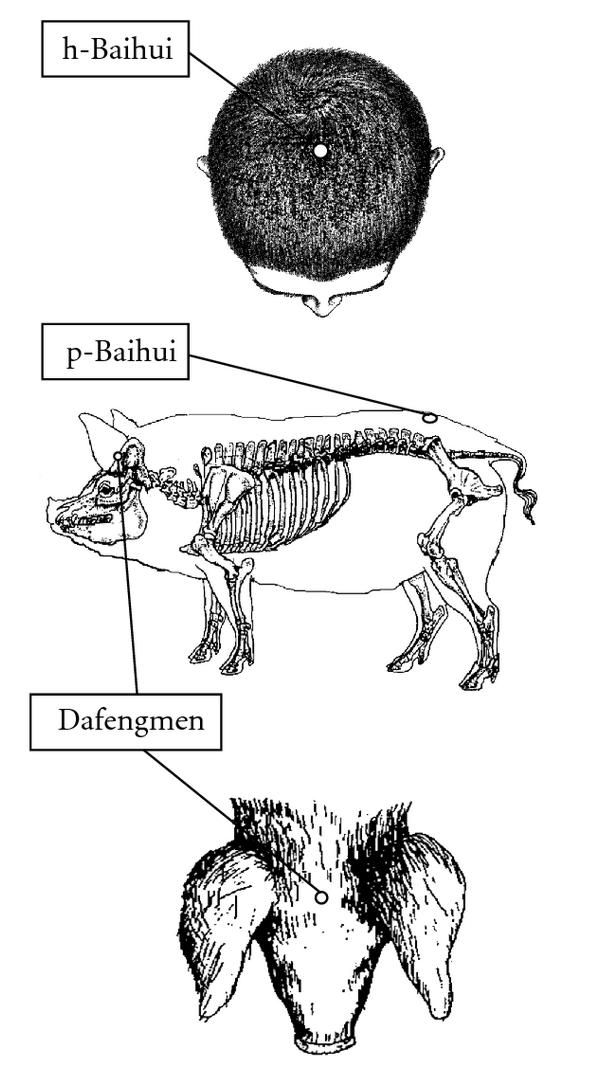
According to traditional Chinese medicine, the Baihui acupuncture point in humans, which is the midpoint of a line connecting both ears, is anatomically similar to the Dafengmen point in pigs

Veterinary acupuncture is a form of traditional Chinese medicine and a pseudoscientific practice of performing acupuncture on animals. The best studies of the effects of animal acupuncture have produced consistently negative results.

== History ==
Traditional Chinese veterinary medicine (TCVM) has been practiced on animals for thousands of years. For nearly 3,000 years, from the Zhou dynasty and the reign of Emperor Mu around 930 BCE. Up until the Yuan dynasty of the 14th century, Chinese medicine was used sparingly on large animals. Much of the focus was on the treatment of horses since they were so essential to the military. In more modern times it has been used increasingly on pet animals. Acupuncture is one of the five branches of TCVM.

In historical Asian culture, people known as "horse priests" commonly used acupuncture. The flow of information from the East to the West regarding animal treatment, including acupuncture, is thought to have started from Mesopotamia around 300 BC. Acupuncture remained a major interest in veterinary medicine for centuries. Its use for dogs was first described in the Tang dynasty.

In the 20th century, animal acupuncture was first introduced in the United States in 1971 by two acupuncturists of the National Acupuncture Association, Gene Bruno and John Ottaviano. In the process of treating thousands of small animals and several hundred horses, Bruno and Ottaviano trained veterinarians who later founded the International Veterinary Acupuncture Society (IVAS). The demand for veterinary acupuncture has steadily increased since the 1990s. Acupuncture charts devised for animals reflect a transposing of human charts onto animals, which, as Ramey noted, is one reason why horses have a "gall bladder" meridian, even though they don't have a gall bladder. In the context of that observation, Ramey concludes that "when it comes to animal acupuncture, there's apparently no absurdity sufficiently large to cause practitioners any embarrassment."

== Practice ==
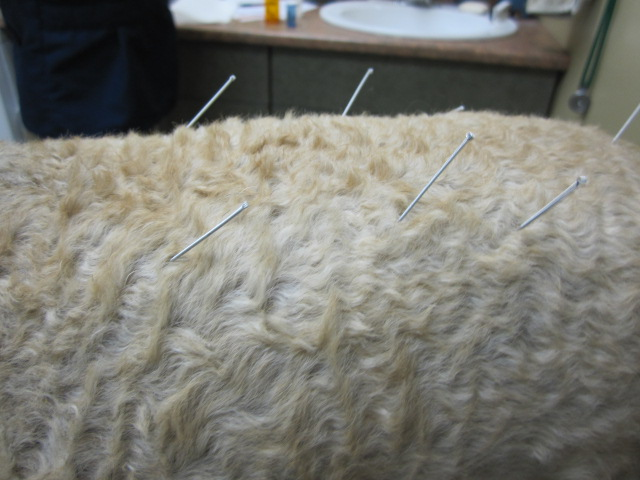
Veterinary acupuncture in dog

Acupuncture is used mainly for functional problems such as those involving noninfectious inflammation, paralysis, or pain. For small animals, acupuncture has been used for treating arthritis, hip dysplasia, lick granuloma, feline asthma, diarrhea, and certain reproductive problems. For larger animals, acupuncture has been used for treating downer cow syndrome, facial nerve paralysis, allergic dermatitis, respiratory problems, nonsurgical colic, and certain reproductive disorders.

Acupuncture has also been used on competitive animals. There are veterinarians who use acupuncture along with herbs to treat muscle injuries in dogs and cats. Veterinarians charge around $85 for each acupuncture session.

Veterinary acupuncture has also recently been used on more exotic animals, such as chimpanzees (Pan troglodytes) and an alligator with scoliosis, though this is still quite rare.

== Efficacy ==
In 2001, a review found insufficient evidence to support equine acupuncture. The review found uniformly negative results in the highest quality studies. In 2006, a systematic review of veterinary acupuncture found "no compelling evidence to recommend or reject acupuncture for any condition in domestic animals", citing trials with, on average, low methodological quality or trials that are in need of independent replication. In 2009, a review on canine arthritis found "weak or no evidence in support of" various treatments, including acupuncture.

David Gorski has said that muscle injuries tend to heal eventually and there is no way to determine if acupuncture had any contribution in the recovery. He said, "For instance, the natural history of most muscle injuries is to heal. They might heal with scarring, so that function is never the same. They might heal and leave the victim with chronic pain. But they do eventually heal."

== Related methods ==
Acupuncture refers to the use of dry needles; however, there are several related methods which do not use these, or may use a modified type of needle or stimulator.

- Electroacupuncture: Electrical stimulation at an acupuncture point. This may by given on or through the surface of the skin. Various combinations of acupuncture points can be selected to induce electropuncture analgesia in animals. Generally, analgesia is achieved near to the sites of electropuncture.

A study on the use of electroacupuncture on dogs after back surgery reported ambiguous results. In the study, the post-operation dogs were assigned a pain score eight times within a 72-hour time-frame. Though significantly lower pain scores were found in the treatment group at 36 hours, the scores did not differ from the control group at any other time.

- Aquapuncture: Injection of a drug or a liquid (e.g. vitamin B12) at acupuncture points.
- Acupressure: Application of pressure at acupuncture points.
- Moxibustion: Using a burning herbal stick to stimulate and warm acupuncture points.
- Lasers: Lasers can sometimes be used to stimulate acupuncture points.
- Implantation: Gold or silver beads (or other stimulants) are sometimes implanted at acupuncture points.

== Organizations ==
The International Veterinary Acupuncture Society (IVAS) was founded in the US in 1974 and the first certification exam was held in 1975 when there were only 80 members of the society. IVAS has grown worldwide and in 2015 the membership exceeds 1,800. The Association of British Veterinary Acupuncturists was formed in 1987. In 2014, American Veterinary Medical Association (AVMA) admitted the American Academy of Veterinary Acupuncture (AAVA) as a "Constituent Allied Veterinary Organization". The American Board of Animal Acupuncture (ABAA) is the only certification agency for licensed acupuncturists (who are not also licensed veterinarians) practicing animal acupuncture in the US. The ability for a non-veterinarian to practice animal acupuncture varies from state to state. Most states consider acupuncture treatment to be practicing veterinary medicine and you must be a licensed veterinarian to do so. Therefore, veterinarians will be certified by IVAS, Curacore, or Chi.
