= Councils on Chiropractic Education International =

Health education organization

- Abbreviation: CCEI
- Formation: 2001
- Location: Toronto, Canada
- President: Dr. Cynthia Peterson Europe
- Website: www.cceintl.org

The Councils on Chiropractic Education International (CCEI) is an organization of chiropractic accrediting bodies worldwide. Organized in Brussels during 2001, the CCEI maintains its International Chiropractic Accreditation Standards, and aids in the development and recognition of new accrediting bodies in geographic regions where such agencies are not currently recognized.

CCEI provides accreditation services through its assigned member organizations to chiropractic educational entities situated in areas not currently served by a CCEI member agency. Accreditation agency actions and status designations for chiropractic educational entities that award equivalent degrees are mutually endorsed on the basis of membership in CCEI.

== Membership ==
Membership in CCEI is open to agencies organized to accredit chiropractic education that meet all requirements for CCEI recognition and are committed to ongoing compliance with the responsibilities of membership as stated in the CCEI Articles and Bylaws.

- Council on Chiropractic Education Australasia (CCEA)
- Council on Chiropractic Education Canada (CCEC)
- European Council On Chiropractic Education (ECCE)
