= 1895 =

1895 in various calendars
- Gregorian calendar: 1895; MDCCCXCV
- Ab urbe condita: 2648
- Armenian calendar: 1344; ԹՎ ՌՅԽԴ
- Assyrian calendar: 6645
- Baháʼí calendar: 51–52
- Balinese saka calendar: 1816–1817
- Bengali calendar: 1301–1302
- Berber calendar: 2845
- British Regnal year: 58 Vict. 1 – 59 Vict. 1
- Buddhist calendar: 2439
- Burmese calendar: 1257
- Byzantine calendar: 7403–7404
- Chinese calendar: 甲午年 (Wood Horse); 4592 or 4385 — to — 乙未年 (Wood Goat); 4593 or 4386
- Coptic calendar: 1611–1612
- Discordian calendar: 3061
- Ethiopian calendar: 1887–1888
- Hebrew calendar: 5655–5656
- Hindu calendars
- Vikram Samvat: 1951–1952
- Shaka Samvat: 1816–1817
- Kali Yuga: 4995–4996
- Holocene calendar: 11895
- Igbo calendar: 895–896
- Iranian calendar: 1273–1274
- Islamic calendar: 1312–1313
- Japanese calendar: Meiji 28 (明治２８年)
- Javanese calendar: 1824–1825
- Julian calendar: Gregorian minus 12 days
- Korean calendar: 4228
- Minguo calendar: 17 before ROC 民前17年
- Nanakshahi calendar: 427
- Thai solar calendar: 2437–2438
- Tibetan calendar: ཤིང་ཕོ་རྟ་ལོ་ (male Wood-Horse); 2021 or 1640 or 868 — to — ཤིང་མོ་ལུག་ལོ་ (female Wood-Sheep); 2022 or 1641 or 869

1895 (MDCCCXCV) was a common year starting on Tuesday of the Gregorian calendar and a common year starting on Sunday of the Julian calendar, the 1895th year of the Common Era (CE) and Anno Domini (AD) designations, the 895th year of the 2nd millennium, the 95th year of the 19th century, and the 6th year of the 1890s decade. As of the start of 1895, the Gregorian calendar was 12 days ahead of the Julian calendar, which remained in localized use until 1923.

== Events ==
=== January ===
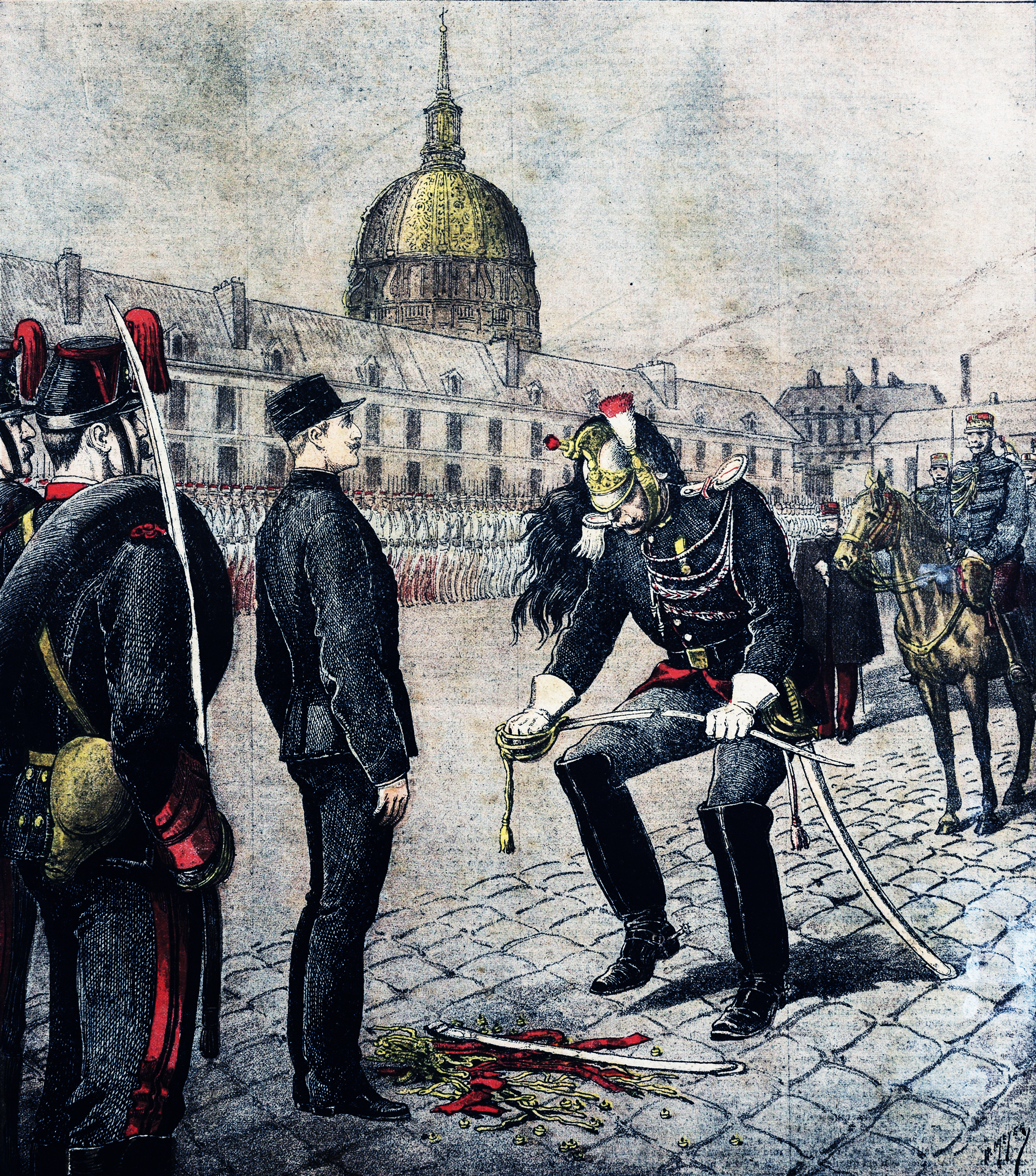
January 5: Dreyfus affair

- January 5 – Dreyfus affair: French officer Alfred Dreyfus is stripped of his army rank and sentenced to life imprisonment on Devil's Island (off French Guiana) on what is much later admitted to be a false charge of treason.
- January 6 – The Wilcox rebellion, an attempt led by Robert Wilcox to overthrow the Republic of Hawaii and restore the Kingdom of Hawaii, begins with royalist troops landing at Waikiki Beach in O'ahu and clashing with republican defenders. The rebellion ends after three days and the remaining 190 royalists are taken prisoners of war.
- January 12 – Britain's National Trust for Places of Historic Interest or Natural Beauty is founded by Octavia Hill, Robert Hunter and Canon Hardwicke Rawnsley.
- January 13 – First Italo-Ethiopian War: Battle of Coatit – Italian forces defeat the Ethiopians.
- January 15 – A warehouse fire and dynamite explosion kills 57 people, including 13 firefighters in Butte, Montana in the U.S.
- January 17 – A 6.8 magnitude earthquake strikes northeastern Iran near the town of Quchan and causes at least 1,000 deaths.
- January 21 –
  - The U.S. Supreme Court rules in United States v. E. C. Knight Co. that Congress and the U.S. federal government cannot regulate manufacturing, and dismisses an antitrust lawsuit against American Sugar Refining Company, which controls 98 percent of sugar refining in the United States.
  - The American steamer S.S. Chicora sinks in a storm on Lake Michigan, along with all 21 of its crew and a lone passenger.
- January 24 – An effort to restore the Hawaiian monarchy ends as the former Queen Liliʻuokalani abdicates and pledges allegiance to the Republic of Hawaii.
- January 31 – The sinking of the German ocean liner SS Elbe kills 334 people on board, 20 minutes after the ship had collided with the British steamer SS Crathie in the North Sea. Only two lifeboats are able to evacuate before the Elbe goes down, and the first lifeboat capsizes when too many passengers attempt to get onboard. A second lifeboat, with 15 members of the crew, four men and a woman, carries the only survivors.

=== February ===
- February 20
  - The gold reserve of the U.S. Treasury is saved when J. P. Morgan and the Rothschilds loan $65 million worth of gold to the United States government. The offering of syndicate bonds sells out only 22 minutes after the New York market opens, and just two hours after going on sale in London.
  - Venezuelan crisis of 1895: U.S. President Grover Cleveland signs into law a bill resulting from the proposition of House Resolution 252, by William Lindsay Scruggs and Congressman Leonidas Livingston, to the third session of the 53rd Congress of the United States of America. The bill recommends that Venezuela and Great Britain settle their dispute by arbitration.
- February 24 – The first rebellions of the Cuban War of Independence break out.

=== March ===
- March 3 – In Munich, Germany, bicyclists have to pass a test and display license plates.
- March 4 – Japanese troops capture Liaoyang and land in Taiwan.
- March 15
  - Bridget Cleary is killed and her body burned in County Tipperary, Ireland, by her husband, Michael; he is subsequently convicted and imprisoned for manslaughter, his defence being a belief that he had killed a changeling left in his wife's place after she had been abducted by fairies.
  - Heian Shrine is completed in Kyoto, Japan.
- March 18 – The world's first gasoline bus route is started in Germany, between Siegen and Netphen.
- March 22 – Brothers Auguste and Louis Lumière make what is probably the first presentation of a projected celluloid film moving picture, the 46-second Workers Leaving the Lumière Factory, to members of the Société d'encouragement pour l'industrie nationale in Paris.
- March 30 – Rudolf Diesel patents the Diesel engine in Germany.

March 18: The first internal combustion bus, (Siegen to Netphen in Germany)

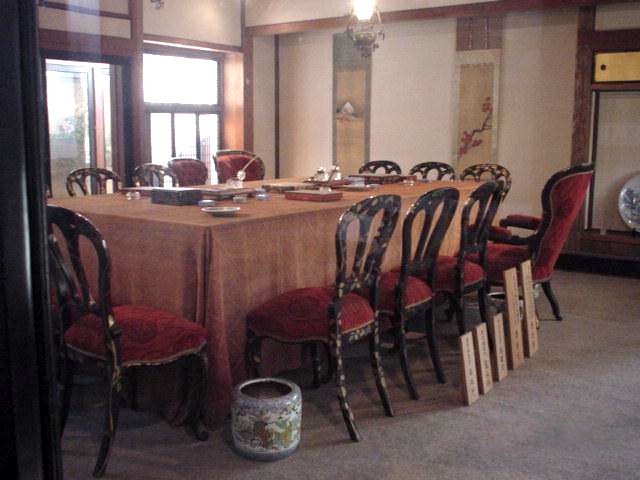
April 17: Shimonoseki treaty: Qing dynasty renounces claim on Korea

=== April ===
- April 6 – Oscar Wilde is arrested in London for "gross indecency", after losing a criminal libel case against the Marquess of Queensberry.
- April 7 – Nansen's Fram expedition to the Arctic reaches 86°13.6'N, almost 3° beyond the previous Farthest North attained.
- April 14 – A major earthquake severely damages Ljubljana, the capital of Carniola.
- April 17 – The Treaty of Shimonoseki is signed between China and Japan. This marks the end of the First Sino-Japanese War, and the defeated Qing Empire is forced to renounce its claims on Korea, and to concede the southern portion of Fengtian province, Taiwan and the Penghu to Japan. The huge indemnity exacted from China is used to establish the Yawata Iron and Steel Works in Japan.
- April 22 – Gongche Shangshu movement: 603 candidates sign a 10,000-word petition against the Treaty of Shimonoseki.
- April 27 – The unique, historic and picturesque Spiral Bridge is constructed to carry U.S. 61 over the Mississippi River at Hastings, Minnesota. It is demolished in 1951.

=== May ===
- May 2 – Gongche Shangshu movement: Thousands of Beijing scholars and citizens protest against the Treaty of Shimonoseki.
- May 9 – Thirteen workers are killed by soldiers of the Russian Empire during the Yaroslavl Great Manufacture strike.
- May 18 – The first motor race in Italy is held, on a course from Turin to Asti and back, a total of 93 km (58 mi). Five entrants start the event; only three complete it. It is won by Simone Federman in a four-seat Daimler Omnibus, at an average speed of 15.5 km/h (9.6 mph).
- May 24 – Anti-Japanese officials, led by Tang Jingsong in Taiwan, declare independence from the Qing dynasty, forming the short-lived Republic of Formosa.
- May 25 – R. v. Wilde: Oscar Wilde is convicted in London of "unlawfully committing acts of gross indecency with certain male persons" (under the Labouchere Amendment) and given a two years' sentence of hard labour, during which he will write De Profundis.
- May 27 – In re Debs: The Supreme Court of the United States decides that the federal government has the right to regulate interstate commerce, legalizing the military suppression of the Pullman Strike.

=== June ===
- June 5 – The Liberal Revolution begins in Ecuador, making the civil war more intense in the country.
- June 11
  - Britain annexes Tongaland, between Zululand and Mozambique.
  - The Paris–Bordeaux–Paris automobile trial is held.
- June 20 – The Treaty of Amapala establishes the union of Nicaragua, Honduras and El Salvador (which ends in 1898).
- June 21 – The Kiel Canal, connecting the North Sea to the Baltic across the base of the Jutland peninsula in Germany, is officially opened.
- June 28 – The United States Court of Private Land Claims rules that James Reavis's claim to the Barony of Arizona is "wholly fictitious and fraudulent".

=== July ===
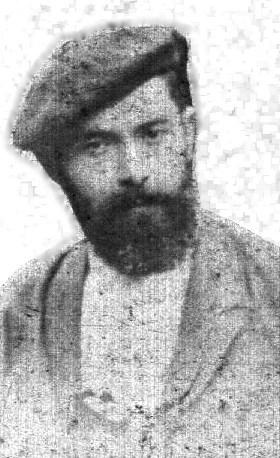
July 31: Sabino Arana founds the Basque Nationalist Party

- July 10–11 – The Doukhobors' pacifist protests culminate in the "burning of the arms" in the South Caucasus.
- July 15 – Archie MacLaren scores an English County Championship cricket record innings of 424 for Lancashire, against Somerset, at Taunton. This record lasts until 1994.
- July 31 – The Basque Nationalist Party (Euzko Alderdi Jeltzalea-Partido Nacionalista Vasco) is founded by Sabino Arana.
- July – Oldham Athletic A.F.C. is founded in England.

=== August ===
- August 7 – The Aljaž Tower, a symbol of the Slovenes, is erected on Mount Triglav.
- August 10 – The first ever indoor promenade concert, origin of The Proms, is held at the Queen's Hall in London, opening a series conducted by Henry Wood.
- August 19 – American frontier murderer and outlaw John Wesley Hardin is killed by an off-duty policeman in a saloon in El Paso, Texas.
- August 29
  - The Northern Rugby Football Union (the modern-day Rugby Football League) is formed at a meeting of 21 rugby clubs at the George Hotel, Huddersfield, in the north of England, leading to the creation of the professional sport of rugby league football.
  - The Mat Salleh Rebellion in North Borneo is incited.

=== September ===
- September – Shelbourne F.C. is founded in Dublin, Ireland.
- September 3 – The first professional American football game is played, in Latrobe, Pennsylvania, between the Latrobe YMCA and the Jeannette Athletic Club (Latrobe wins 12–0).
- September 7 – The first game of what will become known as rugby league football is played in England, starting the 1895–96 Northern Rugby Football Union season.
- September 18 – Daniel David Palmer performs the first chiropractic spinal adjustment, on Harvey Lillard, whose complaint was partial deafness after an injury.
- September 24–October 3 – the Automobile Club de France sponsors the longest race to date, a 1,710 km (1,060 mi) event, from Bordeaux to Agen and back. Because it is held in ten stages, it can be considered the first rally. The first three places are taken by two Panhards and a three-wheeler De Dion-Bouton.

=== October ===
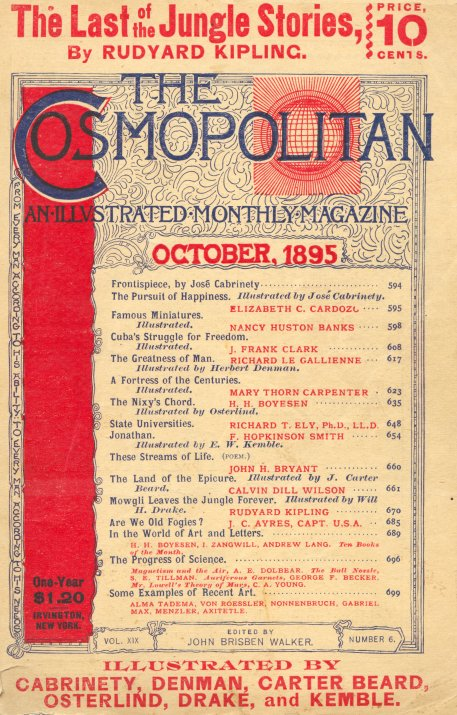
October: The Cosmopolitan (price 10 cents)

- October – Rudyard Kipling publishes the story "Mowgli Leaves the Jungle Forever" in The Cosmopolitan illustrated magazine in the United States, collected in The Second Jungle Book, published in England in November.
- October 1 – French troops capture Antananarivo, Madagascar.
- October 2 – Peiyang University, predecessor of Tianjin University, is founded as an institution of higher education in Qing dynasty China.
- October 8 – Queen Min, queen consort of Joseon (Korea), is assassinated at her private residence within Gyeongbokgung Palace by Japanese agents.
- October 10 – The London School of Economics holds its first classes in London, England.
- October 23 – The city of Tainan, last stronghold of the Republic of Formosa, capitulates to the forces of the Empire of Japan, ending the short-lived republic, and beginning the era of Taiwan under Japanese rule.
- October 31 – 1895 Charleston earthquake: A major earthquake occurs near Charleston, Missouri, in the New Madrid Seismic Zone of the midwestern United States. As of 2014, the earthquake risk for the region is being closely monitored.

=== November ===
- November 1 – Max Skladanowsky and his brother Emil present a short film at the Berlin Wintergarten theatre in Germany using the movie projector they have developed.
- November 5 – George B. Selden is granted the first U.S. patent for an automobile.
- November 8 – Wilhelm Röntgen discovers the type of electromagnetic radiation later known as X-rays.
- November 17 – Flamengo, a well known professional football club in Brazil, is officially founded.
- November 25 – Oscar Hammerstein opens the Olympia Theatre, the first theatre to be built in New York City's Times Square district.
- November 27 – At the Swedish-Norwegian Club in Paris, Alfred Nobel signs his last will and testament, setting aside his estate to establish the Nobel Prize after his death.
- November 28 – Chicago Times-Herald race: The first American automobile race in history is sponsored by the Chicago Times-Herald. Press coverage first arouses significant American interest in the automobile.

=== December ===
- December 7 – A corps of 2,350 Italian troops, mostly Askari, are crushed by 30,000 Abyssinian troops at Amba Alagi.
- December 11 – Svante Arrhenius becomes the first scientist to deliver quantified data about the sensitivity of global climate to atmospheric carbon dioxide (the "Greenhouse effect"), as he presents his paper "On the Influence of Carbonic Acid in the Air Upon The Temperature of the Ground" to the Royal Swedish Academy of Sciences.
- December 13 – The first complete performance of Gustav Mahler's Symphony No. 2 is given, with the Berlin Philharmonic orchestra conducted by the composer.
- December 15 – The railways of the Cape of Good Hope, Colony of Natal, the Orange Free State, the South African Republic and southern Mozambique are all linked at Union Junction near Alberton.
- December 18 – The Laurin & Klement automobile brand, predecessor of Škoda Auto, is founded as a bicycle manufacturer in central Bohemia (modern-day Czech Republic).
- December 24
  - Kingstown lifeboat disaster: 15 crew are lost when their life-boat capsizes while trying to rescue the crew of the Palme off Kingstown (modern-day Dún Laoghaire), near Dublin, Ireland.
  - George Washington Vanderbilt II officially opens his Biltmore Estate, inviting his family and guests to celebrate his new home in Asheville, North Carolina.
- December 28 – Auguste and Louis Lumière make what is probably the first commercial public screening of projected moving picture films to a paying audience, at the Salon Indien du Grand Café in Paris.
- December
  - Ottoman troops burn 3,000 Armenians alive in Urfa.
  - The Fourth Anglo-Ashanti War begins.

=== Date unknown ===
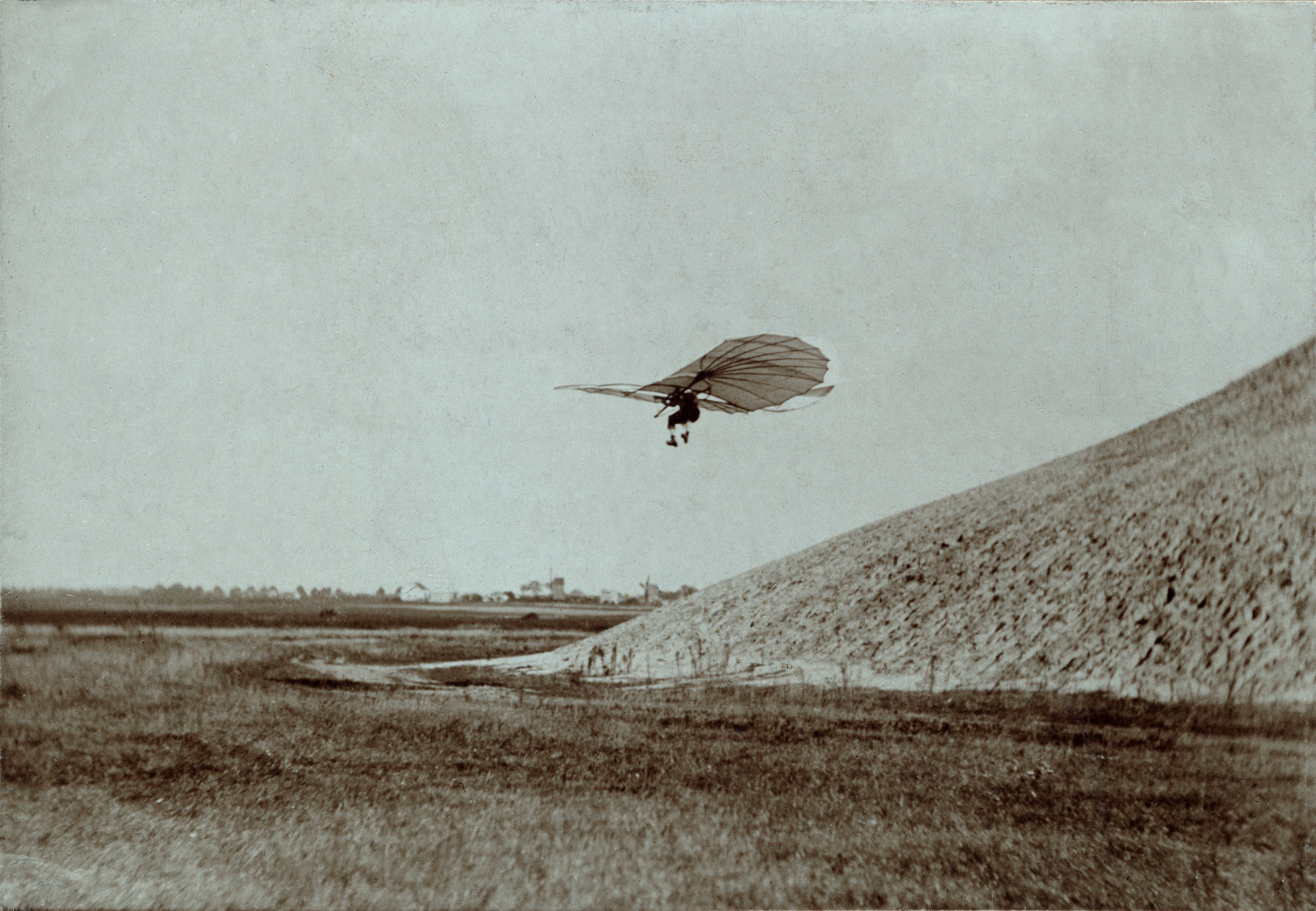
Otto Lilienthal gliding experiment

- The world's first portable handheld electric drill is developed, by brothers Wilhelm and Carl Fein in Germany.
- Konstantin Tsiolkovsky proposes a space elevator.
- The Swarovski Company is founded by Armand Kosman, Franz Weis and Daniel Swarovski in the Austrian Tyrol, for the production of crystal glass.
- The name 'HP Sauce' is first registered in the United Kingdom for a brown sauce.
- The Duck Reach Power Station opens in Tasmania (the first publicly owned hydroelectric plant in the Southern Hemisphere).
- The first sample fair (Mustermesse) is held at Leipzig, Germany.
- The first Boxer dog club is established in Germany.
- The Raiffeisen model of Cooperative Credit and Saving Bank, predecessor of Rabobank, a worldwide multiple financial service provider, is founded in the Netherlands.

== Births ==
=== January ===
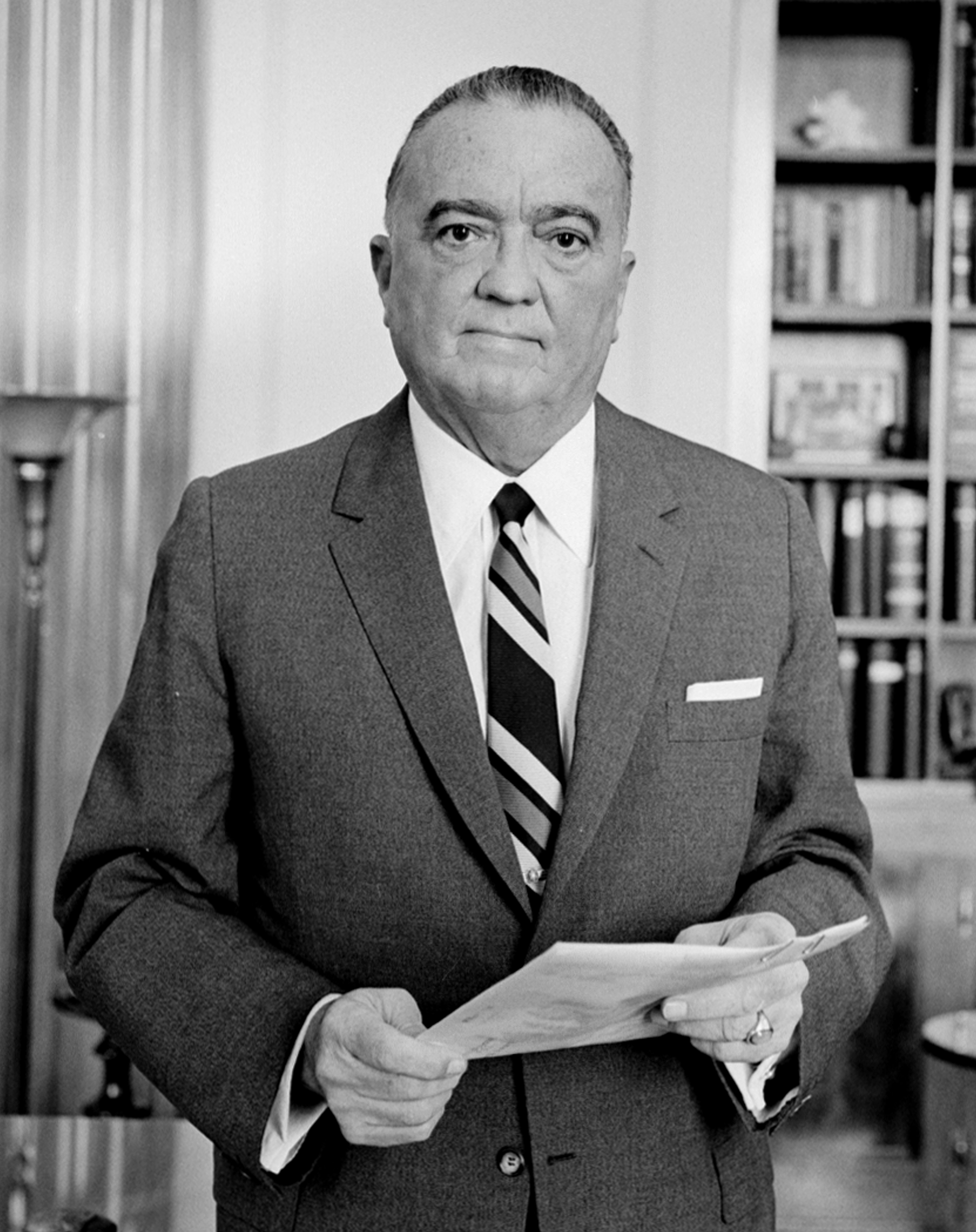
J. Edgar Hoover

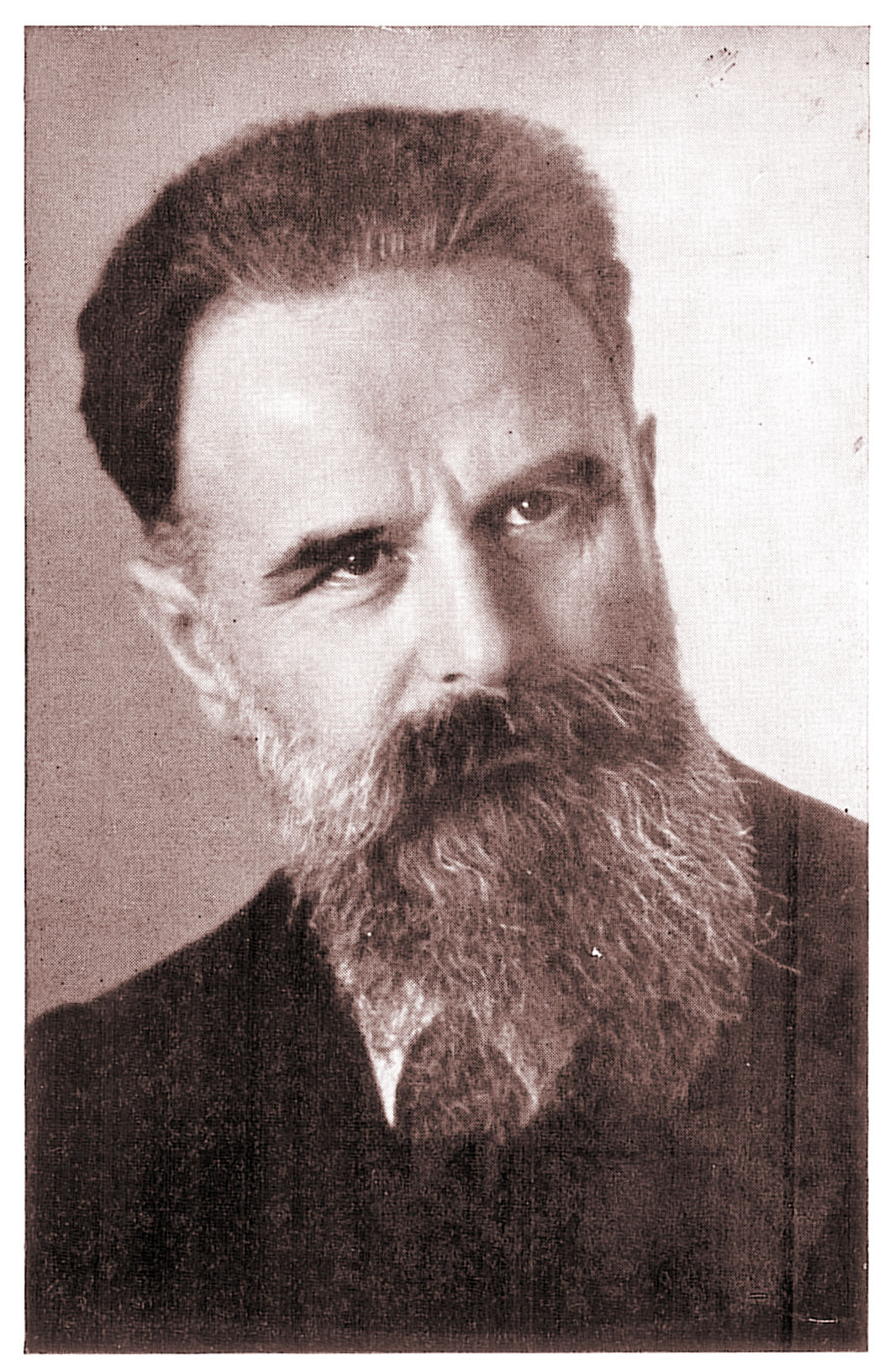
Leo Aryeh Mayer

- January 1
  - Bert Acosta, American aviator (d. 1954)
  - J. Edgar Hoover, American Federal Bureau of Investigation director (d. 1972)
- January 4 – Leroy Grumman, American aeronautical engineer, test pilot and industrialist (d. 1982)
- January 9 – Lucian Truscott, American general (d. 1965)
- January 11 – Graciela Amaya de García, Mexican feminist, organizer (d. 1995)
- January 15
  - Leo Aryeh Mayer, Israeli professor, scholar of Islamic art (d. 1959)
  - Artturi Ilmari Virtanen, Finnish chemist, Nobel Prize laureate (d. 1973)
- January 17 – Husayn Khalidi, Prime Minister of Jordan (d. 1966)
- January 19
  - Isamu Chō, Japanese general (d. 1945)
  - Arthur Coningham, British air marshal (d. 1948)
- January 21 – Cristóbal Balenciaga, Spanish-French couturier (d. 1972)
- January 30
  - Marianne Golz, Austrian-born opera singer and World War II resistance member (d. 1943)
  - Wilhelm Gustloff, German-born Swiss Nazi party leader (d. 1936)

=== February ===
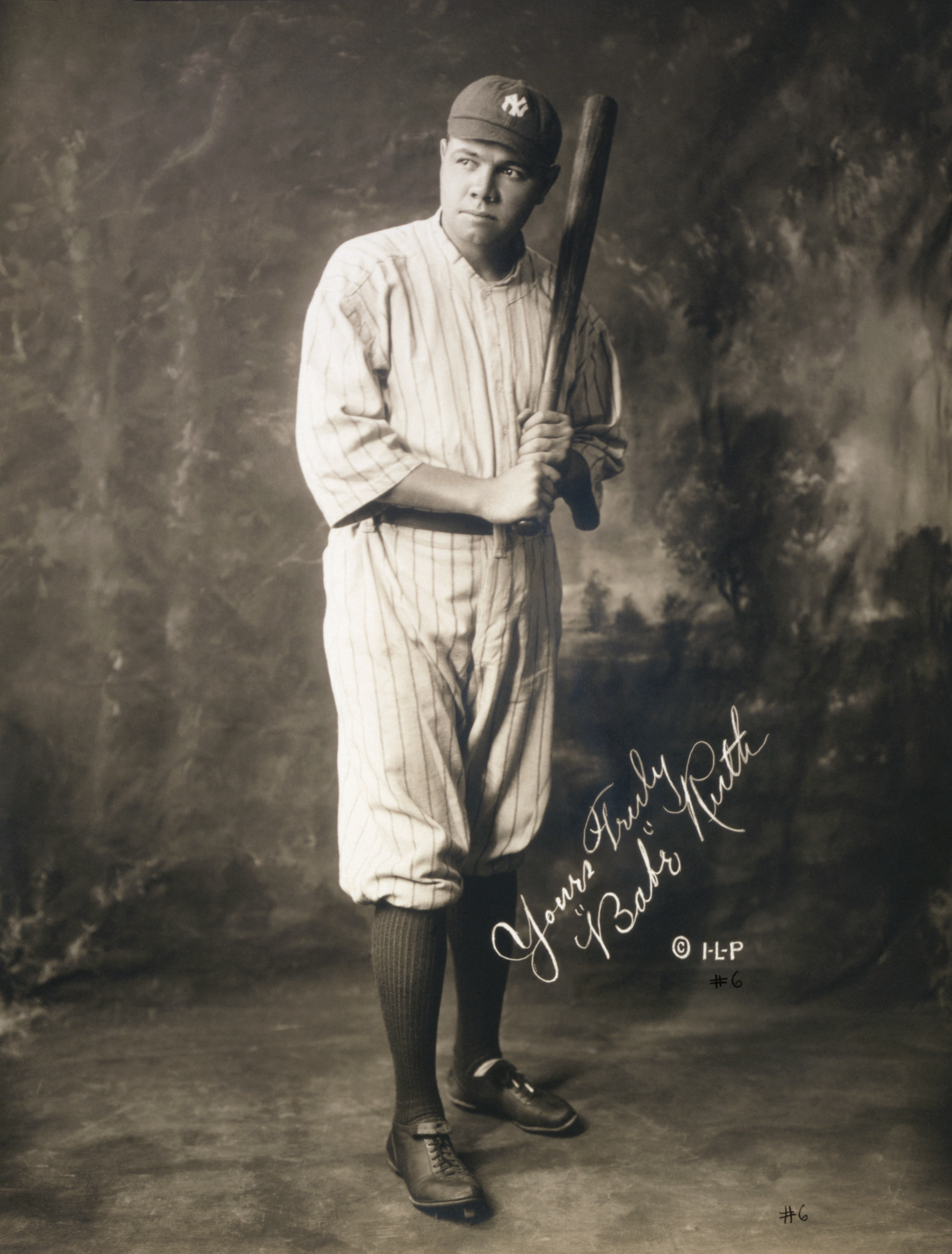
Babe Ruth

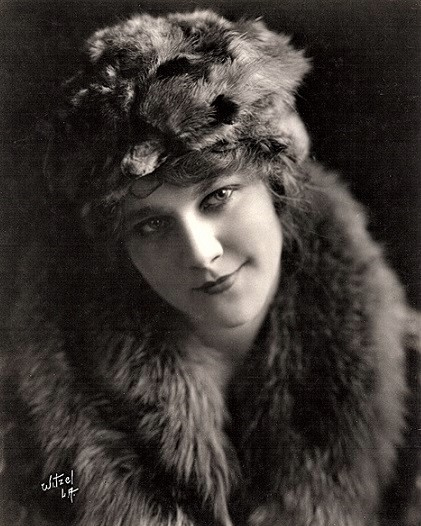
Louise Lovely

- February 2 – George Halas, American football player and coach, co-founder of the National Football League (d. 1983)
- February 6 – Babe Ruth, American baseball player (d. 1948)
- February 8 – Khorloogiin Choibalsan, Marshal of the Mongolian People's Republic, Prime Minister of the Mongolian People's Republic (d. 1952)
- February 10 – Victor Jacob Koningsberger, Dutch botanist (d. 1966)
- February 14 – Max Horkheimer, German philosopher, sociologist (d. 1973)
- February 15 – Earl Thomson, Canadian athlete (d. 1971)
- February 18 (O.S. 6 February) – Semyon Timoshenko, Soviet general, Marshal of the Soviet Union (d. 1970)
- February 19
  - Louis Calhern, American actor (d. 1956)
  - Diego Mazquiarán, Spanish matador (d. 1940)
- February 21 – Henrik Dam, Danish biochemist, recipient of the Nobel Prize in Physiology or Medicine (d. 1976)
- February 27 – Edward Brophy, American character actor (d. 1960)
- February 28
  - Louise Lovely, Australian actress (d. 1980)
  - Marcel Pagnol, French novelist, playwright (d. 1974)

=== March ===
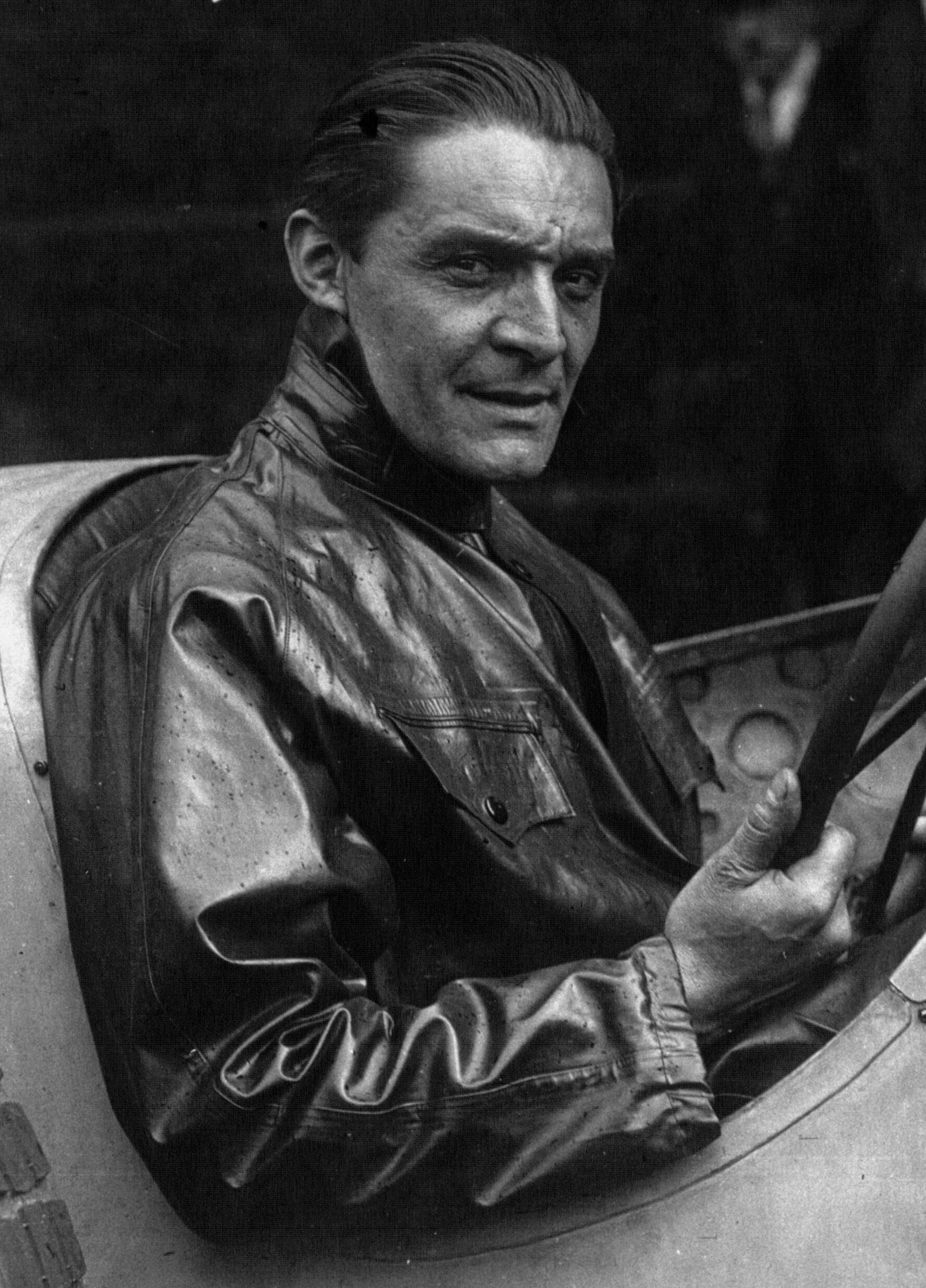
Robert Benoist

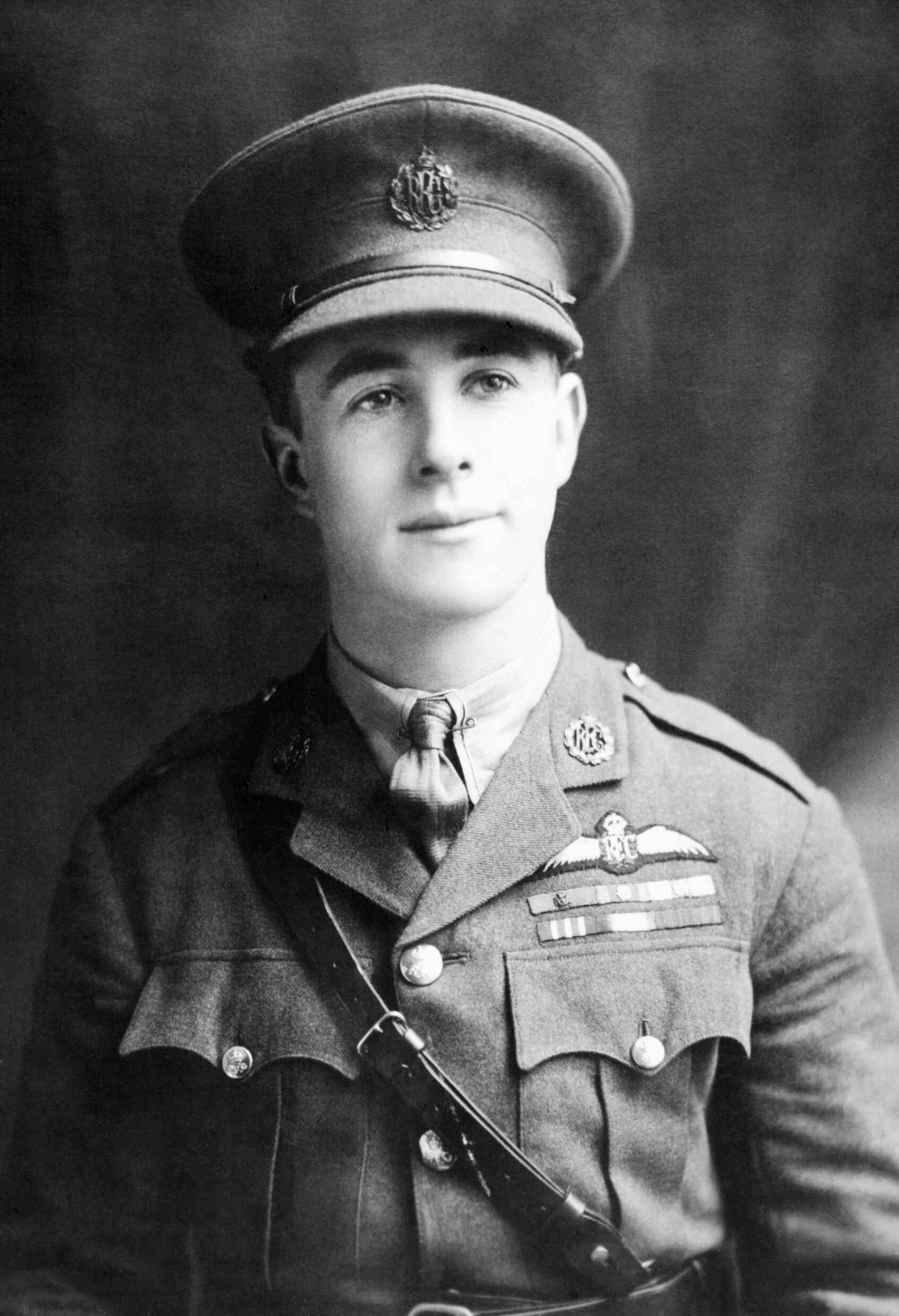
James McCudden

- March 3
  - Ragnar Frisch, Norwegian economist, Nobel Prize laureate (d. 1973)
  - Matthew Ridgway, United States Army Chief of Staff, Commander of NATO (d. 1993)
- March 6 – Robert Carney, American admiral (d. 1990)
- March 11 – Shemp Howard, American actor, comedian (The Three Stooges) (d. 1955)
- March 15 – Tobie Goedewaagen, Dutch philosopher and Nazi collaborator (d. 1980)
- March 20 – Robert Benoist, French race car driver, war hero (d. 1944)
- March 23 – Encarnacion Alzona, Filipino historian and suffragist (d. 2001)
- March 27 – Ruth Snyder, American murderer (d. 1928)
- March 28
  - Spencer W. Kimball, 12th president of the Church of Jesus Christ of Latter-day Saints (d. 1985)
  - James McCudden, British World War I flying ace (d. 1918)
- March 29
  - Ernst Jünger, German military hero, philosopher and entomologist (d. 1998)
  - George Vasey, Australian general (d. 1945)
- March 30 – Carl Lutz, Swiss-American World War II humanitarian (d. 1975)

=== April ===
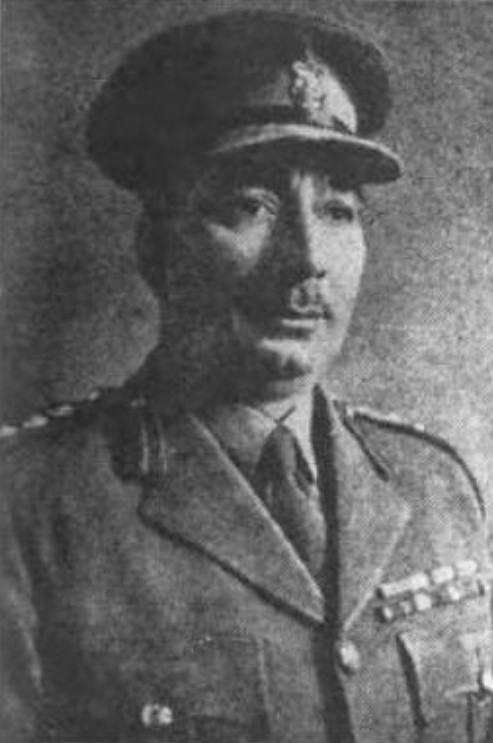
Mohammad Akbar Khan

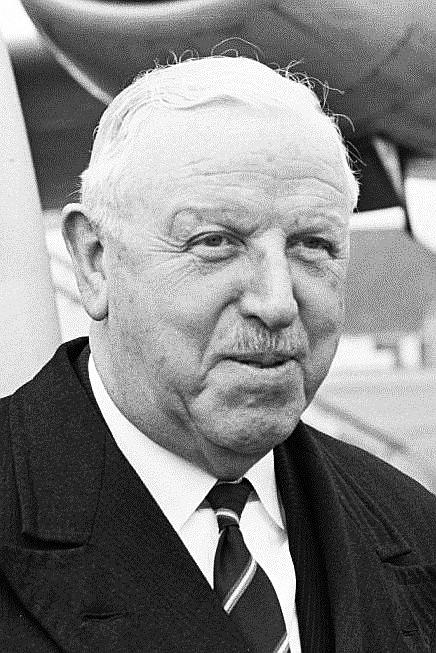
Sir Stanley Rous

- April 1 – Alberta Hunter, American singer (d. 1984)
- April 3 – Mario Castelnuovo-Tedesco, Italian composer (d. 1968)
- April 4 – John Kotelawala, 3rd Prime Minister of Sri Lanka (d. 1980)
- April 5 – Mike O'Dowd, American boxer (d. 1957)
- April 13 – Olga Rudge, American violinist (d. 1996)
- April 14 – Anton Reinthaller, Austrian right-wing politician (d. 1958)
- April 19 - Mohammad Akbar Khan, First Muslim to become a Brigadier in the British Indian Army and First Muslim Major General of the Pakistan Army.
- April 25 – Stanley Rous, English administrator, 6th President of FIFA (d. 1986)
- April 26 – Hans Kopfermann, German physicist (d. 1963)
- April 29 – Malcolm Sargent, English conductor (d. 1967)

=== May ===
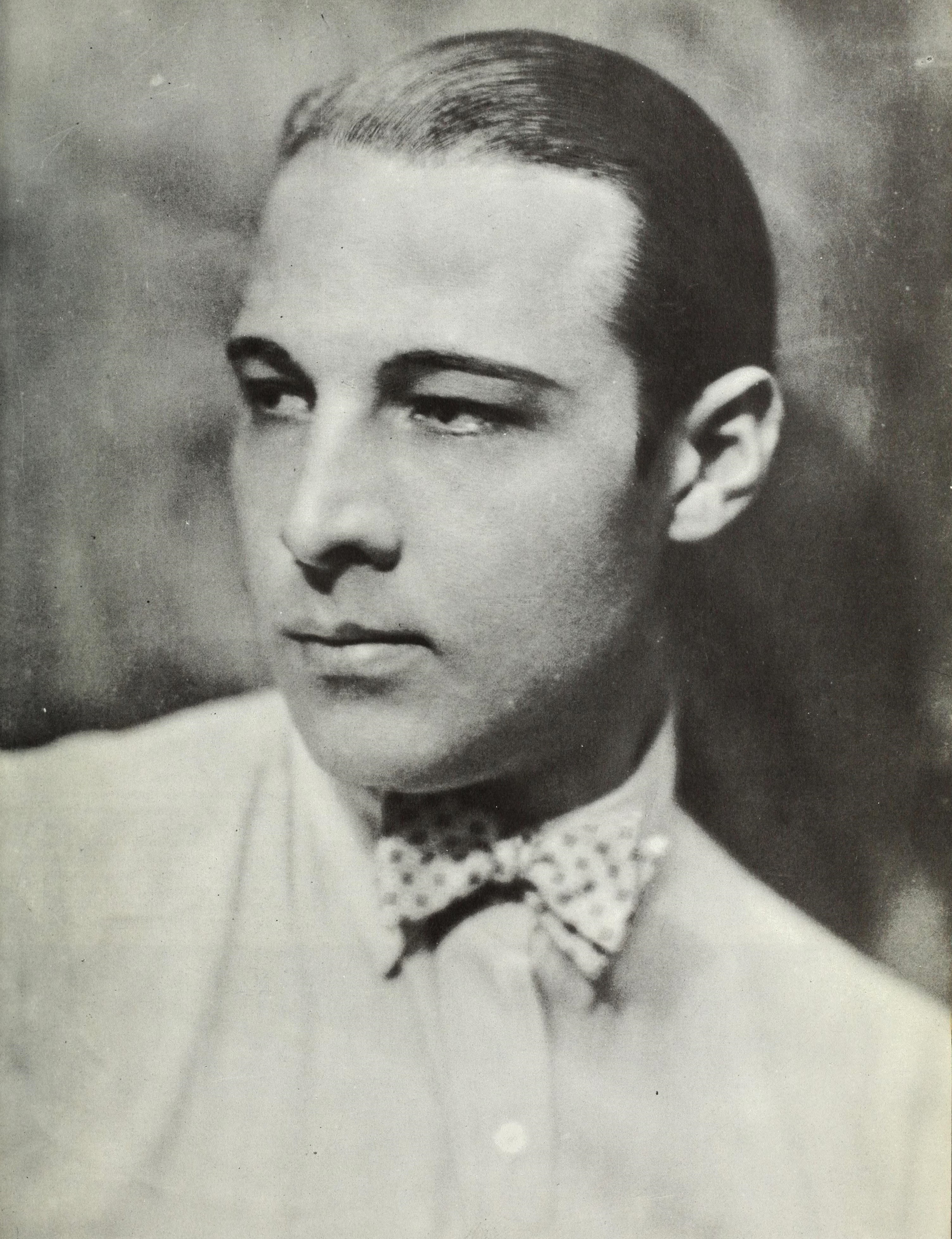
Rudolph Valentino

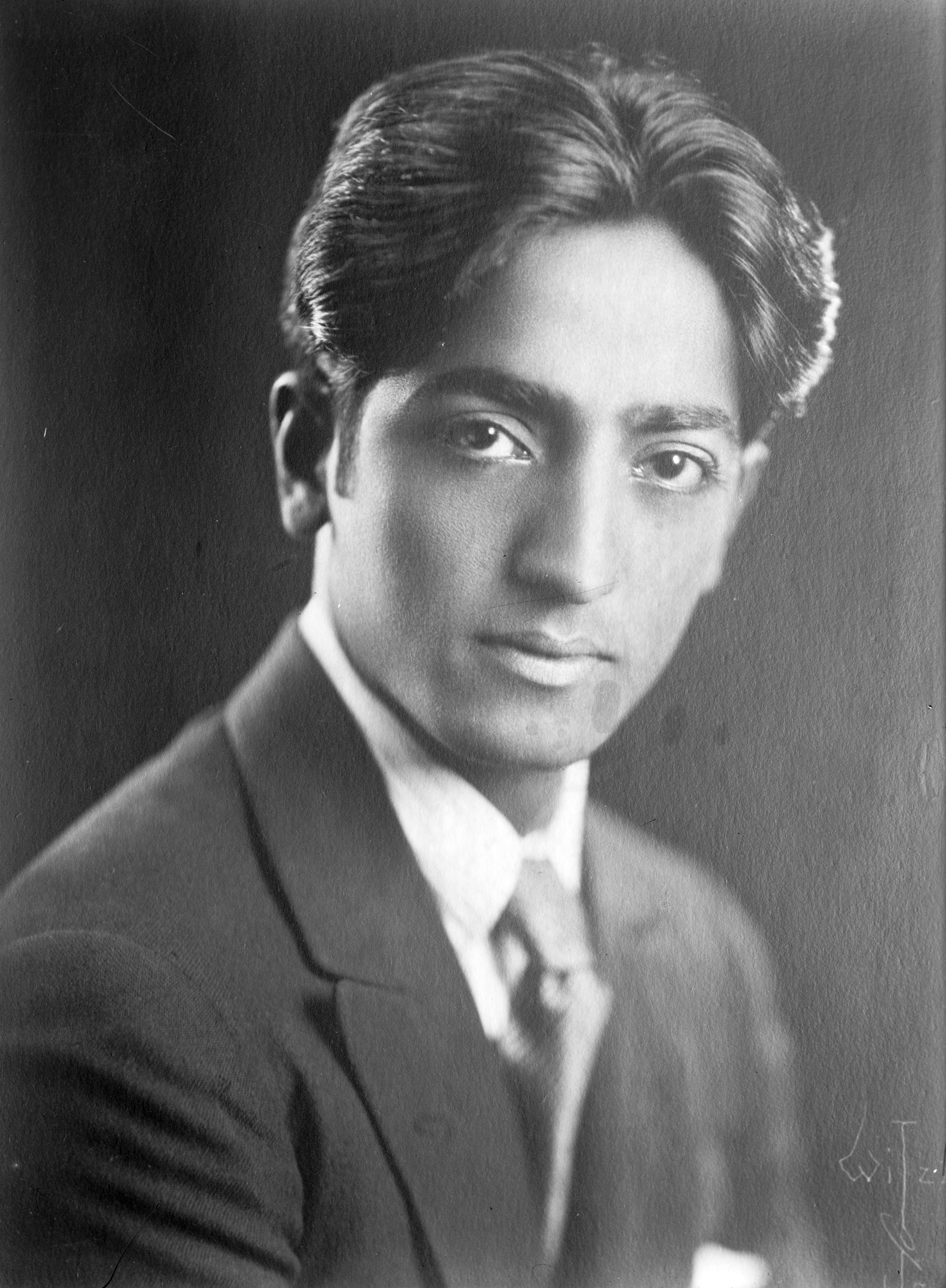
Jiddu Krishnamurti

- May 1 – Nikolai Yezhov, Soviet politician and police chief, Great Purge Perpetrator (d. 1940)
- May 2 – Lorenz Hart, American lyricist (d. 1943)
- May 5 – Charles Lamont, Russian-born film director (d. 1993)
- May 6 – Rudolph Valentino, Italian actor (d. 1926)
- May 8 – Fulton J. Sheen, American Catholic archbishop, television personality (d. 1979)
- May 9 – Richard Barthelmess, American actor (d. 1963)
- May 11 – Jiddu Krishnamurti, Indian philosopher, speaker and writer (d. 1986)
- May 12 – William Giauque, Canadian chemist, Nobel Prize laureate (d. 1982)
- May 15 – Prescott Bush, American banker and politician (d. 1972)
- May 17 – Saul Adler, Russian-born British-Israeli expert on parasitology (d. 1966)
- May 21 – Lázaro Cárdenas, 44th President of Mexico, 1934–1940 (d. 1970)
- May 24 – Geneviève Guitel, French mathematician and historian of mathematics (d. 1982)
- May 25 – Dorothea Lange, American documentary photographer, photojournalist (d. 1965)

=== June ===
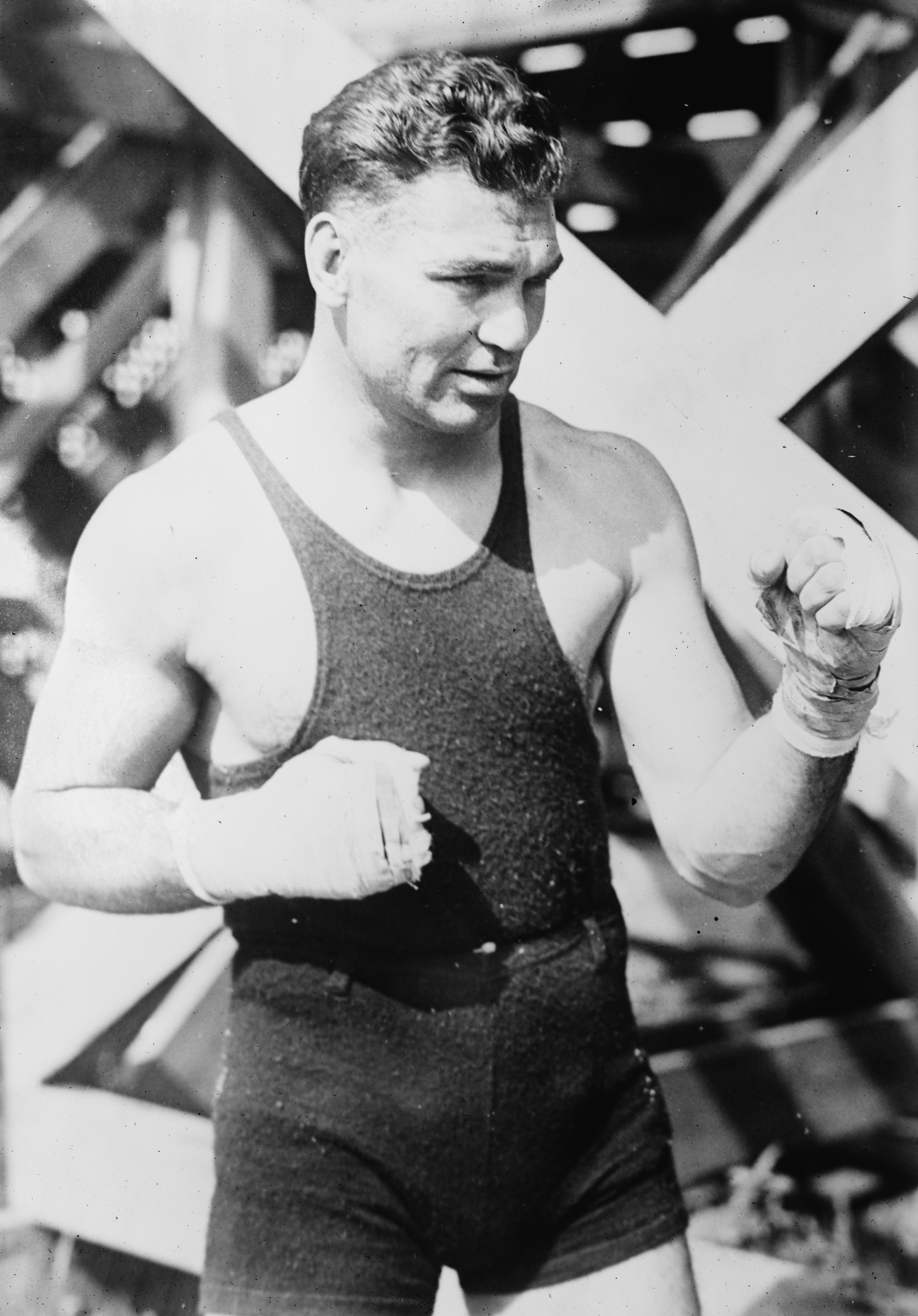
Jack Dempsey

- June 3 – K. M. Panikkar, Indian scholar, diplomat and journalist (d. 1963)
- June 4
  - Dino Grandi, Italian Fascist politician (d. 1988)
  - Russell Hicks, American actor (d. 1957)
- June 5 – William Boyd, American actor (d. 1972)
- June 10 – Cemal Gürsel, Turkish army officer, President (d. 1966)
- June 12
  - Eugénie Brazier, French cook (d. 1977)
  - Wilfrid Kent Hughes, Australian Olympian and politician (d. 1970)
- June 15 – Irina Odoyevtseva, Russian poet, novelist and memoirist (d. 1990)
- June 17
  - Louise Fazenda, American actress (d. 1962)
  - Ruben Rausing, Swedish entrepreneur, founder of Tetra Pak (d. 1983)
- June 24 – Jack Dempsey, American boxer (d. 1983)

=== July ===
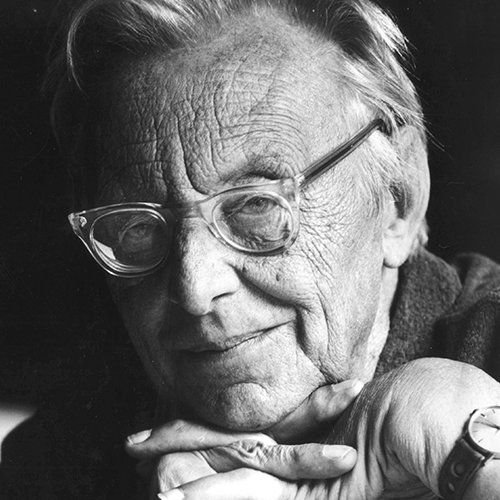
Carl Orff

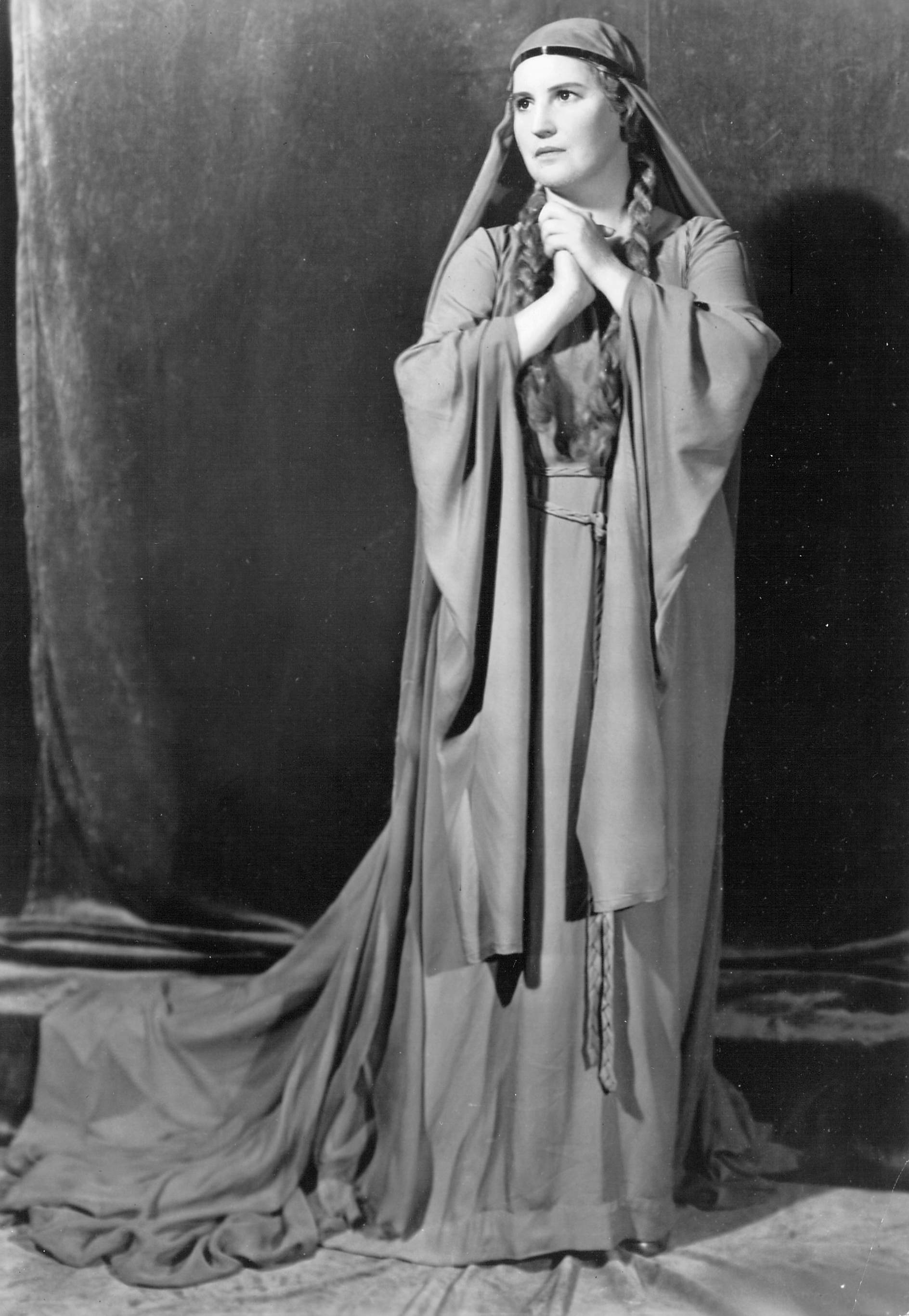
Kirsten Flagstad

- July 2 – Pavel Sukhoi, Russian aircraft engineer (d. 1975)
- July 8 – Igor Tamm, Russian physicist, Nobel Prize laureate (d. 1971)
- July 9 – Frederick Hanson, New Zealand soldier, engineer, military leader and public servant (d. 1979)
- July 10
  - Carl Orff, German composer (d. 1982)
  - Nahum Goldmann, Russian-born Zionist (d. 1982)
- July 12
  - Kirsten Flagstad, Norwegian soprano (d. 1982)
  - Oscar Hammerstein II, American musical theater lyricist, (d. 1960)
  - Buckminster Fuller, American architect (d. 1983)
- July 14
  - Jin Yuelin, Chinese philosopher (d. 1984)
  - LeRoy Prinz, American choreographer, director and producer (d. 1983)
- July 18 – Olga Spessivtseva, Russian ballerina (d. 1991)
- July 19 – Xu Beihong, Chinese painter (d. 1953)
- July 21 – Ken Maynard, American actor (d. 1973)
- July 22 – León de Greiff, Colombian poet (d. 1976)
- July 23 – Aileen Pringle, American actress (d. 1989)
- July 24 – Robert Graves, English writer (d. 1985)
- July 26 – Gracie Allen, American actress and comedian (d. 1964)

=== August ===
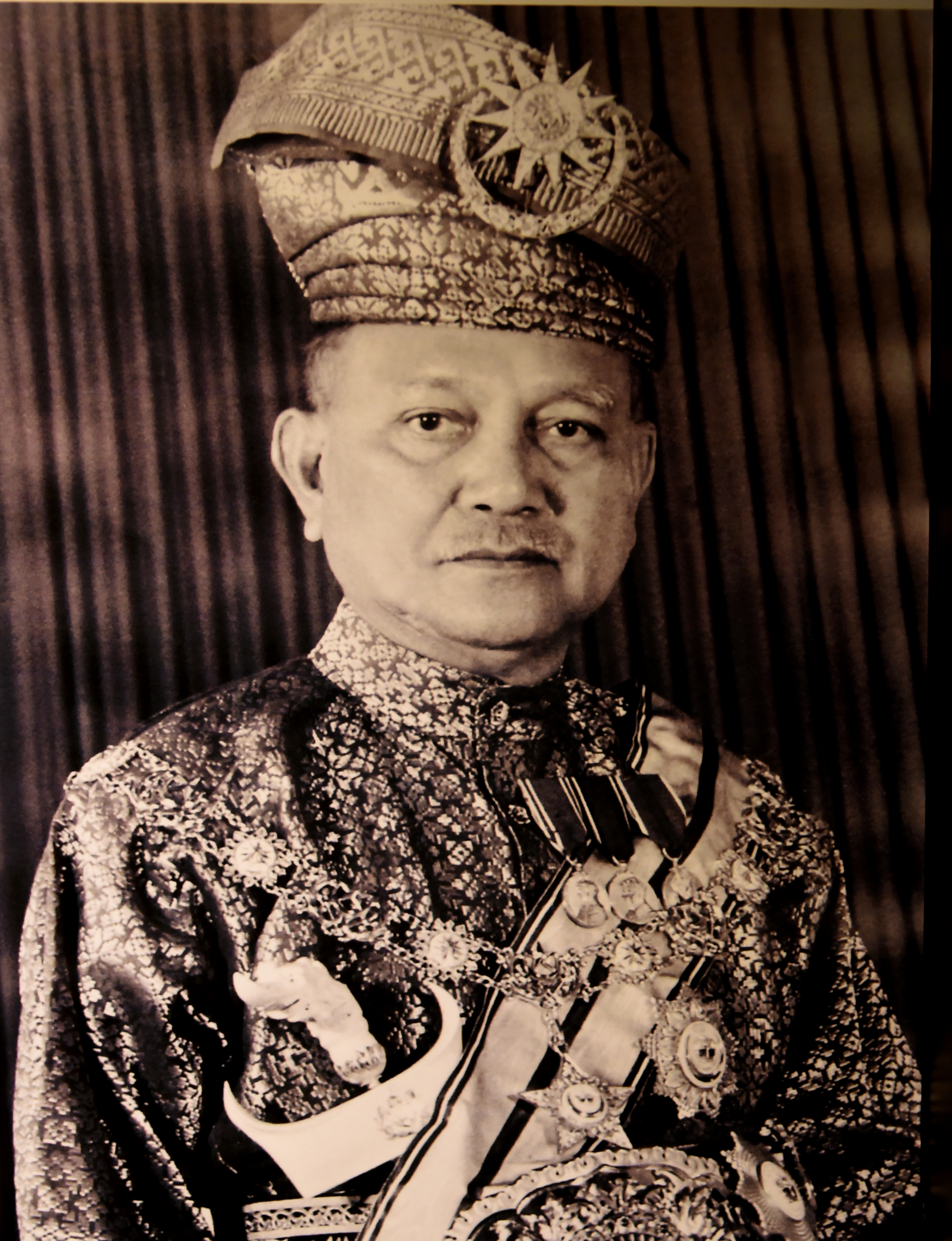
Abdul Rahman of Negeri Sembilan

- August 8 – Jean Navarre, French World War I fighter ace (d. 1919)
- August 16
  - Liane Haid, Austrian actress (d. 2000)
  - Lucien Littlefield, American actor (d. 1960)
- August 24
  - Guido Masiero, Italian World War I flying ace, aviation pioneer (d. 1942)
  - Abdul Rahman of Negeri Sembilan, King of Malaysia (d.1960)
- August 28 – Elizabeth Carter Bogardus, Hawaiian Kingdom community leader (d. 1928)

=== September ===
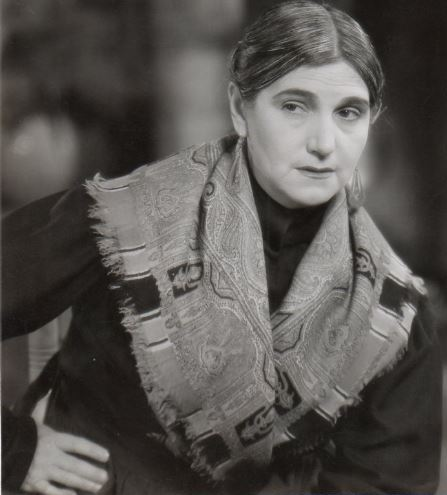
Sara García

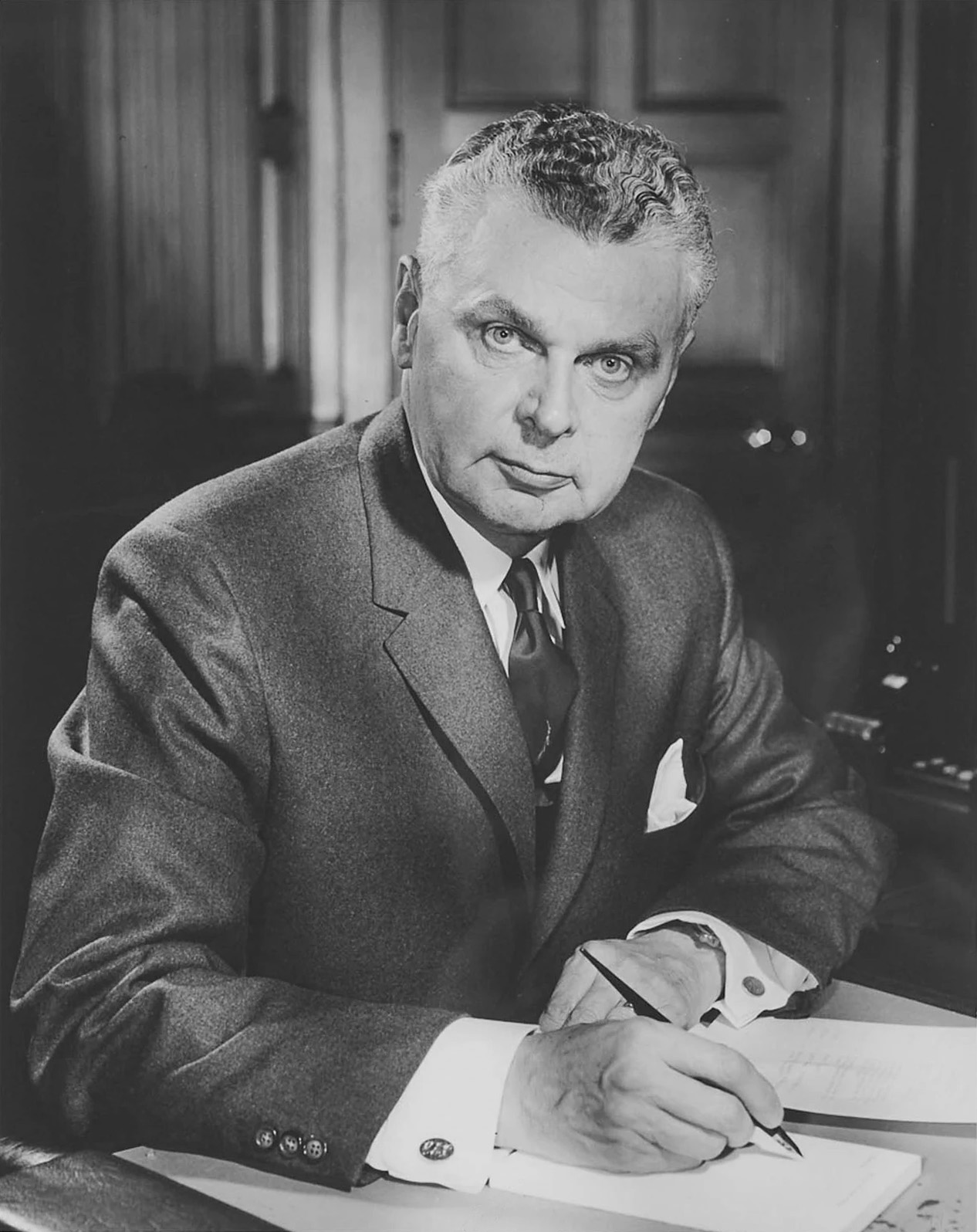
John Diefenbaker

- September 1
  - Chembai, Indian Carnatic musician (d. 1974)
  - Engelbert Zaschka, German helicopter pioneer (d. 1955)
- September 6 – Margery Perham, English Africanist (d. 1982)
- September 7 – Sir Brian Horrocks, British general (d. 1985)
- September 8 – Sara García, Mexican actress (d. 1980)
- September 11 – Vinoba Bhave, Indian religious leader (d. 1982)
- September 13
  - Ruth McDevitt, American actress (d. 1976)
  - Bernard Warburton-Lee, British naval officer, Victoria Cross recipient (d. 1940)
- September 18
  - John Diefenbaker, 13th Prime Minister of Canada (d. 1979)
- September 20 – Joseph Frank Wehner, American World War I flying ace (d. 1918)
- September 21 – Juan de la Cierva, Spanish civil engineer, aviator, aeronautical engineer and inventor of the autogyro (d. 1936)
- September 22 – Paul Muni, Austro-Hungarian-born American actor (d. 1967)
- September 24 – André Frédéric Cournand, French-born physician, recipient of the Nobel Prize in Physiology or Medicine (d. 1988)
- September 29 – Joseph Banks Rhine, American parapsychologist (d. 1980)
- September 30 – Aleksandr Vasilevsky, Soviet general, Marshal of the Soviet Union (d. 1977)

=== October ===
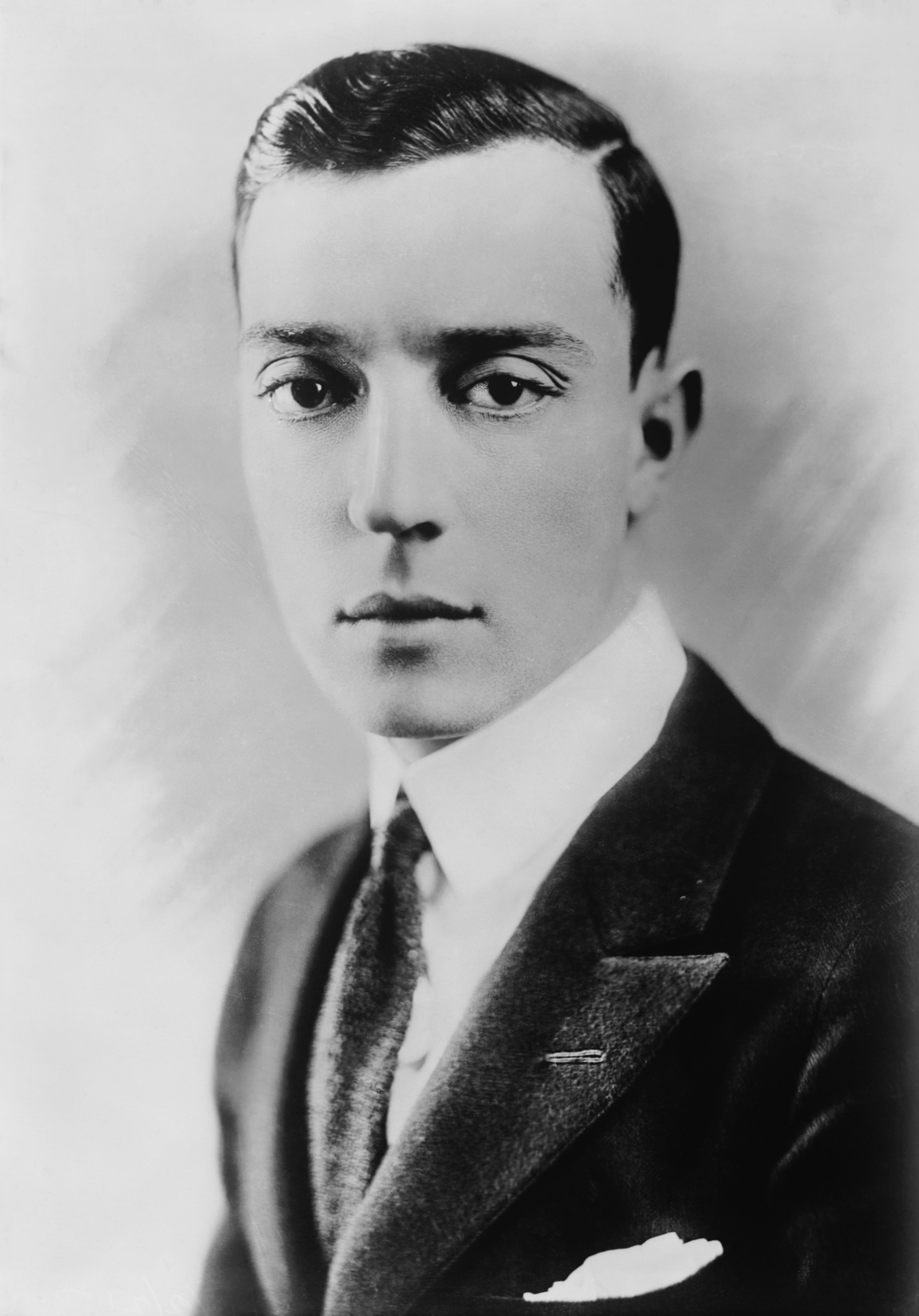
Buster Keaton

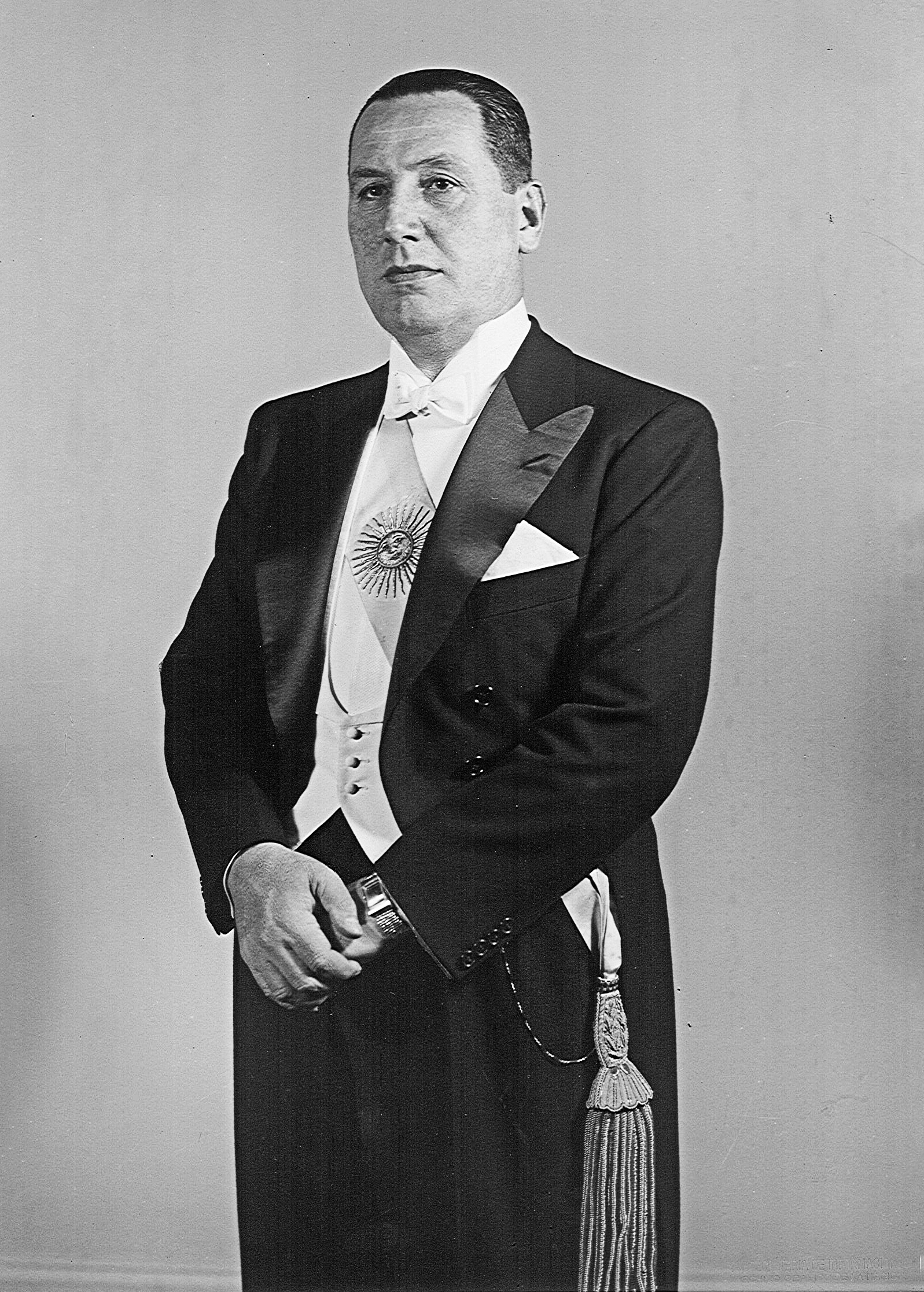
Juan Perón

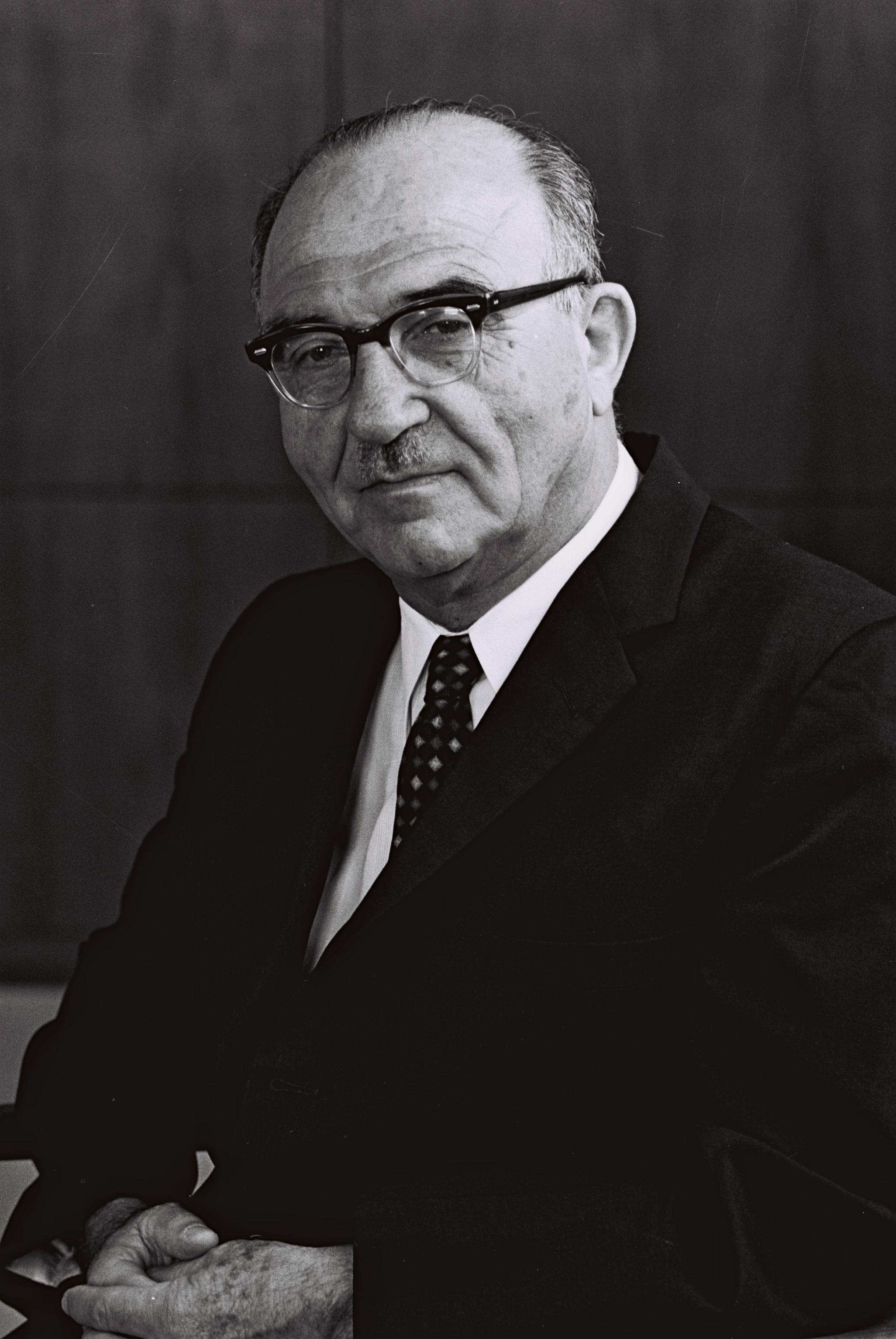
Levi Eshkol

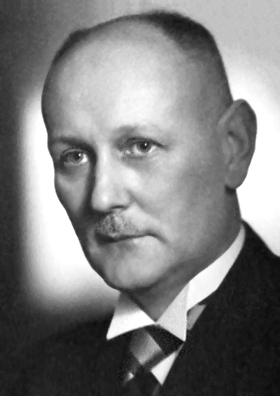
Gerhard Domagk

- October 1 – Liaquat Ali Khan, 1st Prime Minister of Pakistan (d. 1951)
- October 3 – Sergei Yesenin, Russian lyric poet (d. 1925)
- October 4
  - Buster Keaton, American actor, film director (d. 1966)
  - Richard Sorge, German-born Soviet spy (k. 1944)
- October 8
  - Juan Perón, two-time President of Argentina (d. 1974)
  - King Zog of Albania (d. 1961)
- October 9 – Ivan Yumashev, Soviet admiral (d. 1972)
- October 10 – Wolfram von Richthofen, German field marshal (d. 1945)
- October 17 – Miguel Ydígoras Fuentes, 21st President of Guatemala (d. 1982)
- October 19 – Lewis Mumford, American historian (d. 1990)
- October 20 –
  - Evelyn Brent, American actress (d. 1975)
  - Rex Ingram, African American actor (d. 1969)
  - Morrie Ryskind, American dramatist (d. 1985)
- October 21 – Edna Purviance, American actress (d. 1958)
- October 22 – Rolf Nevanlinna, Finnish mathematician (d. 1980)
- October 24 – Charles Walter Allfrey, British general (d. 1964)
- October 25
  - Levi Eshkol, Israeli Prime Minister (d. 1969)
  - Gilda Gray, Polish-born American dancer and actress (d. 1959)
- October 30
  - Gerhard Domagk, German bacteriologist, recipient of the Nobel Prize in Physiology or Medicine (declined) (d. 1964)
  - Dickinson W. Richards, American physician, recipient of the Nobel Prize in Physiology or Medicine (d. 1973)
- October 31 – Basil Liddell Hart, British military historian (d. 1970)

=== November ===
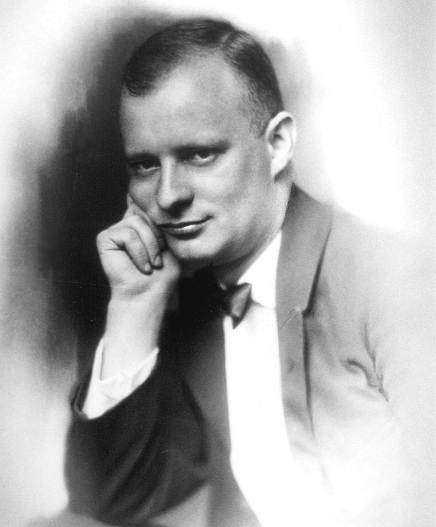
Paul Hindemith

- November 4 – Thomas G. W. Settle, American record-setting balloonist and admiral (d. 1980)
- November 5 – Walter Gieseking, German pianist (d. 1956)
- November 10 – Jack Northrop, American airplane manufacturer (d. 1981)
- November 14 – Walter Jackson Freeman II, American neurologist (d. 1972)
- November 15 – Grand Duchess Olga Nikolaevna of Russia (d. 1918)
- November 16 – Paul Hindemith, German composer (d. 1963)
- November 17 – Mikhail Bakhtin, Russian philosopher, literary scholar (d. 1975)
- November 25
  - Wilhelm Kempff, German pianist (d. 1991)
  - Helen Hooven Santmyer, American writer (d. 1986)
  - Ludvík Svoboda, 8th President of Czechoslovakia (d. 1979)
- November 29
  - Busby Berkeley, American film director, choreographer (d. 1976)
  - William Tubman, 19th President of Liberia (d. 1971)

=== December ===
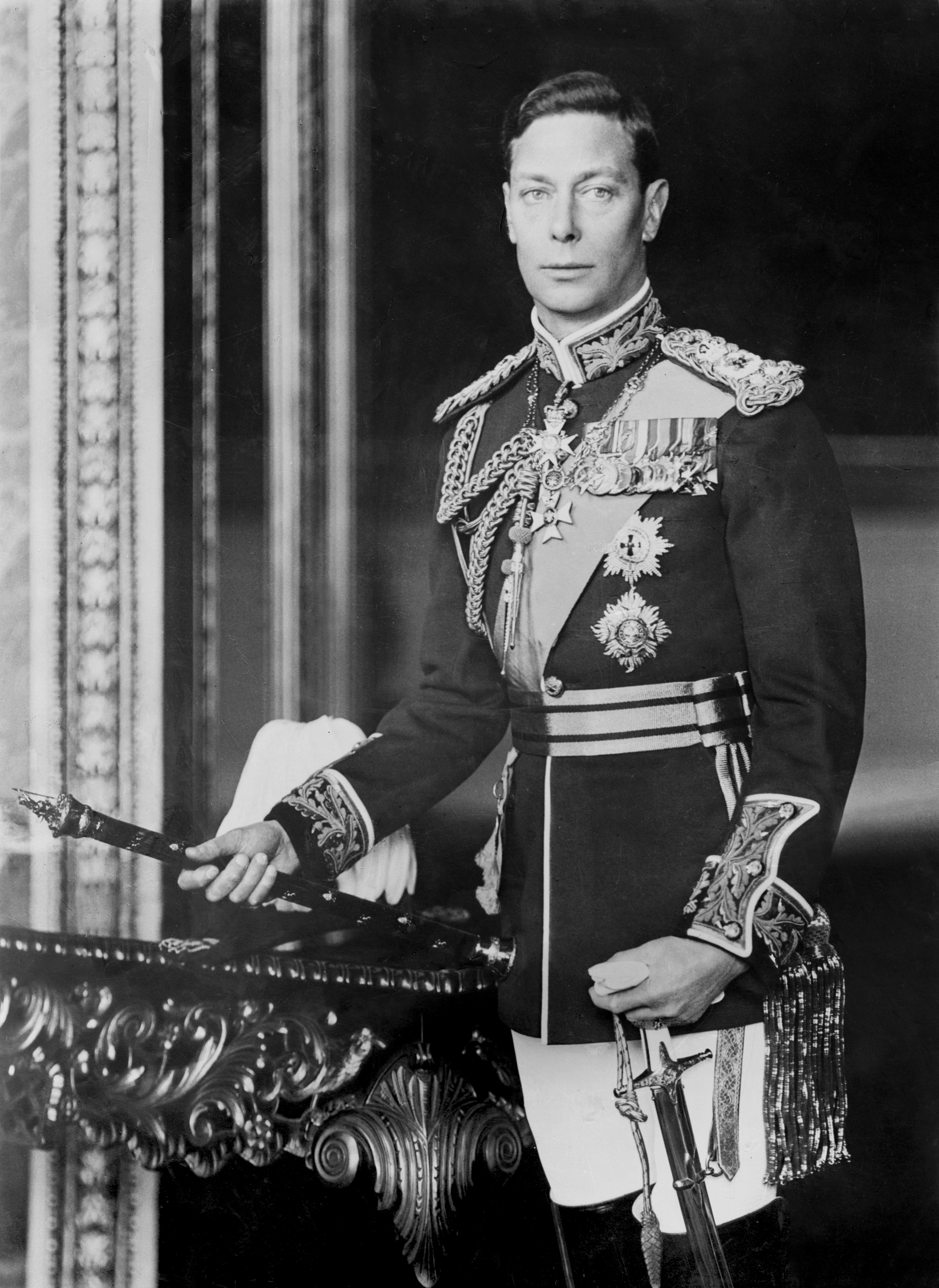
George VI

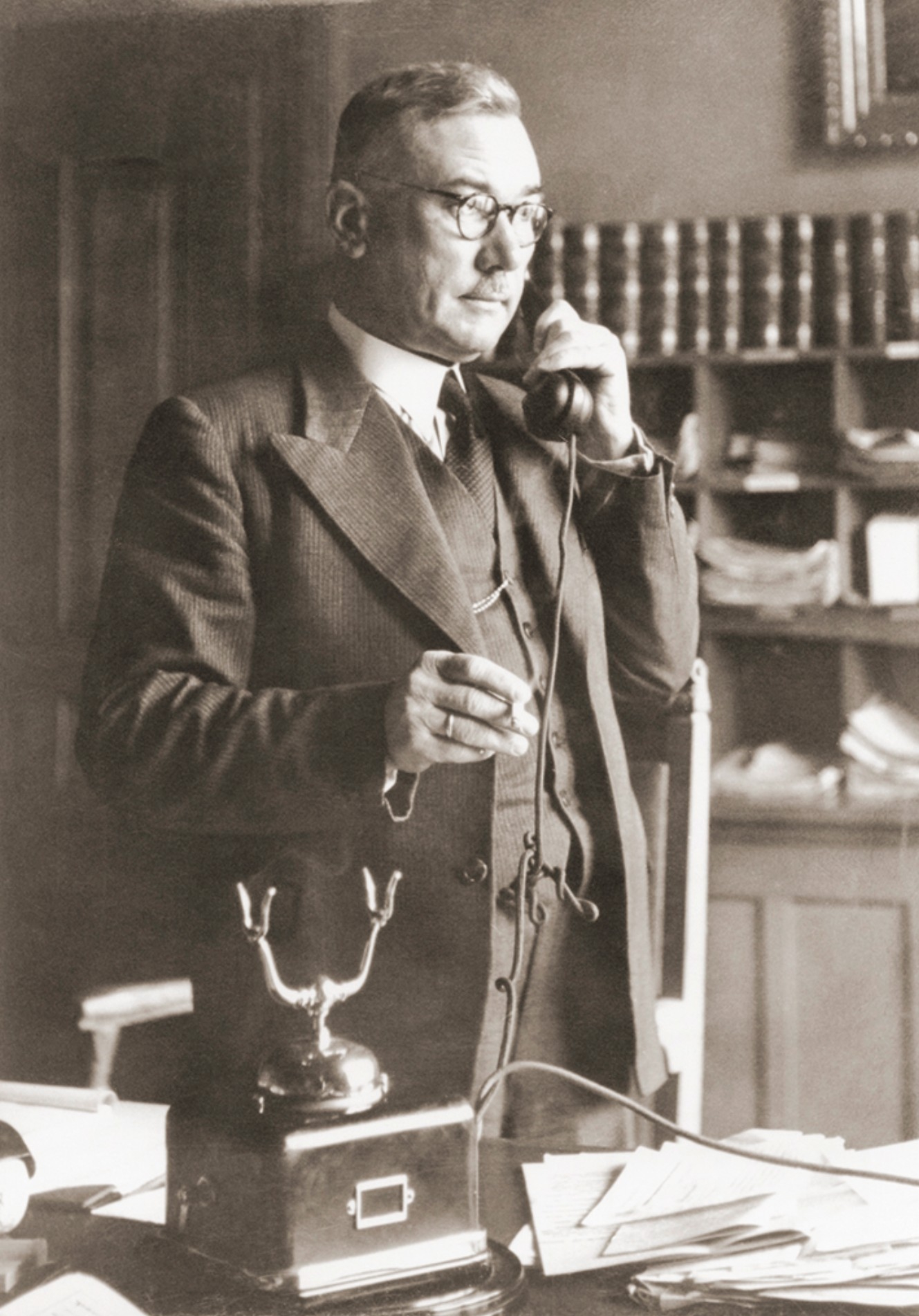
Josef Hoop

- December 2 – Harriet Cohen, English pianist (d. 1967)
- December 3 – Sheng Shicai, Chinese warlord (d. 1970)
- December 5 – Mamerto Urriolagoitía, 43rd President of Bolivia (d. 1974)
- December 9
  - Whina Cooper, New Zealand schoolteacher, historian and activist (d. 1994)
  - Dolores Ibárruri, Spanish republican leader (d. 1989)
- December 11 – Leo Ornstein, Russian-American composer (d. 2002)
- December 14
  - Paul Éluard, French poet (d. 1952)
  - King George VI of the United Kingdom (d. 1952)
  - Josef Hoop, Prime Minister of Liechtenstein (d. 1952)
- December 24 – Marguerite Williams, African-American geologist (d.1991)

=== Date unknown ===
- Tawfik Abu Al-Huda, 4-Time Prime Minister of Jordan (d. 1956)

== Deaths ==
=== January–February ===
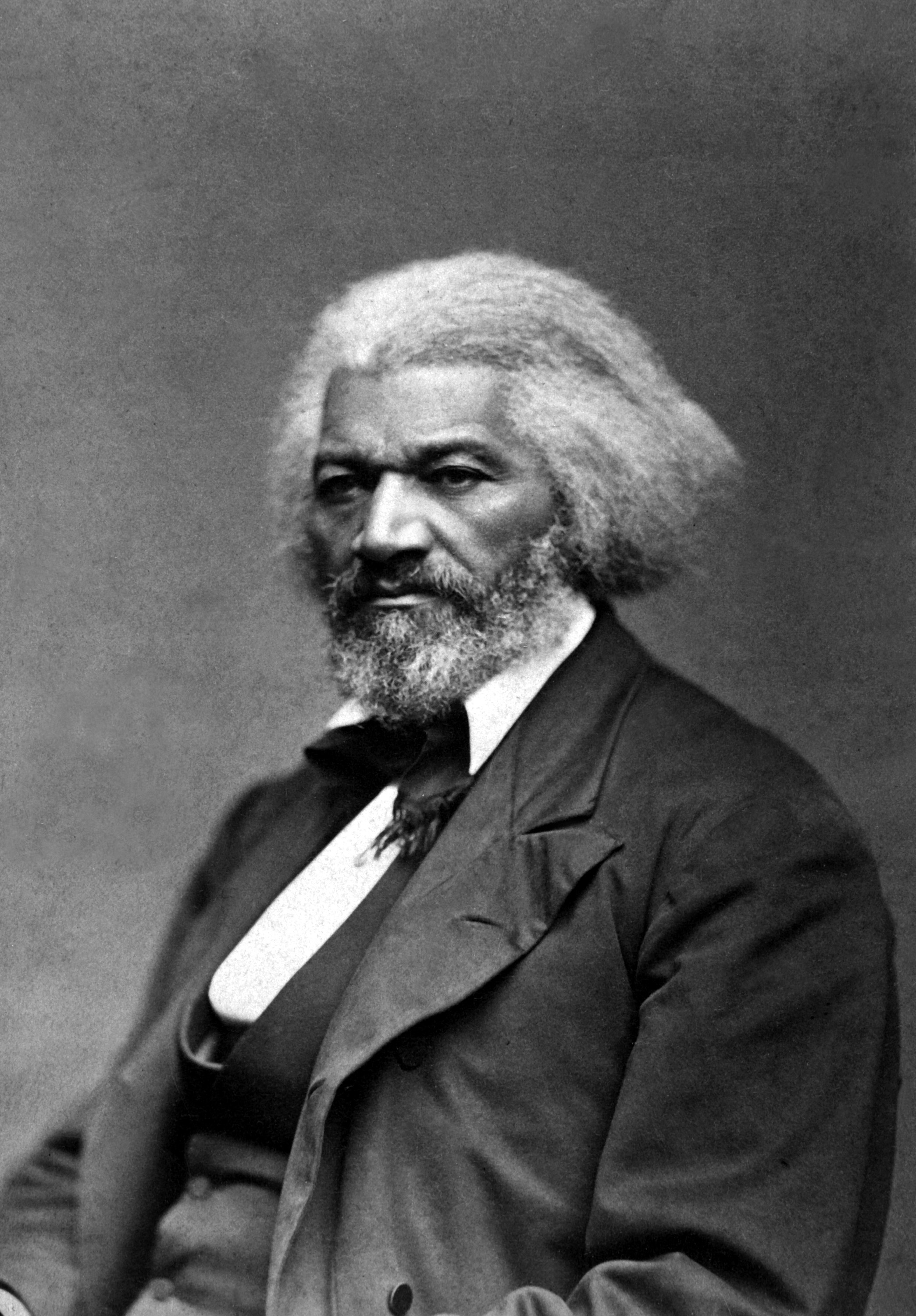
Frederick Douglass

T. Muthuswamy Iyer

- January 3 – Mary Torrans Lathrap, American temperance reformer (b. 1838)
- January 4 – William Loring, British admiral (b. 1811)
- January 9 – Aaron Lufkin Dennison, American watchmaker (b. 1812)
- January 10 – Benjamin Godard, French composer (b. 1849)
- January 19 – António Luís de Seabra, 1st Viscount of Seabra, Portuguese magistrate and politician (b. 1798)
- January 24 – Lord Randolph Churchill, British statesman (b. 1849)
- January 25 – T. Muthuswamy Iyer, Lawyer, first Indian Judge of the Madras high court (b. 1832)
- January 26 – Arthur Cayley, British mathematician, (b. 1821)
- January 27 – John Erskine, Irish-American jurist and United States district judge from 1865 to 1883 (b. 1813)
- January 28 – François Certain de Canrobert, French general, Marshal of France (b. 1809)
- February 9 – Ōdera Yasuzumi, Japanese general (killed in action) (b. 1846)
- February 10 – Liu Buchan, Chinese admiral (suicide) (b. 1852)
- February 12 – Ding Ruchang, Chinese army officer, admiral (killed in action) (b. 1836)
- February 18 – Archduke Albrecht, Duke of Teschen, Austrian general (b. 1817)
- February 20 – Frederick Douglass, American ex-slave and author (b. c.1818)
- February 25 – Henry Bruce, 1st Baron Aberdare, politician (b. 1815)
- February 26 – Salvador de Itúrbide y Marzán, Prince of Mexico (b. 1849)

=== March–April ===
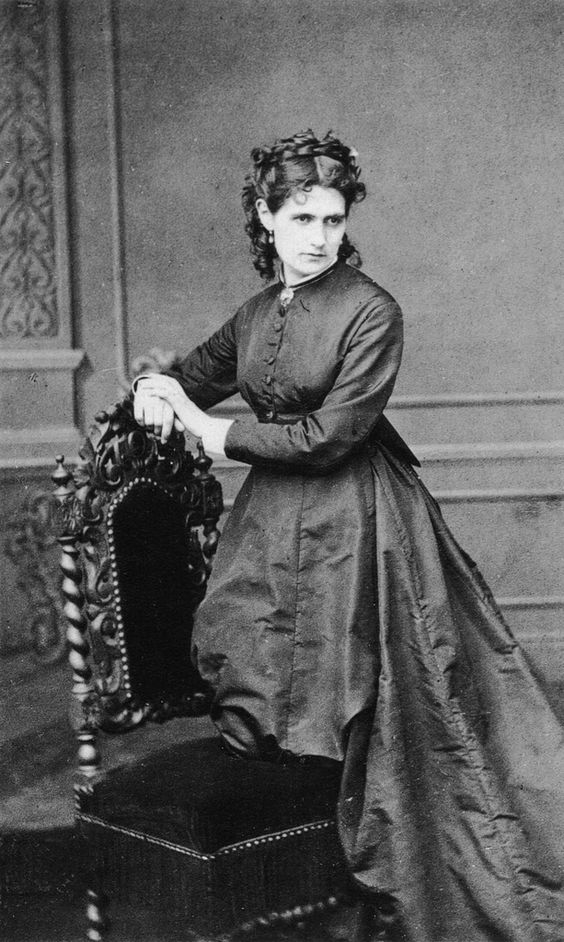
Berthe Morisot

- March 2 – Berthe Morisot, French painter (b. 1841)
- March 3 – Geoffrey Hornby, British admiral (b. 1825)
- March 9 – Leopold von Sacher-Masoch, Austrian writer for whom the word masochism is named (b. 1836)
- March 10 – Charles Frederick Worth, English-born couturier (b. 1825)
- March 13 – Louise Otto-Peters, German women's rights movement activist (b. 1819)
- March 30 – Beauchamp Seymour, British admiral (b. 1821)
- April 17 – Jorge Isaacs, Colombian writer, politician and explorer (b. 1837)
- April 25 – Emily Thornton Charles, American newspaper founder (b. 1845)

=== May–June ===
- May 19 – José Martí, Cuban independence leader (b. 1853)
- May 21 – Franz von Suppé, Austrian composer (b. 1819)
- May 23 – Franz Ernst Neumann, German mineralogist, physicist and mathematician (b. 1798)
- May 26 – Ahmed Cevdet Pasha, Ottoman statesman (b. 1822)
- May 28 – Walter Q. Gresham, American politician (b. 1832)
- May 30 – Joseph Marello, Italian Roman Catholic prelate (b. 1844)
- June 2 – Zeng Laishun, Chinese interpreter and educator (b. 1826)
- June 4 – Abu Bakar of Johor, Malaysian sultan (b. 1833)
- June 6 – Gustaf Nordenskiöld, Swedish explorer (b. 1868)
- June 13 – Manuel Ruiz Zorrilla, Prime Minister of Spain (b. 1833)
- June 27 – Sophie Adlersparre, Swedish feminist and magazine editor (b. 1823)
- June 29
  - Thomas Henry Huxley, English evolutionary biologist (b. 1825)
  - Green Clay Smith, American politician (b. 1826)
  - Floriano Vieira Peixoto, 2nd president of Brazil (b. 1839)
  - Émile Munier, French artist (b. 1840)

=== July–August ===
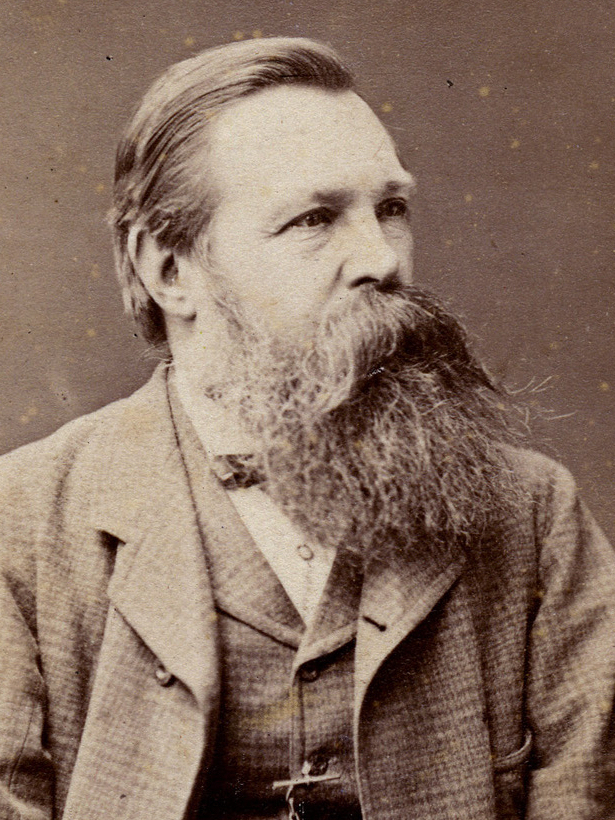
Friedrich Engels

- July 18 – Stefan Stambolov, 9th Prime Minister of Bulgaria (assassinated) (b. 1854)
- July 28 – Edward Beecher, American theologian (b. 1803)
- August 4 – Louis-Antoine Dessaulles, Quebec journalist, politician (b. 1818)
- August 5 – Friedrich Engels, German communist philosopher (b. 1820)
- August 8 – Howell Edmunds Jackson, American Supreme Court Justice (b. 1832)
- August 22 – Luzon B. Morris, American politician (b. 1827)
- August 26 – Friedrich Miescher, Swiss physician and biologist (b. 1844)

=== September–October ===
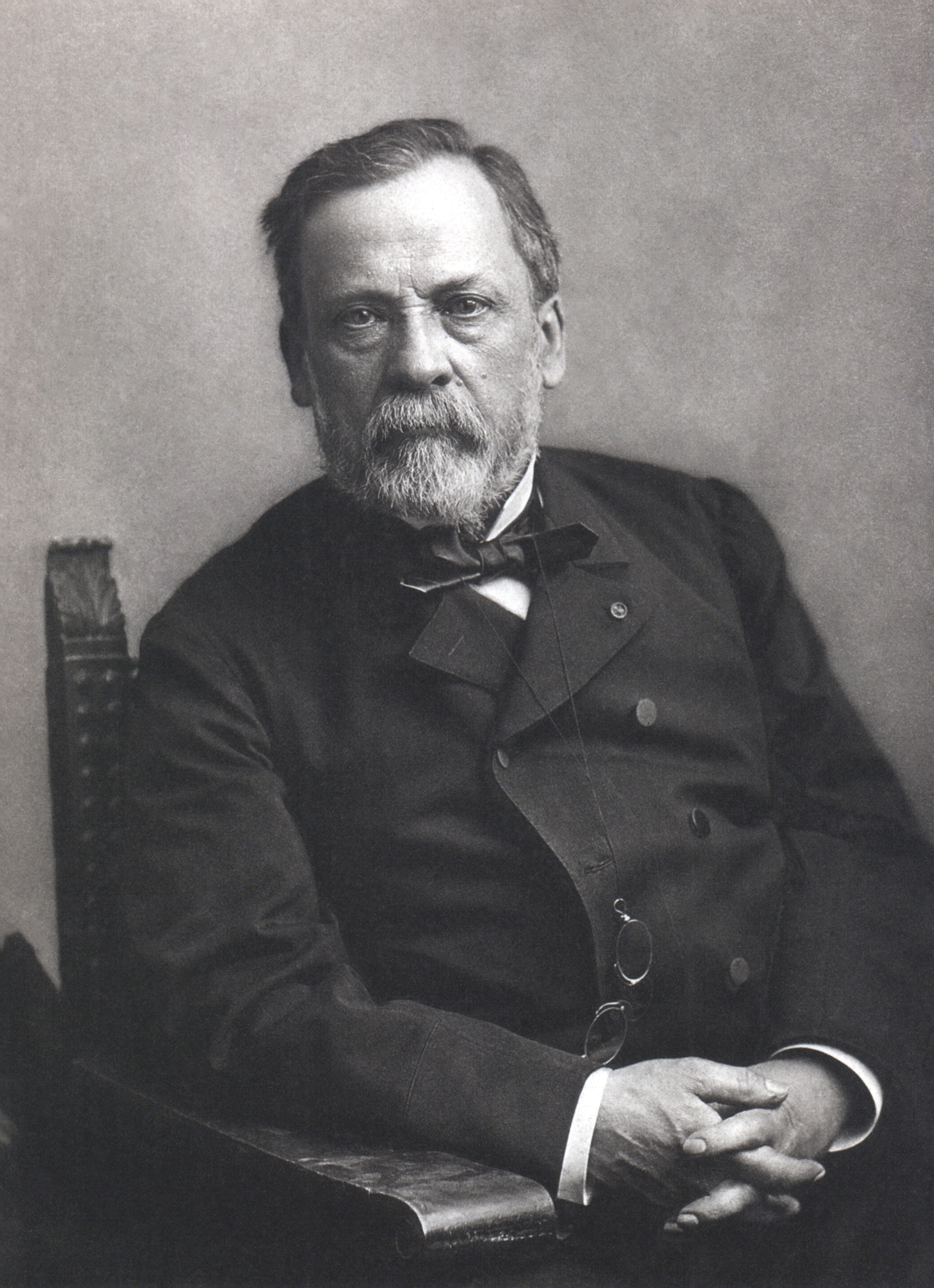
Louis Pasteur

- September 8 – Adam Opel, German founder of the automobile company Adam Opel AG (b. 1837)
- September 26 – Ephraim Wales Bull, American horticulturalist, creator of the Concord grape (b. 1806)
- September 28 – Louis Pasteur, French microbiologist, chemist (b. 1822)
- October 3 – Harry Wright, English-born American baseball pioneer (b. 1835)
- October 8 – Empress Myeongseong (Queen Min), last Korean empress (assassinated) (b. 1851)
- October 13 – Franklin Leonard Pope, American engineer, explorer and inventor (b. 1840)
- October 25 – Sir Charles Hallé, German-born pianist and conductor (b. 1819)
- October 27/28 – Adele Spitzeder, German actress, folk singer and confidence trickster (b. 1832)

=== November–December ===
- November 5 – Prince Kitashirakawa Yoshihisa of Japan (b. 1847)
- November 6 – Adelia Cleopatra Graves, American educator (b. 1821)
- November 23 – Mauritz de Haas, Dutch-American marine painter (b. 1832)
- November 24 – Ludwik Teichmann, Polish anatomist (b. 1823)
- November 27 – Alexandre Dumas, fils, French novelist and playwright (b. 1824)
- December 12 – Allen G. Thurman, American politician (b. 1813)
- December 13 – Ányos Jedlik, Hungarian physicist, inventor of the dynamo (b. 1800)
- December 27 – Eivind Astrup, Norwegian Arctic explorer (b. 1871)

=== Date unknown ===
- Giorgio Mignaty, Italian-Greek painter (b. 1824)
- Edward Jones, British trespasser who died c. 1895 (b. 1824)

== Sources ==
- Appletons' Annual Cyclopaedia and Register of Important Events of the Year 1895: Embracing Political, Military, and Ecclesiastical Affairs; Public Documents; Biography, Statistics, Commerce, Finance, Literature, Science, Agriculture, and Mechanical Industry (1896); highly detailed compilation of facts and primary documents; worldwide coverage. not online.
