= Marguerite Williams =

American geologist

- Born: Marguerite Thomas; December 24, 1895
- Died: August 17, 1991 (aged 95)
- Education: Howard University; Catholic University of America; Columbia University
- Known for: first African American to earn a doctorate in geology in the US
- Scientific career
- Fields: Geology
- Workplaces: Howard University; University of the District of Columbia
- Thesis: The History of Erosion in the Anacostia Drainage Basin
- Doctoral advisor: Arthur R. Barwick

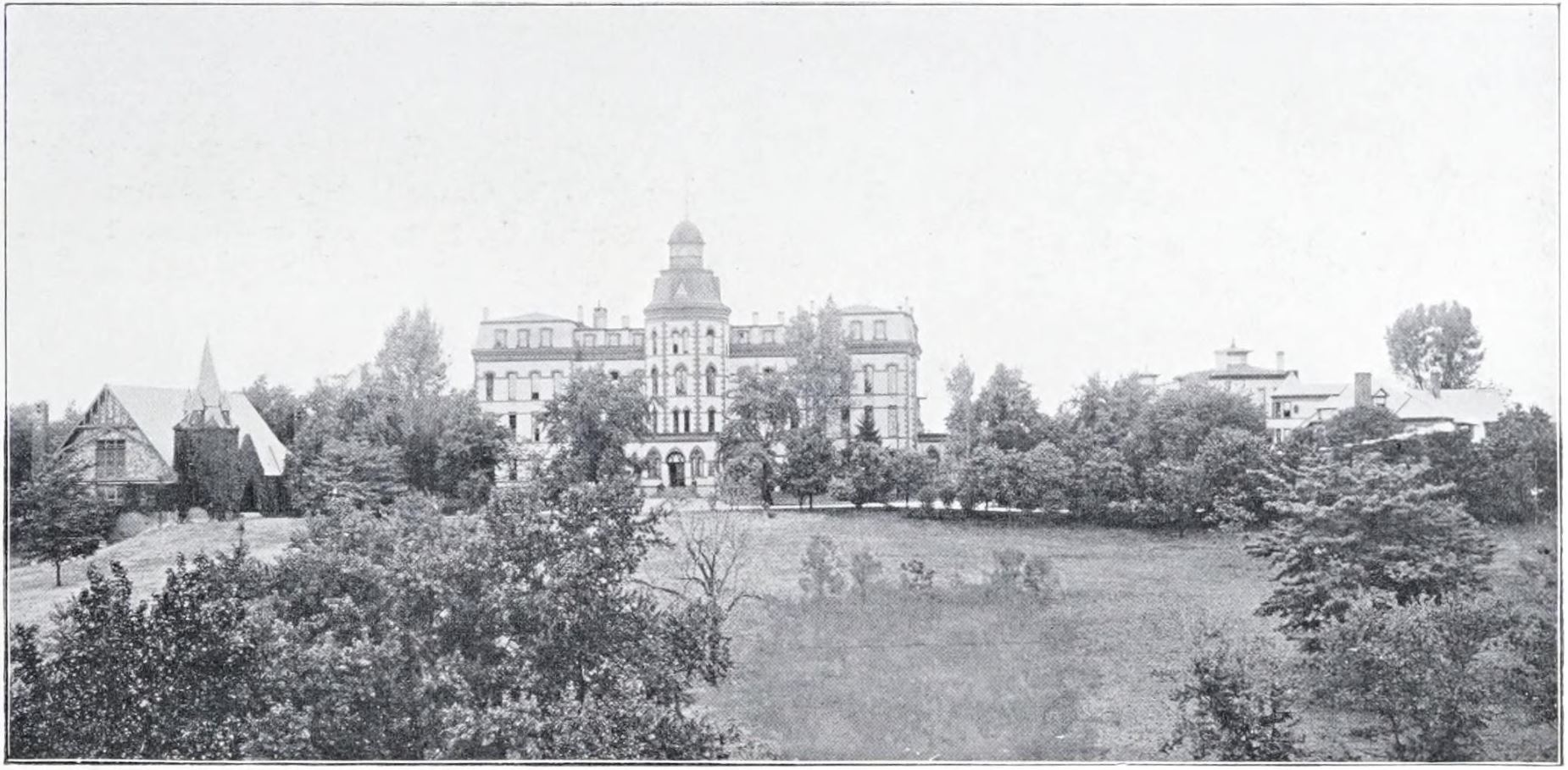

Marguerite Thomas Williams (born Marguerite Thomas; December 24, 1895 – August 17, 1991) was an American geologist. She was the first African American to earn a doctorate in geology in the United States and dedicated most of her career to teaching geography and social sciences. Williams is a pioneer among geoscientists in recognizing how human activity and landscape management impact erosional processes and the risks of natural flooding.

== Personal life and Childhood ==
Marguerite Thomas was the last of six children born to Henry C. and Clara E. Thomas and was raised near Washington D.C. Thomas’ interest in nature, geology, and geography began when she was a young child. After graduating from Columbia University, Thomas married Otis James Williams, D.D.S., and took his surname.

== Education (Schools and such) ==
Marguerite Thomas attended what was previously known as Normal School for Colored Girls. The school was later renamed Miner Teachers College and is now known as the University of the District of Columbia. She graduated from the two-year teacher-training program at the University of the District of Columbia, in June 1916 with a scholarship to Howard University. Kelly Miller of Howard University delivered the address to the graduates and a song, written by Thomas for the occasion, was sung. She went on to earn a Bachelor of Arts degree from Howard University in 1923 where she was mentored by African American biologist Ernest Everett Just. During this time Ernest Just chose Roger Arliner Young, instead of Thomas for a position as an assistant professor at Howard University, despite Thomas being better qualified for the position. Thomas completed her master's degree in geology at Columbia University in 1930.

In 1942, she completed her PhD dissertation, The History of Erosion in the Anacostia Drainage Basin, at Catholic University of America in Washington, D.C. This made her the first African American to earn a doctorate in geology in the United States. Her dissertation was later published by the Catholic University of America Press.

== Dissertation ==
In her dissertation, Williams sought to explore the factors that eventually lead to the erosion observed in the Anacostia River. Little had been done in terms of examining the upper and lower regions of the river and the basin sedimentation. The flooding of Bladensburg, Maryland precipitated the erosion and necessitated investigation. She concluded that, in addition to natural erosion, human activities, including deforestation, agriculture and urbanization, accelerated the process. When the Industrial Revolution occurred, an abundance of trees offered a ready source of fuel, leading to mass deforestation in the regions surrounding the Anacostia River. Due to European settlement and agricultural processes that necessitated a mass deforestation of these trees, human activity was seen as the primary reason for the erosion which occurred in the Anacostia River. Marguerite’s assessment on the ways human activity leads to major environmental setbacks further denotes her significance in the geoscientific fields. As a result, she is considered to be one of the first scientists who scrutinized the impacts that humans have in deterring natural processes observed in the world.

== Career ==
Between the years 1946 and 1947, out of all of the 11,000 employed scientists in the field of geology (in the US) , only 3% were female. As a black woman, Marguerite Williams faced obstacles unique to other women. These obstacles increased after she was married and turned forty. Women in these categories were often employed at levels far beneath their training or skill level. Women pursuing advancements in science experience a lack of mentoring, struggle to gain respect and credibility from peers and administrators, are burdened to act as caregivers to their families, face overt discrimination, and encounter harassment/sexual harassment. African American women enrolled in doctoral programs have a high rate of isolation, lack of guidance and support from the faculty, and few opportunities to advance professionally. While earning her bachelor's degree, Willams worked as an elementary school teacher. After finishing her degree, she returned to the University of the District of Columbia to teach as an assistant professor, teaching geography, and work with the school's theater group, where she unified students of diverse age groups and grades to inspire a collective sense of belonging among them. She worked as an advocate who aimed to promote a more inclusive environment by encouraging the black students in this school to engage in more communal work. After gaining her PhD in 1942, she was promoted to full professor at the University of the District of Columbia. For a decade, from 1923 to 1933, she was Chair of the Division of Geography at the University of the District of Columbia. Once Williams was promoted to full professor, she began teaching night classes at Howard University while continuing her position at the University of the District of Columbia. Williams spent most of her career teaching courses on geology and the social sciences. She finally retired in 1955.

== Legacy ==
Since 2020, the Marguerite T. Williams Award has been presented annually by the American Geophysical Union to mid-career scientists who have significantly contributed to the research or community building in earth and planetary surface processes studies. The research done by Williams on fluvial sedimentology has impacted studies of fluvial sediments on Mars by the Mars Science Laboratory and the Perseverance rover. Her contributions in geology inspired the development of the Marguerite Microtunnel Boring Machine (MTBM). The University College London Department of Earth Sciences, introduced a scholarship under Marguerite’s name for students who have successfully published works that invoke actions or proposed methods to counter discrimination and racism in their institution. She obtained a recognition and written account in the Association for Women in Science (AWIS). The world will continue to admire and idolize her in the near future!

== See also ==
- Timeline of women in science
