= Diego Mazquiarán =

Spanish Matador

Fortuna
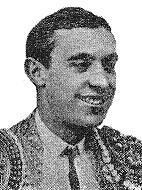
- Mazquiarán
- Born: Diego Mazquiarán; February 19, 1895; Sestao, Vizcaya, Spain
- Died: May 19, 1940 (aged 45); Lima, Peru
- Awards: Cruz de Beneficencia

Diego Mazquiarán (February 19, 1895, in Sestao, Vizcaya, Spain – May 19, 1940, in Lima, Peru), often called simply Fortuna, was a Spanish matador.

== Career ==
Mazquiarán was made a full matador on September 17, 1916, by Rafael Gómez in Madrid, Spain.

On January 22, 1928, a bull escaped from its corral in Madrid, Spain. The bull roamed the city for three hours, injuring eleven and killing one. Mazquiarán and his wife encountered the bull on the Gran Vía, which prompted Mazquiarán to send his wife back home to retrieve his sword while he used his overcoat as if it were a cape to pass the bull. When his wife returned with his sword, Mazquiarán killed the bull with a single thrust. The crowd that gathered awarded Mazquiarán both of the bull's ears for his performance.^{[a]} For his actions Mazquiarán was awarded the Cruz de Beneficencia.

Mazquiarán was the first matador to fight in the newly constructed Madrid bullring when he killed the bull "Hortelano" on June 17, 1931.

Mazquiarán's mental health deteriorated as he aged, and he died May 19, 1940, in a mental hospital in Lima, Peru.

=== Critical response ===
Ernest Hemingway said of Mazquiarán in Death in the Afternoon that he was "...a great killer...", but that he had no variety and knew "...only one way to work with a bull." Hemingway also noted that Mazquiarán was one of the few matadors who attended bullfights that he was not performing in.

Barnaby Conrad said of Mazquiarán that his volapiés^{[b]} were among the best ever performed.

== Footnotes ==
- ^{a} One ear, both ears, or even both ears and tail are awarded by the crowd during a bullfight to matadors who give an outstanding performance.
- ^{b} Literally meaning "with flying feet", it is a kill in which the matador runs at the bull, instead of letting the bull charge him.

== Bibliography ==
- Conrad, Barnaby (1961). Barnaby Conrad's Encyclopedia of Bullfighting. Boston, Massachusetts: Houghton Mifflin. OCLC 33466783.
- Hemingway, Ernest (2003) [First Copyrighted 1932]. Death in the Afternoon (1st Scribner trade pbk. ed.). New York, New York: Charles Scribner's Sons. ISBN 978-0-684-80145-2. OCLC 53453017.
