= 1895 Yaroslavl Great Manufacture strike =

- Part of mass political and social unrest in the late Russian Empire
- Date: 9 May [O.S. 27 April] 1895
- Location: Yaroslavl
- Caused by: Fines, reduction of salaries
- Goals: To resolve economic and social issues, increase salaries, reduce fines
- Methods: Strike action, arson, assault

The 1895 Yaroslavl Great Manufacture strike began in 9 May [O.S. 27 April] 1895, in the Yaroslavl region of the Russian Empire. There were several strikes across the empire in 1895, in protest of decreasing wages.

== Background ==
Yaroslavl Great Manufacture was one of the biggest companies in Russia, out of about 70 in the city of Yaroslavl; it exported its linens to Europe. The company decided to establish new tariffs to reduce salaries, a decision which was not welcomed between workers. According to Vladimir Lenin, a series of strikes took place in the Moscow, Vladimir, and Yaroslavl gubernias to protest similar fines imposed on them. These fines were imposed to establish discipline (for example, a fine for smoking). Factory owners could impose fines to the extent they wished and fines were imposed at the employers discretion.

== The Strike ==
4,000 workers participated in the strike. The worker's ceased their work and proceeded to damage the factory premises and machinery, sometimes setting fire to them and assaulting managerial staff. In response, a division of soldiers broke up their meeting, killing thirteen men. Tsar Nicholas II, in a telegram about the official report, commented: "I am very satisfied with the way the troops behaved at Yaroslavl during these factory uprisings".

== Outcome ==
In June 1896, fine laws were introduced to outline in what cases fines could be imposed, established maximum fines, and mandated that the collected fines be used to benefit the workers rather than increase employer profit.

The strike had consequences for the workers, many of whom were arrested and others were dismissed from the enterprise. The factory administration was also affected, Fedorov and Shchapov could not justify themselves to the board of the partnership. And at the end of the strike, A.F. Gryaznov was appointed deputy director of the factory in place of Shchapov, who left service. Fedorov held the directorship until his contract expired in 1898.
