= Giorgio Mignaty =

Italian-Greek painter

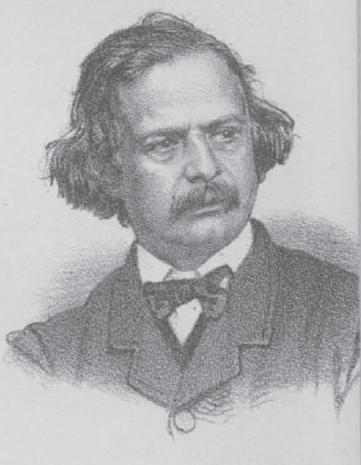
Giorgio Mignaty

Giorgio Mignaty (Cephalonia, June 23, 1824 – March 9, 1895 Florence) was an Italian-Greek painter.

== Biography ==
He studied in Rome under Tommaso Minardi and Ferdinando Silvani, and lived for many years in Florence, where he painted many sacred and historic subjects. Among his works is a large canvases: Markos Botsaris (1864); La vittoria dei patriota di Suli contro i Turchi (1879); An episode of the Inquisition of Spain; and La prima onda (First Wave) that depicts God separating water from chaos. He was also known for genre portraits of Hellenic and Ottoman subjects. He was named Knight of the Order of the Savior of Greece and of the Order of the Crown of Italy. One of his pupils was Elizabeth Otis Lyman Duveneck. Mignaty painted the drawing room of Casa Guidi in Florence, the house of Robert and Elizabeth Barrett Browning.
