= Marianne Golz =

Austrian opera singer

Marianne Golz-Goldlust
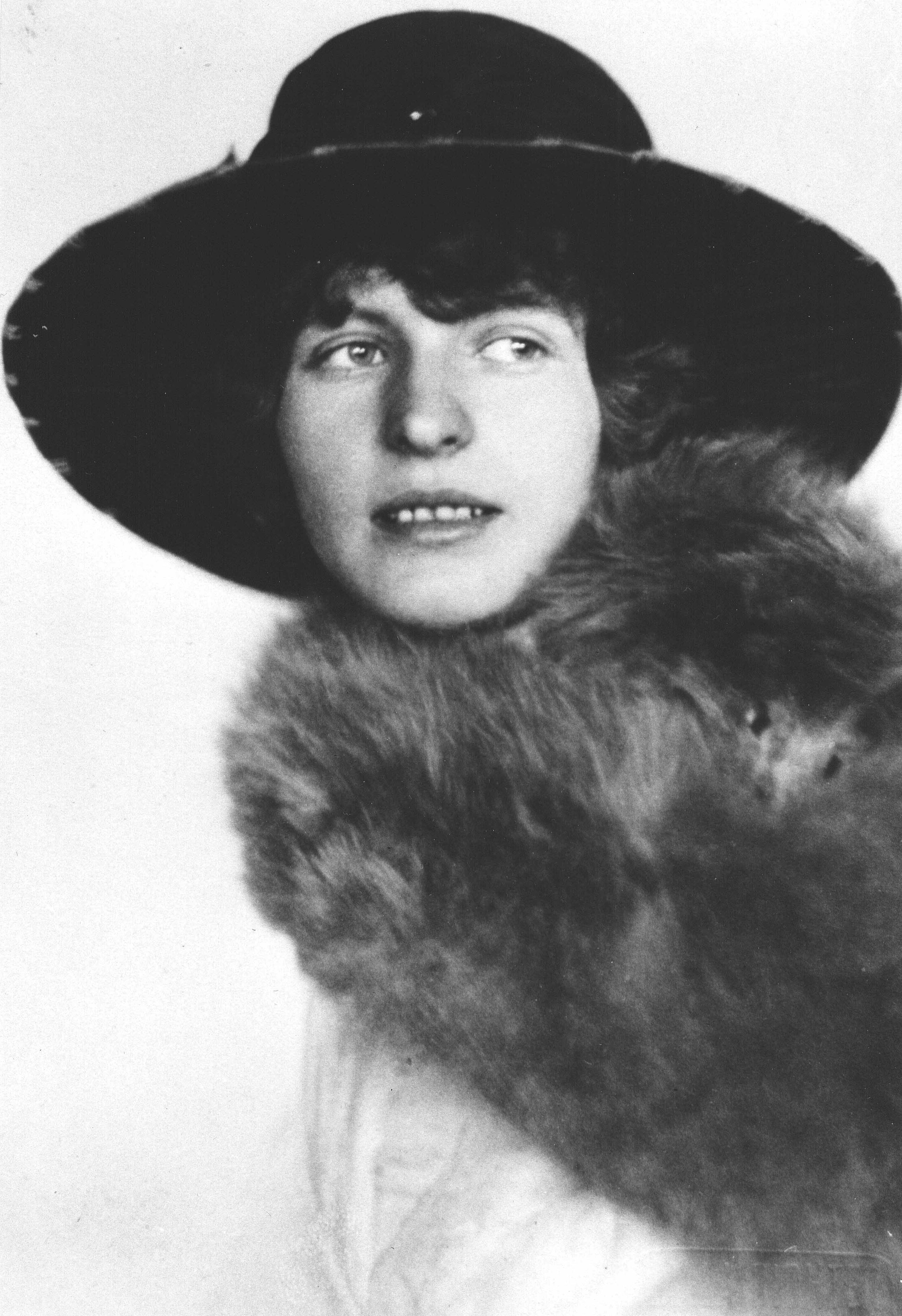
- Born: Maria Agnes Belokosztolszky; 30 January 1895; Vienna, Austria-Hungary
- Died: 8 October 1943 (aged 48); Prague, Protectorate of Bohemia and Moravia
- Cause of death: Execution by guillotine
- Occupations: Opera singer, actress
- Known for: Rescuing Jewish refugees during the Holocaust
- Honours: Righteous Among the Nations

Marianne Golz-Goldlust (née Belokosztolszky; 30 January 1895 – 8 October 1943) was an Austrian-born opera singer and actress. She maintained a successful career in eastern Europe during the early 1920s, later moving to Prague, Czechoslovakia, and becoming a theatre critic. She married Jewish journalist Hans Goldlust in 1929. When Hans was arrested by Nazis in 1939, Golz-Goldlust secured his release, helping him and his other relatives escape to England. She stayed in Prague to help the Resistance, a dangerous task which she accomplished by hiding Jewish refugees, smuggling financial resources and information across borders, recruiting new resistance members, and holding resistance meetings at her home.

After she and several other resistance members were arrested by Nazis in 1942, Golz-Goldlust confessed to her part in the resistance and claimed her associates were innocent, successfully securing their release. Her family's legal attempts to have Golz-Goldlust freed were ultimately unsuccessful. In May 1943, she was sentenced to death by the Nazis, and was executed by guillotine in October of that year.

Golz-Goldlust's personal letters were compiled and published in book-form after the war, and her story became further popularized via articles, radio broadcasts, and a stage play. In 1988, Golz-Goldlust was recognized posthumously as Righteous Among the Nations.

== Biography ==
=== Early life and career ===
Maria Agnes Belokosztolszky was born to a Catholic family on 30 January 1895 in Vienna, Austria. Her mother was Czech, while her father was Polish. She had a sister named Rosi. After high school, Belokosztolsky trained as an opera singer and ballet dancer. She took on the stage name Marianne Tolska. Throughout the early 1920s, she appeared in performances in Linz, Stuttgart and Salzburg City, working with Austrian composer Nico Dostal and singing operettas alongside tenor Richard Tauber. During this time, she married and divorced twice.

In 1924, Belokosztolszky moved to Berlin, where she met Jewish editor and journalist Hans Goldlust. The two married in 1929. Hans had informally adopted the surname 'Golz' to avoid social stigma surrounding traditionally Jewish-sounding names in Germany, so when Marianne married him she adopted the surname Golz-Goldlust. The couple moved to Prague in 1934, and Golz-Goldlust put her skills to work as a theatre critic.

=== Resistance work ===
When the Nazis invaded Prague in 1939, Hans was arrested. Golz-Goldlust successfully got him released, helping him escape to England. She also helped Hans' mother and sister escape the country. Instead of joining them in safety, Golz-Goldlust decided to stay in Prague to help other persecuted Jews. She began holding social gatherings at her house to find like-minded citizens, and she soon met local resistance organizer Ottokar Zapotecky, whose network helped smuggle refugees out of Prague. Golz-Goldlust recruited new resistance members from Czechoslovakia and Austria, assisting Jewish refugees in their escape by putting them in touch with the network and moving financial resources across borders. She hid refugees in her home, continued to hold resistance meetings, and arranged to smuggle important information about Prague conditions to the exiled Czech government over in England.

=== Death and legacy ===
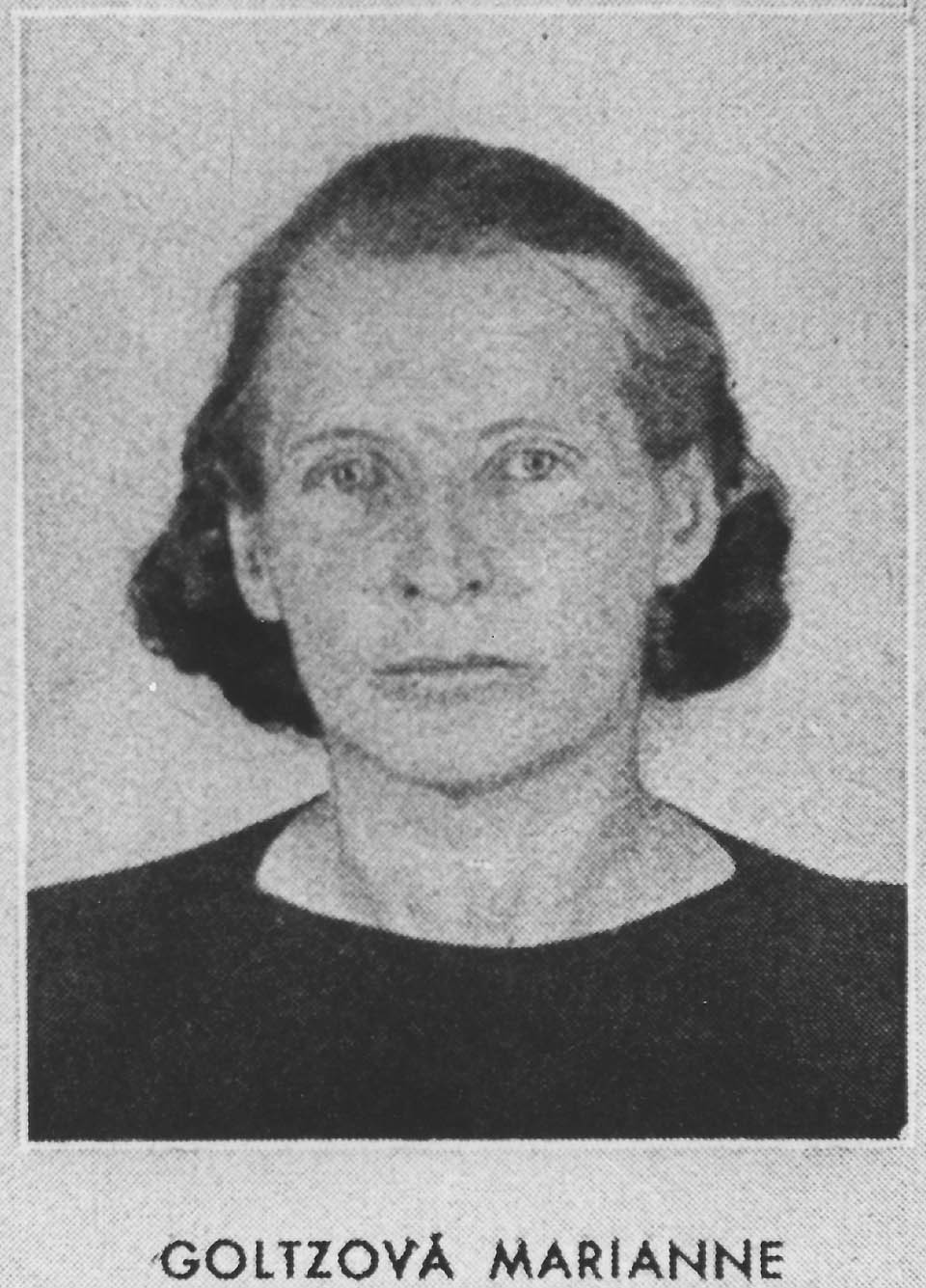
A prison photo of Golz-Goldlust

On 19 November 1942, Golz-Goldlust and several of her resistance associates were arrested by the Nazis. Golz-Goldlust confessed immediately, telling her interrogators that she was the only resistance member in the group, and her associates were consequently allowed to go free. Golz-Goldlust was held in Pankrác Prison. Despite her captivity, however, she continued to write a steady stream of letters to friends and contacts; the letters were written on paper scraps and smuggled out of prison whenever she had meals brought to her.

Although Golz-Goldlust's family pursued legal means to have her freed, most lawyers were unwilling to risk the wrath of German authorities by arguing in her defense. Czech lawyer Marie Schrámek finally agreed to take the case, but was ultimately unable to free Golz-Goldlust, despite an appeal to the Special German High Court and to the Reich Minister of Justice. In May 1943, Golz-Goldlust was sentenced to death for her actions, and she was guillotined on 8 October 1943.

In 1946, Golz-Goldlust's letters were compiled and published as a book titled Zaluji (I Accuse), and later in German translation as Der Große Tag (The Great Day). Her story was eventually featured in radio broadcasts, articles, and a play. In June 1988, Golz-Goldlust was formally recognized posthumously by Yad Vashem as Righteous Among the Nations for her work rescuing Jewish refugees. An olive tree was planted in her honour at the Yad Vashem Memorial Centre in Israel.

In 2011, the German Resistance Memorial Centre held a special exhibition focused on Golz-Goldlust's life.
