= Federation of Chiropractic Licensing Boards =

- Abbreviation: FCLB
- Predecessor: International Congress of Chiropractic Examining Boards
- Formation: 1926 (ICCEB); 1974 (FCLB)
- Purpose: Non-profit advisory board
- Headquarters: Greeley, Colorado
- Location(s): 5401 W. 10th Street; Suite 101
- Coordinates: 40.421680°N 104.771243°W
- President: Karlos Boghosian, DC
- Affiliations: NBCE, CCE
- Revenue: $900,529 (2016)
- Expenses: $695,872 (2016)
- Website: www.fclb.org

The Federation of Chiropractic Licensing Boards, based in Greeley, Colorado, is a non-profit organization which facilitates the coordination and communication of the 50 individual United States' chiropractic licensing boards.

== History ==
The earliest ancestor of the FCLB was chartered in Memphis in September 1926 as the International Congress of Chiropractic Examining Boards. From this organization, Congress created the Council of State Chiropractic Examining Boards (CSCEB) in 1933. This board was originally associated with the National Chiropractic Association, but by 1947 decided to withdraw itself from the influence of any national association and formed its own independently run organization. Incorporating itself in Wyoming it received federal tax-exempt status in 1968.

By 1974 the name of the organization was changed to its present-day name, the Federation of Chiropractic Licensing Boards. The newly formed FCLB first sought to arbitrate the merger of the Association of Chiropractic Colleges with the Council on Chiropractic Education (CCE) as both were attempting to earn national accreditation from the United States Office of Education. As arbitration drew near the CCE secured accreditation from the U.S. government, and quickly thereafter the FCLB supported its claim on the government petition.

== Mission ==
The mission of the FCLB is to maintain high, uniform standards in areas related to chiropractic licensure, regulation, discipline, and education. The organization provides services to member chiropractic licensing boards to fulfill their statutory obligations and regulate the profession within the interest of public protection.

== Affiliations ==
The Federation of Chiropractic Licensing Boards collaborates closely with the National Board of Chiropractic Examiners (NBCE) and Council on Chiropractic Education (CCE) because of their shared mission of public protection. The FCLB also works closely with the NBCE and to develop uniform standards of education and examination for its national board exams parts 1-4.

A database of providers called CIN-BAD (Chiropractic Information Network - Board Action Database) provides member boards and other subscribers access to information regarding licensed chiropractors in the US, Canada, and Australia. CIN-BAD's databases are significant resources for regulatory boards, chiropractic colleges, managed care providers, law enforcement agencies, and the public.

A service called PACE (Providers of Approved Chiropractic Education) assists the member regulatory boards in validating quality educational courses for licensed chiropractors as well as tracking obtained continuing education credit hours for compliance purposes.

The FCLB also manages a program for Certified Chiropractic Clinical Assistants, which is a certification program for competent office assistants who may legally provide certain limited clinical services in a chiropractic setting. The program establishes minimal testing, training and character standards for chiropractic assistants to best protect the public.

== Membership ==
Members include boards having jurisdiction to license or regulate the practice of chiropractic in the states, provinces, commonwealths, and territories of the United States of America, Australia, Canada, England, Mexico, New Zealand and other jurisdictions.

Current regulatory board members, as well as those who have served on a board within the last five years, may participate as Fellows in FCLB activities, including holding office or serving on standing committees. Those who have ever served on a chiropractic regulatory board are Honorary Fellows, privileged to attend the annual business meeting.
