= Tedd Koren =

- Born: 1950 (age 74–75); Brooklyn, New York
- Occupation: Chiropractor
- Known for: Koren Specific Technique
- Notable work: Koren Publications, Inc.

Tedd Koren (born 1950) is a chiropractor who created the Koren Specific Technique (KST) around 2004. Koren said he originated KST after practicing on himself to relieve his own pain. Koren wrote on his website that "KST is an analysis protocol not a chiropractic technique." He resides in Hatfield, Pennsylvania.

== Biography ==
In 1977, Koren graduated from Sherman College of Chiropractic in Spartanburg, South Carolina. He practiced as a chiropractor in Philadelphia, and during that time helped to found the (now defunct) Pennsylvania College of Chiropractic. Koren publishes brochures under the name Koren Publications, Inc. which is one of the most prolific publishers of chiropractic literature. His publications cover over 60 topics related to chiropractic care, with titles such as Allergies, Asthma & Emphysema, Blood Pressure, and more.

In 1995, Koren was under investigation by the Federal Trade Commission (FTC) after an anonymous complaint for "false and misleading advertising". Koren rewrote a number of his pamphlets as a result of the proposed FTC consent order, given to him in 1997. No charges were pressed and the investigation was subsequently dropped in 2001.

In 2008, the World Federation of Chiropractic (WFC) accused Koren of "serious professional misconduct" by offering seminars in the technique to non-chiropractic practitioners.

Koren believes chiropractic is about more than treating back pain. He believes the chiropractic method of adjusting subluxations may have positive results that range from asthma to premenstrual syndrome according to his pamphlets.
