= NUCCA =

National Upper Cervical Chiropractic Association
- Abbreviation: NUCCA
- Formation: April 16, 1966; 60 years ago
- Founder: Ralph Gregory
- Headquarters: 5353 Wayzata Blvd., Suite 350
- Location: Minneapolis, Minnesota
- Coordinates: 44.969578°N 93.348370°W
- President: Dr. Glenn Cripe
- Vice President: Dr. Kurt Sherwood
- Website: www.nucca.org

NUCCA is an acronym for the National Upper Cervical Chiropractic Association. It was founded in 1966 by chiropractor Ralph Gregory and based primarily upon the work he and John Grostic had performed before Grostic's death in 1964. The new style of upper cervical adjusting technique was taught in 1966 at the first NUCCA seminar, which was held at the Howard Johnson Motel in Monroe, Michigan.

NUCCA is currently taught at 5 chiropractic colleges/universities: Palmer School of Chiropractic, Northwestern Health Sciences University, Sherman College of Chiropractic, Life University and Life Chiropractic College West.

== History ==
When the craniocervical junction (head and neck) is injured, the NUCCA process uses a specific procedure focused on correcting a small misalignment of this area of the neck and head. NUCCA uses a precise, gentle, non-invasive spinal adjusting technique that ultimately relieves interference to the nervous system and restores optimal balance to the entire spinal column.

The NUCCA process brings several generations of clinical research to correcting the Atlas Subluxation Complex.

By using precise and objective x-rays of the head and neck, along with mathematical measurement analysis, NUCCA doctors are able to establish a misalignment pattern unique to every person.

Once the misalignment is understood by the doctor, there is no need for further x-rays because correlating the relationship between posture and upper cervical misalignment allows posture to then be used thereafter to judge alignment.

Additionally, there is often less need for repeated corrections because of the specific x-ray measurements.

== Technique ==
NUCCA focuses on the upper vertebrae in the neck and uses pre and post X-rays to correct misalignments of the upper spine. The method uses double-pivot-point X-ray analysis, the "development of the triceps pull manual adjustment" and "design and development of the Anatometer posture distortion measuring instrument". Unlike other chiropractic techniques, NUCCA does not use manual adjustments and does not involve twisting or popping.

== Literature ==
Upper Cervical Research Foundation

The research branch of NUCCA, the Upper Cervical Research Foundation (UCRF), was established in 1971 and has been studying the link between the NUCCA work, the upper cervical spine and optimal well–being.

The Upper Cervical Monograph

The Monograph was started in March 1973 to share articles of the technical aspects of NUCCA, reports on NUCCA research and chiropractic in general.

NUCCA and Blood Pressure

In 2007 NUCCA published Atlas vertebra realignment and achievement of arterial pressure goal in hypertensive patients: a pilot study. The study design used was randomized, double blind, with a placebo control. The results of the study showed no adverse effects with marked and sustained reductions in blood pressure similar to the use of two blood-pressure medications given in combination.

NUCCA and Migraines

In 2015 NUCCA published a study on migraine sufferers performed at the University of Calgary. The study used a supine phase contrast MRI to track venous and arterial flow in and out of the brain, as well as the fluid dynamics of cerebral spinal fluid.

Subjects were examined by a neurologist and completed baseline migraine-specific outcomes. The presence of atlas misalignment allowed study inclusion, permitting baseline MRI data collection.

The Subject were re-evaluated at 4 and 8 weeks and revealed clinically significant improvement in symptoms with a decrease in headache days.
