= National Board of Chiropractic Examiners =

Regulatory Organization

- Abbreviation: NBCE
- Formation: 1963
- Headquarters: 901 54th Avenue
- Location: Greeley, Colorado
- Coordinates: 40.421973°N 104.772091°W
- President: Daniel Côté, DC
- Revenue: $12,755,128 (2016)
- Expenses: $11,815,759 (2016)
- Website: www.nbce.org

The National Board of Chiropractic Examiners (NBCE) is a non-profit national and international testing organization for the chiropractic profession that develops, administers, analyzes, scores, and reports results from various examinations. Examinations are offered to students at chiropractic colleges accredited by the Council on Chiropractic Education (CCE). The NBCE maintains its headquarters in Greeley, Colorado. The organization was established in 1963 to standardize chiropractic testing requirements as opposed to each state having its own board exam. Since 1963, all but one of states have adopted the passage of Parts I-IV; however, each state has its own licensing requirements in addition to the NBCE exams.

== History ==
Chiropractic made two unsuccessful attempts to create a national board of chiropractic in the early to mid 1900s, and by 1962 Joseph Janse proposed another attempt at creating an agency comparable to those being established by organized medicine, dentistry, and osteopathy. An organizational meeting was held in Detroit, Michigan on July 26, 1962 which was supported by both the International Chiropractors Association and the National Chiropractic Association, and by June 19, 1963 the National Board of Chiropractic Examiners was officially incorporated.

At first, the establishment of this board was met with resistance from individual state-run licensing boards as this was seen as an attempt to override the states' individual authority. However, by 1970 with the help of the Federation of Chiropractic Licensing Boards, a majority of the states recognized the NCBE.

== Examinations ==
The National Board of Chiropractic Examiners provides written and practical examinations that are administered twice yearly at chiropractic colleges in the United States, Canada, France, United Kingdom, Australia, South Korea and New Zealand. The NBCE does not promote a particular philosophy but formulates test plans according to information provided collectively by surveying course content of chiropractic colleges. Input is also provided by state regulatory agencies, field practitioners, and subject specialists. Through a survey called the Practice Analysis of Chiropractic, information gathered about the day-to-day practice patterns of practitioners also serves as a basis for the Part III and Part IV exams.

- Part I covers six basic science subjects – general anatomy, spinal anatomy, physiology, chemistry, pathology, and microbiology. Chiropractic college students typically take this exam in the middle of their respective programs.
- Part II covers six clinical subjects – general diagnosis, neuromusculoskeletal diagnosis, diagnostic imaging, principles of chiropractic, chiropractic practice, and associated clinical sciences. Students typically take this exam around the time they enter the clinical internship phase of their respective programs.
- Part III covers case history, physical examination, neuromusculoskeletal examination, diagnostic imaging examination, clinical laboratory and special studies, diagnosis or clinical impression, chiropractic techniques, supportive techniques and case management. This is usually taken when students enter the clinical internship phase of their training. Applicants can only take this exam once they have passed all six sections of Part I as of 2012.
- Part IV covers x-ray interpretation and diagnosis, chiropractic technique, and case management skills. This is taken when students are within 6 months of graduating from their respective programs and are in their clinical phase either near the end of the program or just about to graduate from their respective college. Applicants can only take this exam once they have passed all six sections of Part I as of 2012.

The NBCE also administers tests in two electives: physiotherapy (PT) and acupuncture. The physiotherapy examination can be taken upon completion of 120 hours of PT course work through a chiropractic college program. The acupuncture examination is now computerized and can be taken upon completion of 100 hours of acupuncture course work through a chiropractic college or other accredited program. The acupuncture examination is only offered six times a year, since being computerized.

== Passing scores ==
The minimal passing score for all NBCE exams is 375/800. For parts I and II a passing score of 4 out of 6 sectional tests to ensure the applicant has passed the examination as a whole. However, to be licensed full an applicant will need to pass all 6 sections before they are able to practice.

== Post-licensure examinations ==
The NBCE administers two tests for post-licensure purposes.

- Special Purposes Examination for Chiropractic (SPEC): This computerized exam is to re-assess clinical competency and licensing eligibility in cases involving disciplinary action, reciprocity, and other state board needs.
- NBCE Ethics and Boundaries Examination (NBCE E&B): This is a computerized essay examination to assess the knowledge of ethics and boundaries issues, including ethical misconduct, sexual misconduct and sexual harassment, which may be encountered in chiropractic practice.

== Board of directors ==
There are 11 board members. Five directors are elected from each of five U.S. geographic regions. These district directors serve a term of three years. Four directors are elected by the board to serve two-year, at-large terms. Two directors are appointed by the Federation of Chiropractic Licensing Boards. The board elects an executive committee of officers to fill the positions of president, vice president, treasurer, and secretary.
