= Chiropractic treatment techniques =

Chiropractors use their version of spinal manipulation (known as chiropractic adjustment) as their primary treatment method, with non-chiropractic use of spinal manipulation gaining more study and attention in mainstream medicine in the 1980s. There is no evidence that chiropractic spinal adjustments are effective for any medical condition, with the possible exception of treatment for lower back pain. The safety of manipulation, particularly on the cervical spine, has been debated. Adverse results, including strokes and deaths, are rare.

There are about 200 plus chiropractic techniques, most of which are variations of spinal manipulation, but there is a significant amount of overlap between them, and many techniques involve slight changes of other techniques.

According to the American Chiropractic Association the most frequently used techniques by chiropractors are Diversified technique 95.9%, Extremity manipulating/adjusting 95.5%, Activator Methods 62.8%, Gonstead technique 58.5%, Cox Flexion/Distraction 58.0%, Thompson 55.9%, Sacro Occipital Technique [SOT] 41.3%, Applied Kinesiology 43.2%, NIMMO/Receptor Tonus 40.0%, Cranial 37.3%, Manipulative/Adjustive Instruments 34.5%, Palmer upper cervical [HIO] 28.8%, Logan Basic 28.7%, Meric 19.9%, and Pierce-Stillwagon 17.1%.

== Techniques ==
=== Manual and manipulative therapy ===
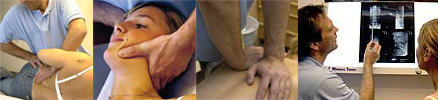
Lumbar, cervical and thoracic chiropractic spinal manipulation

In the late 19th century in North America, therapies including osteopathy and chiropractic became popular. Spinal manipulation gained mainstream recognition during the 1980s.

In this system, hands are used to manipulate, massage or otherwise influence the spine and related tissues. It is the most common and primary intervention used in chiropractic care.

=== Diversified technique ===
Diversified technique is a non-proprietary and eclectic approach to spinal manipulation that is commonly used by chiropractors. The technique, as it is applied today, is largely attributed to the work of Joe Janse Diversified is the most common spine manipulation technique used by chiropractors, with approximately 96% of chiropractors using it for approximately 70% of their patients. Diversified is also the technique most preferred for use during future practice by chiropractic students. Diversified is the only spine manipulation technique taught in Canadian chiropractic programs. Like many chiropractic and osteopathic manipulative techniques, Diversified is characterized by a high-velocity, low-amplitude thrust. It is considered the most generic chiropractic manipulative technique and is differentiated from other techniques in that its objective is to restore proper movement and alignment of spine and joint dysfunction.

=== Atlas orthogonal technique ===
Atlas Orthogonal Technique is an upper cervical chiropractic treatment technique created by Frederick M. Vogel and Roy W. Sweat in 1979. It is a non-invasive technique that uses a percussion "Atlas Orthogonal instrument" in attempts to change ("adjust") the position of the atlas. Using angles measured from specific X-rays, claims are made that vertebral subluxations are found and must be corrected. It is based on the teachings of B. J. Palmer, who advocated the Hole-In-One version of spinal adjustment. Upper Cervical chiropractors focus on correcting the alignment of the atlas to allow for minimal obstruction for the nerves channeled through the atlas and down the spinal cord. Referring to the origins of upper cervical techniques, Dan Murphy, DC, DABCO, wrote: "Over the past 100 years, the practice of chiropractic has branched into dozens of specialty techniques. However, historically, for a third of this time, from the 1930s into the 1960s, the predominant practice of chiropractic involved primarily the upper cervical spine."

=== Activator methods ===
The Activator Method Chiropractic Technique (AMCT) is a chiropractic treatment method and device created by Arlan Fuhr as an alternative to manual manipulation of the spine or extremity joints. The device is categorized as a mechanical force manual assisted (MFMA) instrument, which is generally regarded as a softer chiropractic treatment technique.

The activator is a small handheld spring-loaded instrument that delivers a small impulse to the spine. It was found to give off no more than 0.3 J of kinetic energy in a 3-millisecond pulse. The aim is to produce enough force to move the vertebrae but not enough to cause injury.

The AMCT involves having the patient lie in a prone position and comparing the functional leg lengths. Often one leg will seem to be shorter than the other. The chiropractor then carries out a series of muscle tests, such as having the patient move their arms in a certain position to activate the muscles attached to specific vertebrae. If the leg lengths are not the same, that is taken as a sign that the problem is located at that vertebra. The chiropractor treats problems found in this way, moving progressively along the spine in the direction from the feet towards the head.

Although prone "functional leg length" is a widely used chiropractic tool, it is not a recognized anthropometric technique, since legs are often of unequal length, and measurements in the prone position are not entirely valid estimates of standing X-ray differences. Measurements in the standing position are far more reliable. Another confounding factor is that simply moving the two legs held together and leaning them imperceptibly to one side or the other produces different results. Fuhr claims that properly trained doctors show good interexaminer reliability.

In 2003, the National Board of Chiropractic Examiners found that 69.9% of chiropractors used the technique, and 23.9% of patients received it. The majority of U.S. chiropractic schools and some schools in other countries teach the AMCT method, and an estimated 45,000 chiropractors worldwide use AMCT or some part of the technique.

There have been many studies of AMCT, including case reports, clinical studies, and controlled trials, but there are still unanswered questions. A few low-quality studies have suggested that the activator may be as effective as manual adjustment in the treatment of back pain. A single high-quality study has suggested that activator-assisted manipulation directed by leg-length testing was significantly inferior to manual spinal manipulation guided by palpation and was more similar to the use of paracetamol for the treatment of low back pain.

=== Graston technique ===
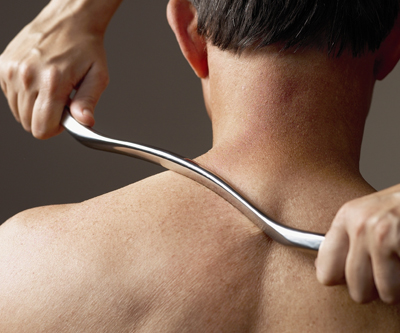

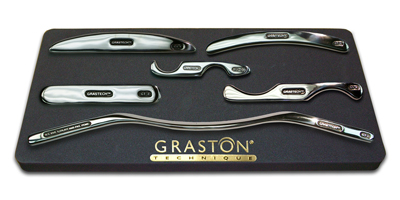

Graston Technique (GT) is a trademarked therapeutic method for diagnosing and treating disorders of the skeletal muscles and related connective tissue. The method was started by David Graston and employs a collection of six stainless steel instruments of particular shape and size, which are used by practitioners to rub patients' muscles in order to detect and resolve adhesions in the muscles and tendons. Practitioners must be licensed by the parent corporation (Graston Technique, LLC.) in order to use the Graston Technique trademark or the patented instruments.

Several examples of Graston treatment have been used in contact sports where scars and contusions are common. However, the Graston Technique has not been rigorously scientifically tested and its evidence basis and assumptions are considered questionable at best. There are no high quality clinical trials that validate the efficacy of the Graston Techniques.

=== Koren Specific Technique ===
Koren specific technique (KST) is a technique developed by Tedd Koren around 2004. While the technique is associated with chiropractic techniques, Koren has variously described it as an "analysis protocol" or "healthcare protocol". KST may use their hands, or they may use an electric device known as an "ArthroStim" for assessment and adjustments. KST can use different postures. The insurers Aetna, NHS Leeds West CCG, North Dakota Department of Human Services, and The Ohio State University cover other chiropractic techniques but exclude KST from coverage because they consider it to be "experimental and investigational." Aetna's policy states there is a lack of efficacy regarding this method.

=== Gonstead technique ===
The Gonstead technique is a chiropractic method developed by Clarence Gonstead in 1923. The technique focuses on hands-on adjustment and is claimed to expand "standard diversified technique" by removing rotation from the adjusting thrust and implementing additional instrumentation including X-rays, Gonstead Radiographic Parallel, a measuring device to undertake specific biomechanical analysis of the X-ray, and the development of Nervo-Scope, a device said to detect the level of neurophysiologic activity due to the existence of vertebral subluxation based on changes in skin temperature. Heat detector devices are unreliable and lack scientific evidence. The technique gained popularity in the 1960s. About 28.9% of patients have been treated with the Gonstead technique.

=== Trigenics Technique ===
Trigenics is a neurological-based manual or instrument-assisted assessment and treatment system developed and patented by Allan Oolo Austin. The technique is relatively infrequently used by chiropractors compared to other chiropractic techniques such as Diversified, trigger point therapy and Activator.

== Effectiveness ==
=== Neuromusculoskeletal disorders ===
Treatment is usually for neck or low back pain and related disorders.

For acute low back pain, low quality evidence has suggested no difference between real and sham spine manipulation, and moderate quality evidence has suggested no difference between spine manipulation and other commonly used treatments, such as medication and physical therapy.

National guidelines vary; some recommend the therapy for those who do not improve with other treatment. It may be effective for lumbar disc herniation with radiculopathy, as effective as mobilization for neck pain, some forms of headache, and some extremity joint conditions. A 2011 Cochrane review found strong evidence that suggests there is no clinically meaningful difference between spinal manipulation therapy and other treatments for reducing pain and improving function for chronic low back pain. A 2008 review found that with the possible exception of lower back pain, chiropractic manipulation is not effective for any medical condition.

=== Non-musculoskeletal disorders ===
The use of spinal manipulation for non-musculoskeletal conditions is controversial. It is not effective for asthma, headache, hypertension, or dysmenorrhea. There is no scientific data that supports the use of spinal manipulation for idiopathic adolescent scoliosis.

=== Cost-effectiveness ===
Spinal manipulation is generally regarded as a cost-effective treatment of musculoskeletal conditions when used alone or in combination with other treatment approaches. Evidence supports the cost-effectiveness of using spinal manipulation for the treatment of sub-acute or chronic low back pain, whereas the results for acute low back pain were inconsistent.

== Safety ==
All treatments need a thorough medical history, diagnosis, and plan of management. Chiropractors must rule out contraindications to any treatments, including adverse events.

Relative contraindications, such as osteoporosis are conditions where increased risk is acceptable in some situations and where mobilization and soft-tissue techniques may be treatments of choice. Most contraindications apply to the manipulation of the affected region.

While safety has been debated, and serious injuries and deaths can occur and may be under-reported, these are generally rare and spinal manipulation is relatively safe when employed skillfully and appropriately.

Adverse events are believed to be under-reported and appear to be more common following high velocity/low amplitude manipulation than mobilization. Mild, frequent and temporary adverse events occur in spinal manipulation which include temporary increase in pain, tenderness and stiffness. These effects generally are reduced within 24–48 hours Serious injuries and fatal consequences, especially from spinal manipulation in the upper cervical region, can occur, but are regarded as rare when spinal manipulation is employed skillfully and appropriately.

Weak to moderately strong evidence supports causation (as opposed to statistical association) between cervical manipulative therapy and vertebrobasilar artery stroke. A 2012 review found that there is not enough evidence to support a strong association or no association between cervical manipulation and stroke. A 2008 review found chiropractic spinal manipulation is more commonly associated with serious adverse effects than other professionals following manipulation and concluded that the risk of death from manipulations to the neck outweighs the benefits.
