= The Journal of Chiropractic Education =

- Discipline: Chiropractic
- Language: English
- Edited by: Bart Green

Publication details
- History: 1987-present
- Frequency: Biannually
- Open access: Yes

Standard abbreviations
- ISO 4: J. Chiropr. Educ.

Indexing
- ISSN: 1042-5055
- OCLC no.: 19085455

Links
- Journal homepage; PubMed Central archives

The Journal of Chiropractic Education is a medical journal and the official journal of the Association of Chiropractic Colleges. It publishes articles related to "educational theory, methods, and content relevant to the practice of chiropractic". The journal is indexed in PubMed (but not MEDLINE) and CINAHL.
