= Unequal leg length =

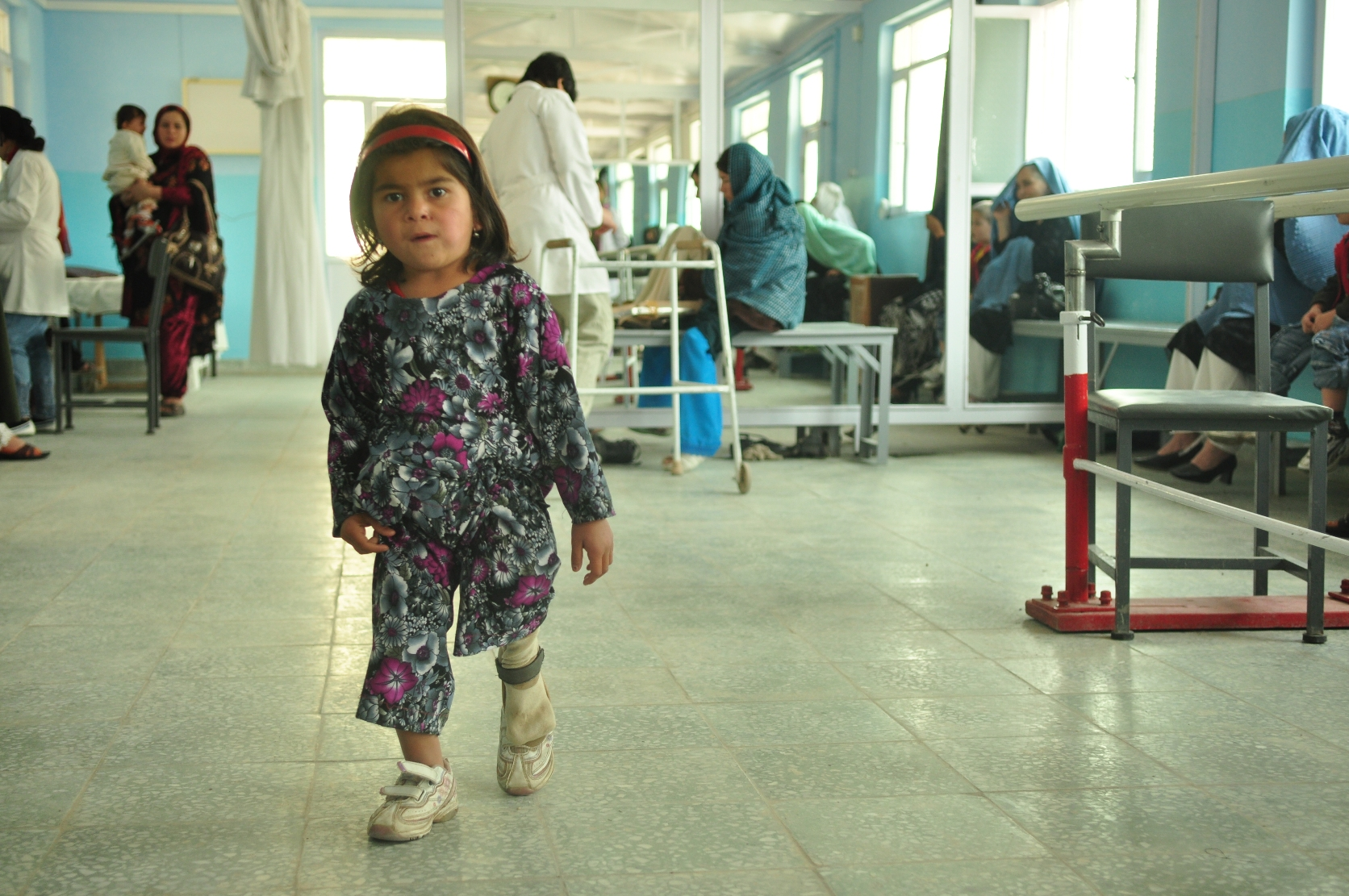
- A girl with a congenital, structural difference in leg lengths walking in a clinic.
- Specialty: Rheumatology

Unequal leg length (also termed leg length inequality, LLI or leg length discrepancy, LLD) is often a disabling condition where the legs are either different lengths (structurally), or appear to be different lengths, because of misalignment (functionally).

Unequal leg length with a very small degree of difference can be common; small inequalities in leg length may affect 40%-50% of the human population. It has been estimated that at least 0.1% of the population have a difference greater than 20 mm (0.79 in). As of June 2024, that is approximately 8.1 million people total in the human population.

== Classification ==
There are two main types of leg length discrepancy:

- Structural differences are caused by the leg bones themselves being measurably different in length. Usually due to differences in the length of the femur in the thigh or the tibia and fibula bones in the lower leg. This may be a birth defect or it may occur after a broken leg, serious infection, or local damage to one of the growth plates in that particular leg causing a disruption to normal growth due to traumatic injury, and/or ineffectual recovery from such injury.
- The other, more common, type called a functional leg difference, and is seen when the legs themselves are the same length, but due to neuromuscular injuries in the pelvis or upper leg, one leg or hip is held higher and tighter than the other (hypertonicity in the musculature of the pelvis or leg). These unequally tightened muscles cause the legs to seem to be different lengths, even though careful measurement would show equal lengths of the actual bones within the leg or legs. This is called leg length alignment asymmetry (LLAA) and can be seen while lying down.

== Diagnosis and workup ==
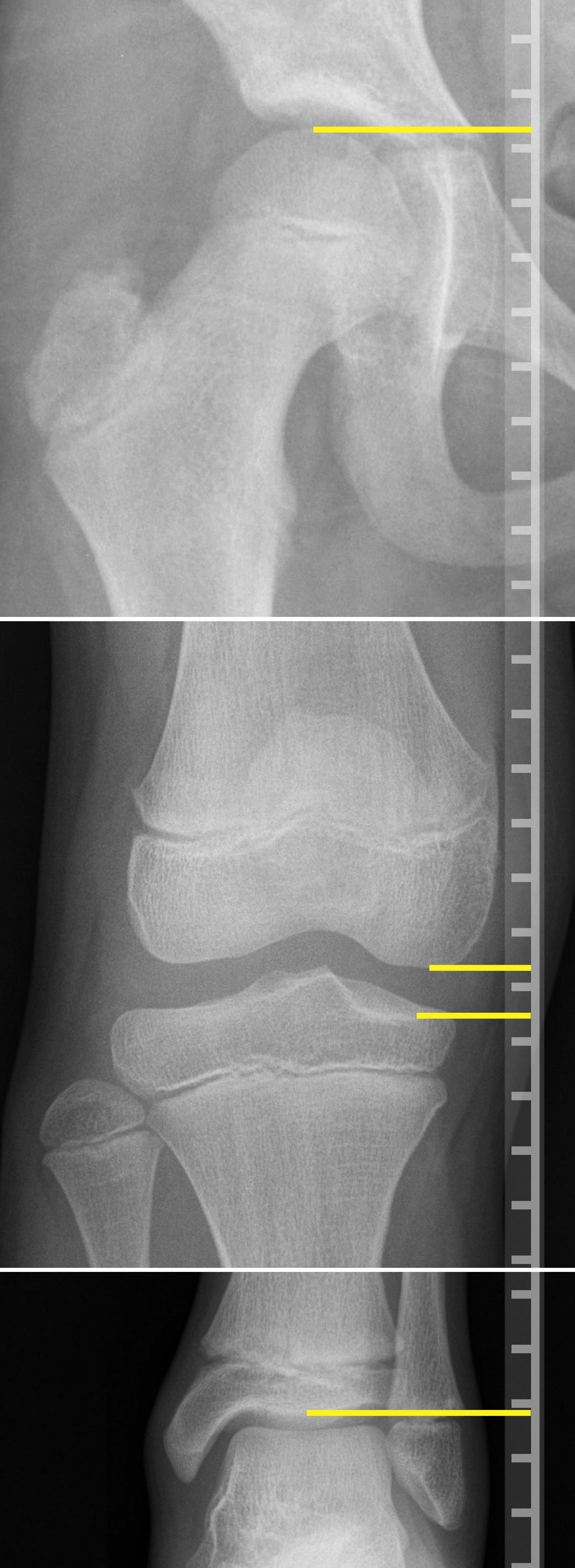
X-rays for leg length measurement.

Unequal leg length in children is frequently first suspected by parents noticing a limp that appears to be getting worse. The standard workup in children is a thorough physical examination, including observing the child while walking and running. In the United States, standard workup in children also includes X-rays to quantify actual length of the bones of the legs.

On X-rays, there is generally measurement of both the femur and the tibia, as well as both combined. Various measuring points for these have been suggested, but a functional method is to measure the distances between joint surfaces:

- Femur length: The superior aspect of the femoral head and the distal portion of the medial femoral condyle.
- Tibial length: The medial tibial plateau and the tibial plafond

As previously mentioned, leg length difference can result from a repetitive activity that misaligns, one example being pelvic torsion; this is a functional LLD.

Abnormal (gravity drive) pronation will drive the innominate bones forward (anteriorly). The forward rotation of the innominate will shorten the leg. The more pronated foot will have the more forwardly rotated innominate bone and will be the side with the functionally short leg.

In adults, leg length discrepancy causes pain and challenge to the kinetic chain of the body's structure and almost every other part of the body – even organs because of the spaces and connection the nerves demand throughout the joints of the body. They may therefore become impaired and can become dysfunctional, according to the severity of differentiation in the discrepancy. Balance issues often cause muscle deconditioning as the spinal column tries to compensate and bend more than is safe for the joint and nerve spacing in the spinal column, leading to more denervation and weakness. The increased weight and pressure of the longer leg on the shorter leg often leads to denervation and weakness. Sciatica and blood circulation in the lower limbs is impaired as well.

Low back pain will occur with increased pelvic obliquity; X-rays of the sacroilliac joint may help determine joint impingement and any lumbar scoliosis that often, if not always, occurs.

== Treatment ==
The most common treatment for discrepancies in leg length is the use of a simple heel lift; this is outdated, and may lead to foot cramping and discomfort. The modern remedy is a full orthotic insole or outsole lift which can be placed inside or outside the shoe. In cases where the length discrepancy is moderate, an external build up to the shoe is necessary to accommodate the foot spacing in most modern shoes. An improved method for addressing differences in leg length involves measuring and rectifying the disparities while standing upright and weight bearing. Adjustments of minor or significant biomechanical change can be made to the foot's angle and height to correct the discrepancies in real-time using a mechanical device like the Vertical Foot Alignment System (VFAS). This technique will take into account the changes that the foot goes through when under a weight-bearing condition including correct foot alignment, arch support and comfort.

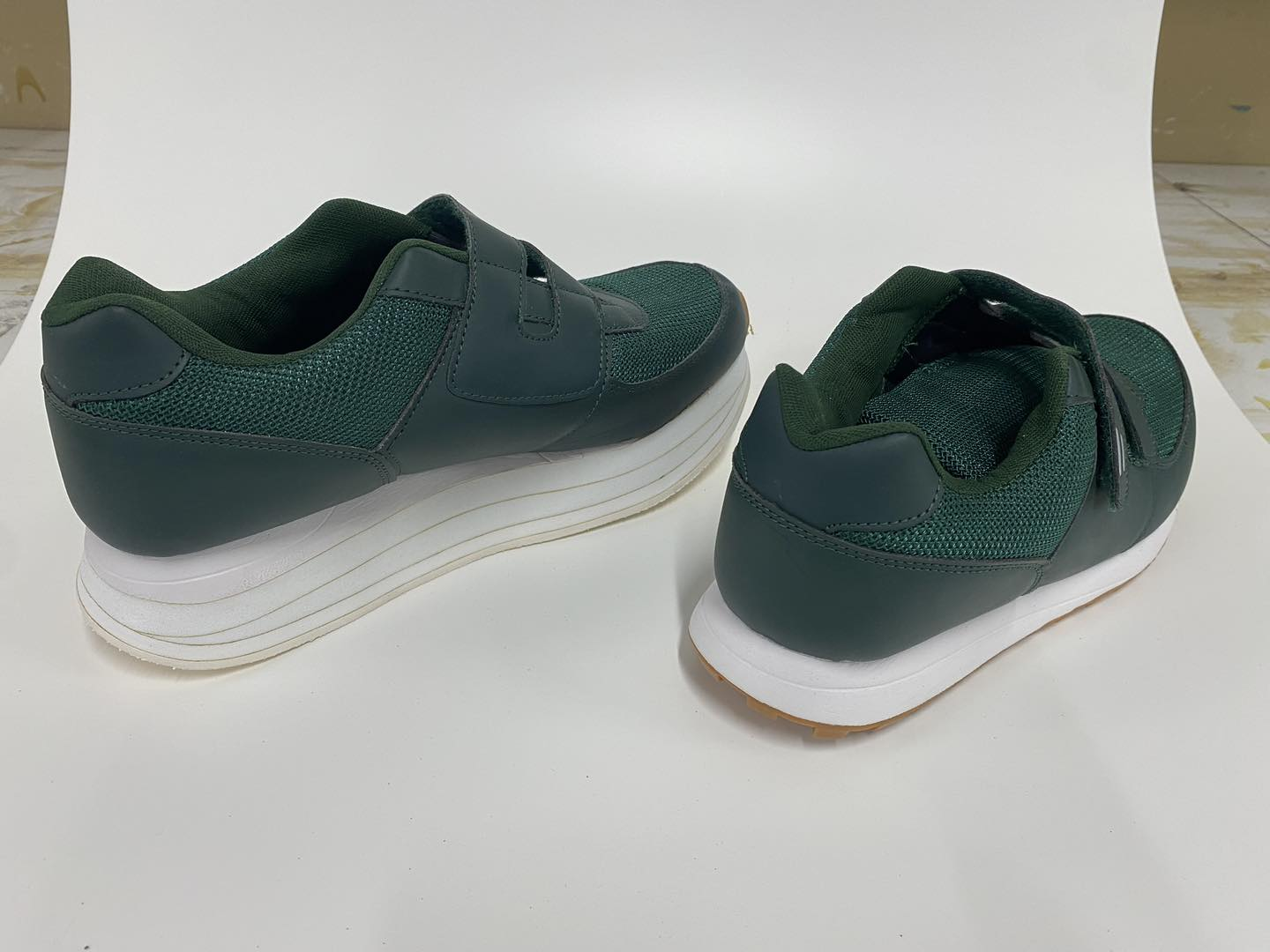
The left shoe has greater height and weight bearing correction designed using VFAS.

In severe cases, surgery can be used to make the longer leg shorter (or impede its growth), and/or make the shorter leg longer via limb lengthening.

== Measurement challenges ==
Although prone "functional leg length" is a widely used chiropractic tool in their Activator technique, it is not a recognized anthropometric technique, since most legs are usually only to a small degree unequal, and measurements in the prone position are not entirely valid estimates of standing X-ray differences. Measurements in the standing position are far more reliable. Since another confounding factor is that simply moving the two legs held together and leaning them imperceptibly to one side or the other produces different results.

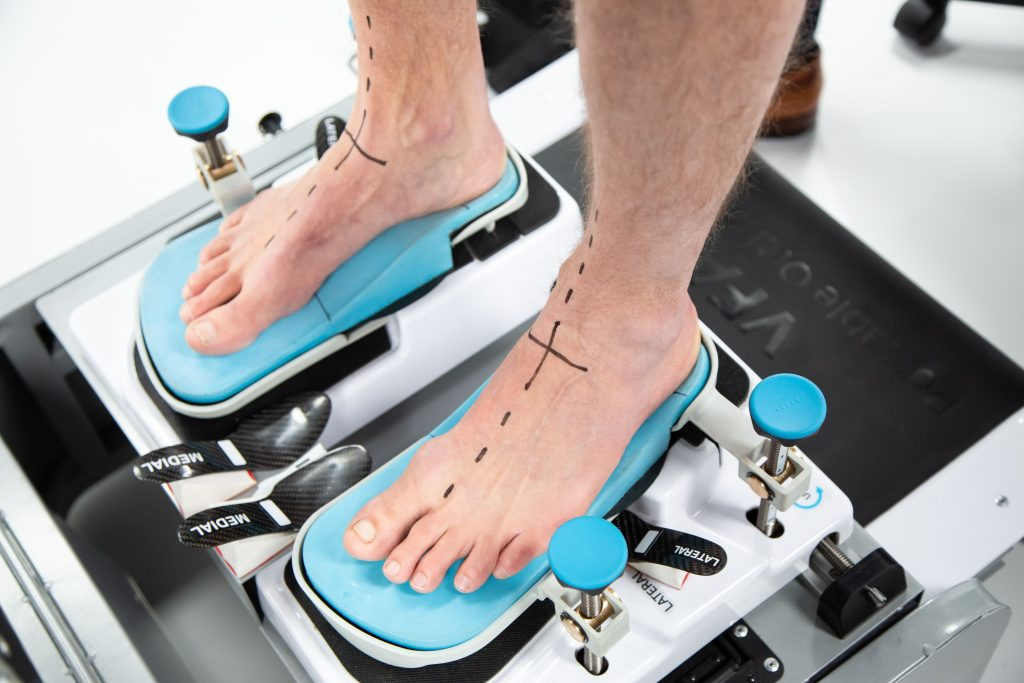
VFAS is a mechanical device used to correct foot alignment while weight bearing

Clinical measurement of leg length conventionally uses the distance from the anterior superior iliac spine to the medial malleolus. Projectional radiographic measurements of leg length have two main variants:

- Teleroentgenogram, which projects the entirety of both legs at the same time.
- Orthoroentgenogram, which takes separate images of the hip, knee and ankle.

On X-rays, the length of the lower limb can be measured from the proximal end of femoral head to the center of the plafond of the distal tibia.

== See also ==
- Logan v. Zimmerman Brush Co., lawsuit over alleged job discrimination over LLI that reached the U.S. Supreme Court
