= Activator technique =

Chiropractic treatment method and device

Activator V Chiropractic Adjusting Instrument

The Activator Method Chiropractic Technique is a chiropractic treatment method that uses a device created by Arlan Fuhr as an alternative to manual manipulation of the spine or extremity joints. The device is categorized as a mechanical force manual assisted (MFMA) instrument which is generally regarded as a softer chiropractic treatment technique. The method purports to use the device to identify and remove vertebral subluxations and correct "pelvic deficiency", defined as an "'apparent' difference in leg length, not an anatomical difference". These claims have been criticized.

== Activator Adjusting Instrument ==
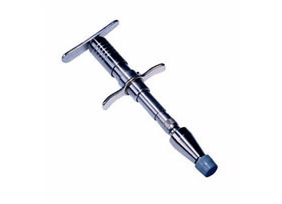
An Activator II instrument

The traditional Activator Adjusting Instrument (AAI), or more simply, Activator, is a small handheld spring-loaded instrument which delivers a controlled and reproducible tap to the spine or other body part. The aim is to produce enough force to move the vertebrae, but not enough to cause injury. The tool's design is based on a dental impactor, a device that taps dental amalgam into cavities in teeth.

Activator I was patented by Activator Methods International on September 26, 1978. Activator II was released, with an added "impedance head", in 1994. Activator V is a cordless electric version that gives off no more than 0.3 J of kinetic energy in a 3-millisecond pulse. It is the first cordless electronic chiropractic adjustment instrument registered with and approved by the U.S. Food and Drug Administration (FDA).

== Leg length test reliability ==
The method involves using the device to identify and remove vertebral subluxations and correct "pelvic deficiency", defined as an "'apparent' difference in leg length, not an anatomical difference". The chiropractor checks the patient's "functional leg length" in the prone position, then uses the device on various parts of the body, and then rechecks the leg length to see if the Activator produced a change. This is repeated until the legs are apparently of an equal length and the treatment is considered to have resolved any vertebral subluxations.

Although prone "functional leg length" is a widely used chiropractic tool, it is not a recognized anthropometric technique, since legs are often naturally of unequal length, and measurements in the prone position are not entirely valid estimates of standing X-ray differences. Measurements in the standing position are far more reliable. Another confounding factor is that simply moving the two legs held together and leaning them imperceptibly to one side or the other produces different results. The Activator Methods technique uses leg length checks while prone (Position 1) and with the knees bent to 90 degrees (Position 2). Research shows good intraexaminer reliability and moderate interexaminer reliability with leg length checks in position 1, however no consensus has been met on the accuracy of leg length checks in position 1.

== Utilization and criticism ==
In 2003, the National Board of Chiropractic Examiners found that 69.9% of chiropractors used the technique, and 23.9% of patients received it. The majority of U.S. chiropractic schools and some schools in other countries teach the AMCT method, and an estimated 45,000 chiropractors worldwide use AMCT or some part of the technique.

In 2001, the Chiropractors' Association of Saskatchewan considered the device "useless" and prohibited its use, a ban that was disputed in court. The ban was lifted in 2003.
