= Joseph Janse =

American chiropractor (1909–1985)

Dr. Joseph Janse
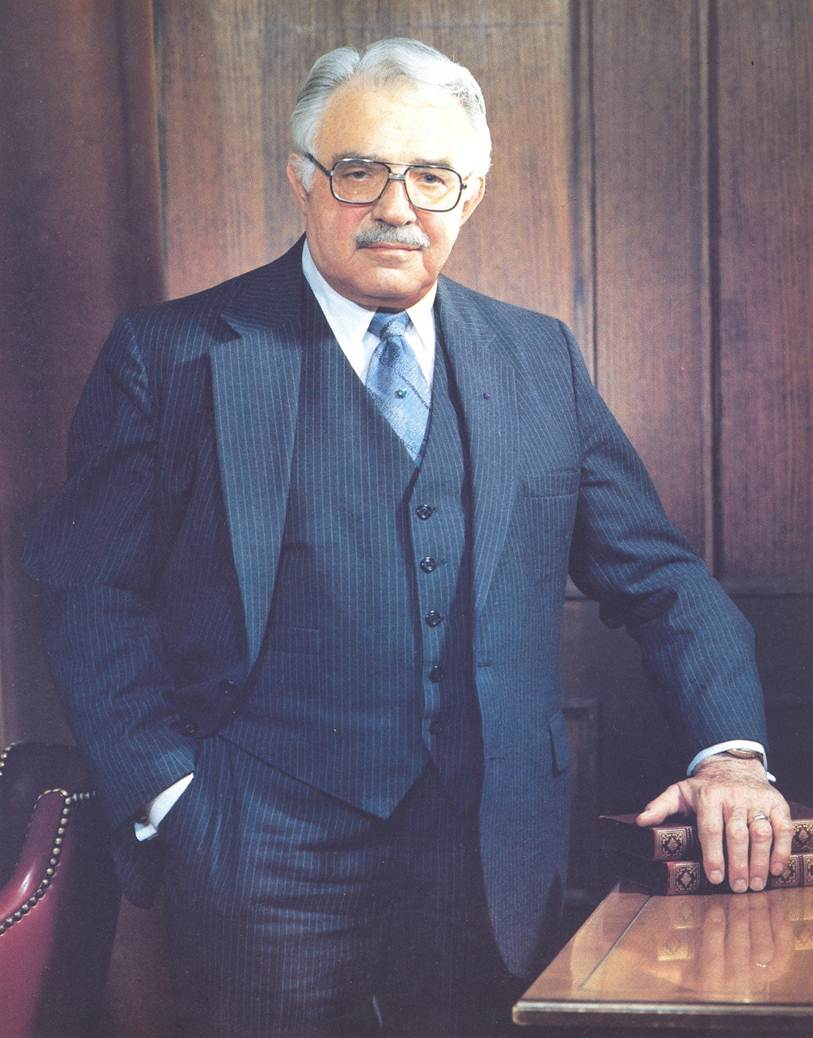
- Dr. Joseph Janse
- Born: August 19, 1909; Middelburg, Netherlands
- Died: December 18, 1985 (aged 76); Illinois
- Education: National College of Chiropractic
- Occupations: Chiropractic Physician College President, Teacher
- Known for: Founding the Council on Chiropractic Education – USA; University President
- Title: Physician, (DC)
- Spouse: Gloria Julie Schade (m. 1938)
- Parent(s): Jan Pieter and Gertrude (De Voogd) Janse

Joseph Janse (August 19, 1909 in Middelburg, Netherlands – December 18, 1985), was the third child of Jan Pieter and Gertrude (De Voogd) Janse. Arriving in the US at age six, he attended the Weber County, Utah public schools, and he received two years of Pre-medical education at Weber State College by 1930. After three years in Europe as a missionary, he transferred to University of Utah to complete his pre-medical studies. He entered National College of Chiropractic in the spring of 1935 and received both the DC and ND degrees on June 17, 1938. On June 24, 1938, he married Gloria Julie Schade in Utah and they had three children.

== Biography ==
Upon graduation from National College, he immediately joined their faculty, and taught in the departments of Anatomy and Chiropractic, continuing through his tenure as President. He was named one of four Deans, and then in December, 1944, he was elected to the College's Board of Trustees. And in their Minutes of that meeting, he was elected President of National College.

Dr. Janse was licensed to practice in eleven states, and qualified by the Canadian board as well.

- 1947 - He spearheaded the formation of the Council on Chiropractic Education – USA, and served as its Secretary from 1947–1959, and President from 1951–1961 and foreign liaison until 1982, the Board took the unprecedented step of naming him "President Emeritus".
- 1967 - He was honored to have been selected to deliver a paper called "The Scientific Basis of Chiropractic" before the U.S. Congressional Ad Hoc Committee on Chiropractic.
- 1971 - His contributions to the science of Chiropractic were so great, that the International College of Chiropractors elected him to the rank of "Dean" of the "Faculty" of the (Honorary) College; a post he held until his death in 1985.
