= International Chiropractors Association =

- Abbreviation: ICA
- Formation: 1926
- Headquarters: 6400 Arlington Boulevard, Suite 650
- Location: Falls Church, Virginia, United States
- Chairman: Selina Sigafoose-Jackson United States
- Website: www.chiropractic.org

The International Chiropractors Association (ICA) was founded by B.J. Palmer in 1926 in Davenport, Iowa, US. Palmer served as it President until his death in 1961.

== Membership ==
The ICA, along with the American Chiropractic Association, is listed as a national chiropractic association representing the United States at the World Federation of Chiropractic, with representation on the executive council. It has individual members all over the world who pay dues, and in that sense they remain "international". Today, its membership is estimated at one fifth that of the only other major national chiropractic association, the American Chiropractic Association. Memberships can be estimated by the dues paid to the World Federation of Chiropractic, which publishes the total amount it receives from its member associations.

== Councils ==
The ICA, through its various Councils, provides continuing education programs for DCs, which lead to diplomate programs. Their Councils include:

- ICA Council on Fitness and Sport Health Science
- ICA Council on Chiropractic Pediatrics
- ICA Council on Applied Chiropractic Science
- ICA Council on Chiropractic Philosophy
- ICA Council on Wellness Science
- ICA Council on Upper Cervical care

The Council on Fitness and Sport Health Science, which was previously called the ICA Sports Council, was a charter member of the International Federation of Sports Chiropractic.

== Continuing education programs ==
The ICA provides continuing education courses which are accredited for continuing education units (CEUs) by the various state licensing boards.

== Veterans Affairs representation ==
In 2002, the ICA was represented by Michael S. McLean, member of the ICA Board of Directors, on the United States Department of Veterans Affairs "Chiropractic Advisory Committee."

== Views on Vaccines ==
The ICA supports the efforts of the National Vaccine Information Center (NVIC). The NVIC is known for promoting false and misleading information about vaccines, in particular the discredited claim that vaccines cause autism.

The ICA's annual conferences have featured anti-vaccination propaganda. In 2018 Guest Speaker Beau Pierce (Pierce co-produced a series entitled Vaccines Revealed) hosted a session entitled Vaccines Revealed., and Jeff Hays, known for producing the anti-Vaccine propaganda Vaccines Revealed, was invited to host a session the 2017 ICA Council on Chiropractic Pediatrics Annual Conference. In 2016 the widely discredited anti-vaccination propaganda film VAXXED was shown at a conference sponsored by the ICA's Council on Chiropractic Pediatrics.

== Merger attempt ==
In the mid-1980s there was a major campaign for ACA members to join the ICA. The rationale was to both free up the name, "International" Chiropractors Association, so that a new organization could be formed to represent the profession at the World level, and to have for the first time, one united voice for the profession in the United States. The attempt failed and the profession reached a consensus in London, in 1987, to create the World Federation of Chiropractic.
