= Toftness device =

Purported radiation detector used in chiropractic

The Toftness Radiation Detector was an instrument used by some chiropractors. It was patented by Irwing N. Toftness in 1971, and was banned from use in the United States in 1982. Toftness claimed that it detected electromagnetic radiation emanating from vertebral subluxations.

The device had multiple forms, but a common configuration consisted of a plastic cylinder with a series of plastic lenses inside, as well as a clear plastic "detection plate". The operator would rub their finger against the detection plate while the device was held close to an area of the spine, and report the degree of perceived resistance against the movement of their fingers. An increase in perceived resistance would indicate which area of the body required chiropractic manipulation. Specifically, Toftness made the claim in his 1971 patent that "what is sensed by the operator is a friction or dragging sensation which retards the passage of a finger or fingers over the surface of the deflection plate."

Toftness devices were banned by the United States District Court in Wisconsin in January 1982. The Court issued a permanent nationwide injunction against the manufacture, promotion, sale, lease, distribution, shipping, delivery, or use of the Toftness Radiation Detector, or any product which utilizes the same principles as the Toftness Radiation Detector. The United States Court of Appeals for the Seventh Circuit upheld the decision in 1984.

According to the United States Food and Drug Administration, the Toftness Radiation Detectors were misbranded under the Food, Drug, and Cosmetic Act because they could not be used safely or effectively for their intended purposes. The devices were purportedly being used to assist with the diagnosis and treatment of injuries, without FDA approval.

In 2013, David Toftness, nephew of Irwing N. Toftness, and the Toftness Post-Graduate School of Chiropractic were fined for shipping the devices across state borders.

== See also ==
- Chiropractic
- Dowsing
- N-ray
- Pathological science
