= Association of Chiropractic Colleges =

- Formation: 1994
- Members: Chiropractic institutions

The Association of Chiropractic Colleges (ACC) is composed of accredited chiropractic educational programs in North America and affiliate member institutions worldwide. Its stated goal is to advance chiropractic education and research among its member institutions, which it achieves through a number of regularly scheduled conferences.

== Conferences ==
The ACC first held its Educational Conference in 1994. At that time, the focus of the conference was to educate the educators on new pedagogical techniques. Since that time, the conference has expanded to include educational, basic science, and clinical research presentations.

The ACC Educational Conference promotes institutional and academic excellence and learning and focuses on two areas, the bringing together of staff, administration, and faculty in a collaborative fashion to discuss various topics at group meetings and the presentation of peer-reviewed papers in poster or platform presentations.

The ACC also sponsored a Research Agenda Conference (ACC-RAC), focused on research training for chiropractic college faculty, students, practitioners, and professional staff. The ACC-RAC consisted primarily of hands on training workshops.

Beginning in 2002, the Educational and Research Agenda conferences were joined into a single conference under the banner of the Research Agenda Conference. Through various styles of presentation, including plenary sessions, platform presentations, workshops, and poster sessions, the ACC-RAC conferences focus on clinical, basic science, educational research, and the topic of Integration.

== ACC Peer Review ==
A component of the Association of Chiropractic Colleges Educational Conference (ACC) focuses on collaborative group meetings (e.g., college administration, staff) and the presentation of scientific and scholarly articles submitted by authors and chosen through a peer-review selection process.

The long range goals of the ACC Peer-review Committee include:

- Maintain the scholarship of the presentations and integrity of the conference
- Increase quality of conference presentations
- Increase number of published papers as a result of the conference
- Increase number of experienced peer reviewers
- Provide scholarship opportunities for new peer reviewers
- Provide mentorship and feedback to peer reviewers and authors

== ACC-RAC Research Presentations ==
Once the committee reaches decisions regarding suitability for presentation, abstracts of articles that are presented as either platform or poster presentations at the conference are published in the Journal of Chiropractic Education. In addition to selecting articles for presentation, a subgroup of this committee selects the award-winning articles from those authors who consented to be included in the awards competition. Basic science and clinical award-winning articles are submitted to the Journal of Manipulative and Physiological Therapeutics (JMPT) and educational research award articles are submitted to the Journal of Chiropractic Education. These articles go through an additional peer-review process before being accepted and published.

The scientific, peer-reviewed presentations cover a wide variety of topics. Most of these presentations fall within four categories: basic sciences, clinical practice research, educational research, and the theme for that year's conference (e.g., public health, funding opportunities, diversity, and technology). Parallel tracks of scientific research presentations are placed throughout the schedule so that clinical, educational, and basic science researchers will find sessions that best match their interests. In addition, for those in clinical practice, case presentations of unusual conditions or unique treatment methods for common conditions are typically presented.
