= Council on Chiropractic Education – USA =

Council on Chiropractic Education
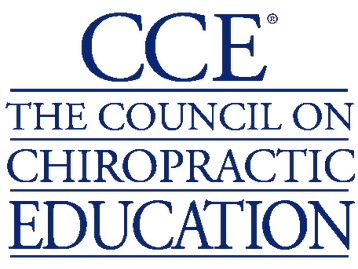
- Abbreviation: CCE
- Formation: 1971
- Headquarters: 8049 N 85th Way
- Location: Scottsdale, Arizona
- Coordinates: 33.555199°N 111.895998°W
- Members: 16 schools (2016)
- President: Craig S. Little
- Website: www.cce-usa.org

The Council on Chiropractic Education (CCE) is an American agency recognized by the United States Department of Education for accreditation of programs and institutions offering the Doctor of Chiropractic degree. The CCE seeks to ensure the quality of chiropractic education in the United States by means of accreditation, educational improvement, and public information. The CCE develops accreditation criteria to assess how effectively programs or institutions plan, implement, and evaluate their mission and goals, program objectives, inputs, resources, and outcomes of their chiropractic programs. The CCE is also recognized by the Council for Higher Education Accreditation (CHEA) and is a member of the Association of Specialized and Professional Accreditors (ASPA).

== Accreditation ==
During the 1950s and 1960s many chiropractic governing bodies were attempting to secure national accreditation from the United States Government. To meet government criteria the CCE passed measures for its associated schools to require incoming students to have completed at least two years of pre-chiropractic college, and revised their educational standards to meet the expectations of higher education.

On August 26, 1974, the United States Commissioner of Education officially listed the CCE as a "Nationally Recognized Accrediting Agency". This followed the support of the organization's accreditation petition by the Federation of Chiropractic Licensing Boards. Once the CCE secured accreditation this allowed for eligibility for federal education and research grants, student eligibility for federal loans, and gave increased legitimacy for chiropractic as a profession overall. The accreditation of the CCE also allowed organizations such as the FCLB and American Chiropractic Association to put pressure on non-compliant schools to update their curriculums to match the national expectations of all chiropractic schools.
