= World Federation of Chiropractic =

- Abbreviation: WFC
- Formation: 1988
- Location: Toronto, Canada
- President: Kendrah da Silva
- Website: www.wfc.org

The World Federation of Chiropractic (WFC) (French: La Fédération Mondiale de Chiropratique (FMC); Spanish: La Federación Mundial de Quiropráctica (FMQ)) represents itself as an international consulting body representing chiropractic to the international health care community.

== Background ==
In September 1987, at a World Chiropractic Summit convened by the European Chiropractors' Union in London, England, there was agreement that a President's Committee be formed to inquire into, and report upon, the formation of a world federation representing national chiropractic associations. The President's Committee reported, and the World Federation of Chiropractic was established in Sydney, Australia on October 2, 1988 at a World Chiropractic Congress organized by the Chiropractors' Association of Australia. It was initially conceived by Gary Auerbach of Tucson, Arizona, in consultation with David Chapman-Smith, a barrister practicing in Toronto, Canada.

The offices of the WFC are under the direction of Brad Beira, who was appointed as Secretary General on 01 July 2025.

== Recognition ==
The WFC is a non-state actor that is not currently recognized by the World Health Organization. The WFC is an Associate Member of the Council for International Organizations of Medical Sciences (CIOMS).
