= Chiropractic =

Form of pseudoscientific alternative medicine

Alternative medicine
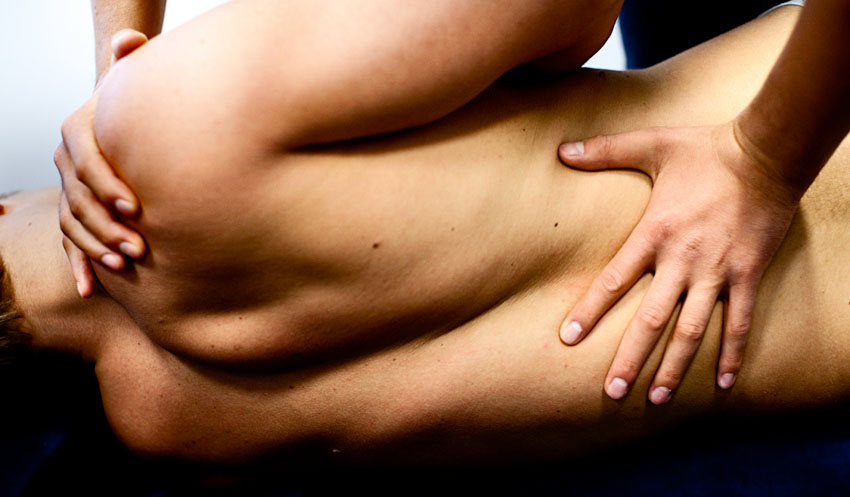
- A chiropractor performing a vertebral adjustment
- Claims: Vertebral subluxation, spinal adjustment, Innate Intelligence
- Risks: Vertebral artery dissection (stroke), compression fracture, death
- Related fields: Osteopathy, vitalism
- Original proponents: D. D. Palmer, B. J. Palmer
- MeSH: D002684

Chiropractic (/ˌkaɪroʊˈpræktɪk/) is a form of alternative medicine concerned with the diagnosis, treatment and prevention of mechanical disorders of the musculoskeletal system, especially of the spine. The main chiropractic treatment technique involves manual therapy but may also include exercises and health and lifestyle counseling. Most who seek chiropractic care do so for low back pain. Chiropractic is well established in the United States, Canada, and Australia, along with other manual-therapy professions such as osteopathy and physical therapy.

Many chiropractors (often known informally as chiros), especially those in the field's early history, have proposed that mechanical disorders affect general health, and that regular manipulation of the spine (spinal adjustment) improves general health. A chiropractor may have a Doctor of Chiropractic (D.C.) degree and be referred to as "doctor" but is not a Doctor of Medicine (M.D.) or a Doctor of Osteopathic Medicine (D.O.). While many chiropractors view themselves as primary care providers, chiropractic clinical training does not meet the requirements for that designation.

There is no compelling evidence that either primary or maintenance chiropractic adjustment is effective for any symptoms or diseases, including low back pain. A 2011 critical evaluation of 45 systematic reviews concluded that the data included in the study "fail[ed] to demonstrate convincingly that spinal manipulation is an effective intervention for any condition." Conclusions about cost-effectiveness are limited by low-quality studies, uncertainty about efficacy, and insufficient evidence.

There is not sufficient data to establish the safety of chiropractic manipulations. It is frequently associated with mild to moderate adverse effects, with serious or fatal complications in rare cases. There is controversy regarding the degree of risk of vertebral artery dissection, which can lead to stroke and death, from cervical manipulation. Several deaths have been associated with this technique and it has been suggested that the relationship is causative, a claim which is disputed by many chiropractors.

Chiropractic is based on several pseudoscientific ideas. Spiritualist D. D. Palmer founded chiropractic in the 1890s, claiming that he had received it from "the other world", from a doctor who had died 50 years previously. Throughout its history, chiropractic has been controversial. Its foundation is at odds with evidence-based medicine, and is underpinned by pseudoscientific ideas such as vertebral subluxation and Innate Intelligence. Despite the overwhelming evidence that vaccination is an effective public health intervention, there are significant disagreements among chiropractors over the subject, which has led to negative impacts on both public vaccination and mainstream acceptance of chiropractic. The American Medical Association called chiropractic an "unscientific cult" in 1966 and boycotted it until losing an antitrust case in 1987. Chiropractic has had a strong political base and sustained demand for services. In the late 20th century, it gained more legitimacy and greater acceptance among conventional physicians and health plans in the United States. Anti-vaccinationism is prevalent within chiropractic, and a significant number of chiropracters spread vaccine misinformation.

== Status as fringe healing ==
Chiropractic is not regarded as a mainstream branch of medicine.

=== Origins in "folk medicine" ===
Chiropractic's origins lie in the folk medicine of bonesetting, and as it evolved it incorporated vitalism, spiritual inspiration and rationalism. Its founder, D. D. Palmer, called it "a science of healing without drugs". Its early philosophy was based on deduction from irrefutable doctrine, which helped distinguish chiropractic from medicine, provided it with legal and political defenses against claims of practicing medicine without a license, and allowed chiropractors to establish themselves as an autonomous profession. This "straight" philosophy, taught to generations of chiropractors, rejects the inferential reasoning of the scientific method, and relies on deductions from vitalistic first principles rather than on the materialism of science. However, most practitioners tend to incorporate scientific research into chiropractic, and most practitioners are "mixers" who attempt to combine the materialistic reductionism of science with the metaphysics of their predecessors and with the holistic paradigm of wellness. A 2008 commentary proposed that chiropractic actively divorce itself from the straight philosophy as part of a campaign to eliminate untestable dogma and engage in critical thinking and evidence-based research.

Although a wide diversity of ideas exist among chiropractors, they share the belief that the spine and health are related in a fundamental way, and that this relationship is mediated through the nervous system. Some chiropractors claim spinal manipulation can have an effect on a variety of ailments such as irritable bowel syndrome and asthma.

=== "Subluxation" as a Vitalist concept ===
In science-based medicine, the term "subluxation" refers to an incomplete or partial dislocation of a joint, from the Latin luxare for "dislocate". Whereas medical doctors use the term exclusively to refer to physical dislocations, Chiropractic founder D. D. Palmer imbued the word subluxation with a metaphysical and philosophical meaning drawn from pseudoscientific traditions such as Vitalism.

Palmer claimed that vertebral subluxations interfered with the body's function and its inborn ability to heal itself. D. D. Palmer repudiated his earlier theory that vertebral subluxations caused pinched nerves in the intervertebral spaces in favor of subluxations causing altered nerve vibration, either too tense or too slack, affecting the tone (health) of the end organ. He qualified this by noting that knowledge of innate intelligence was not essential to the competent practice of chiropractic. This concept was later expanded upon by his son, B. J. Palmer, and was instrumental in providing the legal basis of differentiating chiropractic from conventional medicine.

Vertebral subluxation, a core concept of traditional chiropractic, remains unsubstantiated and largely untested, and a debate about whether to keep it in the chiropractic paradigm has been ongoing for decades. In general, critics of traditional subluxation-based chiropractic (including chiropractors) are skeptical of its clinical value, dogmatic beliefs and metaphysical approach. While straight chiropractic still retains the traditional vitalistic construct espoused by the founders, evidence-based chiropractic suggests that a mechanistic view will allow chiropractic care to become integrated into the wider health care community. This is still a continuing source of debate within the chiropractic profession as well, with some schools of chiropractic still teaching the traditional/straight subluxation-based chiropractic, while others have moved towards an evidence-based chiropractic that rejects metaphysical foundings and limits itself to primarily neuromusculoskeletal conditions.

In 2005, the chiropractic subluxation was defined by the World Health Organization as "a lesion or dysfunction in a joint or motion segment in which alignment, movement integrity and/or physiological function are altered, although contact between joint surfaces remains intact. It is essentially a functional entity, which may influence biomechanical and neural integrity." This differs from the medical definition of subluxation as a significant structural displacement, which can be seen with static imaging techniques such as X-rays.

Attorney David Chapman-Smith, Secretary-General of the World Federation of Chiropractic, has stated that "Medical critics have asked how there can be a subluxation if it cannot be seen on X-ray. The answer is that the chiropractic subluxation is essentially a functional entity, not structural, and is therefore no more visible on static X-ray than a limp or headache or any other functional problem." The General Chiropractic Council, the statutory regulatory body for chiropractors in the United Kingdom, states that the chiropractic vertebral subluxation complex "is not supported by any clinical research evidence that would allow claims to be made that it is the cause of disease."

As of 2014, the US National Board of Chiropractic Examiners states "The specific focus of chiropractic practice is known as the chiropractic subluxation or joint dysfunction. A subluxation is a health concern that manifests in the skeletal joints, and, through complex anatomical and physiological relationships, affects the nervous system and may lead to reduced function, disability or illness."

=== Pseudoscience versus spinal manipulation therapy ===
While some chiropractors limit their practice to short-term treatment of musculoskeletal conditions, many falsely claim to be able to treat a myriad of other conditions. Some dissuade patients from seeking medical care, others have pretended to be qualified to act as a family doctor.

Quackwatch, an alternative medicine watchdog, cautions against seeing chiropractors who:

- Treat young children
- Discourage immunization
- Pretend to be a family doctor
- Take full spine X-rays
- Promote unproven dietary supplements
- Are antagonistic to scientific medicine
- Claim to treat non-musculoskeletal problems

Writing for the Skeptical Inquirer, one physician cautioned against seeing even chiropractors who solely claim to treat musculoskeletal conditions:

I think Spinal Manipulation Therapy (SMT) is a reasonable option for patients to try ... But I could not in good conscience refer a patient to a chiropractor... When chiropractic is effective, what is effective is not 'chiropractic': it is SMT. SMT is also offered by physical therapists, DOs, and others. These are science-based providers ... If I thought a patient might benefit from manipulation, I would rather refer him or her to a science-based provider.

== Scope of practice ==
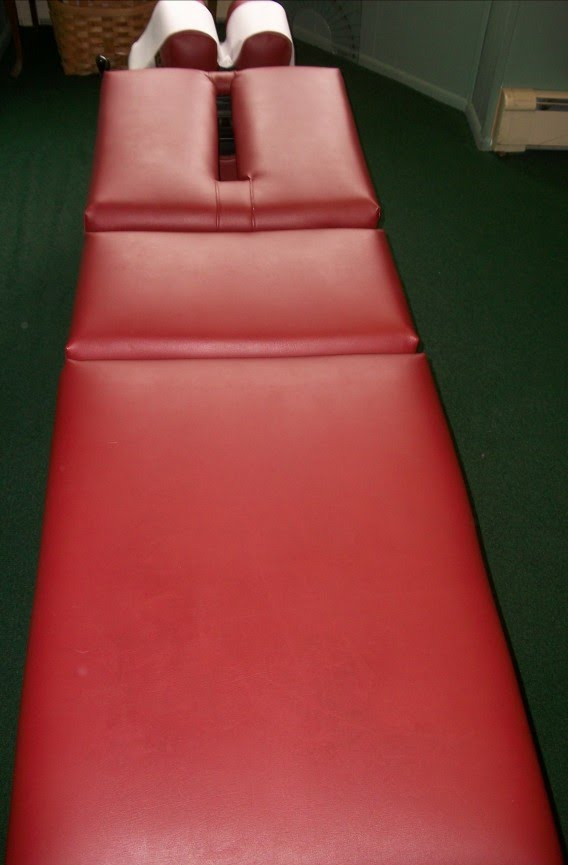
A treatment table at a chiropractic office

Chiropractors emphasize the conservative management of the neuromusculoskeletal system without the use of evidence-based medicines or surgery, with special emphasis on the spine. Back and neck pain are the specialties of chiropractic, but many chiropractors treat ailments other than musculoskeletal issues. There is a range of opinions among chiropractors: some believe that treatment should be confined to the spine, or back and neck pain; others disagree. For example, while one 2009 survey of American chiropractors had found that 73% classified themselves as "back pain/musculoskeletal specialists", the label "back and neck pain specialists" was regarded by 47% of them as the least-desirable description in a 2005 international survey. It has been proposed that chiropractors specialize in nonsurgical spine care, instead of attempting also to treat other problems, but the more expansive view of chiropractic is still widespread.

Mainstream health care and governmental organizations such as the World Health Organization consider chiropractic to be complementary and alternative medicine (CAM); and a 2008 study reported that 31% of surveyed chiropractors categorized chiropractic as CAM, 27% as integrated medicine, and 12% as mainstream medicine. Many chiropractors believe they are primary care providers, including US and UK chiropractors, but the length, breadth, and depth of chiropractic clinical training do not support the requirements to be considered primary care providers, so their role on primary care is limited and disputed.

Chiropractic overlaps with several other forms of manual therapy, including massage therapy, osteopathy, physical therapy, and sports medicine. In a 2010 article on the history of manipulative therapy, the author opined that "physical therapy emerged and grew alongside osteopathy, chiropractic, and the evolving "scientific" medical profession. However, over the next 100 years, physical therapy, osteopathy, and chiropractic were destined to travel very different paths. In its country of origin, osteopathy would coalesce with the medical profession. Chiropractic would remain autonomous from, and highly competitive with, medicine. Physical therapy, whose roots lay in working alongside and cooperating with medical physicians, continues to do so.". Osteopathy outside the US remains primarily a manual medical system; physical therapists work alongside and cooperate with mainstream medicine, and osteopathic medicine in the U.S. has merged with the medical profession. Practitioners may distinguish these competing approaches through claims that, compared to other therapists, chiropractors heavily emphasize spinal manipulation, tend to use firmer manipulative techniques, and promote maintenance care; that osteopaths use a wider variety of treatment procedures; and that physical therapists emphasize machinery and exercise.

Chiropractic diagnosis may involve a range of methods, including skeletal imaging, observational and tactile assessments, and orthopedic and neurological evaluation. A chiropractor may also refer a patient to an appropriate specialist or co-manage with another health care provider. Common patient management involves spinal manipulation (SM) and other manual therapies to the joints and soft tissues, rehabilitative exercises, health promotion, electrical modalities, complementary procedures and lifestyle advice.

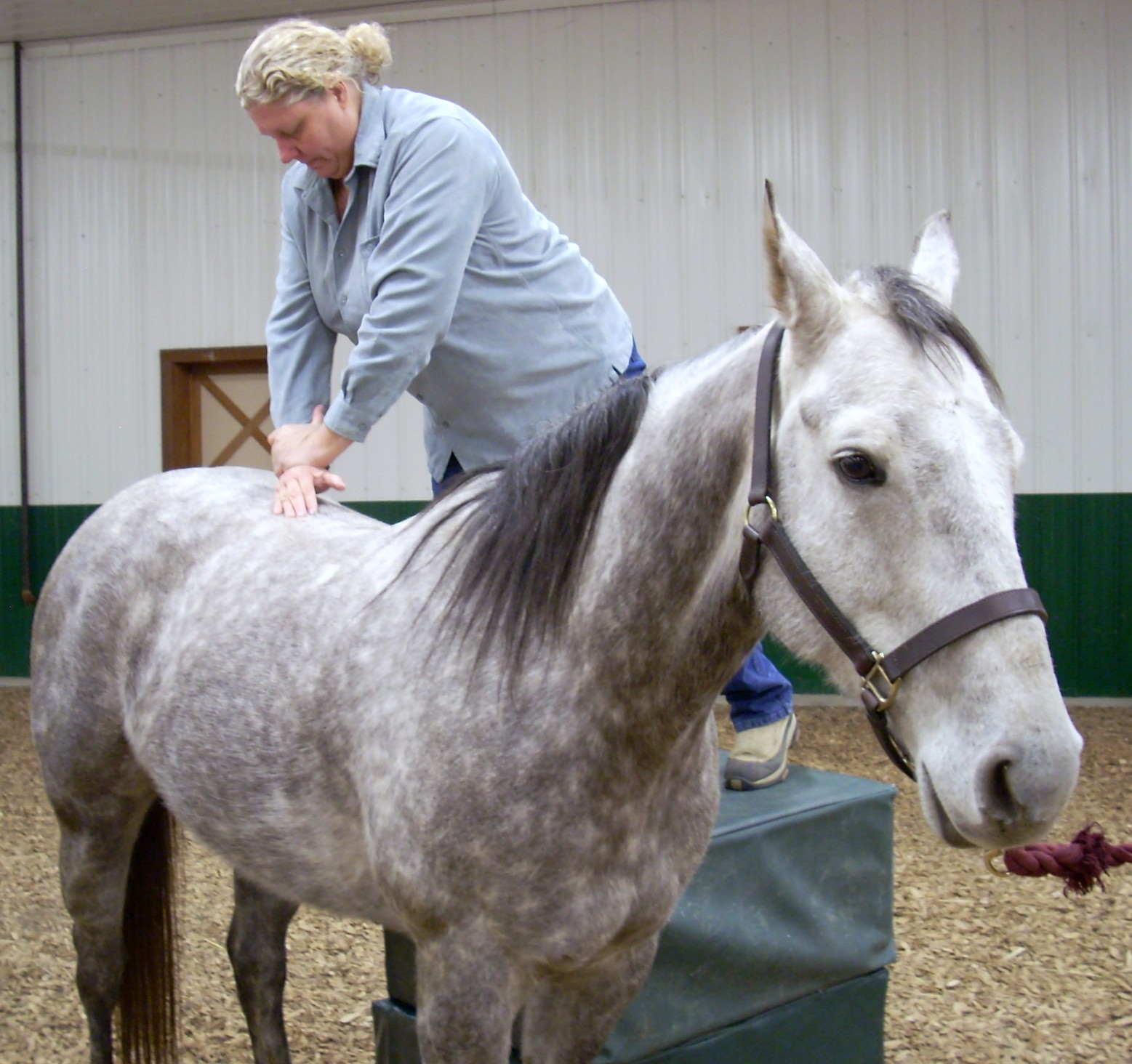
A chiropractic adjustment of a horse

A related field, veterinary chiropractic, applies manual therapies to animals and is recognized in many US states, but is not recognized by the American Chiropractic Association as being chiropractic. It remains controversial within certain segments of the veterinary and chiropractic professions.

No single profession "owns" spinal manipulation, and there is little consensus on which profession should administer SM, raising concerns among chiropractors that other medical physicians could "steal" SM procedures from chiropractors. A focus on evidence-based SM research has also raised concerns that the resulting practice guidelines could limit the scope of chiropractic practice to treating backs and necks. Two US states (Washington and Arkansas) prohibit physical therapists from performing SM, some states allow them to do it only if they have completed advanced training in SM, and some states allow only chiropractors to perform SM, or only chiropractors and physicians. Bills to further prohibit non-chiropractors from performing SM are regularly introduced into state legislatures and are opposed by physical therapist organizations.

== Treatments ==
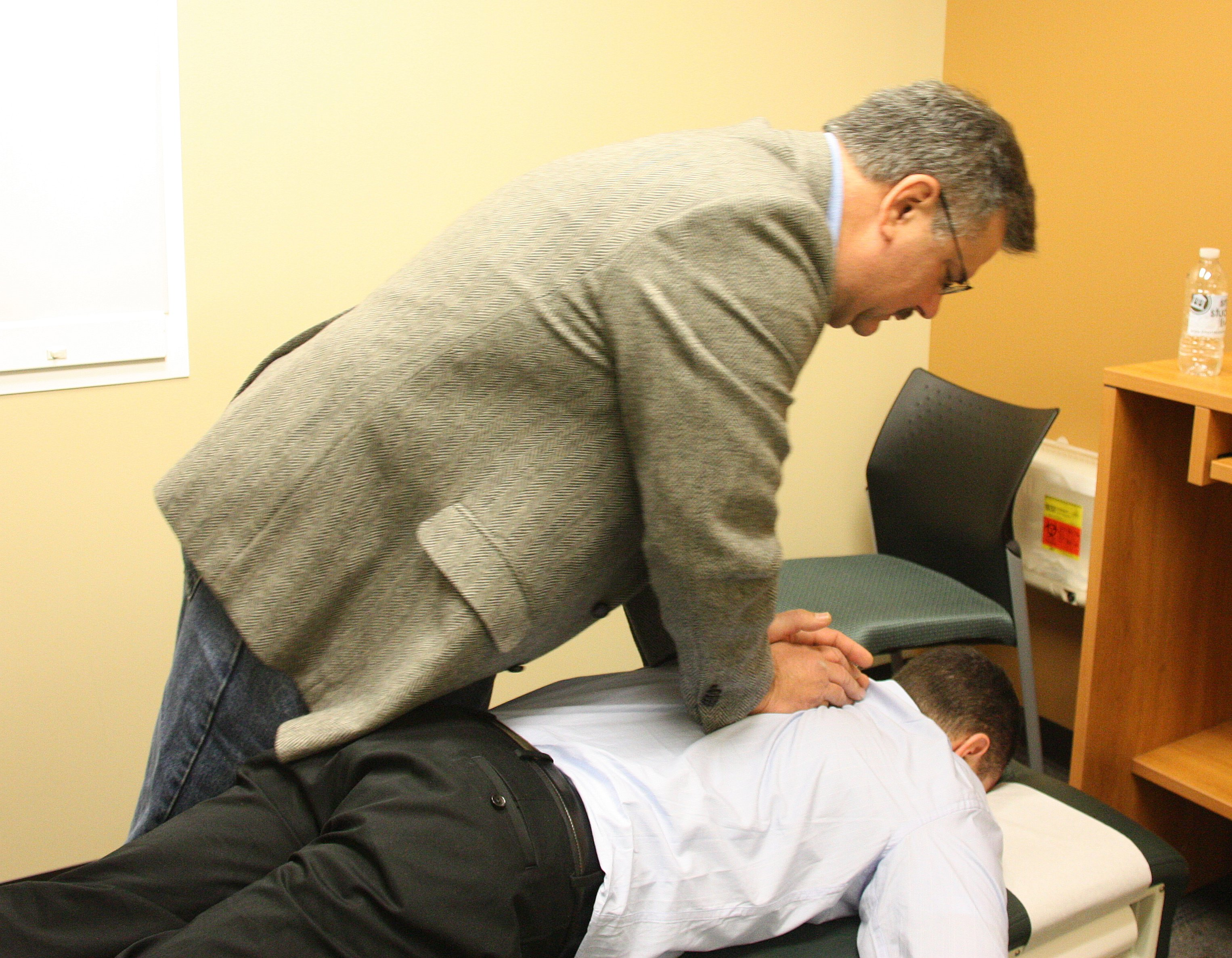
A chiropractor performs an adjustment on a patient.

Spinal manipulation, which chiropractors call "spinal adjustment" or "chiropractic adjustment", is the most common treatment used in chiropractic care. Spinal manipulation is a passive manual maneuver during which a three-joint complex is taken past the normal range of movement, but not so far as to dislocate or damage the joint. Its defining factor is a dynamic thrust, which is a sudden force that causes an audible release and attempts to increase a joint's range of motion. High-velocity, low-amplitude spinal manipulation (HVLA-SM) thrusts have physiological effects that signal neural discharge from paraspinal muscle tissues, depending on duration and amplitude of the thrust are factors of the degree in paraspinal muscle spindles activation. Clinical skill in employing HVLA-SM thrusts depends on the ability of the practitioner to handle the duration and magnitude of the load. More generally, spinal manipulative therapy (SMT) describes techniques where the hands are used to manipulate, massage, mobilize, adjust, stimulate, apply traction to, or otherwise influence the spine and related tissues.

There are several schools of chiropractic adjustive techniques, although most chiropractors mix techniques from several schools. The following adjustive procedures were received by more than 10% of patients of licensed US chiropractors in a 2003 survey: Diversified technique (full-spine manipulation, employing various techniques), extremity adjusting, Activator technique (which uses a spring-loaded tool to deliver precise adjustments to the spine), Thompson Technique (which relies on a drop table and detailed procedural protocols), Gonstead (which emphasizes evaluating the spine along with specific adjustment that avoids rotational vectors), Cox/flexion-distraction (a gentle, low-force adjusting procedure which mixes chiropractic with osteopathic principles and utilizes specialized adjusting tables with movable parts), adjustive instrument, Sacro-Occipital Technique (which models the spine as a torsion bar), Nimmo Receptor-Tonus Technique, applied kinesiology (which emphasises "muscle testing" as a diagnostic tool), and cranial. Chiropractic biophysics technique uses inverse functions of rotations during spinal manipulation. Koren Specific Technique (KST) may use their hands, or they may use an electric device known as an "ArthroStim" for assessment and spinal manipulations. Insurers in the US and UK that cover other chiropractic techniques exclude KST from coverage because they consider it to be "experimental and investigational". Medicine-assisted manipulation, such as manipulation under anesthesia, involves sedation or local anesthetic and is done by a team that includes an anesthesiologist; a 2008 systematic review did not find enough evidence to make recommendations about its use for chronic low back pain.

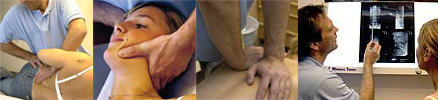
Lumbar, cervical and thoracic chiropractic spinal manipulation

Many other procedures are used by chiropractors for treating the spine, other joints and tissues, and general health issues. The following procedures were received by more than one-third of patients of licensed US chiropractors in a 2003 survey: Diversified technique (full-spine manipulation; mentioned in previous paragraph), physical fitness/exercise promotion, corrective or therapeutic exercise, ergonomic/postural advice, self-care strategies, activities of daily living, changing risky/unhealthy behaviors, nutritional/dietary recommendations, relaxation/stress reduction recommendations, ice pack/cryotherapy, extremity adjusting (also mentioned in previous paragraph), trigger point therapy, and disease prevention/early screening advice.

A 2010 study describing Belgian chiropractors and their patients found chiropractors in Belgium mostly focus on neuromusculoskeletal complaints in adult patients, with emphasis on the spine. The diversified technique is the most often applied technique at 93%, followed by the Activator mechanical-assisted technique at 41%. A 2009 study assessing chiropractic students giving or receiving spinal manipulations while attending a United States chiropractic college found Diversified, Gonstead, and upper cervical manipulations are frequently used methods.

=== Practice guidelines ===
Reviews of research studies within the chiropractic community have been used to generate practice guidelines outlining standards that specify which chiropractic treatments are legitimate (i.e. supported by evidence) and conceivably reimbursable under managed care health payment systems. Evidence-based guidelines are supported by one end of an ideological continuum among chiropractors; the other end employs antiscientific reasoning and makes unsubstantiated claims. Chiropractic remains at a crossroads, and that in order to progress it would need to embrace science; the promotion by some for it to be a cure-all was both "misguided and irrational". A 2007 survey of Alberta chiropractors found that they do not consistently apply research in practice, which may have resulted from a lack of research education and skills. Specific guidelines concerning the treatment of nonspecific (i.e., unknown cause) low back pain are inconsistent between countries.

=== Effectiveness ===
Numerous controlled clinical studies of treatments used by chiropractors have been conducted, with varied results. There is no conclusive evidence that chiropractic manipulative treatment is effective for the treatment of any medical condition, except perhaps for certain kinds of back pain. Though the overall certainty of evidence is low to very low, a Cochrane review found that spinal manipulative therapy for chronic low back pain (lasting more than 12 weeks) may provide small to moderate short-term improvements in pain and function compared to sham or no treatment, but shows little to no difference compared to other conservative therapies.

Generally, the research carried out into the effectiveness of chiropractic has been of poor quality. Research published by chiropractors is distinctly biased: reviews of SM for back pain tended to find positive conclusions when authored by chiropractors, while reviews by mainstream authors did not.

There is a wide range of ways to measure treatment outcomes. Chiropractic care benefits from the placebo response, but it is difficult to construct a trustworthy placebo for clinical trials of spinal manipulative therapy (SMT). The efficacy of maintenance care in chiropractic is unknown.

Available evidence covers the following conditions:

- Low back pain. There is no good evidence chiropractic is effective for helping manage lower back pain. It has only low-quality and inconsistent evidence of benefit, with no clear superiority over standard medical care.
- Radiculopathy. A 2013 systematic review and meta-analysis found a statistically significant improvement in overall recovery from sciatica following SM, when compared to usual care, and suggested that SM may be considered. There is moderate quality evidence to support the use of SM for the treatment of acute lumbar radiculopathy and acute lumbar disc herniation with associated radiculopathy. There is low or very low evidence supporting SM for chronic lumbar spine-related extremity symptoms and cervical spine-related extremity symptoms of any duration and no evidence exists for the treatment of thoracic radiculopathy.
- Whiplash and other neck pain. There is no consensus on the effectiveness of manual therapies for neck pain. A 2013 systematic review found that the data suggests that there are minimal short- and long-term treatment differences when comparing manipulation or mobilization of the cervical spine to physical therapy or exercise for neck pain improvement. A 2013 systematic review found that although there is insufficient evidence that thoracic SM is more effective than other treatments, it is a suitable intervention to treat some patients with non-specific neck pain. A 2011 systematic review found that thoracic SM may offer short-term improvement for the treatment of acute or subacute mechanical neck pain; although the body of literature is still weak. A 2010 Cochrane review found low quality evidence that suggests cervical manipulation may offer better short-term pain relief than a control for neck pain, and moderate evidence that cervical manipulation and mobilization produced similar effects on pain, function and patient satisfaction. A 2010 systematic review found low level evidence that suggests chiropractic care improves cervical range of motion and pain in the management of whiplash.
- Headache. There is no good evidence chiropractic helps with migraine.
- Extremity conditions. A 2011 systematic review and meta-analysis concluded that the addition of manual mobilizations to an exercise program for the treatment of knee osteoarthritis resulted in better pain relief than a supervised exercise program alone and suggested that manual therapists consider adding manual mobilization to optimize supervised active exercise programs. There is silver level evidence that manual therapy is more effective than exercise for the treatment of hip osteoarthritis, however this evidence could be considered to be inconclusive. There is a small amount of research into the efficacy of chiropractic treatment for upper limbs, limited to low level evidence supporting chiropractic management of shoulder pain and limited or fair evidence supporting chiropractic management of leg conditions.
- Other. A 2012 systematic review found insufficient low bias evidence to support the use of spinal manipulation as a therapy for the treatment of hypertension. A 2011 systematic review found moderate evidence to support the use of manual therapy for cervicogenic dizziness. There is very weak evidence for chiropractic care for adult scoliosis (curved or rotated spine) and no scientific data for idiopathic adolescent scoliosis. A 2007 systematic review found that few studies of chiropractic care for nonmusculoskeletal conditions are available, and they are typically not of high quality; it also found that the entire clinical encounter of chiropractic care (as opposed to just SM) provides benefit to patients with cervicogenic dizziness, and that the evidence from reviews is negative, or too weak to draw conclusions, for a wide variety of other nonmusculoskeletal conditions, including ADHD/learning disabilities, dizziness, high blood pressure, and vision conditions. Other reviews have found no evidence of significant benefit for asthma, baby colic, bedwetting, carpal tunnel syndrome, fibromyalgia, gastrointestinal disorders, kinetic imbalance due to suboccipital strain (KISS) in infants, menstrual cramps, insomnia, postmenopausal symptoms, or pelvic and back pain during pregnancy. As there is no evidence of effectiveness or safety for cervical manipulation for baby colic, it is not endorsed.

=== Safety ===
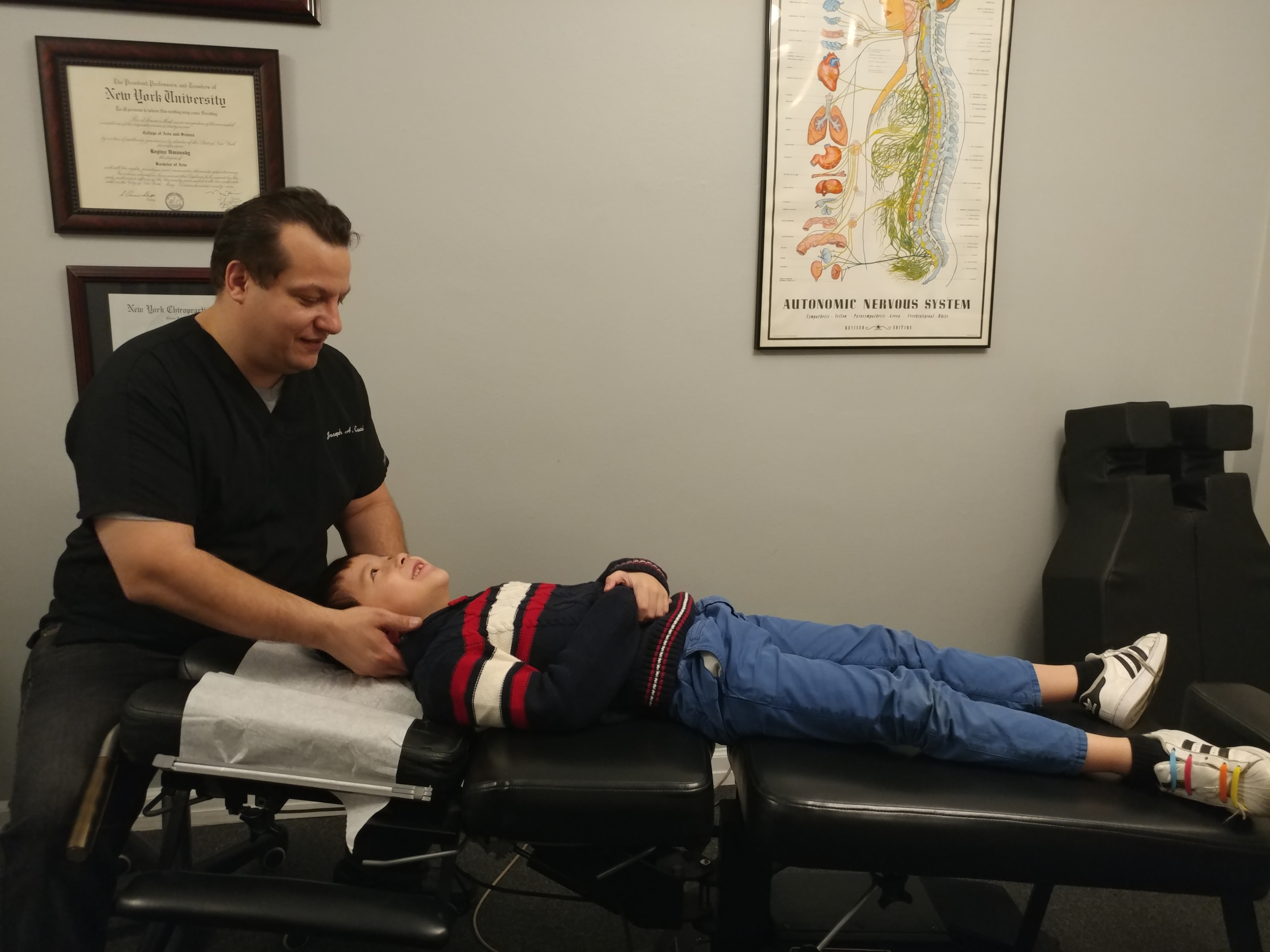
Chiropractic adjustment on a child

The World Health Organization found chiropractic care in general is safe when employed skillfully and appropriately. There are not sufficient data to establish the safety of chiropractic manipulations. Manipulation is regarded as relatively safe but complications can arise, and it has known adverse effects, risks and contraindications. Absolute contraindications to spinal manipulative therapy are conditions that should not be manipulated; these contraindications include rheumatoid arthritis and conditions known to result in unstable joints. Relative contraindications are conditions where increased risk is acceptable in some situations and where low-force and soft-tissue techniques are treatments of choice; these contraindications include osteoporosis. Although most contraindications apply only to manipulation of the affected region, some neurological signs indicate referral to emergency medical services; these include sudden and severe headache or neck pain unlike that previously experienced. Indirect risks of chiropractic involve delayed or missed diagnoses through consulting a chiropractor.

Spinal manipulation is associated with frequent, mild and temporary adverse effects, including new or worsening pain or stiffness in the affected region. They have been estimated to occur in 33% to 61% of patients, and frequently occur within an hour of treatment and disappear within 24 to 48 hours; adverse reactions appear to be more common following manipulation than mobilization. The most frequently stated adverse effects are mild headache, soreness, and briefly elevated pain fatigue. Chiropractic is correlated with a very high incidence of minor adverse effects. Rarely, spinal manipulation, particularly on the upper spine, can also result in complications that can lead to permanent disability or death; these can occur in adults and children. Estimates vary widely for the incidence of these complications, and the actual incidence is unknown, due to high levels of underreporting and to the difficulty of linking manipulation to adverse effects such as stroke, which is a particular concern. Adverse effects are poorly reported in recent studies investigating chiropractic manipulations. A 2016 systematic review concludes that the level of reporting is unsuitable and unacceptable. Reports of serious adverse events have occurred, resulting from spinal manipulation therapy of the lumbopelvic region.

==== X-rays ====
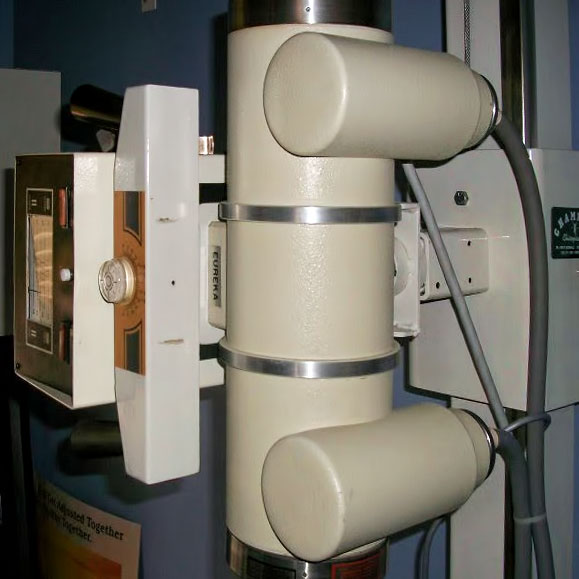
Quackwatch recommends avoiding chiropractors who use full-body x-ray radiography

The use of X-ray imaging in the case of vertebral subluxation exposes patients to harmful ionizing radiation for no evidentially supported reason. The 2008 book Trick or Treatment states "X-rays can reveal neither the subluxations nor the innate intelligence associated with chiropractic philosophy, because they do not exist."

Chiropractors sometimes employ diagnostic imaging techniques such as X-rays and CT scans that rely on ionizing radiation. Although there is no clear evidence to justify the practice, some chiropractors still X-ray a patient several times a year. Practice guidelines aim to reduce unnecessary radiation exposure, which increases cancer risk in proportion to the amount of radiation received. Research suggests that radiology instruction given at chiropractic schools worldwide seem to be evidence-based. However, there seems to be a disparity between some schools and available evidence regarding the aspect of radiography for patients with acute low back pain without an indication of a serious disease, which may contribute to chiropractic overuse of radiography for low back pain. QuackWatch cautions against seeing chiropractors who do full-body x-rays.

==== Neck manipulation ====
Estimates for serious adverse events vary from 5 strokes per 100,000 manipulations to 1.46 serious adverse events per 10 million manipulations and 2.68 deaths per 10 million manipulations, though it was determined that there were inadequate data to be conclusive. Several case reports show temporal associations between interventions and potentially serious complications. The published medical literature contains reports of 26 deaths since 1934 following chiropractic manipulations and many more seem to remain unpublished.

Vertebrobasilar artery stroke (VAS) is statistically associated with chiropractic services in persons under 45 years of age, but it is similarly associated with general practitioner services, suggesting that these associations are likely explained by preexisting conditions. Weak to moderately strong evidence supports causation (as opposed to statistical association) between cervical manipulative therapy (CMT) and VAS. There is insufficient evidence to support a strong association or no association between cervical manipulation and stroke. While the biomechanical evidence is not sufficient to support the statement that CMT causes cervical artery dissection (CD), clinical reports suggest that mechanical forces have a part in a substantial number of CDs and the majority of population controlled studies found an association between CMT and VAS in young people. It is strongly recommended that practitioners consider the plausibility of CD as a symptom, and people can be informed of the association between CD and CMT before administering manipulation of the cervical spine. There is controversy regarding the degree of risk of stroke from cervical manipulation. Many chiropractors state that the association between chiropractic therapy and vertebral arterial dissection is not proven. However, it has been suggested that the causality between chiropractic cervical manipulation beyond the normal range of motion and vascular accidents is probable or definite. There is very low evidence supporting a small association between internal carotid artery dissection and chiropractic neck manipulation. The incidence of internal carotid artery dissection following cervical spine manipulation is unknown. The literature infrequently reports helpful data to better understand the association between cervical manipulative therapy, cervical artery dissection and stroke. The limited evidence is inconclusive that chiropractic spinal manipulation therapy is not a cause of intracranial hypotension. Cervical intradural disc herniation is very rare following spinal manipulation therapy.

A 2012 systematic review concluded that no accurate assessment of risk-benefit exists for cervical manipulation. A 2010 systematic review stated that there is no good evidence to assume that neck manipulation is an effective treatment for any medical condition and suggested a precautionary principle in healthcare for chiropractic intervention even if a causality with vertebral artery dissection after neck manipulation were merely a remote possibility. The same review concluded that the risk of death from manipulations to the neck outweighs the benefits. Chiropractors have criticized this conclusion, claiming that the author did not evaluate the potential benefits of spinal manipulation. Edzard Ernst stated "This detail was not the subject of my review. I do, however, refer to such evaluations and should add that a report recently commissioned by the General Chiropractic Council did not support many of the outlandish claims made by many chiropractors across the world." A 1999 review of 177 previously reported cases published between 1925 and 1997 in which injuries were attributed to manipulation of the cervical spine (MCS) concluded that "The literature does not demonstrate that the benefits of MCS outweigh the risks." The professions associated with each injury were assessed. Physical therapists (PT) were involved in less than 2% of all cases, with no deaths caused by PTs. Chiropractors were involved in a little more than 60% of all cases, including 32 deaths.

A 2009 review evaluating maintenance chiropractic care found that spinal manipulation is associated with considerable harm and no compelling evidence exists to indicate that it adequately prevents symptoms or diseases, thus the risk-benefit is not evidently favorable.

=== Cost-effectiveness ===
A 2012 systematic review suggested that the use of spine manipulation in clinical practice is a cost-effective treatment when used alone or in combination with other treatment approaches. A 2011 systematic review found evidence supporting the cost-effectiveness of using spinal manipulation for the treatment of sub-acute or chronic low back pain; the results for acute low back pain were insufficient.

A 2006 systematic cost-effectiveness review found that the reported cost-effectiveness of spinal manipulation in the United Kingdom compared favorably with other treatments for back pain, but that reports were based on data from clinical trials without placebo controls and that the specific cost-effectiveness of the treatment (as opposed to non-specific effects) remains uncertain. A 2005 American systematic review of economic evaluations of conservative treatments for low back pain found that significant quality problems in available studies meant that definite conclusions could not be drawn about the most cost-effective intervention. The cost-effectiveness of maintenance chiropractic care is unknown.

Analysis of a clinical and cost-utilization data from the years 2003 to 2005 by an integrative medicine independent physician association (IPA) which looked the chiropractic services utilization found that the clinical and cost utilization of chiropractic services based on 70,274 member-months over a 7-year period decreased patient costs associate with the following use of services by 60% for in-hospital admissions, 59% for hospital days, 62% for outpatient surgeries and procedures, and 85% for pharmaceutical costs when compared with conventional medicine (visit to a medical doctor primary care provider) IPA performance for the same health maintenance organization product in the same geography and time frame.

== Education, licensing, and regulation ==
Requirements vary between countries. In the U.S., chiropractors obtain a non-medical, accredited diploma in chiropractic. Chiropractic education in the U.S. has been criticized for failing to meet generally accepted standards of evidence-based medicine. The curriculum content of North American chiropractic and medical colleges with regard to basic and clinical sciences has little similarity, both in the kinds of subjects offered and in the time assigned to each subject. Accredited chiropractic programs in the U.S. require that applicants have 90 semester hours of undergraduate education with a grade point average of at least 3.0 on a 4.0 scale. Many programs require at least three years of undergraduate education, and more are requiring a bachelor's degree. Canada requires a minimum of three years of undergraduate education for applicants, and at least 4200 instructional hours (or the equivalent) of full-time chiropractic education for matriculation through an accredited chiropractic program. Graduates of the Canadian Memorial Chiropractic College (CMCC) are formally recognized to have at least 7–8 years of university level education. The World Health Organization (WHO) guidelines suggest three major full-time educational paths culminating in either a DC, DCM, BSc, or MSc degree. Besides the full-time paths, they also suggest a conversion program for people with other health care education and limited training programs for regions where no legislation governs chiropractic.

Upon graduation, there may be a requirement to pass national, state, or provincial board examinations before being licensed to practice in a particular jurisdiction. Depending on the location, continuing education may be required to renew these licenses. Specialty training is available through part-time postgraduate education programs such as chiropractic orthopedics and sports chiropractic, and through full-time residency programs such as radiology or orthopedics.

In the U.S., chiropractic schools are accredited through the Council on Chiropractic Education (CCE) while the General Chiropractic Council (GCC) is the body responsible for the regulation of chiropractic in the UK. The U.S. CCE requires a mixing curriculum, which means a straight-educated chiropractor may not be eligible for licensing in states requiring CCE accreditation. CCEs in the U.S., Canada, Australia and Europe have joined to form CCE-International (CCE-I) as a model of accreditation standards with the goal of having credentials portable internationally. Today, there are 18 accredited Doctor of Chiropractic programs in the U.S., 2 in Canada, 6 in Australasia, and 5 in Europe. All but one of the chiropractic colleges in the U.S. are privately funded, but in several other countries, they are in government-sponsored universities and colleges. Of the two chiropractic colleges in Canada, one is publicly funded (UQTR), and one is privately funded (CMCC). In 2005, CMCC was granted the privilege of offering a professional health care degree under the Post-secondary Education Choice and Excellence Act, which sets the program within the hierarchy of education in Canada as comparable to that of other primary contact health care professions such as medicine, dentistry, and optometry.

Regulatory colleges and chiropractic boards in the U.S., Canada, Mexico, and Australia are responsible for protecting the public, setting standards of practice, addressing disciplinary issues, ensuring quality assurance, and maintenance of competency.

Chiropractors often argue that this education is as good as, or better than, that of medical physicians, but most chiropractic training is confined to classrooms, with much time spent on theory, adjustment, and marketing. The fourth year of chiropractic education persistently showed the highest stress levels. Every student, irrespective of year, experienced different ranges of stress when studying. The chiropractic leaders and colleges have had internal struggles. Rather than cooperation, there has been infighting between different factions. A number of actions were posturing due to the confidential nature of the chiropractic colleges in an attempt to enroll students.

In 2024, Oregon Public Broadcasting reported on the high debt burden of students who pursued degrees in alternative medicine. Ten different chiropractic programs were ranked among the 47 US graduate programs with the highest debt-to-earnings ratios. Analyses by Quackwatch and the Sunlight Foundation found high rates of default on Health Education Assistance Loan (HEAL) student loans used for chiropractic programs. Among health professionals who were listed as in default on HEAL loans in 2012, 53% were chiropractors.

=== Ethics ===
The chiropractic oath is a modern variation of the classical Hippocratic Oath historically taken by physicians and other healthcare professionals swearing to practice their professions ethically. The American Chiropractic Association (ACA) has an ethical code "based upon the acknowledgement that the social contract dictates the profession's responsibilities to the patient, the public, and the profession; and upholds the fundamental principle that the paramount purpose of the chiropractic doctor's professional services shall be to benefit the patient." The International Chiropractor's Association (ICA) also has a set of professional canons.

A 2008 commentary proposed that the chiropractic profession actively regulate itself to combat abuse, fraud, and quackery, which are more prevalent in chiropractic than in other health care professions, violating the social contract between patients and physicians. According to a 2015 Gallup poll of U.S. adults, the perception of chiropractors is generally favorable; two-thirds of American adults agree that chiropractors have their patients' best interest in mind, and more than half also agree that most chiropractors are trustworthy. Less than 10% of US adults disagreed with the statement that chiropractors were trustworthy.

The charity Sense about Science launched a campaign to draw attention to the BCA legal case against science writer Simon Singh. In 2009, a number of organizations and public figures signed a statement entitled "The law has no place in scientific disputes".

Chiropractors, especially in America, have a reputation for unnecessarily treating patients. In many circumstances, the focus seems to be on economics instead of health care. Sustained chiropractic care is promoted as a preventive tool, but unnecessary manipulation could possibly present a risk to patients. Some chiropractors are concerned by the routine, unjustified claims chiropractors have made. A 2010 analysis of chiropractic websites found the majority of chiropractors and their associations made claims of effectiveness not supported by scientific evidence, while 28% of chiropractor websites advocate lower back pain care, which has some sound evidence.

The US Office of the Inspector General (OIG) estimated that for calendar year 2013, 82% of payments to chiropractors under Medicare Part B, a total of $359 million, did not comply with Medicare requirements. There have been at least 15 OIG reports about chiropractic billing irregularities since 1986.

In 2009, a backlash to the libel suit filed by the British Chiropractic Association (BCA) against Simon Singh inspired the filing of formal complaints of false advertising against more than 500 individual chiropractors within one 24-hour period, prompting the McTimoney Chiropractic Association to write to its members advising them to remove leaflets that make claims about whiplash and colic from their practice, to be wary of new patients and telephone inquiries, and telling their members: "If you have a website, take it down NOW" and "Finally, we strongly suggest you do NOT discuss this with others, especially patients." An editorial in Nature suggested that the BCA may have been trying to suppress debate and that this use of English libel law was a burden on the right to freedom of expression, which is protected by the European Convention on Human Rights. The libel case ended with the BCA withdrawing its suit in 2010.

== Reception ==
Chiropractic is established in the U.S., Canada, and Australia, and is present to a lesser extent in many other countries. It is viewed as a marginal and non-clinically–proven attempt at complementary and alternative medicine, which has not integrated into mainstream medicine.

=== Australia ===
In Australia, there are approximately 2488 chiropractors, or one chiropractor for every 7980 people. Most private health insurance funds in Australia cover chiropractic care, and the federal government funds chiropractic care when the patient is referred by a medical practitioner. In 2014, the chiropractic profession had a registered workforce of 4,684 practitioners in Australia represented by two major organizations – the Chiropractors' Association of Australia (CAA) and the Chiropractic and Osteopathic College of Australasia (COCA). Annual expenditure on chiropractic care (alone or combined with osteopathy) in Australia is estimated to be between AUD$750–988 million with musculoskeletal complaints such as back and neck pain making up the bulk of consultations; and proportional expenditure is similar to that found in other countries. While Medicare (the Australian publicly funded universal health care system) coverage of chiropractic services is limited to only those directed by a medical referral to assist chronic disease management, most private health insurers in Australia do provide partial reimbursement for a wider range of chiropractic services in addition to limited third party payments for workers compensation and motor vehicle accidents.

Of the 2,005 chiropractors who participated in a 2015 survey, 62.4% were male and the average age was 42.1 (SD = 12.1) years. Nearly all chiropractors (97.1%) had a bachelor's degree or higher, with the majority of chiropractor's highest professional qualification being a bachelor or double bachelor's degree (34.6%), followed by a master's degree (32.7%), Doctor of Chiropractic (28.9%) or PhD (0.9%). Only a small number of chiropractor's highest professional qualification was a diploma (2.1%) or advanced diploma (0.8%).

=== Germany ===
In Germany, chiropractic may be offered by medical doctors and alternative practitioners. Chiropractors qualified abroad must obtain a German non-medical practitioner license. Authorities have routinely required a comprehensive knowledge test for this, but in the recent past, some administrative courts have ruled that training abroad should be recognised.

=== Switzerland ===
In Switzerland, only trained medical professionals are allowed to offer chiropractic. Since 1995, chiropractors have been licensed to prescribe a limited set of pharmaceuticals, which were expanded in 2018. A 2010 survey found that 72% of Swiss chiropractors considered their ability to prescribe nonprescription medication as an advantage for chiropractic treatment.

There are approximately 300 chiropractors in Switzerland.

=== United Kingdom ===
Chiropractic is available on the National Health Service in some areas, such as Cornwall, where the treatment is only available for neck or back pain.

A 2010 study by questionnaire presented to UK chiropractors indicated only 45% of chiropractors disclosed to patients the serious risk associated with manipulation of the cervical spine and that 46% believed there was possibility patients would refuse treatment if the risks were correctly explained. However 80% acknowledged the ethical/moral responsibility to disclose risk to patients.

=== United States and Canada ===
In 2025, the American Chiropractic Association reported that 70,000 practitioners were active in the United States. The percentage of the population that utilizes chiropractic care at any given time generally falls into a range from 6% to 12% in the U.S. and Canada, with a global high of 20% in Alberta in 2006. In 2008, chiropractors were reported to be the most common CAM providers for children and adolescents, these patients representing up to 14% of all visits to chiropractors. A 2022 report found 11% of Americans visit a chiropractor.

In 2002–03, the majority of those who sought chiropractic did so for relief from back and neck pain and other neuromusculoskeletal complaints; most do so specifically for low back pain. The majority of U.S. chiropractors participate in some form of managed care. Although the majority of U.S. chiropractors view themselves as specialists in neuromusculoskeletal conditions, many also consider chiropractic as a type of primary care. In the majority of cases, the care that chiropractors and physicians provide divides the market, however for some, their care is complementary.

In the U.S., chiropractors perform over 90% of all manipulative treatments. Satisfaction rates are typically higher for chiropractic care compared to medical care, with a 1998 U.S. survey reporting 83% of respondents satisfied or very satisfied with their care; quality of communication seems to be a consistent predictor of patient satisfaction with chiropractors.

Utilization of chiropractic care is sensitive to the costs incurred by the co-payment by the patient. The use of chiropractic declined from 9.9% of U.S. adults in 1997 to 7.4% in 2002; this was the largest relative decrease among CAM professions, which overall had a stable use rate. As of 2007 7% of the U.S. population is being reached by chiropractic. They were the third largest medical profession in the US in 2002, following physicians and dentists. Employment of U.S. chiropractors was expected to increase 14% between 2006 and 2016, faster than the average for all occupations.

Since 1972, chiropractic treatment of the spine has been covered by Medicare, the US federal health insurance program in the United States. In 1974 the United States Commissioner of Education officially listed the Council on Chiropractic Education as a "Nationally Recognized Accrediting Agency". This allowed for eligibility for federal education and research grants, student eligibility for federal loans, and gave increased legitimacy for chiropractic as a profession overall. In 1980, the American Medical Association revised its code of ethics, allowing members to provide referrals to chiropractors.

Modernly, chiropractors often work in collaboration with primary care physicians and other medical specialists; the American College of Physicians recommends spinal manipulation therapy as an alternative to pain-relieving drugs for low back pain. Most states require insurers to cover chiropractic care, and most HMOs cover these services.

Chiropractors are not normally licensed to write medical prescriptions or perform major surgery in the United States (although New Mexico has become the first US state to allow "advanced practice" trained chiropractors to prescribe certain medications). In the US, their scope of practice varies by state, based on inconsistent views of chiropractic care: some states, such as Iowa, broadly allow treatment of "human ailments"; some, such as Delaware, use vague concepts such as "transition of nerve energy" to define scope of practice; others, such as New Jersey, specify a severely narrowed scope. US states also differ over whether chiropractors may conduct laboratory tests or diagnostic procedures, dispense dietary supplements, or use other therapies such as homeopathy and acupuncture; in Oregon they can become certified to perform minor surgery and to deliver children via natural childbirth. A 2003 survey of North American chiropractors found that a slight majority favored allowing them to write prescriptions for over-the-counter drugs.

In 2024, the University of Pittsburgh announced a Doctor of Chiropractic program—the first of its kind at a public research intensive university.

== History ==
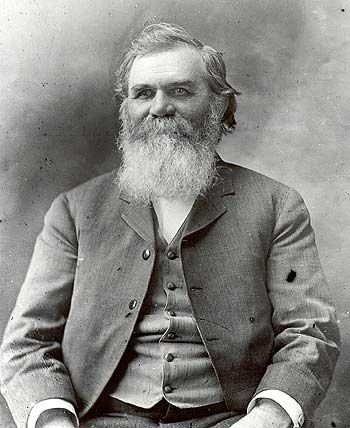
Daniel David (D. D.) Palmer, founder of chiropractic

Chiropractic's origins lie in the folk medicine practice of bonesetting, in which untrained practitioners engaged in joint manipulation or resetting fractured bones. Chiropractic was founded in 1895 by Daniel David (D. D.) Palmer in Davenport, Iowa. Palmer, a magnetic healer, hypothesized that manual manipulation of the spine could cure disease. The first chiropractic patient of D. D. Palmer was Harvey Lillard, a worker in the building where Palmer's office was located. He claimed that he had severely reduced hearing for 17 years, which started shortly following a "pop" in his spine. A few days following his adjustment, Lillard claimed his hearing was almost completely restored. Another of Palmer's patients, Samuel Weed, coined the term chiropractic, from Greek χειρο- chiro- 'hand' (itself from χείρ cheir 'hand') and πρακτικός praktikos 'practical'. Chiropractic is classified as a field of pseudomedicine.

Chiropractic competed with its predecessor osteopathy, another medical system based on magnetic healing; both systems were founded by charismatic midwesterners in opposition to the conventional medicine of the day, and both postulated that manipulation improved health. Although initially keeping chiropractic a family secret, in 1898 Palmer began teaching it to a few students at his new Palmer School of Chiropractic. One student, his son Bartlett Joshua (B. J.) Palmer, became committed to promoting chiropractic, took over the Palmer School in 1906, and rapidly expanded its enrollment. His son B. J. Palmer helped to expand chiropractic in the early 20th century.

Early chiropractors believed that all disease was caused by interruptions in the flow of innate intelligence, a vitalistic nervous energy or life force that represented God's presence in man; chiropractic leaders often invoked religious imagery and moral traditions. D. D. Palmer said he "received chiropractic from the other world". D. D. and B. J. both seriously considered declaring chiropractic a religion, which might have provided legal protection under the U.S. constitution, but decided against it partly to avoid confusion with Christian Science. Early chiropractors also tapped into the Populist movement, emphasizing craft, hard work, competition, and advertisement, aligning themselves with the common man against intellectuals and trusts, among which they included the American Medical Association (AMA).

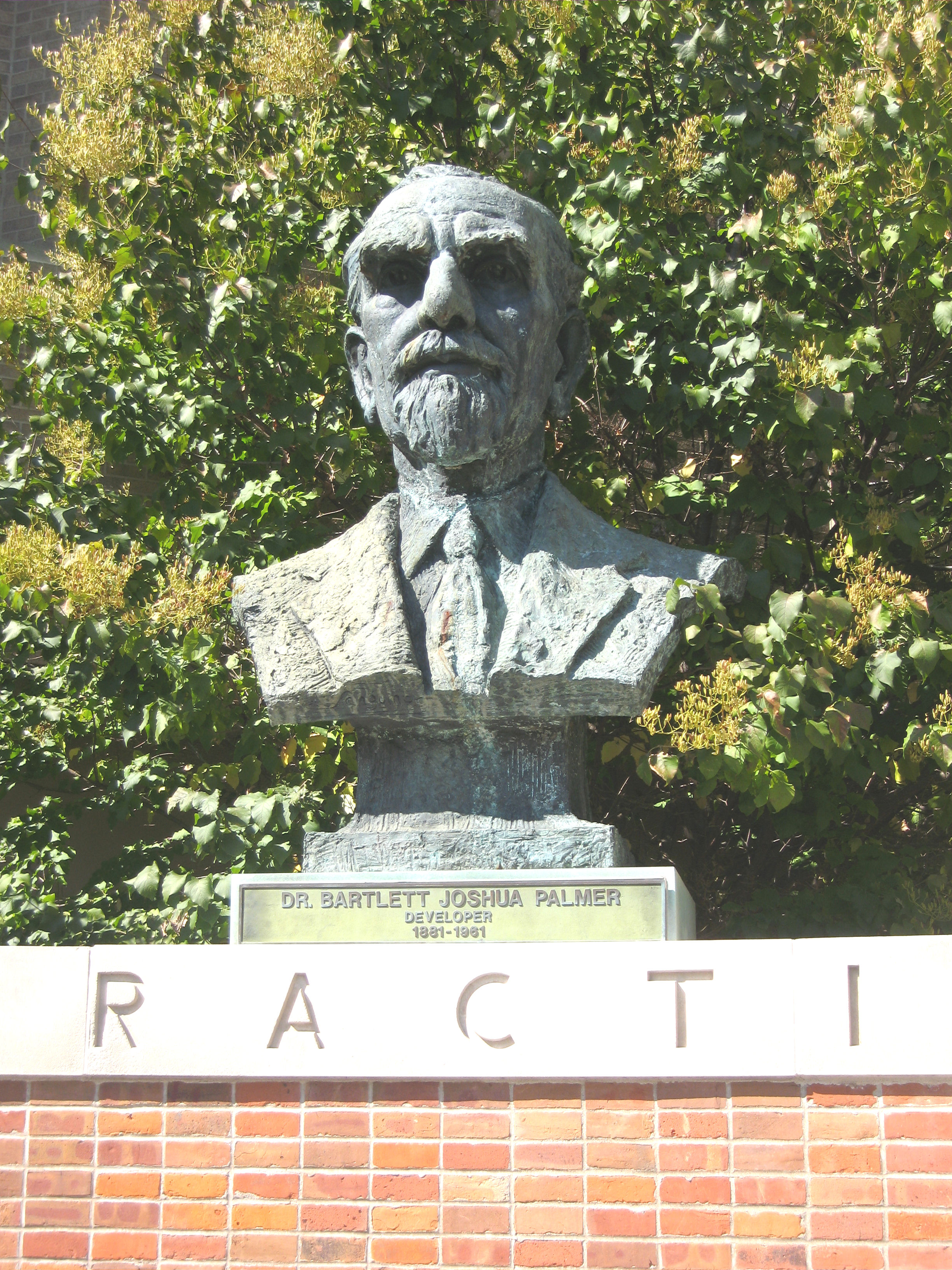
B. J. Palmer, early developer of chiropractic

Chiropractic has seen considerable controversy and criticism. Although D. D. and B. J. were "straight" and disdained the use of instruments, some early chiropractors, whom B. J. scornfully called "mixers", advocated the use of instruments. In 1910, B. J. changed course and endorsed X-rays as necessary for diagnosis; this resulted in a significant exodus from the Palmer School of the more conservative faculty and students. The mixer camp grew until by 1924 B. J. estimated that only 3,000 of the United States' 25,000 chiropractors remained straight. That year, B. J.'s invention and promotion of the neurocalometer, a temperature-sensing device, was highly controversial among B. J.'s fellow straights. By the 1930s, chiropractic was the largest alternative healing profession in the U.S.

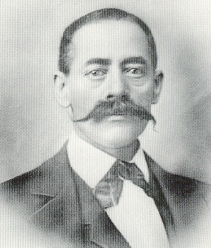
Harvey Lillard, first chiropractic patient

Chiropractors faced heavy opposition from organized medicine. D. D. Palmer was jailed in 1907 for practicing medicine without a license. Thousands of chiropractors were prosecuted for practicing medicine without a license, and D. D. and many other chiropractors were jailed. To defend against medical statutes, B. J. argued that chiropractic was separate and distinct from medicine, asserting that chiropractors "analyzed" rather than "diagnosed", and "adjusted" subluxations rather than "treated" disease. B. J. cofounded the Universal Chiropractors' Association (UCA) to provide legal services to arrested chiropractors. Although the UCA won their first test case in Wisconsin in 1907, prosecutions instigated by state medical boards became increasingly common and in many cases were successful. In response, chiropractors conducted political campaigns to secure separate licensing statutes, eventually succeeding in all fifty states, from Kansas in 1913 through Louisiana in 1974. The longstanding feud between chiropractors and medical doctors continued for decades.

Chiropractic philosophy includes the following perspectives:

Holism assumes that health is affected by everything in an individual's environment; some sources also include a spiritual or existential dimension. In contrast, reductionism in chiropractic reduces causes and cures of health problems to a single factor, vertebral subluxation. Homeostasis emphasizes the body's inherent self-healing abilities. Chiropractic's early notion of innate intelligence can be thought of as a metaphor for homeostasis.

A large number of chiropractors fear that if they do not separate themselves from the traditional vitalistic concept of innate intelligence, chiropractic will continue to be seen as a fringe profession. A variant of chiropractic called naprapathy originated in Chicago in the early twentieth century. It holds that manual manipulation of soft tissue can reduce "interference" in the body and thus improve health.

=== Straights (Vitalists) versus Mixers (Materialists) ===
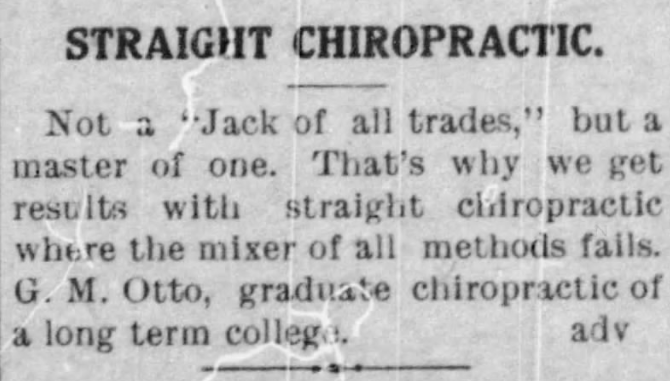
1914 advertisement for a Straight Chiropractic as opposed to a Mixer Chiropractic

By 1914, chiropractors had begun to divide into two groups: "Straights", adherents of the Palmers' supernatural vitalist beliefs, and "Mixers" who sought to integrate Chiropractic into science-based mainstream medicine.

Range of belief perspectives in chiropractic
| Perspective attribute | Potential belief endpoints | |
|---|---|---|
| Scope of practice: | narrow ("straight") ← | → broad ("mixer") |
| Philosophic orientation: | vitalistic ← | → materialistic |
| Falsifiability: | untestable Cannot be proven or disproven | testable Lends itself to scientific inquiry |
Taken from Mootz & Phillips 1997

Originally, Straight chiropractors adhered to pseudoscientific Vitalist ideas set forth by D. D. and B. J. Palmer, and even modern "straights" often retain metaphysical definitions and vitalistic qualities. Straight chiropractors believed that vertebral subluxation leads to interference with an "innate intelligence" exerted via the human nervous system and is a primary underlying risk factor for many diseases. Straights view the medical diagnosis of patient complaints, which they consider to be the "secondary effects" of subluxations, to be unnecessary for chiropractic treatment. Thus, straight chiropractors are concerned primarily with the detection and correction of vertebral subluxation via adjustment and do not "mix" other types of therapies into their practice style. Their philosophy and explanations were metaphysical in nature, and they preferred to use traditional chiropractic lexicon terminology such as "perform spinal analysis", "detect subluxation", "correct with adjustment". They preferred to remain separate and distinct from mainstream health care. Modernly, "Straights" are a minority among Chiropractors, though "they have been able to transform their status as purists and heirs of the lineage into influence dramatically out of proportion to their numbers."

Mixers, who make up the majority of chiropractors, "mix" chiropractic with diagnostic and treatment approaches from mainstream medical and osteopathic practices. Unlike straight chiropractors, mixers believe subluxation is just one of many causes of disease, and mixers are open to mainstream medicine. Many mixers incorporate mainstream medical diagnostics and employ conventional medical treatments including techniques of physical therapy such as exercise, stretching, massage, ice packs, electrical muscle stimulation, therapeutic ultrasound, and moist heat. But some mixers also use techniques from pseudoscientific alternative medicine, including unnecessary nutritional supplements, acupuncture, homeopathy, herbal remedies, and biofeedback. Author Holly Folk writes that "Few Mixer chiropractors use the term anymore. Today, one is more likely to hear this side described as 'holistic,' 'wellness-oriented,' or 'integrative' practitioners." Folk argues that "osteopathy underwent a 'Straight-Mixer' debate between traditional vitalists and a faction that embraced the new medical science".

Although mixers are the majority group, many of them retain belief in vertebral subluxation as shown in a 2003 survey of 1,100 North American chiropractors, which found that 88% wanted to retain the term "vertebral subluxation complex", and that when asked to estimate the per cent of disorders of internal organs that subluxation significantly contributes to, the mean response was 62%. A 2008 survey of 6,000 American chiropractors demonstrated that most chiropractors seem to believe that a subluxation-based clinical approach may be of limited utility for addressing visceral disorders, and greatly favored non-subluxation-based clinical approaches for such conditions. The same survey showed that most chiropractors generally believed that the majority of their clinical approach for addressing musculoskeletal/biomechanical disorders such as back pain was based on subluxation. Chiropractors often offer conventional therapies such as physical therapy and lifestyle counseling, and it may for the lay person be difficult to distinguish the unscientific from the scientific.

=== Restraint of trade decision 1989 ===
The AMA labeled chiropractic an "unscientific cult" in 1966, and until 1980 advised its members that it was unethical for medical doctors to associate with "unscientific practitioners". This culminated in a landmark 1987 decision, Wilk v. AMA, in which the court found that the AMA had engaged in unreasonable restraint of trade and conspiracy, and which ended the AMA's de facto boycott of chiropractic.

=== Growing scholarly interest ===
Serious research to test chiropractic theories did not begin until the 1970s, and is continuing to be hampered by antiscientific and pseudoscientific ideas that sustained the profession in its long battle with organized medicine. By the mid-1990s there was a growing scholarly interest in chiropractic, which helped efforts to improve service quality and establish clinical guidelines that recommended manual therapies for acute low back pain.

In recent decades chiropractic gained legitimacy and greater acceptance by medical physicians and health plans, and enjoyed a strong political base and sustained demand for services. However, its future seemed uncertain: as the number of practitioners grew, evidence-based medicine insisted on treatments with demonstrated value, managed care restricted payment, and competition grew from massage therapists and other health professions. The profession responded by marketing natural products and devices more aggressively, and by reaching deeper into alternative medicine and primary care.

== Public health ==
Some chiropractors oppose vaccination and water fluoridation, which are common public health practices. Within the chiropractic community there are significant disagreements about vaccination, one of the most cost-effective public health interventions available. Most chiropractic writings on vaccination focus on its negative aspects, claiming that it is hazardous, ineffective, and unnecessary. Some chiropractors have embraced vaccination, but a significant portion of the profession rejects it, as original chiropractic philosophy traces diseases to causes in the spine and states that vaccines interfere with healing. The extent to which anti-vaccination views perpetuate the current chiropractic profession is uncertain. The American Chiropractic Association and the International Chiropractors Association support individual exemptions to compulsory vaccination laws, and a 1995 survey of U.S. chiropractors found that about a third believed there was no scientific proof that immunization prevents disease. The Canadian Chiropractic Association supports vaccination; a survey in Alberta in 2002 found that 25% of chiropractors advised patients for, and 27% against, vaccinating themselves or their children.

Early opposition to water fluoridation included chiropractors, some of whom continue to oppose it as being incompatible with chiropractic philosophy and an infringement of personal freedom. Other chiropractors have actively promoted fluoridation, and several chiropractic organizations have endorsed scientific principles of public health. In addition to traditional chiropractic opposition to water fluoridation and vaccination, chiropractors' attempts to establish a positive reputation for their public health role are also compromised by their reputation for recommending repetitive lifelong chiropractic treatment.

== Controversy ==
Throughout its history chiropractic has been the subject of internal and external controversy and criticism. According to Daniel D. Palmer, the founder of chiropractic, subluxation is the sole cause of disease and manipulation is the cure for all diseases of the human race. A 2003 profession-wide survey found "most chiropractors (whether 'straights' or 'mixers') still hold views of innate intelligence and of the cause and cure of disease (not just back pain) consistent with those of the Palmers." A critical evaluation stated "Chiropractic is rooted in mystical concepts. This led to an internal conflict within the chiropractic profession, which continues today." Chiropractors, including D. D. Palmer, were jailed for practicing medicine without a license. For most of its existence, chiropractic has battled with mainstream medicine, sustained by antiscientific and pseudoscientific ideas such as subluxation. Collectively, systematic reviews have not demonstrated that spinal manipulation, the main treatment method employed by chiropractors, is effective for any medical condition, with the possible exception of treatment for back pain. Chiropractic remains controversial, though to a lesser extent than in past years.

== See also ==
- Chiropractic education
- Chiropractic schools
- Councils on Chiropractic Education International
- List of topics characterized as pseudoscience
- Toftness device
- World Federation of Chiropractic
