= American Chiropractic Association =

- Formation: 1963
- Headquarters: Arlington, Virginia, U.S.
- Members: c. 15,000 doctors of chiropractic and chiropractic students
- Key people: Executive Vice President Karen Silberman; President Michael Martin, DC; Vice President Marcus Nynas, DC
- Website: www.acatoday.org

The American Chiropractic Association (ACA), based in Arlington, Virginia, is an organization that promotes the pseudoscientific (Note: See the primary article on chiropractic for more citations supporting this claim.) concept of chiropractic and its practitioners.

== Purpose and mission ==
The stated mission of the ACA is to improve the health of its members and communities with chiropractic. For their mission, the ACA works with chiropractic professionals, supports pro-chiropractic legislation and policies, and supports research for treatment practices. The ACA also provides professional and educational opportunities for its members.

== Overview ==
The American Chiropractic Association was founded in 1922, and in 1930 merged with the Universal Chiropractors Association to form the National Chiropractic Association (NCA). In 1963, the NCA was reorganized, once again under the title of the American Chiropractic Association.

The House of Delegates (HOD), the deliberative body of the Association, is composed of 124 delegates representing all 50 states, the ACA Board of Governors, the ACA’s specialty councils, the Faculty American Chiropractic Association (FACA), the Student American Chiropractic Association (SACA) and ACA's state affiliates. The HOD meets once per year in person during the association’s annual meeting, usually held in the first quarter of the year.

ACA formally recognizes 12 specialty areas of chiropractic practice through its specialty councils:

- Council on Diagnostic Imaging (DACBR)
- Council on Physiotherapy and Rehabilitation (the Rehab Council) (DACRB)
- Council on Chiropractic Acupuncture (DABCA)
- Council on Nutrition (DACBN/CBCN)
- Council on Diagnosis and Internal Disorders (DABCI)
- Council on Chiropractic Orthopedics (DACO/DABCO)
- Council on Neurology (DACAN/DACNB/DIACN)
- Chiropractic Sports Council (DACBSP)
- Council on Chiropractic Pediatrics (DICCP)
- Council on Occupational Health (DACBOH)
- Council on Forensic Sciences (DABFP)
- Council on Women's Health

The official research journal of ACA is Journal of Manipulative and Physiological Therapeutics (JMPT), which is owned by the National University of Health Sciences and published by Elsevier.

The American Chiropractic Foundation is the charitable arm of the association. The Foundation provides grants for research, education, and scholarships.

== History ==
The American Chiropractic Association (ACA) is an organizational descendant of one of the first national chiropractic membership societies, the Universal Chiropractors Association (UCA), which was established at the Palmer School of Chiropractic in 1906. ACA as we know it today was founded in 1963, with the merger of the National Chiropractic Association and a splinter group from another national association. Over its history, ACA and its predecessors were responsible for establishing some of the profession's most important foundational organizations in the areas of chiropractic research and education.
