= List of radio stations in Iowa =

The following is a list of FCC-licensed radio stations in the U.S. state of Iowa, which can be sorted by their call signs, frequencies, cities of license, licensees, and programming formats.

== List of radio stations ==
Call sign	Frequency	City of license	Licensee	Format
KACJ-LP	97.5 FM	Cedar Rapids	Friendship Baptist Church	Religious Teaching
KADR	1400 AM	Elkader	Design Homes, Inc.	Adult contemporary
KAIP	88.9 FM	Wapello	Educational Media Foundation	Worship music (Air1)
KALA	88.5 FM	Davenport	Saint Ambrose College	Variety
KASI	1430 AM	Ames	iHM Licenses, LLC	News/Talk
KATF	92.9 FM	Dubuque	Radio Dubuque, Inc.	Adult contemporary
KAYL	990 AM	Storm Lake	Community First Broadcasting, LLC	Regional Mexican
KAYL-FM	101.7 FM	Storm Lake	Community First Broadcasting, LLC	Hot adult contemporary
KAYP	89.9 FM	Burlington	American Family Association	Inspirational (AFR)
KAZR	103.3 FM	Pella	Saga Communications of Iowa, LLC	Mainstream rock
KBBG	88.1 FM	Waterloo	Afro American Community Broadcasting, Inc.	Variety
KBDC	88.5 FM	Mason City	American Family Association	Inspirational (AFR)
KBDJ-LP	97.1 FM	Waterloo	Humanity's Hope Foundation, Inc.	Urban contemporary
KBEA-FM	99.7 FM	Muscatine	Townsquare License, LLC	Adult top 40
KBIZ	1240 AM	Ottumwa	O-Town Communications, Inc.	News/Talk
KBKB	1360 AM	Fort Madison	Pritchard Broadcasting Corporation	Sports (FSR)
KBKB-FM	101.7 FM	Fort Madison	Titan Broadcasting, LLC	Country
KBOE-FM	104.9 FM	Oskaloosa	Jomast Corporation	Country
KBUR	1490 AM	Burlington	Pritchard Broadcasting Corporation	News/Talk
KBVU-FM	97.5 FM	Alta	Buena Vista University	Alternative
KCCK-FM	88.3 FM	Cedar Rapids	Kirkwood Community College	Jazz
KCDM-LP	98.3 FM	Burlington	Burlington Educational Association	Catholic
KCFI	1250 AM	Cedar Falls	Coloff Media, LLC	Oldies
KCHA	1580 AM	Charles City	Coloff Media, LLC	Oldies
KCHA-FM	95.9 FM	Charles City	Coloff Media, LLC	Variety
KCHE	1440 AM	Cherokee	Better Broadcasting Incorporated	Country
KCHE-FM	92.1 FM	Cherokee	Better Broadcasting Incorporated	Classic hits
KCII	1380 AM	Washington	Home Broadcasting, Inc.	Classic hits/News
KCII-FM	106.1 FM	Washington	Home Broadcasting, Inc.	Classic hits/News
KCIM	1380 AM	Carroll	Carroll Broadcasting Company	Classic hits
KCJA	89.5 FM	Conway	Calvary Chapel Clarinda, Inc.	Religious
KCJJ	1630 AM	Iowa City	River City Radio, Inc.	Hot adult contemporary
KCLN	1390 AM	Clinton	Gendreau Broadcast LLC	Oldies
KCMR	97.9 FM	Mason City	TLC Broadcasting Corporation	Christian
KCNZ	1650 AM	Cedar Falls	Coloff Media, LLC	Sports (FSR)
KCOB	1280 AM	Newton	Alpha Media Licensee LLC	Silent
KCOB-FM	95.9 FM	Newton	Alpha Media Licensee LLC	Silent
KCOG	1400 AM	Centerville	KCOG, Inc.	Oldies
KCPS	1150 AM	Burlington	John M. Giannettino	News/Talk
KCQQ	106.5 FM	Davenport	iHM Licenses, LLC	Classic hits
KCRD-LP	98.3 FM	Dubuque	Aquinas Communications, Inc.	Catholic
KCRM-LP	96.7 FM	Marshalltown	Marshalltown Association For Catholic Education & Evangel	Catholic
KCRR	97.7 FM	Grundy Center	Townsquare License, LLC	Classic rock
KCSI	95.3 FM	Villisca	Hawkeye Communications, Inc.	Country
KCSL	89.9 FM	Spencer	St. Gabriel Communications	Catholic
KCTN	100.1 FM	Garnavillo	Design Homes, Inc.	Country
KCVD	88.1 FM	Des Moines	Community Broadcasting, Inc.	Religious
KCVM	93.5 FM	Hudson	Coloff Media, LLC	Hot adult contemporary
KCWN	99.9 FM	New Sharon	Crown Broadcasting Company	contemporary Christian
KCYZ	105.1 FM	Ames	iHM Licenses, LLC	Hot adult contemporary
KCZE	95.1 FM	New Hampton	Coloff Media, LLC	Country
KCZQ	102.3 FM	Cresco	Mega Media, Ltd.	Oldies
KDAO	1190 AM	Marshalltown	MTN Broadcasting, Inc.	Oldies
KDAO-FM	92.9 FM	Eldora	Eldora Broadcasting Company	1990s hits
KDAT	104.5 FM	Cedar Rapids	Townsquare License, LLC	Adult contemporary
KDEC	1240 AM	Decorah	Wennes Communications Stations, Inc.	Adult contemporary
KDFR	91.3 FM	Des Moines	Family Stations, Inc.	Religious
KDHK	100.5 FM	Decorah	Wennes Communications Stations, Inc.	Hot adult contemporary
KDLF	1260 AM	Boone	Latin World Broadcasting, Inc.	Spanish
KDLS	1310 AM	Perry	Coon Valley Communications, Inc.	Adult contemporary
KDLS-FM	105.5 FM	Perry	Trinity Communications, Inc.	Regional Mexican
KDLX	1150 AM	Des Moines	KDLX Latin Broadcasting, LLC	Regional Mexican
KDME-LP	98.3 FM	Fort Madison	Divine Mercy Educational Radio Association	Catholic
KDMG	103.1 FM	Burlington	Pritchard Broadcasting Corporation	Country
KDNH-LP	101.5 FM	Marshalltown	K. of C. Building, Inc.	Spanish Catholic
KDRB	100.3 FM	Des Moines	iHM Licenses, LLC	Adult hits
KDSN	1530 AM	Denison	Crawford County Broadcasting Corp.	Variety
KDSN-FM	104.9 FM	Denison	Crawford County Broadcasting Corp.	Adult contemporary
KDST	99.3 FM	Dyersville	Design Homes, Inc.	Country
KDTH	1370 AM	Dubuque	Radio Dubuque, Inc.	Adult standards/MOR
KDVM	89.3 FM	Mason City	St. Gabriel Communications	Religious
KEWR-FM	89.9 FM	Cedar Rapids	Calvary Chapel Iowa	Religious
KFJB	1230 AM	Marshalltown	Trending Media, Inc.	News/Talk
KFMG-LP	98.9 FM	Des Moines	The Des Moines Community Radio Foundation	Variety
KFMW	107.9 FM	Waterloo	NRG License Sub, LLC	Active rock
KFOM	88.7 FM	Stanton	Calvary Chapel Clarinda, Inc.	Religious
KGGO	94.9 FM	Des Moines	Radio License Holding CBC, LLC	Classic rock
KGLI	95.5 FM	Sioux City	iHM Licenses, LLC	Adult contemporary
KGLO	1300 AM	Mason City	Digity 3E License, LLC	News/Talk
KGRA	98.9 FM	Jefferson	Coon Valley Communications, Inc.	Country
KGRN	1410 AM	Grinnell	Alpha Media Licensee LLC	Silent
KGRR	97.3 FM	Epworth	Radio Dubuque, Inc.	Active rock
KGRS	107.3 FM	Burlington	Titan Broadcasting, LLC	Hot adult contemporary
KGYM	1600 AM	Cedar Rapids	KZIA, Inc.	Sports (ESPN)
KGYS-LP	92.5 FM	Dewitt	DeWitt Educational Association	Catholic
KHAK	98.1 FM	Cedar Rapids	Townsquare License, LLC	Country
KHAM	103.1 FM	Britt	Coloff Media, LLC	Adult contemporary
KHBT	97.7 FM	Humboldt	Open Roads Media, L.L.C.	Adult contemporary
KHDK	97.3 FM	New London	Pritchard Broadcasting Corporation	Top 40 (CHR)
KHFR-LP	103.5 FM	Keosauqua	St. Mary Radio dba Radio Apostolate for IA the Heartland	Catholic
KHIJ-LP	106.3 FM	Ottumwa	Ottumwa Seventh-day Adventist Church	Christian
KHKE	89.5 FM	Cedar Falls	Iowa Public Radio, Inc.	Iowa Public Radio & Classical
KHKI	97.3 FM	Des Moines	Radio License Holding CBC, LLC	Country
KHLW	89.3 FM	Tabor	Calvary Chapel of Omaha	Religious
KHOE	90.5 FM	Fairfield	Fairfield Educational Radio Station	Variety
KHOI	89.1 FM	Story City	KHOI FM	Community radio
KIAD	88.5 FM	Dubuque	American Family Association	Inspirational (AFR)
KIAI	93.9 FM	Mason City	Digity 3E License, LLC	Country
KIAQ	96.9 FM	Clarion	Digity 3E License, LLC	Country
KICB	88.1 FM	Fort Dodge	Iowa Central Community College	Alternative
KICD	1240 AM	Spencer	Saga Communications of Iowa, LLC	News/Talk
KICD-FM	107.7 FM	Spencer	Saga Communications of Iowa, LLC	Country
KICG	91.7 FM	Perry	Iowa Public Radio, Inc.	Iowa Public Radio & Classical
KICI-LP	105.3 FM	Iowa City	Extend the Dream Foundation, Inc.	Top 40 (CHR)/Modern AC
KICL	96.3 FM	Pleasantville	Iowa Public Radio, Inc.	Iowa Public Radio & Classical
KICP	105.9 FM	Patterson	Iowa Public Radio, Inc.	Iowa Public Radio & Classical
KICW	91.1 FM	Ottumwa	Iowa Public Radio, Inc.	Iowa Public Radio & Classical
KIFG	1510 AM	Iowa Falls	Times-Citizen Communications, Inc.	Classic hits
KIFG-FM	95.3 FM	Iowa Falls	Times-Citizen Communications, Inc.	Classic hits
KIHC-FM	105.3 FM	Chariton	St. Gabriel Communications	Catholic
KIHK	106.9 FM	Rock Valley	Community First Broadcasting, LLC	Country
KIHS	105.5 FM	Perry	St. Gabriel Communications	Religious
KIIC	96.7 FM	Albia	Waveguide Communications Inc.	Country
KIIK-FM	104.9 FM	De Witt	Townsquare License, LLC	Country
KIKD	106.7 FM	Lake City	Carroll Broadcasting Company	Country
KILJ	1130 AM	Mount Pleasant	KILJ, Inc.	Country
KILJ-FM	105.5 FM	Mount Pleasant	KILJ, Inc.	Easy listening
KILR	1070 AM	Estherville	Beaver Broadcasting, Inc.	News/Talk
KILR-FM	95.9 FM	Estherville	Beaver Broadcasting, Inc.	Country
KILV	107.5 FM	Castana	Educational Media Foundation	Contemporary Christian (K-Love)
KIMI	107.7 FM	Malvern	Educational Media Foundation	Worship music (Air1)
KIOA	93.3 FM	Des Moines	Saga Communications of Iowa, LLC	Classic hits
KIOW	107.3 FM	Forest City	Pilot Knob Broadcasting	Variety
KIWA	1550 AM	Sheldon	Community First Broadcasting, LLC	News/Talk
KIWA-FM	105.3 FM	Sheldon	Community First Broadcasting, LLC	Classic rock
KIWR	89.7 FM	Council Bluffs	Iowa Western Community College	Alternative
KIYX	106.1 FM	Sageville	Queenb Radio Wisconsin, Inc.	Classic hits
KJAN	1220 AM	Atlantic	Wireless Communications Corp.	Adult contemporary
KJAS-LP	102.1 FM	Ames	Ames Chinese Ministry Association	Christian Chinese
KJCY	95.5 FM	St. Ansgar	Minn-Iowa Christian Broadcasting, Inc.	Christian
KJIA	88.9 FM	Spirit Lake	Minn-Iowa Christian Broadcasting Inc.	Christian
KJJY	92.5 FM	West Des Moines	Radio License Holding CBC, LLC	Country
KJLM	88.7 FM	Marshalltown	Minn-Iowa Christian Broadcasting, Inc.	Spanish Christian
KJMC	89.3 FM	Des Moines	Minority Communications, Inc.	Urban contemporary
KJOC	93.5 FM	Bettendorf	Townsquare License, LLC	Active rock
KJOM	91.9 FM	State Center	Minn-Iowa Christian Broadcasting, Inc.	Religious
KJTT	88.3 FM	Story City	Minn-Iowa Christian Broadcasting, Inc.	Christian
KJWC	90.5 FM	Hampton	Minn-Iowa Christian Broadcasting	Christian
KJYL	100.7 FM	Eagle Grove	Minn-Iowa Christian Broadcasting, Inc.	Christian
KKDM	107.5 FM	Des Moines	iHM Licenses, LLC	Top 40 (CHR)
KKEZ	94.5 FM	Fort Dodge	Digity 3E License, LLC	Hot adult contemporary
KKHQ-FM	98.5 FM	Cedar Falls	Townsquare License, LLC	Top 40 (CHR)
KKIA	92.9 FM	Ida Grove	Community First Broadcasting, LLC	Country
KKLG	88.3 FM	Newton	Educational Media Foundation	Contemporary Christian (K-Love)
KKMA	99.5 FM	Le Mars	Powell Broadcasting Company, Inc.	Classic rock
KKMI	93.5 FM	Burlington	Pritchard Broadcasting Corporation	Adult contemporary
KKRF	107.9 FM	Stuart	Coon Valley Communications, Inc.	Country
KKRL	93.7 FM	Carroll	Carroll Broadcasting Company	Hot adult contemporary
KKRQ	100.7 FM	Iowa City	iHM Licenses, LLC	Classic rock
KKSI	101.5 FM	Eddyville	O-Town Communications, Inc.	Classic rock
KKSO	88.9 FM	Mitchellville	Iowa Public Radio, Inc.	Iowa Public Radio
KKSY-FM	96.5 FM	Cedar Rapids	iHM Licenses, LLC	Country
KKYY	101.3 FM	Whiting	Powell Broadcasting Company, Inc.	Country
KLCD	89.5 FM	Decorah	Minnesota Public Radio	Public radio
KLDX	88.5 FM	Sioux Center	Educational Media Foundation	Contemporary Christian (K-Love)
KLEE	1480 AM	Ottumwa	O-Town Communications, Inc.	Oldies
KLEM	1410 AM	Le Mars	Powell Broadcasting Company, Inc.	Classic hits
KLFG	89.5 FM	Fort Dodge	Educational Media Foundation	Contemporary Christian (K-Love)
KLGA-FM	92.7 FM	Algona	A2Z Broadcasting, LLC	Adult contemporary
KLGZ	1600 AM	Algona	A2Z Broadcasting, LLC	Country
KLKK	103.7 FM	Clear Lake	Coloff Media, LLC	Classic rock
KLMJ	104.9 FM	Hampton	On The Go Media, Inc.	Gold-based adult contemporary
KLNG	1560 AM	Council Bluffs	Wilkins Communications Network, Inc.	Christian
KLNI	88.7 FM	Decorah	Minnesota Public Radio	Public radio
KLOX	90.9 FM	Creston	St. Gabriel Communications	Christian
KLSS-FM	106.1 FM	Mason City	Digity 3E License, LLC	Adult top 40
KLYV	105.3 FM	Dubuque	Townsquare License, LLC	Top 40 (CHR)
KMA	960 AM	Shenandoah	KMAland Broadcasting, LLC	News/Talk
KMA-FM	99.1 FM	Clarinda	KMAland Broadcasting, LLC	News/Talk
KMAC-LP	92.5 FM	Muscatine	Muscatine Seventh-day Adventist Church	Religious Teaching
KMAQ	1320 AM	Maquoketa	Maquoketa Broadcasting Company	Country
KMAQ-FM	95.1 FM	Maquoketa	Maquoketa Broadcasting Company	Adult contemporary
KMCH	94.7 FM	Manchester	Coloff Media LLC	Variety
KMCN	94.7 FM	Clinton	Gendreau Broadcast LLC	Adult hits
KMCS	93.1 FM	Muscatine	Jam Media Solutions, LLC	Mainstream rock
KMDY	90.9 FM	Keokuk	Sound in Spirit Broadcasting, Inc.	Christian
KMFH-LP	95.7 FM	Oskaloosa	My Father's House, Inc.	Catholic
KMGO	98.7 FM	Centerville	Honey Creek Broadcasting, LLC	Country
KMHV	89.5 FM	Kalona	Mary's Holy Voice	Religious
KMJM	1360 AM	Cedar Rapids	iHM Licenses, LLC	Oldies
KMMK	88.7 FM	Coggon	Plus Charities	Catholic
KMNS	620 AM	Sioux City	iHM Licenses, LLC	News/Talk
KMRR	104.9 FM	Spencer	Saga Communications of Iowa, LLC	Adult contemporary
KMRY	1450 AM	Cedar Rapids	Ecker Broadcasting Co.	Classic hits
KMSC	92.9 FM	Sioux City	Morningside College	College radio
KMXG	96.1 FM	Clinton	iHM Licenses, LLC	Adult contemporary
KMZN	740 AM	Oskaloosa	Jomast Corporation	Classic hits
KNEI-FM	103.5 FM	Waukon	Wennes Communications Stations, Inc.	Country
KNIA	1320 AM	Knoxville	M and H Broadcasting, Inc.	Country
KNOD	105.3 FM	Harlan	Wireless Broadcasting, L.L.C.	Classic hits
KNSB	91.1 FM	Bettendorf	Iowa Public Radio, Inc.	Iowa Public Radio
KNSC	90.7 FM	Carroll	Iowa Public Radio, Inc.	Iowa Public Radio
KNSK	91.1 FM	Fort Dodge	Iowa Public Radio, Inc.	Iowa Public Radio
KNSL	97.9 FM	Lamoni	Iowa Public Radio, Inc.	Iowa Public Radio
KNSM	91.5 FM	Mason City	Iowa Public Radio, Inc.	Iowa Public Radio
KNSY	89.7 FM	Dubuque	Iowa Public Radio, Inc.	Iowa Public Radio
KNSZ	89.1 FM	Ottumwa	Iowa Public Radio, Inc.	Iowa Public Radio
KNWI	107.1 FM	Osceola	Northwestern College	Contemporary Christian
KNWM	96.1 FM	Madrid	Northwestern College	Contemporary Christian
KNWS	1090 AM	Waterloo	Northwestern College	Christian talk
KNWS-FM	101.9 FM	Waterloo	Northwestern College	Contemporary Christian
KOAK	1080 AM	Red Oak	Hawkeye Communications, Inc.	Country
KOEL	950 AM	Oelwein	Townsquare License, LLC	Country/Farm
KOEL-FM	92.3 FM	Oelwein	Townsquare License, LLC	Country
KOEZ	104.1 FM	Ames	Saga Communications of Iowa, LLC	Soft adult contemporary
KOIA	88.1 FM	Storm Lake	Saint Gabriel Communications, Ltd	Catholic
KOJI	90.7 FM	Okoboji	Western Iowa Tech Community College	Public radio
KOKX	1310 AM	Keokuk	Keokuk Broadcasting Inc.	Classic hits/Talk
KOKZ	105.7 FM	Waterloo	NRG License Sub, LLC	Classic hits
KOSY-FM	95.7 FM	Anamosa	iHM Licenses, LLC	Sports
KOTM-FM	97.7 FM	Ottumwa	O-Town Communications, Inc.	Top 40 (CHR)
KOUR-LP	92.7 FM	Coralville	Our Lady of Perpetual Help, Inc.	Catholic
KPOG-LP	102.9 FM	Grimes	Des Moines Metro Adventist Radio Company	Religious Teaching
KPSZ	940 AM	Des Moines	Saga Communications of Iowa, LLC	Christian music/talk
KPTY	1330 AM	Waterloo	NRG License Sub, LLC	Classic country
KPUL	101.7 FM	Winterset	Positive Impact Media, Inc.	Contemporary Christian
KPVL	89.1 FM	Postville	Community Public Media	Public radio
KQCR-FM	98.9 FM	Parkersburg	On The Go Media, Inc.	Yacht rock
KQKL	95.3 FM	Keokuk	Educational Media Foundation	Contemporary Christian (K-Love)
KQKQ-FM	98.5 FM	Council Bluffs	NRG License Sub, LLC	Hot adult contemporary
KQLF	88.3 FM	Ottumwa	Sound in Spirit Broadcasting, Inc.	Christian
KQMG	1220 AM	Independence	KM Radio of Independence, L.L.C.	Silent
KQMG-FM	95.3 FM	Independence	KM Radio of Independence, L.L.C.	Classic hits
KQNU	102.3 FM	Onawa	Powell Broadcasting Company, Inc.	Hot adult contemporary
KQOP-LP	94.7 FM	Charles City	Charles City Educational Association	Catholic
KQWC-FM	95.7 FM	Webster City	Fieldview Broadcasting LLC	Adult contemporary
KRIB	1490 AM	Mason City	Digity 3E License, LLC	Adult standards
KRJE	89.9 FM	Hawkeye	Hawkeye Seventh-Day Adventist Church	Christian
KRKN	104.3 FM	Eldon	O-Town Communications, Inc.	Country
KRLS	92.1 FM	Knoxville	M and H Broadcasting, Inc.	Adult contemporary
KRNA	94.1 FM	Iowa City	Townsquare License, LLC	Classic rock
KRNI	1010 AM	Mason City	Iowa Public Radio, Inc.	Iowa Public Radio
KRNQ	96.3 FM	Keokuk	Community Broadcasting, Inc.	Religious
KRNT	1350 AM	Des Moines	Saga Communications of Iowa, LLC	Sports (ESPN)
KROS	1340 AM	Clinton	KROS Broadcasting, Inc.	Oldies/News
KRQC-LP	107.9 FM	Davenport	Davenport Adventist Radio, Inc.	Christian
KRQN	107.1 FM	Vinton	George S. Flinn, Jr.	Classic hits
KRTI	106.7 FM	Grinnell	Alpha Media Licensee LLC	Silent
KRUI-FM	89.7 FM	Iowa City	Student Broadcasters Inc.	College radio
KSCJ	1360 AM	Sioux City	KSUX/KSCJ Radio Broadcasting Co	News/Talk
KSEZ	97.9 FM	Sioux City	iHM Licenses, LLC	Active rock
KSHW	88.3 FM	Glidden	Grace Baptist Church	Religious
KSIB	1520 AM	Creston	G. O. Radio, Ltd.	Classic hits
KSIB-FM	101.3 FM	Creston	G. O. Radio, Limited	Country
KSKB	99.1 FM	Brooklyn	Florida Public Radio, Inc.	Religious
KSMA-FM	98.7 FM	Osage	Coloff Media, LLC	Country
KSOI	91.9 FM	Murray	Grand River Valley Radio Inc.	Community radio
KSOM	96.5 FM	Audubon	Meredith Communications L.C.	Country
KSOU	1090 AM	Sioux Center	Community First Broadcasting, LLC	Spanish adult hits
KSOU-FM	93.9 FM	Sioux Center	Community First Broadcasting, LLC	Adult contemporary
KSTM	88.9 FM	Indianola	Simpson College	College radio
KSTZ	102.5 FM	Des Moines	Saga Communications of Iowa, LLC	Hot adult contemporary
KSUI	91.7 FM	Iowa City	Iowa Public Radio, Inc.	Iowa Public Radio & Classical
KSWI	95.7 FM	Atlantic	Meredith Communications, L.C.	Classic hits
KTDC-LP	105.3 FM	Muscatine	Muscatine Educational Association	Catholic
KTDV	91.9 FM	State Center	Marshalltown Education Plus, Inc.	Contemporary Christian
KTFC	103.3 FM	Sioux City	Community Broadcasting, Inc.	Religious talk (Bott Radio Network)
KTFG	102.9 FM	Sioux Rapids	Community Broadcasting, Inc.	Religious talk (Bott Radio Network)
KTJT-LP	103.1 FM	Davenport	Davenport Educational Association	Catholic
KTLB	105.9 FM	Twin Lakes	Digity 3E License, LLC	Oldies
KTWA	92.7 FM	Ottumwa	O-Town Communications, Inc.	Adult contemporary
KUDV	106.9 FM	Bloomfield	Tri-Rivers Broadcasting Company	Country
KUNI	90.9 FM	Cedar Falls	Iowa Public Radio, Inc.	Public radio
KUOO	103.9 FM	Spirit Lake	Community First Broadcasting, LLC	Adult contemporary
KUQQ	102.1 FM	Milford	Community First Broadcasting, LLC	Classic rock
KURE	88.5 FM	Ames	Residence Associations Broadcasting Services, Inc.	College radio
KUYY	100.1 FM	Emmetsburg	Community First Broadcasting, LLC	Adult top 40
KVCI	89.7 FM	Montezuma	VCY America, Inc.	Conservative religious
KVDI	99.3 FM	Huxley	VCY America, Inc.	Conservative religious
KVFD	1400 AM	Fort Dodge	Digity 3E License, LLC	Talk
KVIK	104.7 FM	Decorah	Wennes Communications Stations, Inc.	Classic hits
KVPG	103.9 FM	Dunkerton	VCY America, Inc.	Religious
KVPJ	94.7 FM	Rockford	VCY America, Inc.	Religious
KWAR	89.9 FM	Waverly	Wartburg College	Variety
KWAY	1470 AM	Waverly	Ael Suhr Enterprises, Inc.	Country
KWAY-FM	99.3 FM	Waverly	Ael Suhr Enterprises, Inc.	Top 40 (CHR)
KWBG	1590 AM	Boone	Fieldview Broadcasting LLC	News/Talk
KWDM	88.7 FM	West Des Moines	West Des Moines Community School District	Alternative
KWIA	100.9 FM	Newell	Panther Communications LLC	Classic hits/Adult album alternative
KWIT	90.3 FM	Sioux City	Western Iowa Tech Community College	Public radio
KWLC	1240 AM	Decorah	Luther College	College radio
KWMT	540 AM	Fort Dodge	Digity 3E License, LLC	Country/Farm
KWPC	860 AM	Muscatine	Jam Media Solutions, LLC	Farm/Classic country
KWPU	88.5 FM	Oskaloosa	William Penn College	College radio
KWQW	98.3 FM	Boone	Radio License Holding CBC, LLC	Top 40 (CHR)
KWSL	1470 AM	Sioux City	iHM Licenses, LLC	Spanish adult hits
KWVI	88.9 FM	Waverly	American Family Association	Inspirational (AFR)
KXEL	1540 AM	Waterloo	NRG License Sub, LLC	News/Talk
KXFT	99.7 FM	Manson	Alpha 3E Licensee LLC	Adult contemporary
KXGE	102.3 FM	Dubuque	Townsquare License, LLC	Classic rock
KXGM	89.1 FM	Hiawatha	Educational Media Foundation	Worship music (Air1)
KXIA	101.1 FM	Marshalltown	Trending Media, Inc.	Country
KXIC	800 AM	Iowa City	iHM Licenses, LLC	Sports (FSR)
KXIM	98.3 FM	Sanborn	AM-770 Radio Engineering	Variety
KXJX-LP	92.5 FM	Clinton	Clinton Educational Association	Catholic
KXKT	103.7 FM	Glenwood	iHM Licenses, LLC	Country
KXLQ	1490 AM	Indianola	Birach Broadcasting Corporation	Regional Mexican
KXNO	1460 AM	Des Moines	iHM Licenses, LLC	Sports (FSR)
KXNO-FM	106.3 FM	Ankeny	iHM Licenses, LLC	Sports (FSR)
KYFR	920 AM	Shenandoah	Family Stations, Inc.	Religious
KYMJ-LP	103.1 FM	Carroll	St Barnabas Educational Association	Catholic
KYTC	102.7 FM	Northwood	Digity 3E License, LLC	Classic hits
KZAT-FM	95.5 FM	Belle Plaine	Grupo Roble, LLC	Regional Mexican
KZIA	102.9 FM	Cedar Rapids	KZIA, Inc.	Top 40 (CHR)
KZLB	92.1 FM	Fort Dodge	Alpha 3E Licensee LLC	Active rock
KZOW	91.9 FM	Forest City	Waldorf College	College radio
KZTP	104.3 FM	Sibley	Absolute Communications LLC	Full service Spanish
KZWC	1570 AM	Webster City	Fieldview Broadcasting LLC	Oldies/Soft adult contemporary
WDBQ	1490 AM	Dubuque	Townsquare License, LLC	Talk
WHO	1040 AM	Des Moines	iHM Licenses, LLC	News/Talk
WJOD	103.3 FM	Asbury	Townsquare License, LLC	Country
WLLR-FM	103.7 FM	Davenport	iHM Licenses, LLC	Country
WMT	600 AM	Cedar Rapids	iHM Licenses, LLC	News/Talk
WOC	1420 AM	Davenport	iHM Licenses, LLC	News/Talk
WOI	640 AM	Ames	Iowa Public Radio, Inc.	Iowa Public Radio
WOI-FM	90.1 FM	Ames	Iowa Public Radio, Inc.	Iowa Public Radio
WSUI	910 AM	Iowa City	Iowa Public Radio, Inc.	Iowa Public Radio

== Defunct ==
- KBGG
- KBOB
- KCBC-FM
- KDIC
- KDPS
- KDRA-LP
- KEMB-LP
- KEWS
- KFIM-LP
- KKFD-FM
- KMCD
- KQBV
- KRNL-FM
- KUCB
- KXGM
- KULT-LP
- WGF
