= Mass media in Des Moines, Iowa =

As of 2021, the Des Moines metropolitan area is the 67th-largest media market in the United States, as ranked by Nielsen Media Research, with 467,990 television households (0.4% of all U.S. homes). The following is a summary of broadcast and print media in Des Moines, Iowa:

== Newspapers and magazines ==
=== Daily ===
The Des Moines Register serves as the metropolitan area's lone daily newspaper. Owned by the Gannett Company, the Register had a daily circulation of 86,982 and a Sunday circulation of 152,239, as of 2014.

=== University ===
- The Grand Views – Grand View University
- The Times Delphic– Drake University
- The Simpsonian– Simpson College

=== Weekly and community ===
Weekly newspapers in the Des Moines metropolitan area
Name	Area of coverage	Focus
Altoona Herald-Mitchellville Index	eastern suburbs	
Bayard News Gazette	Bayard	
Carlisle Citizen	Carlisle	
Cityview		alternative weekly
Dallas County News	Adel and Dallas County	
Des Moines Business Record		business news
Earlham Advocate	Earlham	
Guthrie Center Times	Guthrie Center	
Guthrie County Vedette	Panora and Guthrie County	
Indianola Record-Herald & Tribune	Indianola	
Iowa Bystander		African-American community
Northeast Dallas County Record	Woodward and Dallas County	
Perry Chief	Perry	
Stuart Herald	Stuart	
Winterset Madisonian	Winterset and Madison County	

== Television ==
Channel	Callsign	Network	Subchannels		Owner	Website
(Virtual/RF)	Callsign	Network	Channel	Programming	Owner	Website
5.1	WOI-DT	ABC	5.2; 5.3; 5.4	True Crime Network; Grit; Cozi TV	Tegna Inc.	
8.1	KCCI	CBS	8.2; 8.3; 8.4; 8.5	Me-TV; MyNetworkTV/H&I; Story Television; Nosey	Hearst Television	
11.1	KDIN	PBS	11.2; 11.3; 11.4	PBS Kids; World; Create	Iowa Public Television	
13.1	WHO-DT	NBC	13.2; 13.3; 13.4	Rewind TV; Antenna TV; Court TV	Nexstar Media Group	
17.1	KDSM-TV	FOX	17.2; 17.3; 17.4	Comet TV; Charge! TBD	Sinclair Broadcast Group	
19.1	KDMI	TCT	19.2; 19.3	SonLife; TheGrio	Tri-State Christian Television	
23.1	KCWI-TV	CW	23.2; 23.3; 23.4	HSN; Bounce TV; Quest	Tegna Inc.	
39.1	KFPX-TV	Ion	39.2; 39.3; 39.4; 39.5; 39.6	Court TV; Laff; Ion Mystery; Defy TV; TrueReal	E. W. Scripps Company	

== Radio ==
- K260AM
- KASI
- KAZR
- KBGG
- KCYZ
- KDFR
- KDLF
- KDLS
- KDLS-FM
- KDPS
- KDRB
- KFMG-LP
- KGGO
- KHKI
- KICG
- KICJ
- KICL
- KICP
- KIOA
- KJJY
- KJMC
- KKDM
- KNSL
- KNWI
- KNWM
- KOEZ
- KPSZ
- KPUL
- KRNT
- KSTZ
- KURE
- KVDI
- KWBG
- KWDM
- KWKY
- KWQW
- KXIA
- KXLQ
- KXNO
- KXNO-FM
- WHO
- WOI
- WOI-FM
- WXL57
