= KILJ =

KILJ may refer to:

- KILJ (AM), a radio station (1130 AM) licensed to Mount Pleasant, Iowa, United States
- KILJ-FM, a radio station (105.5 FM) licensed to Mount Pleasant, Iowa, United States
