= KWIT =

Public radio station in Sioux City, Iowa

KWIT and KOJI

KWIT: Sioux City, Iowa; KOJI: Okoboji, Iowa; United States
- Frequencies: KWIT: 90.3 MHz; KOJI: 90.7 MHz
- Branding: Siouxland Public Media

Programming
- Format: Classical music/news/talk
- Affiliations: National Public Radio

Ownership
- Owner: Western Iowa Tech Community College

History
- First air date: KWIT: January 31, 1978; KOJI: August 2002
- Call sign meaning: KWIT: Western Iowa Tech; KOJI: Okoboji

Technical information
- Licensing authority: FCC
- Facility ID: KWIT: 71839; KOJI: 123310
- Class: KWIT: C1; KOJI: A
- ERP: KWIT: 100,000 watts; KOJI: 4500 watts
- HAAT: KWIT: 277 meters (909 ft); KOJI: 113 meters (371 ft)
- Transmitter coordinates: KWIT: 42°28′56″N 96°15′30″W; KOJI: 43°09′53″N 95°19′29″W

Links
- Public license information: KWIT: Public file; LMS; KOJI: Public file; LMS
- Website: www.kwit.org

KWIT (90.3 FM) is the National Public Radio member station for Sioux City, Iowa and northwestern Iowa. It airs a mix of NPR programming and classical music. Owned by Western Iowa Tech Community College, it operates a full-time satellite, KOJI (90.7 FM) in Okoboji, Iowa. It is the largest NPR station in Iowa that is not a part of Iowa Public Radio.

KWIT signed on for the first time on January 31, 1978. Prior to then, most of the area got grade B coverage from WOI in Ames, and from KUSD in Vermillion, South Dakota. KWIT is the first radio station to broadcast on HD radio in Sioux City.

After several years of branding as "KWIT-KOJI", in 2017 it adopted the on-air name "Siouxland Public Media".

== Syndicated Shows ==
=== Iowa Basement Tapes ===
Iowa Basement Tapes is an American weekly hour-long radio program created by host Kristian Day and produced in collaboration with KFMG-LP (98.9 FM). The show focuses on Iowa's history in punk rock, garage, metal, and electronic. It is syndicated on KWIT (90.3FM) and KOJI (90.7FM) broadcasting on Fridays from 11PM to Midnight.
