= KLGA =

KLGA may refer to:

- The ICAO code for LaGuardia Airport in New York City
- KLGA-FM, a radio station (92.7 FM) licensed to serve Algona, Iowa, United States
- KLGZ, a radio station (1600 AM) licensed to serve Algona, Iowa.
