= KDAO =

KDAO may refer to:

- KDAO (AM), a radio station (1190 AM) licensed to Marshalltown, Iowa, United States
- KDAO-FM, a radio station (99.5 FM) licensed to Eldora, Iowa
- KDIT-CD, a low-power television station (channel 17, virtual 45) licensed to Des Moines, Iowa, which held the call signs KDAO-LP or KDAO-CD from 1995 to 2021
