= KIFG =

KIFG may refer to:

- KIFG (AM), a radio station (1510 AM) licensed to Iowa Falls, Iowa, United States
- KIFG-FM, a radio station (95.3 FM) licensed to Iowa Falls, Iowa, United States
