= KSOU =

KSOU may refer to:

- Karnataka State Open University
- KSOU (AM), a radio station (1090 AM) licensed to Sioux Center, Iowa, United States
- KSOU-FM, a radio station (93.9 FM) licensed to Sioux Center, Iowa, United States
