= KCHE =

KCHE may refer to:

- KCHE (AM), a radio station (1440 AM) licensed to Cherokee, Iowa, United States
- KCHE-FM, a radio station (92.1 FM) licensed to Cherokee, Iowa, United States
