= KSIB =

KSIB may refer to:

- KSIB (AM), a radio station (1520 AM) licensed to Creston, Iowa, United States
- KSIB-FM, a radio station (101.3 FM) licensed to Creston, Iowa, United States
