= WOI =

Woi or WOI may refer to:

- WOI (AM), a radio station (640 AM) in Ames, Iowa
- WOI-FM, a radio station (90.1 FM) Ames, Iowa
- WOI-DT, a television station in Ames, Iowa
- War of independence, such as a war of national liberation
- Warrant Officer Class I, a rank in the British Armed Forces
- Woi language, a Malayo-Polynesian language
- Women's Organization of Iran, an Iranian women's rights organization
