= KFMG =

KFMG may refer to:

- KFMG-LP, a low-power radio station (98.9 FM) licensed to Des Moines, Iowa, United States
- KXLL, a radio station (100.7 FM) licensed to Juneau, Alaska, United States, previously KFMG, 1999–2006
- KFMG, a rock station (107.9 FM) in Albuquerque, New Mexico, 1979–1991, now known as KBQI
