= KZWF =

KZWF may refer to:

- KZWF-LP, a low-power radio station (93.5 FM) licensed to serve Wichita Falls, Texas, United States
- KICP, a radio station (105.9 FM) licensed to serve Patterson, Iowa, United States, which held the call sign KZWF from 2007 to 2011
