= KJLN =

KJLN may refer to:

- KJLN-LD, a low-power television station (channel 29, virtual 50) licensed to serve Joplin, Missouri, United States
- KEWS, a radio station (104.7 FM) licensed to serve Sac City, Iowa, United States, which held the call sign KJLN from 2008 to 2012
- Joplin Regional Airport in Jasper County, Missouri.
