= KCSI =

KCSI may refer to:

- Knight Commander of the Order of the Star of India
- KCSI (FM), a radio station (95.3 FM) licensed to Red Oak, Iowa, United States
- Kansas City Southern Industries
