= KMSC =

KMSC may refer to:

- KMSC (AM), a Part-15 unlicensed AM radio station in Moorhead, Minnesota, United States
- KMSC (FM), a radio station (88.3 FM) licensed to Sioux City, Iowa, United States
