= KQCR =

KQCR refers to the following broadcasting stations in the United States:

- KQCR-FM, a radio station on 98.9 MHz licensed to Parkersburg, Iowa
- KZIA, an FM radio station on 102.9 MHz licensed to Cedar Rapids, Iowa, which held the call sign KQCR from 1975 to 1995
