= KCCK-FM =

- Cedar Rapids, Iowa; United States
- Frequency: 88.3 MHz (HD Radio)
- Branding: Jazz 88.3

Programming
- Format: Jazz
- Subchannels: HD2: Jazz; HD3: NOAA Weather Radio
- Affiliations: Public Radio International

Ownership
- Owner: Kirkwood Community College

History
- First air date: September 22, 1972

Technical information
- Facility ID: 34954
- Class: C3
- ERP: 10,000 watts
- HAAT: 128.0 meters
- Transmitter coordinates: 41°54′33″N 91°39′17″W

Links
- Webcast: Listen Live; Listen Live (HD2)
- Website: kcck.org

KCCK-FM (88.3 MHz) is a public radio station licensed to Kirkwood Community College in Cedar Rapids-Iowa City, Iowa. KCCK is Iowa's only jazz radio station.

KCCK-FM broadcasts in HD.

== History ==
KCCK started out as a 1972 project in an electronics class at Kirkwood Community College. The same year a license was granted and the station broadcast, albeit sporadically for the first 3 years. In 1975, KUNI donated its 1945 transmitter to KCCK and KCCK built a larger tower.

== Broadcasting ==
Jazz, Blues, news and informational programming from American Public Media, besides 12 hours of blues and nine hours of new age/ambient, Native American and Celtic music per week.

== See also ==
- List of jazz radio stations in the United States
