= Western Iowa Tech Community College =

Community college in Iowa, U.S.

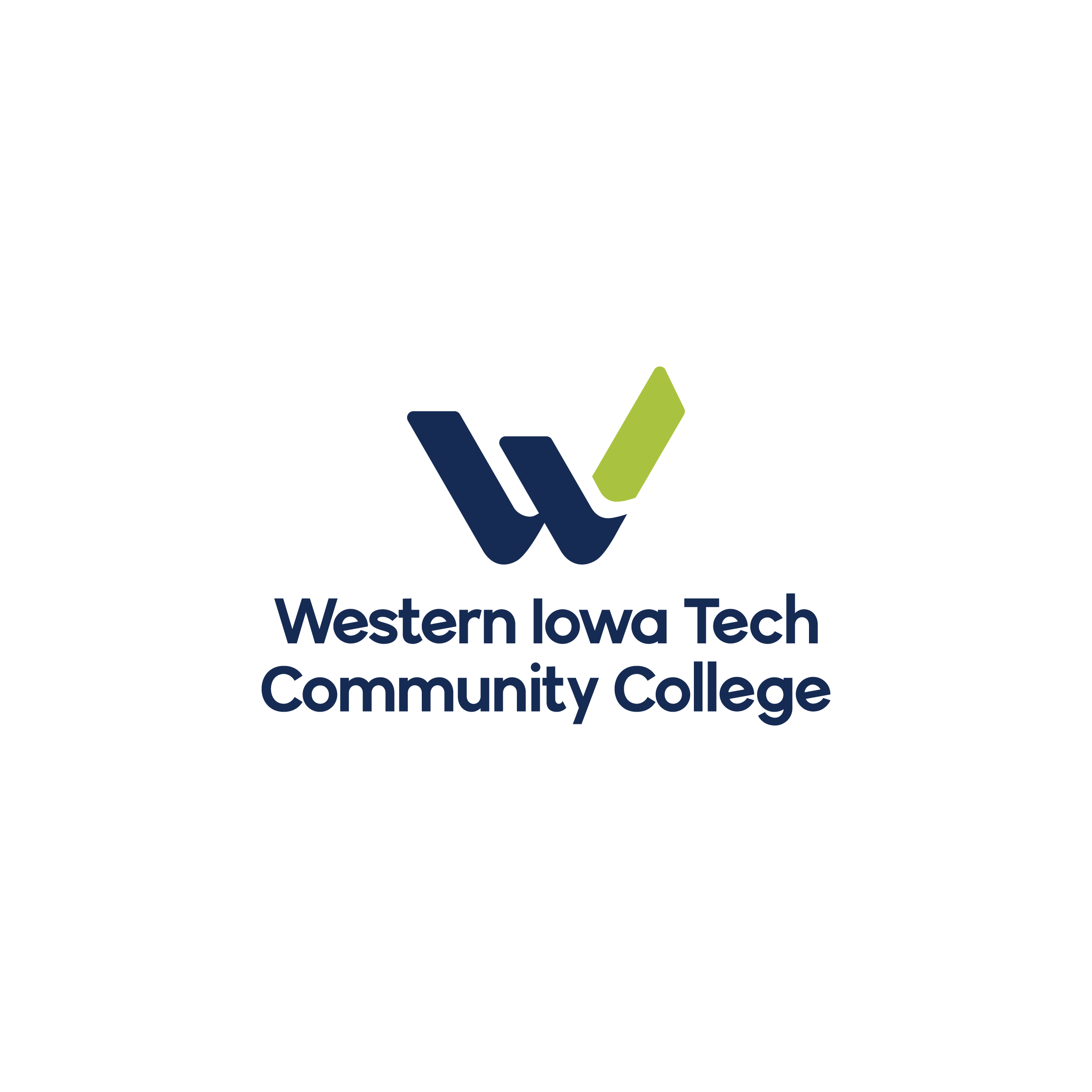
- Former name: Western Iowa Technical Community College
- Type: Public community college
- Established: 1966
- President: Terry Lindsay
- Undergraduates: 3,083 full-time, 3,704 part-time
- Location: Sioux City (Main Campus); 42°29′02″N 96°20′53″W; Cherokee; Denison; Le Mars (Le Mars Center); Mapleton (Mapleton Center), Iowa, United States
- Colors: Navy and Lime
- Website: www.witcc.edu

Western Iowa Tech Community College (Western Iowa Tech, WITCC, or WIT) is a public community college based in Sioux City, Iowa. The college serves a six-county area comprising Cherokee, Crawford, Ida, Monona, Plymouth, and Woodbury counties. In addition to its main campus in Sioux City, it operates campuses or regional centers in Cherokee, Denison, Le Mars, and Mapleton.

Western Iowa Tech offers transfer, career and technical education, adult education, and workforce-training programs. Its awards include Associate of Arts, Associate of Science, and Associate of Applied Science degrees, as well as diplomas and occupational certificates.

== History ==
Western Iowa Tech was organized in August 1966 as an area vocational-technical school under Chapter 280A of the Iowa Code. Its first board of directors was elected in November 1966, and Robert H. Kiser was selected as the institution's first chief administrator. Classes began on January 27, 1967, when the college assumed responsibility for three postsecondary vocational and technical programs previously operated by the Sioux City Community Schools. By the fall of that year, the college operated 17 full-time programs and enrolled 230 students.

The college initially operated from temporary facilities in Sioux City. A permanent campus was established on a 143-acre (58 ha) site on Stone Avenue in 1970. Western Iowa Tech received authorization to offer the Associate of Arts degree in 1973, expanding its original vocational and technical mission to include college-transfer education. Public radio station KWIT began broadcasting from the campus in 1978.

Enrollment and facilities expanded during the following decades. Sun Ridge Court, the college's first on-campus housing complex, opened in 1982. The Denison campus opened in 1993, followed by the Cherokee Campus and Conference Center in 1996. The college began offering online courses in 2002, and its Advanced Sciences Building opened in 2005.

The Robert E. Dunker Student Center opened in 2012, and Prairie Place, the college's third student-housing complex, opened in 2014. A permanent Le Mars center also opened that year. The college introduced intercollegiate athletics and esports in 2023.

== Academics ==
Western Iowa Tech hosts the Western Iowa Regents Resource Center, which supports transfer pathways involving Iowa State University, the University of Iowa, and the University of Northern Iowa. Students may combine online coursework with meetings at the college's Sioux City campus.

By early 2015, the college was operating a Culinary Arts program with dedicated instructional kitchen facilities.

In fall 2026, the college began offering a 77-credit Associate of Applied Science program in Aviation Maintenance Technology. In September 2026, the Federal Aviation Administration issued the college an Air Agency Certificate designating it as an FAA Part 147 Aviation Maintenance Technician School. Training is conducted at the college's hangar at Sioux Gateway Airport.

== Athletics ==
Western Iowa Tech's athletic teams are known as the Comets. The college is a member of the National Junior College Athletic Association and the Iowa Community College Athletic Conference. Its intercollegiate programs include men's basketball, men's and women's soccer, women's volleyball, and competitive cheer. The college also sponsors esports.

The NJCAA and ICCAC approved the college's entry into intercollegiate competition in 2022, and its first teams began competing in 2023.

== Student media and public broadcasting ==
The Sioux City campus is home to KWIT and KOJI, a noncommercial public-radio service known as Siouxland Public Media. KWIT began broadcasting in 1978, and KOJI was added in 2002 to extend public-radio service into the Iowa Great Lakes region.

In 2025, Western Iowa Tech Community College established KWSR-LP 94.3 FM, a student-operated low-power FM radio station serving the Sioux City area. Developed by the college’s Mass Communication program and supported by a grant from the Gilchrist Foundation, the station expanded the existing online platform, Comet Radio, into an over-the-air broadcast outlet. KWSR-LP provides students with hands-on experience in broadcasting, audio production, and media operations, while delivering music, news, and student-produced content to a local audience within a 30-mile radius. The station continues to function as both an educational resource and a community media platform.

== J-1 visa litigation ==
In November 2020, eight students from Chile sued WITCC, claiming that the school misrepresented a program in which students under J-1 visas were supposed to earn a scholarship in exchange for working in an internship in their field of study. The students alleged that they were instead placed in factory jobs irrelevant to their field, a situation they compared unfavorably to human trafficking. The college has disputed some allegations and promised to make changes to the program, but a second group of international students, including nine students from Brazil and two from Chile, filed a similar suit in January 2021. WITCC settled a lawsuit filed by students over its former J1 Visa program. The college stated that the settlement was a financial decision and not an admission of wrongdoing. The J1 Visa program is no longer operational at WITCC.

== Campus ==
The main campus is located near the corner of Stone Avenue and Gordon Drive in Sioux City. WITCC also has two main branch campuses in Denison, Iowa and Cherokee, Iowa, where there is also an on-campus conference center. Mapleton, Iowa and LeMars, Iowa also have "learning centers" that offer only a small number of classes. WITCC also offers online distance learning programs.

The college has undergone extensive renovations in recent years. The student learning environments in the Kiser Building and community meeting area in the Corporate College have been re-done. In 2014, another housing complex, Prairie Place, was added to the Sioux City Campus and a permanent WITCC Le Mars Center was opened.

A new student life and wellness center was opened in January 2012, named the Dunker Center after President Emeritus Robert E. Dunker. The two-story, 44,000 sq. foot facility contains a basketball court, two cross-court basketball courts, a volleyball court, and a three-lane walking/jogging track. Along the edges is a cardio fitness area with elliptical machines and treadmills, as well as a strength training room with free weights and Nautilus-style equipment. The college offers a selection of fitness classes in these facilities, made possible largely due to a challenge grant from The Kresge Foundation as well as community support.

Western Iowa Tech opened the Rick and Marla Franck Career Academy at the Denison Campus in September 2025. The academy provides hands-on career training for high school students in the region, offering college credit and certifications. It is named in honor of longtime board member Rick Franck and his wife Marla.

=== Student housing ===
WITCC has three residence halls, Sun Ridge Court, Bur Oak Suites, and Prairie Place. The three areas can house a combined total of around 540 students. Sun Ridge Court provides apartment-style housing, with one- and two-bedroom apartment units, and also family-style housing. Bur Oak Suites offers more traditional housing options, with four-bedroom/two-bath suites. Bur Oak Suites was erected in 2008 and includes common areas, a computer lab, a music room, a study room, and a community kitchen. The Prairie Place residence hall, which opened in the fall of 2014, is similar to Bur Oak Suites in size and layout.
