= KOAK =

- Red Oak, Iowa; United States
- Frequency: 1080 (kHz)
- Branding: Country Sunshine Radio

Programming
- Format: Country
- Affiliations: ABC Radio/Citadel Media

Ownership
- Owner: Hawkeye Communications, Inc
- Sister stations: KCSI

History
- Call sign meaning: Red Oak

Technical information
- Licensing authority: FCC
- Class: D
- Power: 250 watts (daytime)
- Transmitter coordinates: 41°01′00″N 95°12′46″W

Links
- Public license information: Public file; LMS
- Website: www.kcsifm.com

KOAK (1080 AM) is a commercial radio station serving the Red Oak, Iowa area. The station primarily broadcasts a country music format. KOAK is licensed to Hawkeye Communications, Inc as a daytime-only station. During broadcast hours, KOAK simulcasts the FM sister station (KCSI) content.
