= KHKE =

- Cedar Falls, Iowa; United States
- Broadcast area: Waterloo, Iowa
- Frequency: 89.5 MHz

Programming
- Format: Classical music
- Affiliations: American Public Media; NPR; Public Radio International

Ownership
- Owner: Iowa Public Radio, Inc.

History
- First air date: April 1, 1974
- Call sign meaning: Honors University of Northern Iowa radio pioneer Herbert Hake

Technical information
- Licensing authority: FCC
- Facility ID: 69027
- Class: C3
- ERP: 10,000 watts
- HAAT: 127 meters (417 ft)
- Transmitter coordinates: 42°23′55″N 92°19′34″W
- Translator: 90.7 K214BA (Mason City, etc.)

Links
- Public license information: Public file; LMS
- Webcast: Listen Live
- Website: Iowa Public Radio

KHKE (89.5 FM) is a radio station owned and operated by Iowa Public Radio in Cedar Falls, Iowa, United States. It is a classical station, sharing broadcast facilities with KUNI.

Former logo

== Ice storm and tower collapse ==
On February 24, 2007, the upper half of the KHKE tower collapsed due to an ice storm. The remaining lower half was later demolished, and the tower was scheduled to be rebuilt in summer 2007.
