= KLMJ =

- Hampton, Iowa; United States
- Broadcast area: Mason City area
- Frequency: 104.9 MHz

Programming
- Format: Gold-based adult contemporary

Ownership
- Owner: Shawn Dietz; (On The Go Media, Inc.)
- Sister stations: KQCR-FM

History
- Former call signs: KWGG (1982–1993)

Technical information
- Licensing authority: FCC
- Facility ID: 25914
- Class: A
- ERP: 6,000 watts
- HAAT: 93.0 meters (305.1 ft)
- Transmitter coordinates: 42°49′52″N 93°11′20″W

Links
- Public license information: Public file; LMS
- Webcast: Listen live
- Website: radioonthego.com

KLMJ (104.9 FM) is a radio station broadcasting a gold-based adult contemporary format. Licensed to Hampton, Iowa, United States, the station serves the Mason City area. The station is currently licensed to OnTheGoMedia, Inc.

== History ==
The station went on the air as KWGG on September 8, 1982, and started commercial radio broadcasting on May 16, 1983. In October 1993, the station changed its call sign to the current KLMJ.

Previous logo

KLMJ and its sister station KQCR were purchased by OnTheGoMedia Inc. in November of 2022.
