= Patterson, Iowa =

- City
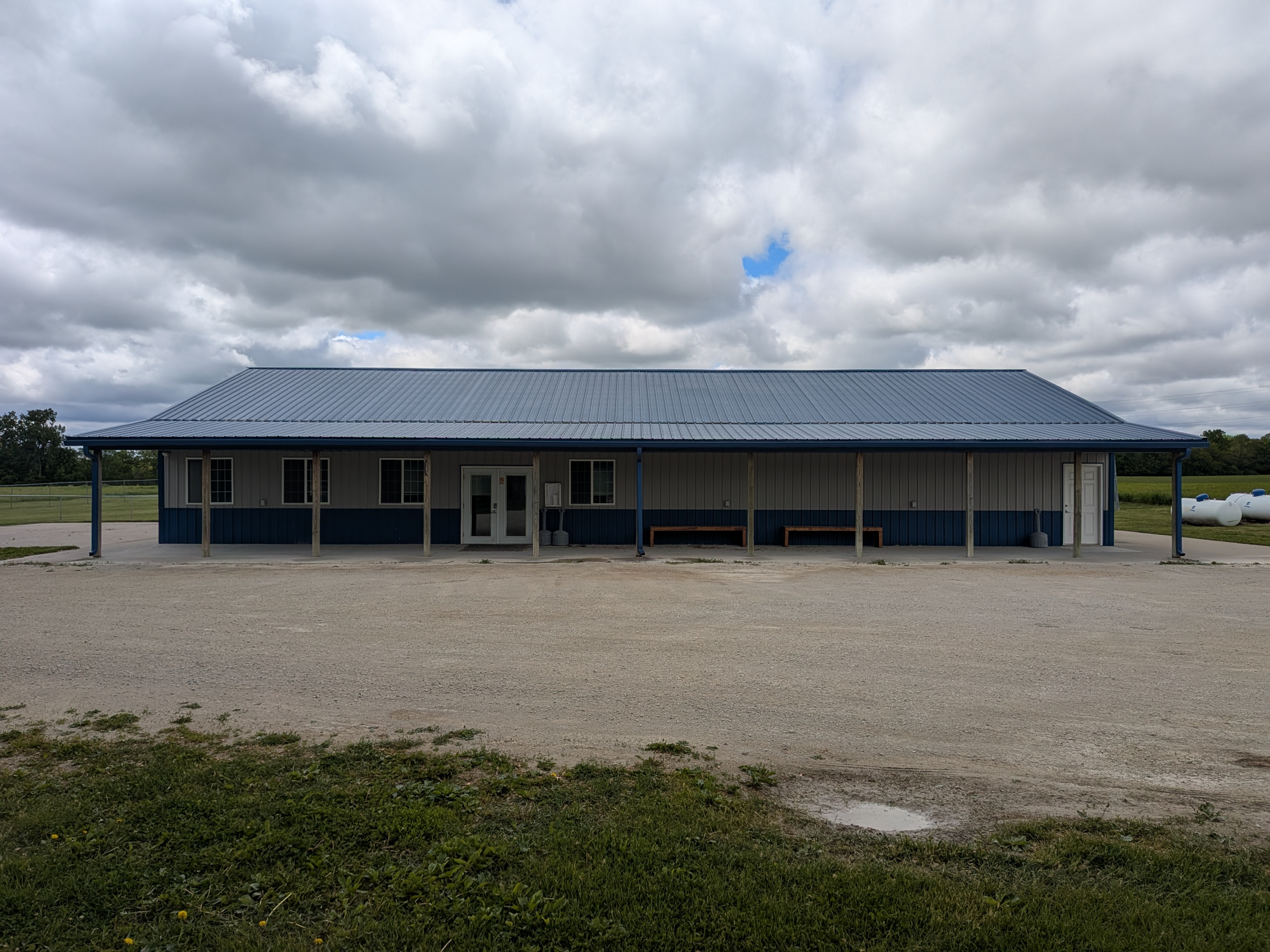
- Community Center

- Location of Patterson, Iowa
- Coordinates: 41°20′55″N 93°52′34″W
- Country: USA
- State: Iowa
- County: Madison

Area
  - Total: 0.45 sq mi (1.17 km^{2})
  - Land: 0.45 sq mi (1.17 km^{2})
  - Water: 0 sq mi (0.00 km^{2})
- Elevation: 876 ft (267 m)

Population (2020)
  - Total: 176
  - Density: 390.1/sq mi (150.62/km^{2})
- Time zone: UTC-6 (Central (CST))
  - Summer (DST): UTC-5 (CDT)
- ZIP code: 50218
- Area code: 515
- FIPS code: 19-61860
- GNIS feature ID: 2396161

Patterson is a city in Madison County, Iowa, United States. The population was 176 at the time of the 2020 census. It is part of the Des Moines–West Des Moines Metropolitan Statistical Area.

== History ==
Patterson was laid out in 1872. It derives its name from Alexander Pattison, the original owner of the town site, but the name was misspelled on the plat and stuck.

== Geography ==
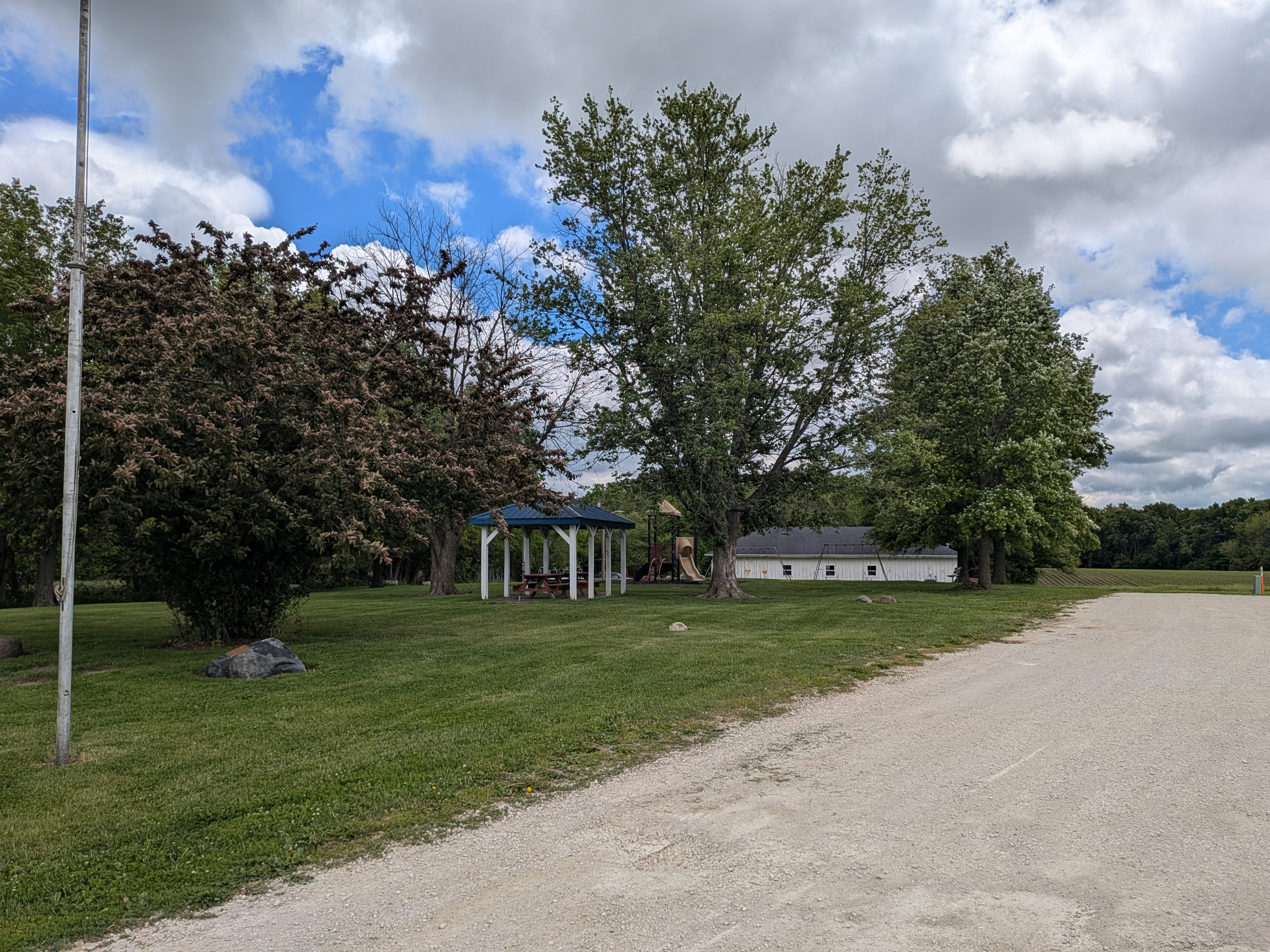
Elton Tommy Faux Memorial Park in Patterson

Patterson is located along the Middle River.

According to the United States Census Bureau, the city has a total area of 0.20 square miles (0.52 km^{2}), all of it land.

== Demographics ==
Historical populations
Year	Pop.	±%
1880	186	—
1890	133	−28.5%
1900	163	+22.6%
1910	147	−9.8%
1920	136	−7.5%
1930	123	−9.6%
1940	166	+35.0%
1950	133	−19.9%
1960	157	+18.0%
1970	120	−23.6%
1980	138	+15.0%
1990	128	−7.2%
2000	126	−1.6%
2010	130	+3.2%
2020	176	+35.4%
Source:"U.S. Census website". United States Census Bureau. and Iowa Data Center; Source: U.S. Decennial Census

=== 2020 census ===
As of the census of 2020, there were 176 people, 72 households, and 40 families residing in the city. The population density was 390.1 inhabitants per square mile (150.6/km^{2}). There were 82 housing units at an average density of 181.8 per square mile (70.2/km^{2}). The racial makeup of the city was 96.0% White, 0.0% Black or African American, 0.0% Native American, 1.1% Asian, 0.0% Pacific Islander, 0.0% from other races and 2.8% from two or more races. Hispanic or Latino persons of any race comprised 1.1% of the population.

Of the 72 households, 33.3% of which had children under the age of 18 living with them, 37.5% were married couples living together, 15.3% were cohabitating couples, 19.4% had a female householder with no spouse or partner present and 27.8% had a male householder with no spouse or partner present. 44.4% of all households were non-families. 30.6% of all households were made up of individuals, 9.7% had someone living alone who was 65 years old or older.

The median age in the city was 40.2 years. 24.4% of the residents were under the age of 20; 6.8% were between the ages of 20 and 24; 26.7% were from 25 and 44; 27.3% were from 45 and 64; and 14.8% were 65 years of age or older. The gender makeup of the city was 52.3% male and 47.7% female.

=== 2010 census ===
As of the census of 2010, there were 130 people in 57 households, including 37 families, in the city. The population density was 650.0 inhabitants per square mile (251.0/km^{2}). There were 66 housing units at an average density of 330.0 per square mile (127.4/km^{2}). The racial makup of the city was 99.2% White and 0.8% Pacific Islander.

Of the 57 households 29.8% had children under the age of 18 living with them, 47.4% were married couples living together, 7.0% had a female householder with no husband present, 10.5% had a male householder with no wife present, and 35.1% were non-families. 29.8% of households were one person and 10.5% were one person aged 65 or older. The average household size was 2.28 and the average family size was 2.84.

The median age was 43 years. 22.3% of residents were under the age of 18; 3.8% were between the ages of 18 and 24; 30% were from 25 to 44; 21.5% were from 45 to 64; and 22.3% were 65 or older. The gender makeup of the city was 52.3% male and 47.7% female.

=== 2000 census ===
As of the census of 2000, there were 126 people in 58 households, including 33 families, in the city. The population density was 635.1 inhabitants per square mile (245.2/km^{2}). There were 67 housing units at an average density of 337.7 per square mile (130.4/km^{2}). The racial makup of the city was 100.00% White.

Of the 58 households 20.7% had children under the age of 18 living with them, 51.7% were married couples living together, 3.4% had a female householder with no husband present, and 41.4% were non-families. 27.6% of households were one person and 6.9% were one person aged 65 or older. The average household size was 2.17 and the average family size was 2.74.

The age distribution was 16.7% under the age of 18, 12.7% from 18 to 24, 24.6% from 25 to 44, 34.1% from 45 to 64, and 11.9% 65 or older. The median age was 42 years. For every 100 females, there were 129.1 males. For every 100 females age 18 and over, there were 118.8 males.

The median household income was $47,500 and the median family income was $52,500. Males had a median income of $31,607 versus $24,375 for females. The per capita income for the city was $21,457. There were no families and 1.4% of the population living below the poverty line, including no under eighteens and none of those over 64.

== Education ==
The Winterset Community School District operates local public schools.

== See also ==
- KICP
