= WSUI =

Public radio station at the University of Iowa in Iowa City

- Iowa City, Iowa; United States
- Broadcast area: Eastern Iowa
- Frequency: 910 kHz
- Branding: Iowa Public Radio

Programming
- Format: Public news/talk
- Affiliations: National Public Radio

Ownership
- Owner: Iowa Public Radio, Inc.
- Sister stations: KSUI

History
- First air date: June 26, 1922 (originally experimental as 9YA 1915-1922)
- Former call signs: WHAA (1922–1925)
- Call sign meaning: State University of Iowa (legal name for the University of Iowa)

Technical information
- Licensing authority: FCC
- Facility ID: 63119
- Class: B
- Power: 5,000 watts day; 4,000 watts night
- Transmitter coordinates: 41°31′26″N 91°30′11″W

Links
- Public license information: Public file; LMS
- Webcast: Iowa Public Radio news stream
- Website: iowapublicradio.org

WSUI (910 AM) is a public radio station in Iowa City, Iowa. It is owned by Iowa Public Radio, Inc. and is a member of Iowa Public Radio's news network. Its signal serves most of eastern Iowa. WSUI is one of two National Public Radio member stations in the region, along with 90.9 KUNI in Cedar Falls. WSUI's sister station is classical music outlet 91.7 KSUI.

WSUI's studios and offices are on Grand Avenue in Des Moines. The transmitter is off Sand Road SE in Hills, Iowa.

== History ==
=== Experimental years ===
WSUI got its start in 1911, prior to the era of broadcast radio, operating a "wireless telegraph" transmitter under the experimental radio call sign 9YA. It began airing voice broadcasts in 1919, and was granted a full license on June 26, 1922, originally as WHAA. The call letters were randomly assigned from a sequential roster of available call signs.

WSUI may be the oldest educational station west of the Mississippi River. It was one of several AM stations opened by Midwestern universities in the early days of radio, along with Iowa State University's WOI, which also began Morse code transmissions in 1911, the University of Minnesota's KUOM and St. Louis University's WEW in 1912 and the University of Wisconsin's WHA in 1915.

The station's call sign, 9YA (the "Y" in the call sign indicating operation under a Technical and Training School license) was in use by the State University of Iowa—now the University of Iowa—since 1915, starting sometime after the installation of the university's first Morse code transmitter in 1913. As of 1916, university electrical engineering students were operating a 2,000 watt spark gap transmitter at a 750-meter wavelength that could be heard 1000 miles away, with two-way communications taking place within a 500-mile radius. The station aired 300-word lessons on a regular schedule that dealt with wireless communication.

=== Early sound broadcasts ===
Carl Menzer, whose interest in wireless began at his high school in Lone Tree, entered the State University of Iowa as a freshman in 1917, and later became station director for WHAA/WSUI, a position he held until his retirement in 1968. After the World War I moratorium on radio transmission was lifted in 1919, Menzer brought vacuum tube technology to 9YA, signaling the start of regularly scheduled voice and music broadcasts.

The first "radio telephone" station, built using two donated experimental vacuum tubes, required use of two microphones for voice and for pickup of a windup phonograph. The microphones were swapped frequently when the one in use became too hot to touch due to high current. In spite of audio quality and technical issues, the station gained a following among a collection of crystal radio enthusiasts. Within two years, it had inspired sufficient interest to cause State University of Iowa President Walter A. Jessup and other educators to envision the feasibility of advanced study in broadcasting. That led to an application for a university broadcast license. On June 26, 1922, the call sign WHAA was assigned. By the end of September, test transmissions were complete, and on October 17, 1922, the station was officially on the air. A gala on-air commemoration included a talk by President Jessup.

=== Switch to WSUI ===
WHAA changed its call sign to WSUI in 1925. WSUI represents the initials of State University of Iowa, the legal name of the University of Iowa. New radio stations in Iowa today have call signs beginning with a K. In the earliest days of broadcasting, stations in Iowa, such as WHO Des Moines and WOI in Ames, were given call letters starting with a W. In 1923, the boundary between K and W stations moved from the western border of Nebraska and South Dakota to the Mississippi River, putting Iowa in K territory. Despite this change, stations in Iowa that already had W call signs were apparently allowed to request new ones: besides WSUI, WJAM became WMT in 1928, and WKBB became WDBQ in 1952.

WSUI was a charter member when National Public Radio first began in 1971. It was one of the 90 stations to carry the inaugural broadcast of All Things Considered, NPR's signature afternoon news program. It also served as a source of NPR programming for the Quad Cities until that area got its own public radio station, WVIK, in 1980.

=== Studios and transmitter ===
WSUI's studios were located for many years in the university's Engineering Building. They were relocated to a former supermarket building, just south of the campus, in the late 1990s, when expansion of the College of Engineering required WSUI and KSUI to vacate their space. The studios are now located in a UI-owned building south of downtown Iowa City on Clinton Street. This building is shared by WSUI/KSUI with the Office of the State Archaeologist. Iowa Public Radio's main studios for the statewide operation are on Grand Avenue in Des Moines, just west of downtown Des Moines.

WSUI's original three self-supporting broadcast towers were located just west of Mormon Trek Boulevard on the far west side of the campus. On June 29, 1998, a fierce line of thunderstorms packing winds of nearly 100 miles-per-hour toppled two of the towers. For months afterwards, WSUI's nighttime power output from the single remaining tower was limited to 1,250 watts non-directional. Today, the towers are located about 10 miles south of Iowa City, in the community of Hills.

A single tower is used during the day, when the station has a non-directional signal. Due to the transmitter's power, as well as Iowa's flat land, with near-perfect soil conductivity, its daytime signal covers almost all of eastern Iowa and part of western Illinois. Power is fed to all three towers in a directional array at night to protect WLS in Chicago at nearby 890 AM, concentrating WSUI's signal northward toward the Cedar Rapids and Iowa City areas.

=== Notable alumni ===
WSUI alumni include Harry Kalas, who served as sports director for the campus radio station WSUI and did play-by-play for all types of sports. Kalas received baseball broadcasting's highest honor—the Ford Frick Award from the Baseball Hall of Fame.

Bob Miller is an American retired sportscaster, best known as the play-by-play announcer for the Los Angeles Kings of the National Hockey League. Miller was honored by the Hockey Hall of Fame as the 2000 recipient of the Foster Hewitt Memorial Award. The press box at Staples Center, the Kings' home arena, is named in his honor. When Miller was growing up, he wanted to be a baseball player, but his plans changed in college when he started working for the campus radio station, WSUI, at the University of Iowa.

=== Early television ===
Iowa is a pioneer in educational broadcasting. It is home to two of the oldest educational broadcast stations in the world, WSUI and WOI. In 1933, The University of Iowa experimental TV station W9XK, later W9XUI, provided twice a week video programming, with WSUI providing the audio channel.

By 1941, the FCC allocated TV channels 1 and 12 for the W9XUI television station. This early attempt at educational broadcasting ended with US entrance into World War II. The concept of pure educational television, which Dr. E.B. Kurtz and his Iowa colleagues pioneered, was buried by the commercial television system which dominated development of the electronic media in Iowa after World War II.

Although the University of Iowa applied for a construction permit for station WSUI-TV on channel 11 in February 1948, it was not granted before the FCC halted the issuance of any new permits eight months later in the Freeze of 1948. In 1951, the university supported the reallocation of channel 11 to Des Moines for an educational television station there, and its own permit does not appear in any further records. Iowa PBS's KIIN-TV (channel 12) signed on in 1970, returning educational television to the area.

== See also ==
- List of initial AM-band station grants in the United States
