= KSUI =

- Iowa City, Iowa; United States
- Broadcast area: Cedar Rapids; Quad Cities; Eastern Iowa
- Frequency: 91.7 MHz (HD Radio)
- Branding: Iowa Public Radio Classical

Programming
- Format: Classical music
- Subchannels: HD2: WOI-FM simulcast
- Network: NPR

Ownership
- Owner: Iowa Public Radio, Inc.

History
- First air date: September 1947
- Call sign meaning: State University of Iowa (legal name for the University of Iowa)

Technical information
- Licensing authority: FCC
- Facility ID: 66626
- Class: C
- ERP: 100,000 watts
- HAAT: 394 meters (1,293 ft)
- Transmitter coordinates: 41°43′15″N 91°20′30″W
- Translator: 101.7 K269EK (Dubuque)
- Repeater: 90.9 KUNI-HD2 (Cedar Falls)

Links
- Public license information: Public file; LMS
- Webcast: Stream
- Website: iowapublicradio.org

KSUI (91.7 FM) is a non-commercial radio station licensed to Iowa City, Iowa, United States. It is the flagship of Iowa Public Radio's classical music network. The main studios and offices are on Grand Avenue in Des Moines. News updates are supplied from National Public Radio (NPR).

KSUI's transmitter is sited on Baker Avenue near 250th Street in West Branch, Iowa, about 35 miles (56 km) southeast of Cedar Rapids and about 50 miles (80 km) west of the Quad Cities. Programming is also heard on low-power FM translator K268EK (101.7 FM) in Dubuque. KSUI broadcasts in HD Radio; the HD2 digital subchannel carries Iowa Public Radio's news and talk format from WOI-FM Ames.

== History ==
The station signed on the air in September 1947. It served as the FM sister station to WSUI 910 AM, among the oldest radio stations in America. The call letters represent "State University of Iowa," the formal name of the University of Iowa, the owner of both stations.

At first, both stations largely simulcast the same programming. But as FM radio became more popular, the AM station developed a news and information format, while the FM station became an outlet for classical music.
