= KICP =

Coordinates: 41.310°N 93.839°W

Patterson, Iowa; United States
- Broadcast area: Des Moines, Iowa
- Frequency: 105.9 MHz
- Branding: IPR Classical

Programming
- Format: Classical music
- Affiliations: Iowa Public Radio

Ownership
- Owner: Iowa Public Radio, Inc.

History
- First air date: 2006 (as KZLN)
- Former call signs: KIBB (2006); KZLN (2006–2007); KZWF (2007–2011); KZHZ (2011)

Technical information
- Licensing authority: FCC
- Facility ID: 164102
- Class: C3
- ERP: 15,000 watts
- HAAT: 192 meters (630 ft)

Links
- Public license information: Public file; LMS
- Webcast: Listen live
- Website: Iowa Public Radio

KICP (105.9 FM) is a radio station licensed to Patterson, Iowa. KICP serves the Central Iowa-Des Moines area. A sale of KICP and sister station KICL to Iowa State University was completed in early November 2011. Both stations went silent upon completion of the sale, but returned to the air on November 21, 2011, airing Iowa Public Radio's Classical Network.

== History ==
KZWF began life in February 2006 as KIBB, before changing its call sign again to KZLN in March 2006, then finally KZWF in December 2007. As KZWF, it was originally on the air as "The Wolf," along with sister station KZWU. However, owner Connoisseur Media quickly determined that listenership was very poor, and began drawing plans to reach the capital city of Des Moines. KZWF and KZWU were granted construction permits to upgrade, which would allow the stations to be heard in Des Moines. This would bring a 4th country station into the market (behind KJJY, KHKI, and KXIA). Since the CP was awarded, the two stations have been bouncing on and off the air, usually after Special Temporary Authority granted by the Federal Communications Commission expires. The latest STA issued stated that KZWF could not remain on the air due to "The Potential for Localized Reception Interference", as well as to finish preparations to increase transmitter power.

As of March 8, 2011, the station was at full power (now covering the Metropolitan Des Moines area) and stunting by playing a loop of baby sounds with announcements of a new station, which lasted about two to three days. Then on March 9, 2011, the station launched a rhythmic contemporary format known as "HITS 105.9," targeting competitor station KKDM. Since the launch, its playlist has featured more of a Dance/Pop feel as opposed to having a R&B/Hip-Hop flavor. This move brings the Rhythmic Top 40 format back to Des Moines for the first time since KDRB flipped to adult album alternative in 2005. On March 22, 2011, the call sign changed from KZWF to KZHZ to better reflect the HITS branding. Studios were located in nearby Indianola.

On August 5, 2011, Connoisseur announced the sale of both KZHZ and KZHC to Iowa State University, which planned to convert the two stations into non-commercial outlets as part of the Iowa Public Radio network. As a result, KZHZ became the second station in Des Moines to drop the rhythmic format, but on October 25, 2011, Saga Communications announced the move of the format to a new translator at 99.9 FM and the HD2 subchannel of classic hits KIOA.

On November 1, 2011, KZHZ changed its call letters to KICP.

Effective June 30, 2022, KICP's license was transferred to Iowa Public Radio, Inc.
