= KFJB =

- Marshalltown, Iowa; United States
- Frequency: 1230 kHz
- Branding: The Source

Programming
- Format: News/talk and sports
- Affiliations: ABC News Radio; Fox News Radio; SportsMap; Compass Media Networks; Premiere Networks; Westwood One; Motor Racing Network

Ownership
- Owner: Robert and Colleen Holtan; (Trending Media, Inc.)

History
- First air date: June 2, 1923

Technical information
- Licensing authority: FCC
- Facility ID: 40465
- Class: C
- Power: 1,000 watts
- Transmitter coordinates: 42°3′51″N 92°58′3″W
- Translator: 93.9 K230CB (Marshalltown)

Links
- Public license information: Public file; LMS
- Website: www.1230KFJB.com

KFJB (1230 AM) is a commercial radio station in Marshalltown, Iowa, which broadcasts a news/talk and sports format. The station is licensed to Trending Media, Inc. It broadcasts with a 1,000 watt non-directional antenna. Its programming is also carried by a 250 watt FM translator, K230CB, at 93.9 MHz.

== Programming ==
Weekdays begin on KFJB with a local morning news and information show, as well as an hour of news at noon. The rest of the daytime schedule is made up of nationally syndicated programming, including Brian Kilmeade, Sean Hannity and This Morning, America's First News with Gordon Deal. Most weekday hours begin with world and national news from ABC News Radio. Nights and weekends, sports programming is carried from SB Nation Radio.

== History ==
KFJB is one of Iowa's oldest radio stations. It was founded by Earl N. Peak, president of Marshall Electric Company. In 1922 Peak asked Merle Easter, a Marshall Electric engineer, and Chauncey Hoover if they could build a "radio-telephone station". A five-wire transmitting antenna was mounted on poles on the west side of the Marshall Electric building at 1603 West Main Street at the corner of 16th and Main, for use by a 10-watt homemade transmitter. Even with this low power, reception reports were received from as far away as Canada and the Hawaiian Islands. Operations reportedly began in the spring of 1922, under amateur radio authorizations with the call signs 9DCV, licensed to Merle Frank Easter, and 9LT, licensed to the Marshall Electric Company.

A station history reports it was the first in the country to remotely broadcast a high school football game. The station was three blocks away from Franklin Field, and Peak was able to string a cable between the studio and the football field to facilitate the broadcast.

On June 2, 1923, the US Department of Commerce, which regulated radio at this time, granted Marshall Electric a commercial broadcast license, for 10 watts on 1210 kHz. The call letters, KFJB, were randomly assigned from an alphabetical roster of available call signs. On November 11, 1928, under the provisions of the Federal Radio Commission's General Order 40, KFJB was reassigned to 1200 kHz, on a timesharing basis with WMT, then in Waterloo, Iowa. The next year WMT moved to 600 kHz, so KFJB no longer had to share its assignment.

In March 1941, with the implementation of the North American Regional Broadcasting Agreement, most stations on 1200 kHz, including KFJB, were moved to 1230 kHz. The station was purchased by the Times-Republican Printing Company in 1947. Its owners, the Norris family, maintained control of KFJB AM and FM until December 29, 1986, when it was purchased by Marshalltown Broadcasting, Inc.

KFJB-FM, which became KMTG in September 1986, was changed to KXIA in June 1987. KFJB-FM began broadcast operations in 1968, with a power of 27,000 watts. It is now classified as a C1 station, which allows a maximum power of 100,000 watts and a maximum antenna height of 1,000 feet.

KFJB is one of the few radio stations in the U.S. to have the same call letters for its entire history, dating back to the early days of broadcasting. In 2012 KFJB celebrated its 90th anniversary on the air.

== FM translator ==
KFJB is rebroadcast on the FM band by translator station K230CB.

Broadcast translator for KFJB
Call sign	Frequency	City of license	FID	ERP (W)	HAAT	Class	Transmitter coordinates	FCC info
K230CB	93.9 FM	Marshalltown, Iowa	201125	250	104 m (341 ft)	D	42°01′21″N 92°59′58″W	LMS
