= KNSL =

Iowa Public Radio station in Lamoni, Iowa

- Lamoni, Iowa; United States
- Broadcast area: South Central Iowa, North Central Missouri
- Frequency: 97.9 MHz
- Branding: Iowa Public Radio

Programming
- Format: Public news/talk and adult alternative music

Ownership
- Owner: Iowa Public Radio, Inc.

History
- First air date: August 6, 1984
- Former call signs: KLAL (1984–1997); KASD (1997); KIIC (1997–2005); KOWI (2005–2012)
- Call sign meaning: News and Studio One in Lamoni

Technical information
- Licensing authority: FCC
- Facility ID: 81325
- Class: C2
- ERP: 50,000 watts
- HAAT: 150 meters (490 ft)
- Transmitter coordinates: 40°48′52″N 93°50′15″W

Links
- Public license information: Public file; LMS
- Webcast: Listen live
- Website: Iowa Public Radio

KNSL (97.9 MHz) is a public radio station licensed to Lamoni, Iowa, United States. The station is owned by Iowa Public Radio, Inc. (IPR)

KNSL carries Iowa Public Radio's "News" and "Studio One" services, featuring news/talk programming from IPR and National Public Radio in the daytime. In the evenings, the station carries "Studio One," airing adult album alternative music on weeknights, with jazz, blues and folk music also heard on weekends. KNSL is a simulcast of WOI-FM, the flagship station in Ames, Iowa.

== History ==
On August 6, 1984, the station signed on as KLAL. It was initially on 97.7 MHz, broadcasting at only 1,300 watts, a fraction of its current power. Dwaine F. Meyer was the owner, and KLAL played adult contemporary music.

Around 1997, the station went off the air to rebuild and move one notch up the dial to 97.9 MHz. That was coupled with a boost in power to 50,000 watts. When it returned to the airwaves, it was KIIC, owned by Continental Broadcasting of Iowa, which played classic country music.

In 2004, Iowa Public Radio paid $450,000 to buy the station. It became a non-commercial public station. The following year, the call sign was changed to KOWI. In 2012, the call sign was switched to KNSL to indicate that the station is an affiliate of IPR's "News" and "Studio One" networks in Lamoni.
