= KCHE-FM =

- Cherokee, Iowa; United States
- Frequency: 92.1 MHz
- Branding: KCHE FM 92.1

Programming
- Format: Classic hits
- Affiliations: USA Radio News

Ownership
- Owner: Simon Fuller; (Better Broadcasting Incorporated)
- Sister stations: KCHE (AM)

History
- First air date: December 9, 1976
- Call sign meaning: CHErokee

Technical information
- Licensing authority: FCC
- Facility ID: 60491
- Class: A
- ERP: 6,000 watts
- HAAT: 64 metres (210 feet)
- Transmitter coordinates: 42°47′21″N 95°33′08″W

Links
- Public license information: Public file; LMS
- Webcast: Listen Live
- Website: kcheradio.com

KCHE-FM (92.1 MHz) is a commercial radio station licensed to serve the community of Cherokee, Iowa. The station primarily broadcasts a classic hits format. KCHE-FM is owned by Simon Fuller, through licensee Better Broadcasting Incorporated.

Former owners include Sioux Valley Broadcasting Company, Inc, Cherokee Broadcasting Company, and J & J Broadcasting Corporation.

According to the Antenna Structure Registration database, the broadcast tower is 92 metres (302 feet) tall with the antenna mounted at the 89 metres (292 feet) level. The antenna array is a Harris Corporation model FML-3E. The tower is shared with its sister station KCHE (AM). The broadcast site is located one mile north of Cherokee on U.S. Route 59.
