= KICW =

Coordinates: 40.961°N 92.370°W

- Ottumwa, Iowa; United States
- Frequency: 91.1 MHz
- Branding: IPR Classical

Programming
- Format: Classical music
- Affiliations: Iowa Public Radio, NPR, American Public Media

Ownership
- Owner: Iowa Public Radio, Inc.

History
- First air date: April 19, 2005 (as KUNZ)
- Former call signs: KUNZ (2005–2012)

Technical information
- Licensing authority: FCC
- Facility ID: 83086
- Class: A
- ERP: 1,450 watts
- HAAT: 137 meters (449 ft)

Links
- Public license information: Public file; LMS
- Webcast: Listen live
- Website: Iowa Public Radio

KICW (91.1 FM) is a radio station licensed to Ottumwa, Iowa. The station is owned by Iowa Public Radio, Inc., and carries the network's "Classical Network" services.

- See also Iowa Public Radio
