= KIHK =

- Rock Valley, Iowa; United States
- Broadcast area: Sioux Center, Iowa
- Frequency: 106.9 MHz
- Branding: Hawk Country 106.9

Programming
- Format: Country
- Affiliations: Fox News Radio

Ownership
- Owner: Community First Broadcasting.
- Sister stations: KSOU, KSOU-FM

History
- Former call signs: KDUT (1996–1997)
- Call sign meaning: "Iowa's Hawk"

Technical information
- Licensing authority: FCC
- Facility ID: 57074
- Class: C3
- ERP: 25,000 watts
- HAAT: 100 meters
- Transmitter coordinates: 43°20′28″N 96°19′3″W

Links
- Public license information: Public file; LMS
- Webcast: Listen Live
- Website: Official website

KIHK (106.9 FM, "Hawk Country 106.9") is a radio station broadcasting a country music format. Located near Rock Valley, Iowa, United States, the station serves the Sioux Center, Iowa area, along with rimshot coverage in Sioux Falls, South Dakota. The station is currently owned by Sorenson Broadcasting Corp.

== History ==
The station was assigned the call letters KDUT on 1996-02-01. On 1997-03-31, the station changed its call sign to the current KIHK.

Previous logo
