= KKSO (FM) =

- Mitchellville, Iowa; United States
- Broadcast area: Des Moines, Iowa
- Frequency: 88.9 MHz
- Branding: Studio One

Programming
- Format: Adult album alternative
- Network: Iowa Public Radio
- Affiliations: NPR, American Public Media

Ownership
- Owner: Iowa Public Radio, Inc.

History
- First air date: 2005 (as KDMR)
- Former call signs: KDMR (2003–2011); KICJ (2011–2024)
- Call sign meaning: Studio One

Technical information
- Licensing authority: FCC
- Facility ID: 90336
- Class: A
- ERP: 1,000 watts
- HAAT: 72 meters (236 ft)
- Transmitter coordinates: 41°40′05″N 93°19′43″W
- Translators: 94.1 K231DI (Des Moines); 97.7 K249EJ (Des Moines)

Links
- Public license information: Public file; LMS
- Webcast: Listen live
- Website: iowapublicradio.org

KKSO (88.9 FM), formerly KICJ, is a radio station licensed to Mitchellville, Iowa, serving the Des Moines area. The station is owned by Iowa Public Radio (IPR), and carries the network's adult album alternative service.

On August 29, 2024, KICJ changed its format from classical to adult alternative, branded as "Studio One" under new KKSO call letters. It and translator K231DI (94.1 FM) were the first 24-hour outlets for "Studio One"; IPR had already offered a 24-hour Internet radio feed of the format, but its programming was otherwise carried at night on FM stations that carry news programming during the day, including WOI-FM. While the call sign was chosen by IPR to reflect the "Studio One" identity, it was previously used in Des Moines on 1390 AM as a tribute to the original KSO.

== See also ==
- Iowa Public Radio
