= KMCN =

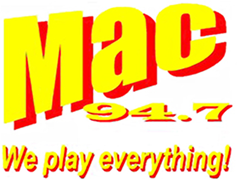
- Clinton, Iowa; United States
- Frequency: 94.7 MHz
- Branding: Mac FM

Programming
- Format: Adult hits

Ownership
- Owner: Brad and Ashley Gendreau; (Gendreau Broadcast LLC)
- Sister stations: KCLN

History
- First air date: December 7, 1970 (as KCLN-FM)
- Former call signs: KCLN-FM (1970–1978); KLNQ (1978–1980); KNJY (1980–1987); KCLN-FM (1987–1998); KZEG (1998–2005)
- Call sign meaning: K MaC North

Technical information
- Licensing authority: FCC
- Facility ID: 33054
- Class: A
- ERP: 3,000 watts
- HAAT: 100 m (330 ft)
- Transmitter coordinates: 41°54′34″N 90°13′28″W

Links
- Public license information: Public file; LMS
- Webcast: Listen Live
- Website: KMCN Online

KMCN (94.7 FM) is a radio station licensed to Clinton, Iowa that broadcasts an Adult Hits format under the branding Mac 94.7. The transmitter for KMCN is co-located with the transmitter of sister AM station KCLN in northern Clinton. In addition to the music format, KMCN broadcasts selected local Clinton area programming, mainly remote broadcasts of occasional special broadcasts of community events.

== History ==
=== Early history (1970 to 1998) ===
The current KMCN-FM went on-the-air as KCLN-FM 97.7 on December 7, 1970. The station used its KCLN-AM programming to simulcast broadcasts in the early 1970s as many AM radio stations did in back during that period. From 1976 to 1978, the station experimented and flipped its format to a hybrid of Top 40 with live disc jockeys mostly independent of its sister station. Under the watchful eye of P.D. Bill "The Wildman" Warner, the station's moniker became "Rock 98", playing a blend of Top 40, Album Rock, Disco, Adult Contemporary as well as some Oldies.

On-Air Personalities at that time were: The Wildman, Fran Scheiden, Joel Craig, Mark Cooper, Bryan Bradford, Eugene Jeffreys, Mary Witt, Kim Long and Kelly Long.

After that short experimental period, the station changed call letters and went to a "reel-to-reel" automated Top 40 format as KLNQ-FM in June 1978. Then the station reorganized and call letters were changed to KNJY-FM and became an Automated Adult Contemporary station on July 1, 1980. KNJY once more changed its call sign to back to KCLN-FM on June 15, 1987. Throughout those early years, the station aired country music, beautiful music, middle-of-the-road music, Top 40 music as "Rock 98" and Adult Contemporary music formats.

The station eventually switched frequencies to 94.7 FM on August 8, 1998, and at the same time adopted the call letters KZEG-FM. The current KMCN-FM call sign was adopted on November 2, 2005.

=== The Eagle 94.7 (1998 to 2005) ===
KZEG broadcast a country music format from 1998 to 2005, and was known as The Eagle 94.7. In November 2005, both KZEG and Muscatine-based sister station KWCC were owned by WPW Broadcasting, which later became Prairie Radio Communications.

=== The New MaC FM-93.1 and 94.7 (2005 to present) ===
The switch from country music to adult hits on both stations happened in November 2005, with the format branded as "93.1 and 94.7 Mac FM" KZEG changed its call letters to KMCN, for "Mac North", while KWCC changed its call letters to KMCS, for "Mac South". The stations target, as well as their home cities, the "Quad Cities" market along the Iowa–Illinois border. The music mix, meanwhile generally included pop, rock and soul from the early 1970s to the present day.

George Lowe is the radio voice for Mac FM.

On January 14, 2013, KMCS dropped from the simulcast and flipped to "Vintage Sound 93.1", airing classic album rock. KMCN continues on with the "Mac FM" format. The station also had a competitor of sorts with KQCJ, which had aired an adult hits format as "Jack FM", but has since flipped to alternative rock as Planet 93.9.
