= KCLN =

- Clinton, Iowa; United States
- Frequency: 1390 kHz
- Branding: 1390 KCLN

Programming
- Format: Oldies
- Affiliations: ABC Radio

Ownership
- Owner: Brad and Ashley Gendreau; (Gendreau Broadcast LLC)
- Sister stations: KMCN

History
- First air date: 1956
- Call sign meaning: K C L i N ton

Technical information
- Licensing authority: FCC
- Facility ID: 33055
- Class: D
- Power: 1,000 watts (daytime); 91 watts (nighttime)
- Transmitter coordinates: 41°54′34″N 90°13′28″W

Links
- Public license information: Public file; LMS
- Webcast: Listen Live
- Website: KCLN Online

KCLN (1390 AM) is a commercial radio station licensed to serve the community of Clinton, Iowa. KCLN primarily airs an automated oldies format. KCLN and its sister station KMCN 94.7 MHz (formerly 97.7 MHz) were owned from 1999 to 2018 by Prairie Radio Communications, which purchased the facilities from K to Z Ltd. who had been the owners of the AM/FM combo since 1990. KCLN began broadcasting in 1956. The KCLN call letters supposedly were an initialism for "Keep Clinton Listeners Notified". They changed the call letters to KLNT which existed from 1978 to 1998. The format was generally Country Music and then Adult Standards during that time. KLNT returned to using the KCLN call sign when their sister station switched from KCLN-FM to KZEG.

The KCLN-AM antenna uses two towers arranged in a directional array, concentrating the signal north–south along the Mississippi River. One of the two towers hosts the FM antenna for sister station KMCN.

Effective March 15, 2018, Prairie Radio sold KCLN and KMCN to Gendreau Broadcast LLC for $240,000.
