= KEWS =

Radio station in Sac City, Iowa (2008–2015)

Sac City, Iowa; United States
- Frequency: 104.7 MHz

Programming
- Format: Defunct

Ownership
- Owner: Radioactive, LLC

History
- Former call signs: WJLL (2008); KJLN (2008–2012)

Technical information
- Licensing authority: FCC
- Facility ID: 164236
- Class: A
- ERP: 375 watts
- HAAT: 9 meters (30 ft)
- Transmitter coordinates: 42°25′18″N 94°58′24″W

Links
- Public license information: Public file; LMS

KEWS (104.7 FM) was a radio station licensed to Sac City, Iowa, United States. The station was owned by Radioactive, LLC.

== History ==
The Federal Communications Commission (FCC) issued a construction permit for the station on March 9, 2005. The station was assigned the call sign WJLL on February 15, 2008, and, on March 10, 2008, changed its call sign to KJLN. The station was granted its license to cover on June 24, 2008, but later went silent. On January 15, 2012, the station changed its call sign to KEWS.

Radioactive surrendered KEWS' license to the FCC on April 20, 2015; the FCC cancelled the license the next day.
