= KIFG (AM) =

- Iowa Falls, Iowa; United States
- Frequency: 1510 (kHz)
- Branding: Iowa River Radio

Programming
- Format: Classic hits

Ownership
- Owner: Times-Citizen Communications, Inc.
- Sister stations: KIFG-FM

History
- First air date: 1962

Technical information
- Licensing authority: FCC
- Facility ID: 52021
- Class: D
- Power: 1,000 watts (daytime); 500 watts (critical hours)
- Transmitter coordinates: 42°30′52″N 93°12′53″W

Links
- Public license information: Public file; LMS
- Website: KIFG Online

KIFG (1510 AM) is a commercial radio station serving the Iowa Falls, Iowa area. The station primarily broadcasts a classic hits format. KIFG is licensed to Times-Citizen Communications, Inc and has a daytime-only license.

== History ==
On June 30, 2010, KIFG changed their format from adult contemporary to classic hits.
