= KMSC (FM) =

Radio station at Morningside College in Sioux City, Iowa

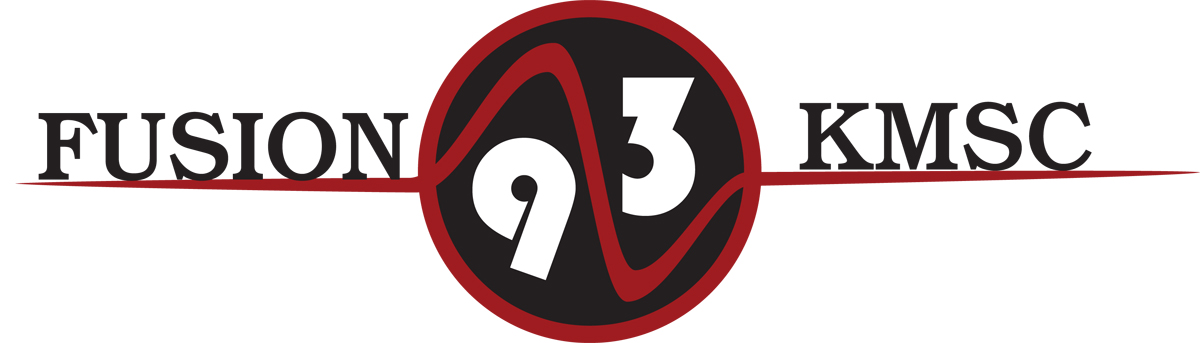
- Sioux City, Iowa; United States
- Frequency: 92.9 MHz
- Branding: Fusion 93

Programming
- Format: Alternative

Ownership
- Owner: Morningside University

History
- First air date: 1978
- Call sign meaning: "Morningside College"

Technical information
- Licensing authority: FCC
- Facility ID: 43807
- Class: D
- Power: 13 watts
- ERP: 12 watts
- HAAT: 56.0 meters
- Transmitter coordinates: 42°28′28″N 96°21′34″W

Links
- Public license information: Public file; LMS
- Webcast: On Shoutcast
- Website: www.morningside.edu/campus-life-and-arts/campus-activities/clubs-and-organizations/campus-media/

KMSC 92.9 FM is a college radio station broadcasting an alternative format at Morningside University in Sioux City, Iowa, United States. Students are able to participate regardless of their field of study, with some classes requiring participation in KMSC's on-air presence. Students host their own shows ranging from shows about wrestling to political talk shows.

== History ==
Broadcast radio at Morningside College first started with a "Marconi station" built in the 1910s by some physics students and only capable of sending Morse code signals. Voice broadcasting was inaugurated with radio station KFMR 1150 AM, which operated between 1923 and 1928 at a power of 100 watts. KFMR was among the earliest educational stations in the country (the very first educational stations at the Universities of Minnesota and Wisconsin went on the air in 1922). However, it was not until April 1978 that college radio returned to Morningside with the start of KMSC, thanks in part to the FCC's adoption of new (at the time) non-commercial/educational FM regulations.

== Awards ==
In 2006, the station received the Eric Sevareid Award for first place in the category of student radio play-by-play by the Northwest Broadcast News Association (NBNA). KMSC received the award for its football broadcast of Morningside's 35–13 victory against Hastings College on October 29, 2005. Casey Gibbs, a senior from Garnavillo, Iowa, and Josh Creekmore, a former student from Hartington, Nebraska, were the student broadcasters.

In 2004 and 2006, KMSC was voted a "Siouxland Choice" radio station by readers of The Weekender newspaper.

== Political Programming ==
The station broadcasts some local appearances by presidential candidates. Recent political broadcasts have featured Senators Christopher Dodd, Barack Obama, and John McCain. On election night, KMSC marshals some 60 mass communications, political science and other students for a marathon "count the vote" broadcast.

== Movement from 88.3 FM to 92.9 FM ==
KMSC moved to a new frequency due to interference with newly licensed KFHC, broadcasting on adjacent channel 88.1 FM and operated by St. Gabriel Communications, Ltd.. KFHC's license to broadcast was granted on March 14, 2008. Due to the limitations inherent with operating as a low-power "Class D" station, KMSC was forced to give deference to KFHC's signal and discontinue broadcasting. The station filed an application with the FCC to resume broadcasting on 92.9 FM, with the application being granted on June 27, 2008. The station can also be heard via the streaming audio link on its website .

== See also ==
- Campus radio
- List of college radio stations in the United States
