= KDAO (AM) =

- Marshalltown, Iowa; United States
- Frequency: 1190 kHz
- Branding: Oldies 1190 AM and 103.7 FM

Programming
- Format: Oldies

Ownership
- Owner: MTN Broadcasting, Inc.
- Sister stations: KDAO-FM

History
- First air date: 1978

Technical information
- Licensing authority: FCC
- Facility ID: 46754
- Class: D
- Power: 250 watts (daytime); 20 watts (nighttime)
- Transmitter coordinates: 42°04′17″N 92°55′19″W
- Translators: 92.7 K224FM (Grundy Center); 103.7 K279AN (Marshalltown)

Links
- Public license information: Public file; LMS
- Website: kdao.com/kdao-am

KDAO (1190 AM) is a commercial radio station serving the Marshalltown, Iowa area. The station broadcasts an oldies format. KDAO is licensed to MTN Broadcasting, Inc, but entered a management agreement with OnTheGoMedia Inc. for 1 year.
