= KURE =

Student-run radio station at Iowa State University in Ames, Iowa

88.5 KURE
- Ames, Iowa; United States
- Broadcast area: Ames, Iowa
- Frequency: 88.5 MHz
- Branding: Iowa State's Student-Run Radio Station

Programming
- Format: College Radio

Ownership
- Owner: Residence Association Broadcasting Services, Inc.

History
- Former call signs: KMRA (1949–1950); KMRI (1950–1961); KISU (1961–1970); KPGY (1970–1983); KUSR (1983–1996)

Technical information
- Licensing authority: FCC
- Facility ID: 55777
- Class: A
- ERP: 630 watts
- HAAT: 22.0 meters
- Transmitter coordinates: 42°1′47.00″N 93°38′51.00″W

Links
- Public license information: KURE Public file; LMS
- Webcast: KURE Webcast
- Website: Official website

KURE (88.5 FM) is a student-run radio station at Iowa State University in Ames, Iowa. The station serves the Iowa State community, Ames, and surrounding areas. The broadcast license is currently owned by Residence Association Broadcasting Services, Inc. The station has been led by its general manager Carly Nichols since Spring 2023.

The station features a variety of programming, including most genres of music, talk shows, and coverage of ISU sporting events. Hip hop, electronica, rock, americana, classical, and jazz are just a few of the music genres played by KURE's constantly rotating staff of student DJs. Music played at KURE is selected by DJs with some influence from a board of student music reviewers. Sections of non-primetime schedule that are not covered by a dedicated DJ are filled by an automated music system, which staff have nicknamed "Ottobot". The station also provides coverage of Iowa State football, basketball, and wrestling. Additionally, this station provides occasional news and talk style programming.

== Kaleidoquiz ==
KURE annually produces Kaleidoquiz, a 26-hour team competition that involves trivia questions read over the air every six minutes, scavenger hunts, traveling questions, and other contests interspersed throughout the 26 hours. Kaleidoquiz is conducted by KURE DJs over the air waves and online. In recent years, the use of the internet has made this competition more accessible and the questions more difficult. In previous years, Kaleidoquiz has sent teams as far away as Toronto, Canada and required teams to do everything from pulling a bus to bringing "Your mom in a wedding dress" in as a scavenger hunt item.

In 2017, Kaleidoquiz celebrated its 50th year in existence by joking about doing 50 hours of Kaleidoquiz.

== KURE Fest ==
KURE annually hosts KURE Fest a free music festival bringing in touring and local artists to perform in the Memorial Union of Iowa State. It has brought artists such as Dan Deacon, Alex G, and George Clanton to Iowa State previously.

== History ==
Previously using the call letters KMRA, KMRI, KISU, KPGY, and KUSR; KURE was established in the mid-1990s. In addition to being student-managed and student-produced, KURE is also funded by students at Iowa State University through the student government. KURE has always been staffed entirely by student volunteers.

According to the station's board of directors, KURE got its start as KMRA, broadcasting out of a Friley dorm room on 640 AM, on Oct. 17, 1949. Friley residents Cedric Curin, Chuck Hawley and Maurice Voland founded the station with two turntables, a small transmitter and a public address system.

Powered by one quarter of a watt, the signal was only able to provide Friley Hall with entertainment. A boost to 50 watts and implementation of the carrier current method allowed the station to use local power lines as its broadcast antennas and make its programming audible across all of campus.

In 1950, KMRA became KMRI. In 1961, KMRI became KISU. KISU applied for new call letters and in 1970 was given them—KPGY.

1969 brought the station to its current location in the basement of Friley, and the jump to the FM band was made in 1970. The initial frequency was 91.9 with a call of KPGY, "The Big Pig in the Sky". In the late 1970s the decision was made to increase power to 200 watts, move the transmitter from Friley to the north side of campus resulting in a frequency change to 91.5 to protect another station on a nearby frequency. KUSR suspended broadcast operations Nov. 1, 1995, due to complications with its license. KURE went back on the air on August 12, 1996, after changing its frequency to 88.5.

The station now provides coverage to all of Ames as KURE 88.5 FM Ames Alternative.

== See also ==
- Campus radio
- List of college radio stations in the United States
