= KQCR-FM =

- Parkersburg, Iowa; United States
- Broadcast area: Hampton, Iowa
- Frequency: 98.9 MHz
- Branding: 99 The Wave

Programming
- Format: Yacht rock

Ownership
- Owner: Shawn Dietz; (OnTheGoMedia, Inc.)
- Sister stations: KLMJ

History
- First air date: November 2000

Technical information
- Licensing authority: FCC
- Facility ID: 78272
- Class: A
- ERP: 6,000 watts
- HAAT: 100 m (330 ft)
- Transmitter coordinates: 42°33′47″N 92°57′22″W

Links
- Public license information: Public file; LMS
- Webcast: Listen Live
- Website: radioonthego.com

KQCR-FM (98.9 MHz) is a 6,000-watt radio station licensed by the FCC for operation in Parkersburg, Iowa, with its broadcast originating from Hampton, Iowa and its tower located between Aplington, Iowa and Ackley, Iowa. KQCR-FM serves Franklin and Butler Counties, as well as portions of Hardin, Wright, Cerro Gordo, Floyd, Hamilton, Hancock, and Grundy Counties.

Previous logo

The station first began broadcasting in November 2000, playing mostly adult contemporary music. KQCR also features live coverage of high school sporting activities and local events such as the Butler County Fair.

On March 24, 2023, it was announced that the station would flip its format to a yacht rock format under the branding name "99 The Wave" on March 27.
