= KILJ (AM) =

- Mount Pleasant, Iowa; United States
- Frequency: 1130 kHz
- Branding: KILJ 1130 AM 98.5 FM

Programming
- Format: Country

Ownership
- Owner: KILJ, Inc.
- Sister stations: KILJ-FM

History
- First air date: December 1974 (as KKSI)
- Former call signs: KKSI (1974–1984)

Technical information
- Licensing authority: FCC
- Facility ID: 34605
- Class: D
- Power: 250 watts (daytime); 22 watts (nighttime)
- Transmitter coordinates: 40°57′38″N 91°35′05″W
- Translator: 98.5 K253CN (Mount Pleasant)

Links
- Public license information: Public file; LMS
- Webcast: Listen Live
- Website: www.kilj.com

KILJ (1130 AM) is a commercial radio station serving the Mount Pleasant, Iowa area. The station primarily broadcasts a country music format. KILJ is licensed to KILJ, Inc.

In addition to the music, the station provides national, state and local news, along with high school and college sports, weather, and grain and livestock markets.

Prior to 1984, the station's callsign was KKSI. When it was purchased by the owners of KILJ-FM, it was changed to KILJ.
