= KLGA-FM =

- Algona, Iowa; United States
- Frequency: 92.7 MHz

Programming
- Format: Adult contemporary
- Affiliations: ABC News Radio

Ownership
- Owner: Bernadette Merrill; (A2Z Broadcasting, LLC)
- Sister stations: KLGZ

History
- First air date: 1971
- Call sign meaning: ALGonA or KalL George Allen (KL GA)

Technical information
- Licensing authority: FCC
- Facility ID: 35428
- Class: C3
- ERP: 3,500 watts
- HAAT: 137 meters (449 ft)
- Transmitter coordinates: 43°4′5″N 94°12′8″W

Links
- Public license information: Public file; LMS
- Webcast: Listen Live
- Website: algonaradio.com

KLGA-FM (92.7 MHz) is a radio station broadcasting an adult contemporary format. Licensed to serve Algona, Iowa, United States, the station is currently owned by Bernadette Merrill, through licensee A2Z Broadcasting, LLC.

== History ==
The station was first licensed on March 31, 1971.

The station features longtime Morning Host and Farm Director Al Lauck, News with Brian Wilson and Sports with Marc Grandi. It provides sports news, local news, and other relevant items.
