= KILJ-FM =

- Mount Pleasant, Iowa; United States
- Frequency: 105.5 MHz
- Branding: Smooth Sounds

Programming
- Format: Easy listening

Ownership
- Owner: KILJ, Inc.
- Sister stations: KILJ (AM)

History
- First air date: October 30, 1970

Technical information
- Licensing authority: FCC
- Facility ID: 34604
- Class: C3
- ERP: 24,000 watts
- HAAT: 103 m (338 ft)
- Transmitter coordinates: 40°56′55″N 91°33′55″W

Links
- Public license information: Public file; LMS
- Webcast: Listen live
- Website: kilj.com

KILJ-FM (105.5 FM) is a commercial radio station that serves the Mount Pleasant, Iowa area. The station broadcasts an easy listening format. KILJ-FM is licensed to KILJ Inc which is owned by Paul and Joyce Dennison. They also own sister station KILJ 1130 AM.

In addition to the music, the station provides national, state and local news, along with high school and college sports, weather, and grain and livestock markets.

According to the company website, the station was started by Frosty Mitchell and former Iowa governor Robert D. Ray in 1970. Paul and Joyce Dennison purchased the station in 1977.

The sports department is headed by Slaten Swords, providing play-by-play for several southeast Iowa prep programs.

Yorke Prough leads the news department.

The transmitter and broadcast tower are located southwest of Mount Pleasant on Oakland Mills Road. According to the Antenna Structure Registration database, the tower is 104.5 m (343 ft) tall with the FM broadcast antenna mounted at the 99 m (325 ft) level. The calculated Height Above Average Terrain is 103 m (338 ft).
