= KSOU-FM =

Adult contemporary radio station in Sioux Center, Iowa

- Sioux Center, Iowa; United States
- Broadcast area: Sioux City, Iowa
- Frequency: 93.9 MHz
- Branding: 93.9 KSOU

Programming
- Format: Adult contemporary
- Affiliations: Fox News Radio; Fox Sports Radio

Ownership
- Owner: Community First Broadcasting.
- Sister stations: KSOU, KIHK

History
- First air date: 1974; 52 years ago (as KVDB-FM)
- Former call signs: KVDB-FM (1974–1989); KTSB (1989–1996)
- Call sign meaning: SiOUx

Technical information
- Licensing authority: FCC
- Facility ID: 67773
- Class: C2
- ERP: 50,000 watts
- HAAT: 150 meters (490 ft)
- Transmitter coordinates: 43°05′01″N 96°18′20″W

Links
- Public license information: Public file; LMS
- Webcast: Listen live
- Website: www.siouxcountyradio.com

KSOU-FM (93.9 MHz) is a radio station broadcasting an adult contemporary format. Serving the Sioux Center area in the U.S. state of Iowa, the station is licensed to Sorenson Broadcasting Corp.

== History ==
The station began broadcasting in 1974 as KVDB-FM, with "VDB" being a subtle reference to its owner, Russell Vande Brake. KVDB-FM was the sister station to KVDB (1090 AM, now KSOU), which broadcast from the same studio. During the day, they had separate programming, but in the evening, an easy listening format was simulcast over both stations.

On August 1, 1989, the station changed its call sign to KTSB; on April 1, 1996, it changed to the current KSOU-FM.
