= KUNI (FM) =

- Cedar Falls, Iowa; United States
- Broadcast area: Waterloo, Iowa
- Frequency: 90.9 MHz (HD Radio)
- Branding: Iowa Public Radio

Programming
- Format: News, adult album alternative
- Subchannels: HD2: KSUI simulcast (Classical music)
- Affiliations: American Public Media; NPR; Public Radio Exchange

Ownership
- Owner: Iowa Public Radio, Inc.

History
- First air date: September 15, 1960
- Call sign meaning: University of Northern Iowa

Technical information
- Licensing authority: FCC
- Facility ID: 69158
- Class: C
- ERP: 100,000 watts
- HAAT: 524 meters (1,719 ft)
- Transmitter coordinates: 42°18′59″N 91°51′31″W
- Translators: 94.5 K233AA (Davenport); 95.3 K237GD (Iowa City); 102.1 K271AF (Eldridge)

Links
- Public license information: Public file; LMS
- Webcast: Stream
- Website: Iowa Public Radio

KUNI (90.9 MHz) is an FM radio station owned and operated by Iowa Public Radio (IPR) in Cedar Falls. It is one of two NPR outlets for Eastern Iowa; the other being WSUI in Iowa City. KUNI's transmitter is in Walker, Iowa, with its primary signal covering Cedar Falls, Waterloo, Cedar Rapids and Iowa City. KUNI's programming is simulcast on full-power satellite KNSM (91.5 FM) in Mason City. KUNI also has three low-power FM translators: K233AA (94.5 FM) in Davenport, K237GD (95.3 FM) in Iowa City, and K274AA (102.1 FM) in Eldridge.

Programming is mostly NPR news and talk, with some KUNI produced music programs in the evenings and on weekends. It is the flagship of IPR's "News and Studio One" service, which combines NPR news and talk programming with an extension of the "Live from Studio One" adult album alternative program that aired on KUNI for years before the creation of IPR.

Announcer Bob Dorr had been involved with the station since 1972, producing programs of classic rock and roll recordings and live concerts featuring Iowa talent. He is also a harmonica player and heads the blues band, The Blue Band; which was inducted into the Iowa Rock and Roll Hall of Fame in 2007. Dorr retired from full-time broadcasting in 2009 but plans to produce occasional shows in the future.

Former logo
