= KSIB (AM) =

- Creston, Iowa; United States
- Frequency: 1520 kHz C-QUAM AM Stereo
- Branding: Kool 102

Programming
- Format: Classic hits

Ownership
- Owner: G. O. Radio, Ltd.
- Sister stations: KSIB-FM

History
- First air date: 1946

Technical information
- Licensing authority: FCC
- Facility ID: 22964
- Class: D
- Power: 1,000 watts (daytime only)
- Transmitter coordinates: 41°02′16″N 94°23′38″W
- Translator: 102.1 K271CT (Creston)

Links
- Public license information: Public file; LMS
- Webcast: Listen Live
- Website: ksibradio.com

KSIB (1520 AM) is a commercial radio station serving the Creston, Iowa area. The station primarily broadcasts a classic hits music format. KSIB is licensed to G. O. Radio, Ltd which is owned by David and Kathy Rieck.

KSIB is authorized to broadcast only during daytime hours. The antenna system consists of a single 220 ft (67 m) tower located southeast of Creston on the Pine Valley Golf Course.
