= KNSM =

Coordinates: 43.157°N 93.137°W

- Mason City, Iowa; United States
- Frequency: 91.5 MHz

Programming
- Format: News, Adult album alternative
- Affiliations: Iowa Public Radio; NPR; American Public Media

Ownership
- Owner: Iowa Public Radio, Inc.

History
- First air date: July 1, 1986
- Former call signs: KRNI (1986); KUNY (1986–2012)

Technical information
- Licensing authority: FCC
- Facility ID: 69284
- Class: C3
- ERP: 8,000 watts
- HAAT: 113 meters (371 ft)

Links
- Public license information: Public file; LMS
- Webcast: Listen live
- Website: Iowa Public Radio

KNSM (91.5 FM) is a radio station licensed to Mason City, Iowa. The station is owned by Iowa Public Radio, Inc., and carries the network's "News and Information" and "Studio One" services.

- See also Iowa Public Radio
