= Iowa Public Radio =

US state radio network

- Type: Public radio network
- Country: United States

Programming
- Affiliations: National Public Radio; Public Radio Exchange; American Public Media; Public Radio International

Coverage
- Availability: Iowa, parts of Illinois, Minnesota and Nebraska

Links
- Website: iowapublicradio.org

Iowa Public Radio (IPR) is a public radio network in the U.S. state of Iowa that combines the operations of most National Public Radio member stations in the state. Its three program streams air programming from NPR, Public Radio Exchange and American Public Media, along with local content (notably music) on weekends and evenings.

The network is headquartered on Grand Avenue in Des Moines, with studios inside the Communications Building on the Iowa State University campus on WOI Road in Ames, inside the Clinton Street Building on the University of Iowa campus on South Clinton Street in Iowa City and inside the Communication Arts Center on the University of Northern Iowa campus on West 27th Street in Cedar Falls.

== History ==
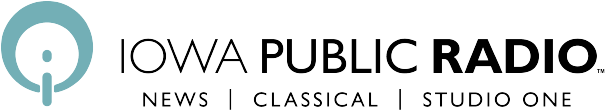
Previous logo

For many years, Iowa's three state universities each operated their own set of radio stations, each with slightly different program offerings and coverage areas. Two of them, Iowa State's WOI and the University of Iowa's WSUI, are among the oldest radio stations in the world. The three universities competed somewhat as each station sought to expand its coverage area. In late 2004, the Iowa Board of Regents, which governs the three universities, voted to merge the universities' radio stations in order to consolidate operations. The first network to launch was a "News and Information" service in January 2007, followed by a Classical service in September 2007. Nighttime adult alternative music programming that had already aired on several stations, such as "Night Music" and KUNI's "Live from Studio One", was expanded into a third full service called "Studio One". This matches the network structures maintained by Minnesota Public Radio and Wisconsin Public Radio, which also separate their stations into different networks.

Iowa Public Radio includes WOI AM-FM at ISU, WSUI and KSUI at the University of Iowa, and KUNI and KHKE at UNI. The operations have combined revenues of about $7 million annually and about 60 employees.

Since IPR came into existence decades after FM became popular, the dial was already full in most areas, limiting the potential for new stations and leading to inconsistent coverage. Some cities can receive several IPR stations, while areas of western and southern Iowa can only receive grade B coverage from one of the network's two 5,000-watt AM stations during the daytime. This has resulted in ten of IPR's fifteen fully licensed stations carrying a mix of services.

Since its debut, IPR has made it a priority to expand its services in western and southern Iowa. Pending applications for new stations would add service in western Iowa, although other organizations are also competing for those frequencies. In addition, eight construction permits have been issued for new stations, many of which will add coverage in southern Iowa. On March 21, 2008, KUNZ in Ottumwa became the IPR network's first new station to begin broadcasting. IPR has since signed on a second Ottumwa station.

In 2008, IPR shut down the individual station web sites, all of which redirect to iowapublicradio.org.

In 2000, the Iowa Board of Regents ended financing of IPR and in 2022 approved the transfer of the stations' licenses from the universities to IPR for a symbolic $1.00. The license transfer converted IPR from an educational licensee to a community licensee.

== Board of directors ==
Iowa Public Radio is governed by a board of eighteen community directors. Meetings and their committees are open to the public and are held quarterly.

== Member stations ==
Iowa Public Radio programs three different services. All three AM stations in the network carry the News Network. Affiliated FM stations carry one of two services. The News & Studio One Network programs news/talk programming from 5 a.m. to 7 p.m. and Studio One adult alternative music from 7 p.m. - 5 a.m. The Classical Network airs classical music 24 hours a day.

Location	Frequency	Call sign	Format	Notes
Ames/Des Moines	640 AM	WOI	News	
Ames/Des Moines	90.1 FM	WOI-FM	News & Studio One	
Ames	104.7 FM	K284CN	Classical	Translator of WOI-FM HD2
Carroll	90.7 FM	KNSC	News & Studio One	
Cedar Falls	89.5 FM	KHKE	Classical	
Cedar Falls	90.9 FM	KUNI	News & Studio One	
Des Moines	97.7 FM	K249EJ	Classical	Translator of WOI-FM HD2
Des Moines	94.1 FM	K231DI	Studio One	Translator of KKSO
Des Moines (Bondurant/Mitchellville)	88.9 FM	KKSO	Studio One	Serves the eastern Des Moines metro area.
Dubuque	89.7 FM	KNSY	News & Studio One	
Dubuque	101.7 FM	K269EK	Classical	Translator of KSUI
Fort Dodge	91.1 FM	KNSK	News & Studio One	
Iowa City	910 AM	WSUI	News	
Iowa City	91.7 FM	KSUI	Classical	
Iowa City	95.3 FM	K237GD	News & Studio One	Translator of KUNI
Lamoni	97.9 FM	KNSL	News & Studio One	Serves south central Iowa.
Mason City	1010 AM	KRNI	News	
Mason City	91.5 FM	KNSM	News & Studio One	
Mason City	90.7 FM	K214BA	Classical	Translator of KHKE
Ottumwa	91.1 FM	KICW	Classical	
Ottumwa	89.1 FM	KNSZ	News & Studio One	
Patterson	105.9 FM	KICP	Classical	Serves Winterset, Osceola and southwest Des Moines area.
Perry	91.7 FM	KICG	Classical	Serves Ames, Boone and northwest Des Moines area.
Pleasantville	96.3 FM	KICL	Classical	Serves Knoxville and southeast Des Moines area.
Quad Cities (Bettendorf)	91.1 FM	KNSB	News & Studio One	
Quad Cities (Davenport)	94.5 FM	K233AA	News & Studio One	Translator of KUNI
Quad Cities (Eldridge)	102.1 FM	K271AF	News & Studio One	Translator of KUNI

== New station applications ==
During a filing window for new stations in the non-commercial portion of the band (88-92 MHz) in October 2007, the Universities that make up Iowa Public Radio applied for new stations in Atlantic, Keokuk, Mason City, Rockwell City, Shenandoah, Sioux City, and Storm Lake. However, all of these applications are in competition with other groups.
