= KLGZ =

- Algona, Iowa; United States
- Frequency: 1600 kHz
- Branding: Home Country FM 98.5 - AM 1600

Programming
- Format: Country
- Affiliations: ABC News Radio

Ownership
- Owner: Bernadette Merrill; (A2Z Broadcasting, LLC)
- Sister stations: KLGA-FM

History
- First air date: 1956
- Former call signs: KLGA (1956–2014)
- Call sign meaning: "Algona"

Technical information
- Licensing authority: FCC
- Facility ID: 35429
- Class: B
- Power: 1,000 watts day 500 watts night
- Transmitter coordinates: 43°04′05″N 94°18′16″W
- Translator: 98.5 K253BJ (Algona)

Links
- Public license information: Public file; LMS
- Webcast: Listen Live
- Website: algonaradio.com

KLGZ (1600 AM) is a radio station broadcasting a country music format. Licensed to serve Algona, Iowa, United States, the station is owned by Bernadette Merrill, through licensee A2Z Broadcasting, LLC, and features programming from ABC News Radio. Prior to country music, KLGZ had an adult contemporary format, simulcasting its sister station, KLGA-FM. KLGZ began broadcasting in 1956 as KLGA, a daytime-only station, and added nighttime power at a later date.

KLGA changed its call sign to the current KLGZ on July 15, 2014.

== FM translator ==
KLGZ relays programming to an FM translator in order to widen the coverage area and also to provide listeners with the stereophonic high fidelity sound of FM. KLGZ uses a two tower antenna array which orients the signal to the northwest; the FM translator uses a non-directional pattern.

Broadcast translator for KLGZ
Call sign	Frequency	City of license	FID	ERP (W)	Class	FCC info
K253BJ	98.5 FM	Algona, Iowa	147897	250	D	LMS
