= KIFG-FM =

- Iowa Falls, Iowa; United States
- Frequency: 95.3 MHz
- Branding: Iowa River Radio

Programming
- Format: Classic hits

Ownership
- Owner: Times-Citizen Communications, Inc.
- Sister stations: KIFG (AM)

History
- First air date: October 1, 1965

Technical information
- Licensing authority: FCC
- Facility ID: 52020
- Class: A
- ERP: 6,000 watts
- HAAT: 59 m (194 ft)
- Transmitter coordinates: 42°30′49″N 93°12′57″W

Links
- Public license information: Public file; LMS
- Website: KIFG-FM Online

KIFG-FM (95.3 FM) is a commercial radio station serving the Iowa Falls, Iowa area. The station primarily broadcasts a classic hits format. KIFG-FM is licensed to Times-Citizen Communications, Inc which is owned by Mark H. Hamilton, Carie Goodknight and Josh Lovelace.

The transmitter and broadcast tower are located 2 miles east of Iowa Falls along 130th Street. According to the Antenna Structure Registration database, the tower is 71 m (233 ft) tall with the FM broadcast antenna mounted at the 66 m (217 ft) level. The calculated Height Above Average Terrain is 59 m (194 ft). The tower is shared with its AM sister station KIFG (AM).

The station is an affiliate of the syndicated Pink Floyd program "Floydian Slip."

== History ==
On June 30, 2010, KIFG-FM changed their format from adult contemporary to classic hits.
