= KXLQ =

- Indianola, Iowa; United States
- Broadcast area: Des Moines, Iowa
- Frequency: 1490 kHz
- Branding: La Q Buena

Programming
- Format: Regional Mexican

Ownership
- Owner: Birach Broadcasting; (Birach Broadcasting)

History
- First air date: 1963 (as KBAB)
- Former call signs: KBAB (1963–1984)

Technical information
- Licensing authority: FCC
- Facility ID: 70891
- Class: C
- Power: 500 watts day 1,000 watts night
- Transmitter coordinates: 41°21′24″N 93°35′16″W
- Translator: 95.7 K239CR (Indianola)

Links
- Public license information: Public file; LMS
- Website: laqbuena.com

KXLQ (1490 AM) is a radio station licensed to serve Indianola, Iowa. The station is owned by Birach Broadcasting. The station had been silent; however, it returned to the air on April 21, 2010. As of January 18, 2013, it was carrying a sports format, featuring programming from SB Nation Radio and ESPN Radio.

Former logo

KXLQ has historically operated with a variety of sports and ethnic programming formats. After a period of being silent, the station returned to the air on April 21, 2010. By early 2013, it had adopted a sports talk format, carrying programming from ESPN Radio, SB Nation Radio, and Yahoo! Sports Radio. During this period, it also simulcast local programming from station KBGG. The station served as a regional affiliate for several major sports teams, including the New York Yankees, Chicago Bears, Notre Dame Fighting Irish, and the Nebraska Cornhuskers. In June 2018, the station rebranded as "La Q Buena," shifting its focus to a Regional Mexican music format to serve the Des Moines metropolitan area.

== History and ownership ==
The station first began broadcasting in 1963 under the call sign KBAB. It was assigned its current KXLQ call letters by the Federal Communications Commission (FCC) on June 8, 1984.

In July 2004, KXLQ Insight Sports LLC, which had been operating the station under a time brokerage agreement since March 26, 2004, made an agreement to buy the station from Warren Broadcasting for $360,000. This deal ultimately collapsed and the station was put back on the market.

In September 2005, Davidson Media Group (Peter Davidson, president) reached an agreement to buy KXLQ from Warren Broadcasting Inc. (Dwaine F. Meyer, president) for a reported sale of $425,000.

In March 2007, Birach Broadcasting Corporation, headed by President Sima Birach, reached an agreement to acquire KXLQ from Davidson Media Group as part of a two-station deal worth a reported $800,000.

In 2012, it began broadcasting Yahoo! Sports Radio and simulcasting local host Mary Tirrell's program from KBGG. In early 2013, it added ESPN Radio programming. It also serves as an affiliate for the New York Yankees, Chicago Bears, and Notre Dame Fighting Irish football and Nebraska Cornhuskers football.

On January 8, 2016, Radio Insight reported that 62 And Even II is acquiring KXLQ from Birach Broadcasting for $300,000. The buyers are made up of the owners and management team of Iowa-based construction company The Rasmussen Group. However, FCC reports indicated that the sale was never consummated and Birach Broadcasting remains the owner.
