= KWBG =

Radio station in Boone, Iowa

- Boone, Iowa; United States
- Broadcast area: Boone County; Story County
- Frequency: 1590 kHz
- Branding: KWBG AM 1590

Programming
- Format: Talk and sports
- Affiliations: ABC News Radio; Fox Sports Radio; Premiere Networks; USA Radio Network; Chicago Cubs Radio Network; Iowa State Cyclones Radio Network

Ownership
- Owner: Fieldview Broadcasting, LLC

History
- First air date: January 15, 1950
- Call sign meaning: Keep Watching Boone Grow

Technical information
- Licensing authority: FCC
- Facility ID: 22978
- Class: B
- Power: 1,000 watts (day); 500 watts (night)
- Transmitter coordinates: 42°1′21.94″N 93°52′36.82″W
- Translator: 101.5 K268DS (Boone)

Links
- Public license information: Public file; LMS
- Webcast: Listen live
- Website: www.kwbg.com

KWBG (1590 AM) is a talk and sports-formatted broadcast radio station. The station is licensed to Boone, Iowa, and serves Boone and Story Counties in Iowa. KWBG is owned and operated by Fieldview Broadcasting, LLC.

== History ==
The station began broadcasting January 15, 1950, and ran 1,000 watts, during daytime hours only. It was originally owned by Boone Broadcasting Co. The following year, the station began nighttime operations, running 500 watts, utilizing a directional array. In the early 1970s, the station was sold to E. G. Wenrick and Kenneth Kilmer. In 1980, KWBG and its sister station KWBG-FM were sold to a group headed by general manager Dennis Borwick for $508,476. In 1986, KWBG and its FM sister station were sold to KZBA, Inc. for $606,344. In 1989, the station was sold to G.O. Radio, Inc. for $400,000.

In 1993, the station's format was changed from adult contemporary to country music. By the late 1990s, the station was airing a farm news-talk format. In 1999, the station was sold to Waitt Radio. Fieldview Broadcasting took ownership of KWBG in 2018. In 2019, KWBG received the National Association of Broadcasters' Crystal Award.
