= KDAO-FM =

- Eldora, Iowa; United States
- Frequency: 92.9 MHz
- Branding: "Rewind 93"

Programming
- Format: 1990s hits
- Affiliations: Fox News Radio

Ownership
- Owner: Eldora Broadcasting Company, Inc
- Operator: OnTheGoMedia (via LMA)
- Sister stations: KDAO (AM), KDIT-CD

History
- First air date: June 1, 1992

Technical information
- Licensing authority: FCC
- Facility ID: 19202
- Class: A
- ERP: 6,000 watts
- HAAT: 100 m (328 ft)
- Transmitter coordinates: 42°15′49″N 93°03′57″W

Links
- Public license information: Public file; LMS
- Website: KDAO-FM Online

KDAO-FM (92.9 FM, "Rewind 93") is a commercial radio station that serves the Marshalltown, Iowa and Eldora, Iowa area. The station primarily broadcasts a 1990s hits format. KDAO-FM is licensed to Eldora Broadcasting Company, Inc which is owned by Dean L. Osmundson, Audrey G. Osmundson and Mark K. Osmundson. The Osmundsons also own MTN Broadcasting, Inc., licensee of KDAO-AM and KDIT-CD, Marshalltown, IA.

The station also provides local news, weather and sports as well as national and worldwide news via its Fox News affiliation.

The transmitter and broadcast tower are located between Eldora and Marshalltown north of Union, Iowa. According to the Antenna Structure Registration database, the tower is 120 m (394 ft) tall with the FM broadcast antenna mounted at the 116 m (381 ft) level. The calculated height above average terrain is 100 m (328 ft).

On September 11, 2024, the station switched frequencies from 99.5 FM to 92.9 FM. This move allowed the station to upgrade from 3,000 watts to 6,000 watts of power.

On September 30, 2024 the station applied for a power increase from its current facilities of 100m at 6,000 watts to 100m 13,500 watts of power. This would make the station a C3 class signal if ultimately approved and constructed.

On July 8, 2026, after OnTheGoMedia began a local marketing agreement with Eldora Broadcasting Company, Inc to operate the station, KDAO-FM changed its format from adult contemporary to 1990s hits, branded as "Rewind 93".
