= KSOU (AM) =

- Sioux Center, Iowa; United States
- Frequency: 1090 kHz
- Branding: Sioux Ritmo

Programming
- Format: Spanish Adult hits
- Affiliations: Fox News Radio

Ownership
- Owner: Community First Broadcasting.
- Sister stations: KIHK, KSOU-FM

History
- First air date: 1969
- Call sign meaning: "Sioux"

Technical information
- Licensing authority: FCC
- Facility ID: 67756
- Class: D
- Power: 500 watts (day only)
- Transmitter coordinates: 43°3′22″N 96°10′17″W
- Translator: 101.5 K268CZ (Sioux Center)

Links
- Public license information: Public file; LMS
- Website: siouxcountyradio.com

KSOU (1090 kHz) is an AM radio station broadcasting a Spanish adult hits format. Serving the Sioux Center area in the U.S. state of Iowa, the station is licensed to Community First Broadcasting. KSOU previously carried a classic hits format and before that, a Christian Contemporary format.

1090 AM is a United States and Mexican clear-channel frequency; KSOU must leave the air from sunset to sunrise to prevent interference to the skywave signals of the Class A stations.

On February 5, 2020, KSOU changed their format from classic hits to Spanish adult hits, branded as "Sioux Ritmo".
