= KSIB-FM =

- Creston, Iowa; United States
- Frequency: 101.3 MHz

Programming
- Format: Country
- Affiliations: ABC News Radio

Ownership
- Owner: G. O. Radio, Ltd.
- Sister stations: KSIB (AM)

History
- First air date: March 1966

Technical information
- Licensing authority: FCC
- Facility ID: 22965
- Class: C3
- ERP: 19,000 watts
- HAAT: 111 meters
- Transmitter coordinates: 41°05′41″N 94°22′30″W

Links
- Public license information: Public file; LMS
- Webcast: Listen Live
- Website: ksibradio.com

KSIB-FM (101.3 MHz) is a radio station located in Creston, Iowa that serves an eight-county area in southwest Iowa. It has been a country format station for most of its broadcast history. The station changed to talk format for six months in 2014 before returning to the country music format. KSIB also broadcasts local news, weather and sports. Local baseball, basketball and football games are broadcast live.

== Broadcast Area ==
KSIB-FM reaches as far north as West Des Moines, and south of the Missouri-Iowa border. KSIB's prime broadcast area includes these 8 counties in Iowa: Adair, Adams, Clarke, Decatur, Madison, Ringgold, Taylor, and Union. News and sports are primarily covered from the counties of Adair, Adams, Ringgold and Union counties.

== Programming ==
KSIB was founded in 1946 and has maintained the country format since its beginning, except for six months beginning on March 31, 2014, when the format changed to talk. From 6 AM to 1 PM weekdays, the programming was predominantly local. The only exception was the nationally syndicated AgriTalk program from 10 to 11 AM. After 1 PM, The Dennis Miller Show, Herman Cain and others were broadcast until 6 AM the next day.

KSIB dropped its talk radio format after six months, on October 10, 2014. When it returned to the country music format, the station selected music from a wider range of artists and broadcast music from the last several decades as well as the newest releases in the genre. Also different from before, the music DJs are all local. Country begins at 1 PM every weekday with Melinda Mackey, also the host of KSIB's Grapevine show. Ben Walter, host of the KSIB Morning Show, is on after - from 6 PM to midnight.

The KSIB Morning Show has Ben Walter, KSIB News Director and Melinda Mackey. Other local programs on KSIB include Trading Post (buy/sell/trade) Monday through Friday, Grapevine w/Melinda Mackey (local interest talk) airing every Thursday, Radio Ranch w/Chad Rieck (agriculture talk) and AgriNews which is carried at 10 AM each weekday.

== Personalities ==
Ben Walter started part-time at the station in 1987. He hosts the KSIB Morning show every weekday morning - includes funeral announcements, birthdays/anniversaries, trivia, newscasts, weather, and sports. Melinda Mackey has been with KSIB for nearly 15 years - hosting the Grapevine program, Job Search, and more.
