= KXIA =

Radio station in Marshalltown, Iowa

- Marshalltown, Iowa; United States
- Broadcast area: Des Moines
- Frequency: 101.1 MHz
- Branding: KIX 101.1

Programming
- Format: Country

Ownership
- Owner: Robert and Colleen Holtan; (Trending Media, Inc.)

History
- First air date: January 1968
- Former call signs: KFJB-FM (1968–1986); KMTG-FM (1986–1987)

Technical information
- Licensing authority: FCC
- Facility ID: 40464
- Class: C1
- ERP: 100,000 watts
- HAAT: 200 meters (660 ft)
- Transmitter coordinates: 42°00′19.6″N 92°55′45.8″W

Links
- Public license information: Public file; LMS
- Webcast: Listen live
- Website: http://www.kixweb.com/

KXIA (101.1 MHz) is a commercial FM radio station broadcasting a Country radio format. It is licensed to Marshalltown, Iowa, and serves the Des Moines metropolitan area. The station is currently licensed to Trending Media, Inc.

KXIA is powered at 100,000 watts, the maximum for non-grandfathered FM radio stations in the U.S. The transmitter is located near U.S. Route 30 and South 12th Street in Marshalltown.

== History ==
The station first signed on in January 1968 as KFJB-FM. It was simulcast with co-owned KFJB (1230 AM). The two stations were owned by the Marshall Electric Company. KFJB-FM was powered at only 27,500 watts, a quarter of its current effective radiated power (ERP).
