= KICL =

Iowa Public Radio station in Pleasantville–Des Moines, Iowa

- Pleasantville, Iowa; United States
- Broadcast area: Des Moines, Iowa
- Frequency: 96.3 MHz
- Branding: IPR Classical

Programming
- Format: Classical music
- Affiliations: Iowa Public Radio

Ownership
- Owner: Iowa Public Radio, Inc.

History
- First air date: 2007 (as KZWU)
- Former call signs: KZWU (2007–2011); KZHC (3/2011–11/2011)

Technical information
- Licensing authority: FCC
- Facility ID: 164103
- Class: A
- ERP: 6,000 watts
- HAAT: 77.7 meters (255 ft)
- Transmitter coordinates: 41°19′57.9″N 93°05′11.1″W

Links
- Public license information: Public file; LMS
- Webcast: Listen live
- Website: Iowa Public Radio

KICL (96.3 FM) is an American radio station licensed to Pleasantville, Iowa, United States. The station serves the Des Moines area. A sale of KICP and sister station KICL to Iowa State University was completed in early November 2011. Both stations went silent upon completion of the sale, but returned to the air on November 21, 2011, airing Iowa Public Radio's Classical Network.

The station has obtained a construction permit from the FCC for a power increase to 6,000 watts.

On August 5, 2011, Connoisseur announced the sale of both KZHZ (now KICP) and KZHC (now KICL) to Iowa Public Radio, which announced plans to convert the two stations into non-commercial outlets. The sale closed on October 31, 2011. The stations are planned to broadcast a 24-hour-a-day classical music format.

On November 1, 2011, KZHC changed its call sign to KICL.
