= KCHE (AM) =

- Cherokee, Iowa; United States
- Frequency: 1440 kHz
- Branding: AM 1440 KCHE

Programming
- Format: Adult standards
- Affiliations: USA Radio News

Ownership
- Owner: Simon Fuller; (Better Broadcasting Incorporated)

History
- First air date: January 1953
- Call sign meaning: CHErokee

Technical information
- Licensing authority: FCC
- Facility ID: 60494
- Class: D
- Power: 390 watts day 29 watts night
- Transmitter coordinates: 42°47′21″N 95°33′08″W

Links
- Public license information: Public file; LMS
- Website: kcheradio.com

KCHE (1440 AM) is a commercial radio station licensed to serve the community of Cherokee, Iowa. The station primarily broadcasts an adult standards format. KCHE is owned by Simon Fuller, through licensee Better Broadcasting Incorporated. It was first licensed on March 10, 1953.

Former owners include Sioux Valley Broadcasting Company, Inc, Cherokee Broadcasting Company, and J & J Broadcasting Corporation.
