= KCSI (FM) =

Radio station in Red Oak, Iowa

- Red Oak, Iowa; United States
- Broadcast area: Southeast Nebraska and Southwest Iowa
- Frequency: 95.3 MHz
- Branding: KCSI/KOAK Country Sunshine

Programming
- Format: Country music
- Affiliations: Fox News Radio

Ownership
- Owner: Hawkeye Communications, Inc.
- Sister stations: KOAK-AM (satellite of KCSI)

History
- Call sign meaning: Country SunshIne

Technical information
- Licensing authority: FCC
- Facility ID: 26456
- Class: C3
- ERP: 50,000 watts
- HAAT: 105.0 meters
- Transmitter coordinates: 41°01′35.3″N 95°12′03.0″W

Links
- Public license information: Public file; LMS
- Webcast: live stream
- Website: kcsifm.com

KCSI (95.3 FM) is a radio station broadcasting a country music format. Located in Red Oak, Iowa, United States, the station serves the Council Bluffs, Iowa area. The station is licensed to Hawkeye Communications, Inc. and features programming from Fox News Radio .
