= WOI (AM) =

Public radio station in Ames, Iowa

- Ames, Iowa; United States
- Broadcast area: Des Moines metropolitan area
- Frequency: 640 kHz
- Branding: Iowa Public Radio

Programming
- Format: Public radio; news-talk
- Network: Iowa Public Radio
- Affiliations: National Public Radio; Public Radio Exchange; BBC World Service

Ownership
- Owner: Iowa Public Radio, Inc.
- Sister stations: WOI-FM

History
- First air date: April 28, 1922

Technical information
- Licensing authority: FCC
- Facility ID: 29119
- Class: B
- Power: 5,000 watts day; 1,000 watts night
- Transmitter coordinates: 41°59′34″N 93°41′27.8″W
- Translator: 104.7 K284CN (Ames)

Links
- Public license information: Public file; LMS
- Webcast: Listen live
- Website: iowapublicradio.org

WOI (640 kHz) is a non-commercial AM radio station licensed to Ames, Iowa, and serving the Des Moines metropolitan area. Owned by Iowa Public Radio, it is a listener-supported public radio station airing a news and talk format. WOI is the flagship station for Iowa Public Radio's News Network, affiliated with NPR, Public Radio Exchange and the BBC World Service. Its transmitter is located at a two-tower array off Zumwalt Station Road near Y Avenue, southwest of Ames.

By day, WOI is powered at 5,000 watts using a single non-directional antenna. Due to its low transmitting frequency and Iowa's flat land (with near-perfect ground conductivity), its daytime footprint is equivalent to that of a full-power FM station, providing at least secondary coverage to almost all of Iowa-as far east as Cedar Rapids and as far west as Sioux City. Its secondary signal also covers portions of Minnesota, Nebraska, Missouri, and South Dakota. Its daytime coverage area is similar to that of central Iowa's most powerful AM station, 50,000-watt WHO. As 640 AM is a clear channel frequency reserved for Class A station KFI in Los Angeles, WOI reduces power at night to 1,000 watts, with power fed to both towers in a directional pattern that pushes the signal to the east, concentrating it in the Des Moines and Ames areas. Programming is also heard on 250-watt FM translator K284CN at 104.7 MHz.

Historically, WOI is one of the oldest radio stations in the United States, having begun experimental transmissions in 1911.

== History ==
=== Historical broadcasts ===
The history of WOI can be traced back to 1911. "Dad" Hoffman, a physics professor at Iowa State College–forerunner of Iowa State University (ISU), installed a transmission line between the Campus Water Tower and the Engineering Building and set up a wireless telegraph station. By 1913, this was known as experimental station 9YI and it was sending and receiving weather reports by Morse code on a regular basis.

The first sound broadcast was an hour of concert music on November 21, 1921. The Commerce Department issued a full radio license to WOI in April 1922. The first regular broadcast took place on April 28, 1922. The original call sign 9YI is now W0YI and is retained by the ISU Campus Radio Club, with the amateur radio station in the Electrical Engineering building.

WOI may be the oldest fully licensed non-commercial station west of the Mississippi River. Sister station WSUI, founded by the University of Iowa in Iowa City, also began telegraph transmissions in 1911 and also has claims to being the earliest educational station west of the Mississippi. Other Midwestern universities also started stations in the 1910s: the University of Minnesota's KUOM in 1912, St. Louis University's WEW also in 1912, and the University of Wisconsin's WHA in 1915.

=== Farm reports and sports ===
The first regular programming on WOI was farm market reports gathered by ticker tape and Morse code, broadcast throughout the state. Another early staple was sporting events by Iowa State's athletic teams. In 1925, "The Music Shop" aired for the first time. One of the longest-running programs in the history of radio, it moved to WOI-FM in the 1970s before going off the air in 2006. In 1927, another longtime favorite, "The Book Club" was added; it also aired until 2006.

On December 1, 1949, Iowa State launched an FM sister station, WOI-FM at 90.1 MHz. WOI-TV was subsequently launched in 1950 as the first television station in central Iowa. It was also the first commercial TV station owned by an educational institution. It was affiliated with all four networks at the time: CBS, NBC, ABC and the DuMont Network. WOI-TV became solely an ABC affiliate in 1955. The television station was sold by the Iowa Board of Regents on March 1, 1994; it is now owned by Tegna.

=== NPR affiliate ===
WOI-AM-FM became a charter member of National Public Radio (NPR) when it began its regular schedule of afternoon news program All Things Considered in 1971.

Today WOI's programming consists of both NPR and locally produced talk shows along with local news reports and BBC news updates. The classical music of the early years migrated exclusively to WOI-FM in the 1960s. When the radio services of Iowa's state universities were merged into Iowa Public Radio in 2004, WOI became the flagship of IPR's Operations and IT services.

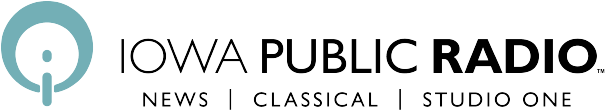
Previous logo

== FM translator ==
Broadcast translator for WOI
Call sign	Frequency	City of license	FID	ERP (W)	HAAT	Class	Transmitter coordinates	FCC info
K284CN	104.7 FM	Ames, Iowa	144461	250	0 m (0 ft)	D	42°1′53.1″N 93°39′4″W	LMS

== See also ==
- List of initial AM-band station grants in the United States
- List of three-letter broadcast call signs in the United States
