= KFMG-LP =

Radio station in Des Moines, Iowa

- Des Moines, Iowa; United States
- Broadcast area: Des Moines, Iowa
- Frequency: 98.9 MHz

Programming
- Format: adult album alternative

Ownership
- Owner: The Des Moines Community Radio Foundation

History
- First air date: February 26, 2007
- Former frequencies: 99.1 MHz (2007–2015)
- Call sign meaning: reference to the former KFMG-FM

Technical information
- Licensing authority: FCC
- Facility ID: 134908
- Class: L1
- ERP: 95 watts
- HAAT: 27 meters (89 ft)
- Transmitter coordinates: 41°35′04″N 93°37′46″W

Links
- Public license information: LMS
- Webcast: Listen Live
- Website: kfmg.org

KFMG-LP (98.9 FM) is a radio station licensed to Des Moines, Iowa. The station is owned by the Des Moines Community Radio Foundation. The noncommercial low-power station currently airs a primarily wide-ranging adult album alternative format with a strong local community focus.

The KFMG call sign has been used on two other stations. From 1964 to 1975, the KFMG call sign was allocated to 94.9 FM, and the station at one time aired a free-form rock format programmed by Ron Sorenson. Sorenson later owned the 103.3 FM frequency, which had the KFMG call sign and a similar format from 1992 until 1996, when Sorenson sold it to Saga Communications and the format was flipped to active rock. Sorenson is general manager of KFMG-LP.

KFMG-LP signed on the air on February 26, 2007. The station went off the air on January 15, 2010, with the board of previous licensee Employee & Family Resources (Hoyt Sherman Place Foundation) citing financial reasons. In March, the group donated the station to the Des Moines Community Radio Foundation, which consists partly of station staffers. The group returned the station to the air on June 14.

== Original Shows ==
=== The Culture Buzz ===
A two-hour weekly talk show that airs on Wednesdays from 11AM to 1PM CST and focuses on arts, culture, history, literature in the state of Iowa. John Busbee is the show's host.

=== Dirt Road Radio ===
Airs Monday nights from 6PM to 7PM CST. A one-hour weekly music show that focuses on Americana, adult indie rock, and Iowa artists. Brian Joens is the host.

=== Iowa Basement Tapes ===
A one-hour weekly music show that airs on Thursdays from 9PM to 10PM and focuses on Iowa's history in punk rock, garage, metal, and electronic. Kristian Day is the show's host and was first broadcast on July 5, 2018. It was KFMG's first original program to be syndicated on other radio stations as well as archived in a podcast format.

=== The Morning Show ===
Airs Monday through Friday from 6AM to 12PM CST. Music show focusing on adult contemporary. Hosted by Gary Monte.

=== The Preston Daniels Show ===
Airs Mondays from 12PM to 2PM CST. Music show focusing on jazz, soul, and rock and roll. Hosted by Preston Daniels.

=== The Ron Sorenson Show ===
Airs Monday through Friday from 3PM to 6PM CST. Music show that focuses on progressive rock and roll. Hosted by Ron Sorenson.
