= WOI-FM =

Iowa Public Radio flagship station in Ames, Iowa, United States

- Ames, Iowa; United States
- Broadcast area: Des Moines, Iowa; Central Iowa
- Frequency: 90.1 MHz (HD Radio)
- Branding: IPR News and Studio One

Programming
- Format: News; adult alternative
- Subchannels: HD2: KSUI simulcast (classical music)
- Network: Iowa Public Radio
- Affiliations: NPR; American Public Media

Ownership
- Owner: Iowa Public Radio, Inc.
- Sister stations: WOI (AM)

History
- First air date: December 1, 1949
- Call sign meaning: from sister station WOI

Technical information
- Licensing authority: FCC
- Facility ID: 29118
- Class: C
- ERP: 100,000 watts
- HAAT: 454 meters (1,490 ft)
- Transmitter coordinates: 41°48′32.9″N 93°36′53.7″W
- Translator: HD2: 104.7 K284CN (Ames)

Links
- Public license information: Public file; LMS
- Webcast: Listen live
- Website: iowapublicradio.org

WOI-FM (90.1 FM) is a radio station licensed to Ames, Iowa, serving the greater Ames/Des Moines area. The station is owned by Iowa Public Radio (IPR). WOI-FM carries IPR's "News and Studio One" service—a mix of National Public Radio (NPR) news programming and adult alternative music.

WOI-FM first hit the airwaves on December 1, 1949. It was originally a full-time simulcast of WOI. The two stations went their separate ways in the 1960s.

Until the formation of Iowa Public Radio in 2004, WOI-FM was the flagship station for a mini-network of FM stations in central Iowa, including KWOI in Carroll and KTPR in Fort Dodge.

For most of the time since the formation of NPR, WOI-FM aired a mix of classical music and NPR news and talk programming, simulcasting many programs with its AM sister. Shortly after midnight on September 10, 2012, IPR switched WOI-FM's format to the News and Studio One service. The classical service moved to WOI-FM's second digital subcarrier. For those without HD Radio, classical music continues to be heard in portions of central Iowa on five full-power stations that between them cover most of the region.

== HD programming ==
WOI-FM broadcasts two digital channels in the HD Radio (hybrid) format.

== See also ==
- Iowa Public Radio
- List of three-letter broadcast call signs in the United States
