= Ames, Iowa =

City in Iowa, US

- City
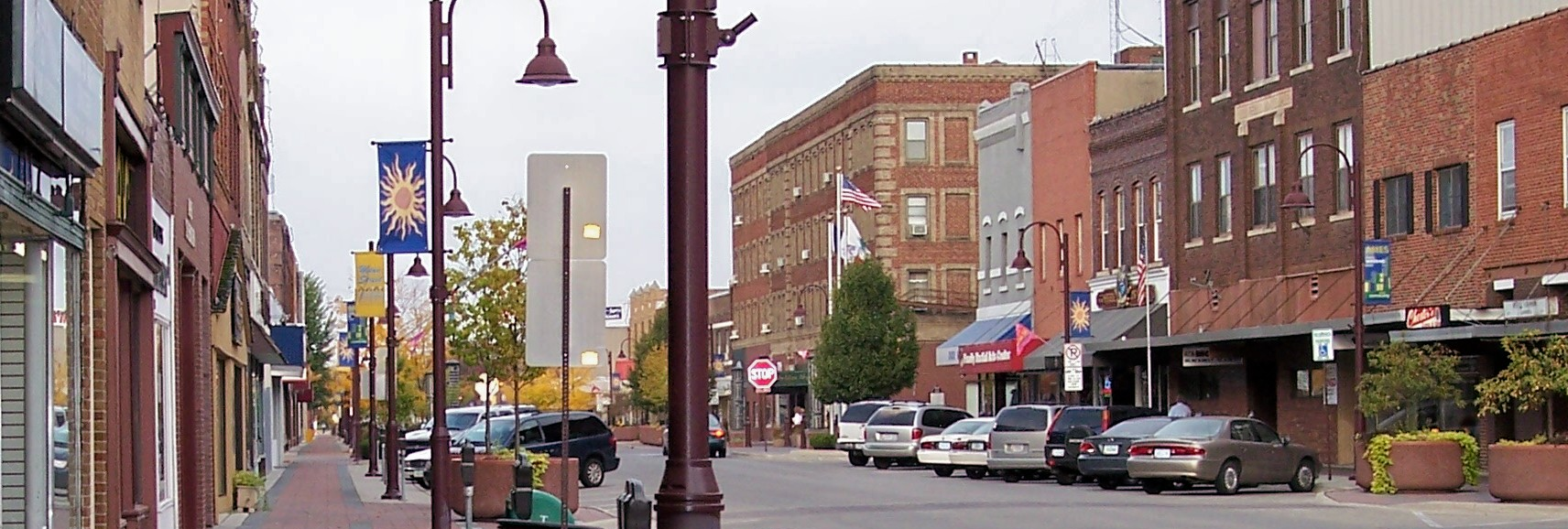
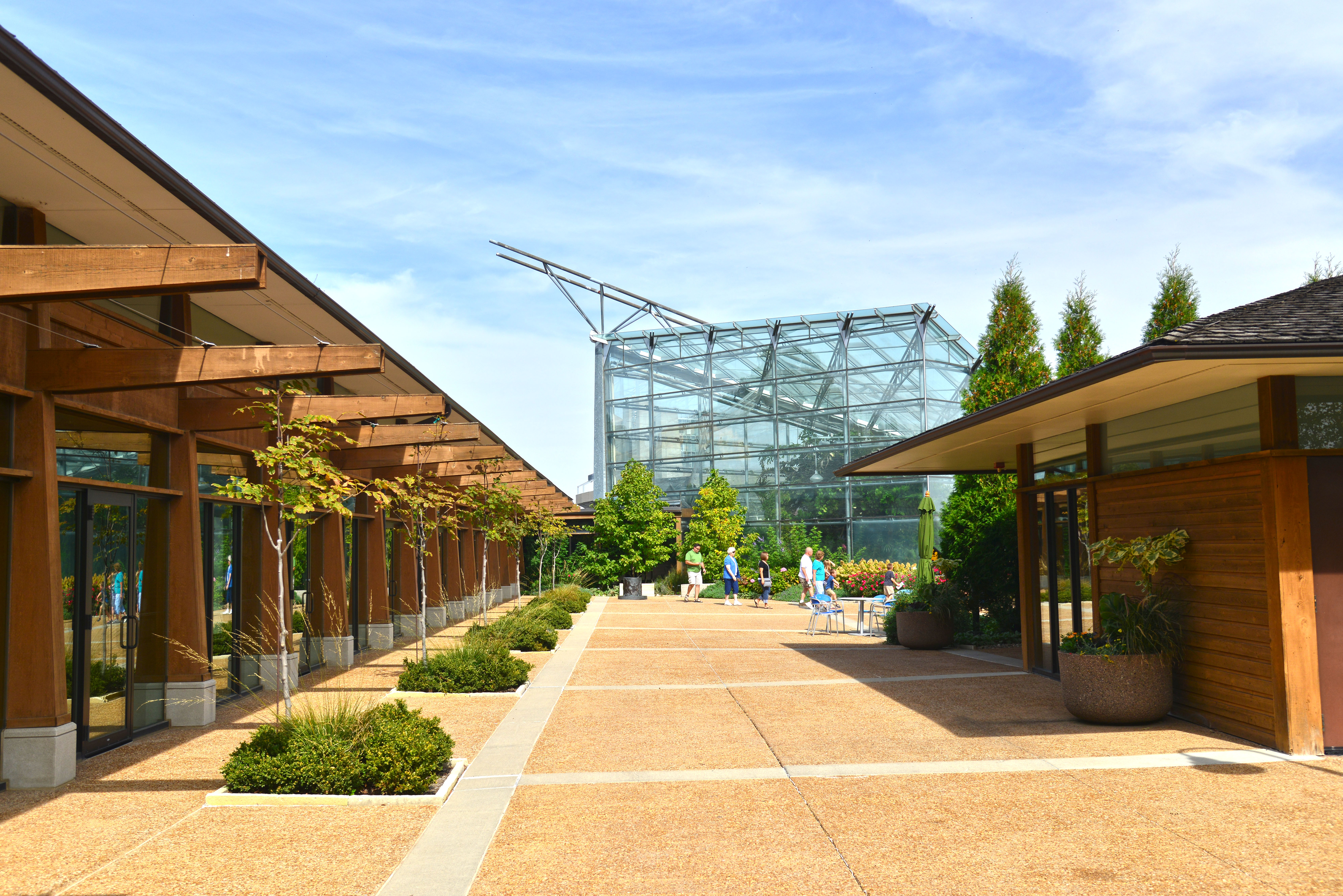
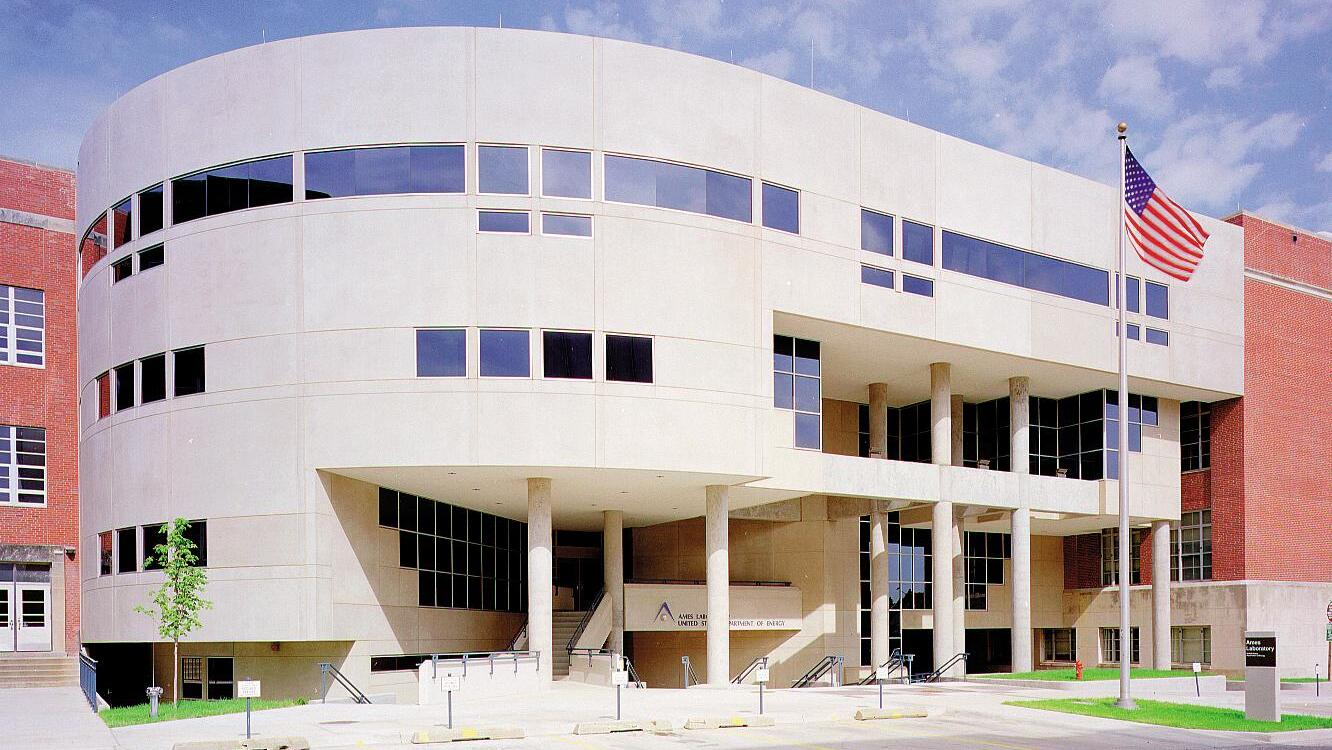
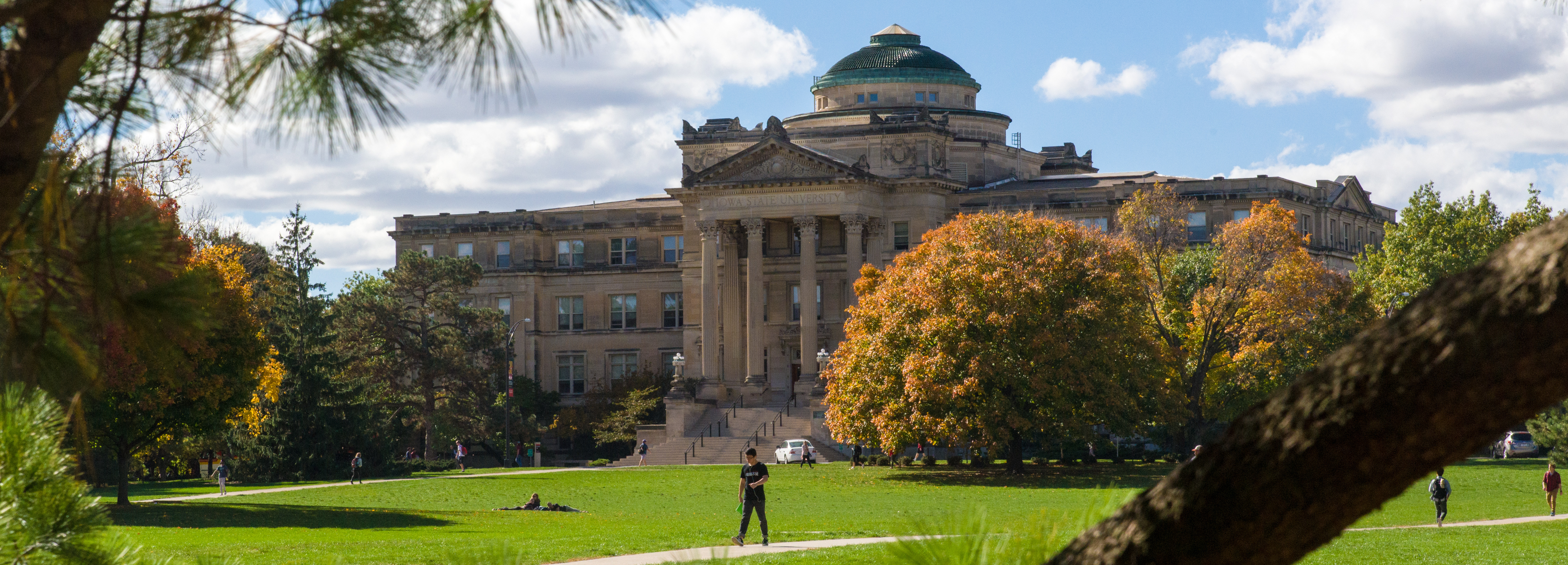
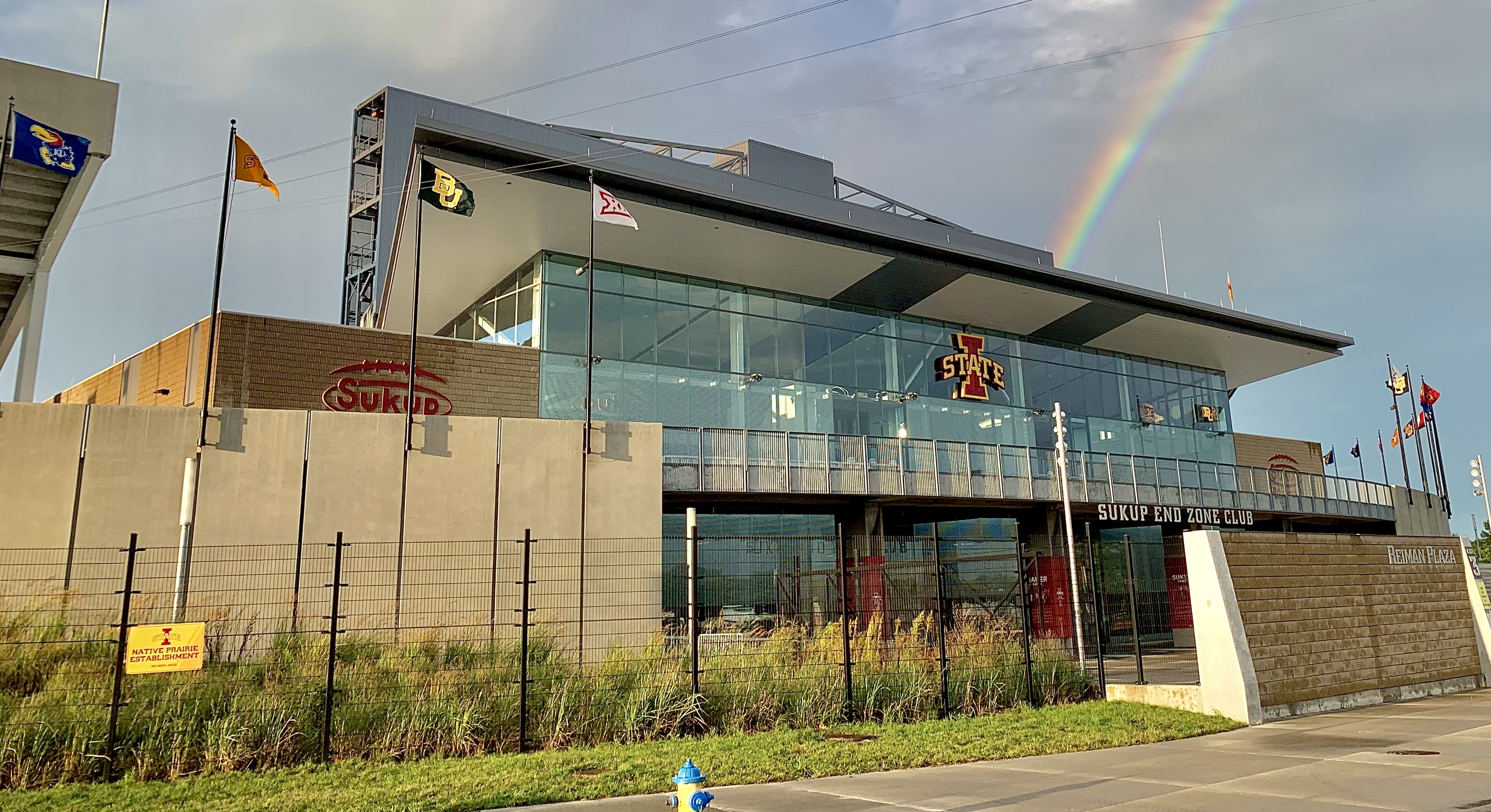
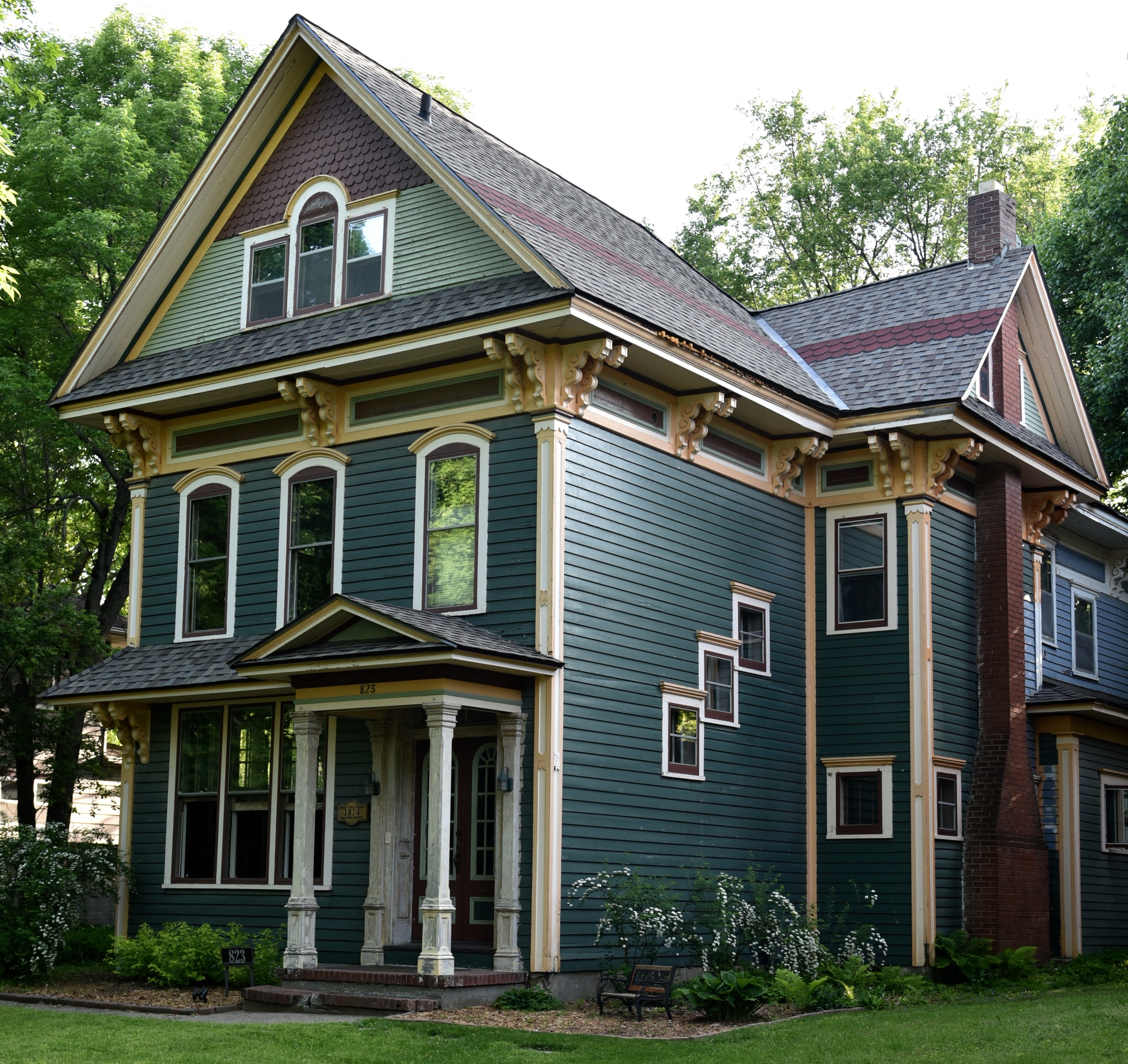
- Ames Main Street Historic District Reiman Gardens Ames National Laboratory Iowa State University and Beardshear Hall Jack Trice Stadium Old Town Historic District

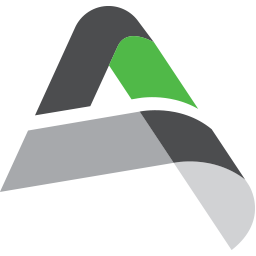
- Icon
- Motto: "Smart Choice"
- Interactive map of Ames, Iowa
- Location within Iowa Location within the United States
- Coordinates: 42°01′05″N 93°37′12″W
- Country: United States
- State: Iowa
- County: Story
- Incorporated: December 20, 1869

Area
  - City: 27.92 sq mi (72.32 km^{2})
  - Land: 27.58 sq mi (71.43 km^{2})
  - Water: 0.34 sq mi (0.89 km^{2})
- Elevation: 922 ft (281 m)

Population (2020)
  - City: 66,427
  - Rank: 9th in Iowa
  - Density: 2,408.6/sq mi (929.96/km^{2})
  - Urban: 60,438
  - Metro: 89,542 (estimate based on Story County)
- Time zone: UTC−6 (CST)
  - Summer (DST): UTC−5 (CDT)
- ZIP code(s): 50010, 50011-50013 (Unique ZIP Codes for Iowa State University), 50014
- FIPS code: 19-01855
- GNIS feature ID: 2393947
- Website: www.cityofames.org

Ames (/eɪmz/) is a city in Story County, Iowa, United States, located approximately 30 miles (48 km) north of Des Moines in central Iowa. It is the home of Iowa State University (ISU). According to the 2020 census, Ames had a population of 66,427, making it the state's ninth-most populous city. Iowa State University was home to 30,177 students as of fall 2023, which make up approximately one half of the city's population.

A United States Department of Energy national laboratory, Ames National Laboratory, is located on the ISU campus. Ames also hosts United States Department of Agriculture (USDA) sites: the largest federal animal disease center in the United States, the USDA Agricultural Research Service's National Animal Disease Center (NADC), as well as one of two national USDA sites for the Animal and Plant Health Inspection Service (APHIS), which comprises the National Veterinary Services Laboratory and the Center for Veterinary Biologics. Ames also hosts the headquarters of the Iowa Department of Transportation.

== History ==
The city was founded in 1864 as a station stop on the Cedar Rapids and Missouri Railroad and was named after 19th century U.S. Congressman Oakes Ames of Massachusetts, who was influential in the building of the transcontinental railroad. Ames was founded by local resident Cynthia Olive Duff (née Kellogg) and railroad magnate John Insley Blair, near a location that was deemed favorable for a railroad crossing of the Skunk River and Ioway Creek.

William West (1821–1919) became the first mayor of Ames in 1870. With his wife Harriet, from 1869 to 1892, he ran Ames's first hotel, known as West House, on Douglas Avenue on the site of the present Octagon Center for the Arts. West was a highly respected pioneer businessman who also served on the Ames School Board in the 1880s when Central School was built on the site of the present Ames City Hall on Clark Avenue and Sixth Street. The Wests raised several daughters and sons. William West spent the last of his life living with his son in northwest Iowa.

== Geography ==
Ames is located along the western edge of Story County, roughly 30 miles (48 km) north of the state capital, Des Moines. Passing through Ames is the cross country line of the Union Pacific Railroad and two small streams (the South Skunk River and Ioway Creek).

According to the United States Census Bureau, the city has a total area of 24.27 square miles (62.86 km^{2}), of which 24.21 square miles (62.70 km^{2}) is land and 0.06 square miles (0.16 km^{2}) is water.

=== Neighborhoods ===
- Ames Main Street Historic District
- Campustown, south of Iowa State University, is a high-density mixed-use neighborhood with many student apartments, nightlife venues, and restaurants.

=== Climate ===
Ames has a humid continental climate (Köppen climate classification Dfa). On average, the warmest month is July and the coldest is January. The highest recorded temperature was 109 °F (43 °C) on July 24, 1901, and the lowest was −37 °F (−38 °C) January 25, 1894.

Climate data for Ames, Iowa (1991–2020 temperature/precipitation normals, 1978-2024 otherwise)
Month	Jan	Feb	Mar	Apr	May	Jun	Jul	Aug	Sep	Oct	Nov	Dec	Year
Record high °F (°C)	67 (19)	76 (24)	84 (29)	89 (32)	97 (36)	100 (38)	102 (39)	100 (38)	99 (37)	95 (35)	81 (27)	73 (23)	102 (39)
Mean daily maximum °F (°C)	28.0 (−2.2)	32.8 (0.4)	46.0 (7.8)	60.0 (15.6)	70.8 (21.6)	80.4 (26.9)	83.9 (28.8)	81.8 (27.7)	75.9 (24.4)	62.6 (17.0)	46.7 (8.2)	33.5 (0.8)	58.5 (14.8)
Daily mean °F (°C)	18.9 (−7.3)	23.5 (−4.7)	35.7 (2.1)	48.1 (8.9)	59.7 (15.4)	69.8 (21.0)	73.2 (22.9)	70.8 (21.6)	63.5 (17.5)	50.9 (10.5)	36.8 (2.7)	24.8 (−4.0)	48.0 (8.9)
Mean daily minimum °F (°C)	9.8 (−12.3)	14.2 (−9.9)	25.4 (−3.7)	36.2 (2.3)	48.6 (9.2)	59.1 (15.1)	62.5 (16.9)	59.9 (15.5)	51.0 (10.6)	39.2 (4.0)	26.8 (−2.9)	16.2 (−8.8)	37.4 (3.0)
Record low °F (°C)	−33 (−36)	−28 (−33)	−14 (−26)	12 (−11)	25 (−4)	42 (6)	47 (8)	44 (7)	29 (−2)	15 (−9)	−5 (−21)	−19 (−28)	−33 (−36)
Average precipitation inches (mm)	0.98 (25)	1.20 (30)	2.18 (55)	3.80 (97)	5.31 (135)	5.41 (137)	4.51 (115)	4.73 (120)	3.84 (98)	2.65 (67)	1.99 (51)	1.46 (37)	38.06 (967)
Average snowfall inches (cm)	6.6 (17)	7.8 (20)	3.8 (9.7)	0.7 (1.8)	0.0 (0.0)	0.0 (0.0)	0.0 (0.0)	0.0 (0.0)	0.0 (0.0)	0.4 (1.0)	2.5 (6.4)	6.5 (17)	28.3 (72.9)
Average extreme snow depth inches (cm)	3.1 (7.9)	2.9 (7.4)	0.6 (1.5)	0.2 (0.51)	0.0 (0.0)	0.0 (0.0)	0.0 (0.0)	0.0 (0.0)	0.0 (0.0)	0.0 (0.0)	0.2 (0.51)	1.6 (4.1)	3.1 (7.9)
Average precipitation days (≥ 0.01 in)	7	6	9	10	12	11	9	9	8	8	7	7	103
Average snowy days (≥ 0.1 in)	4	3	2	1	0	0	0	0	0	0	1	4	15
Source: NOAA

== Demographics ==
Historical populations
Year	Pop.	±%
1870	636	—
1880	1,153	+81.3%
1890	1,276	+10.7%
1900	2,422	+89.8%
1910	4,223	+74.4%
1920	6,270	+48.5%
1930	10,261	+63.7%
1940	12,555	+22.4%
1950	22,898	+82.4%
1960	27,003	+17.9%
1970	39,505	+46.3%
1980	45,775	+15.9%
1990	47,198	+3.1%
2000	50,731	+7.5%
2010	58,965	+16.2%
2020	66,427	+12.7%
Source:"U.S. Census website". United States Census Bureau. and Iowa Data Center; Source: U.S. Decennial Census

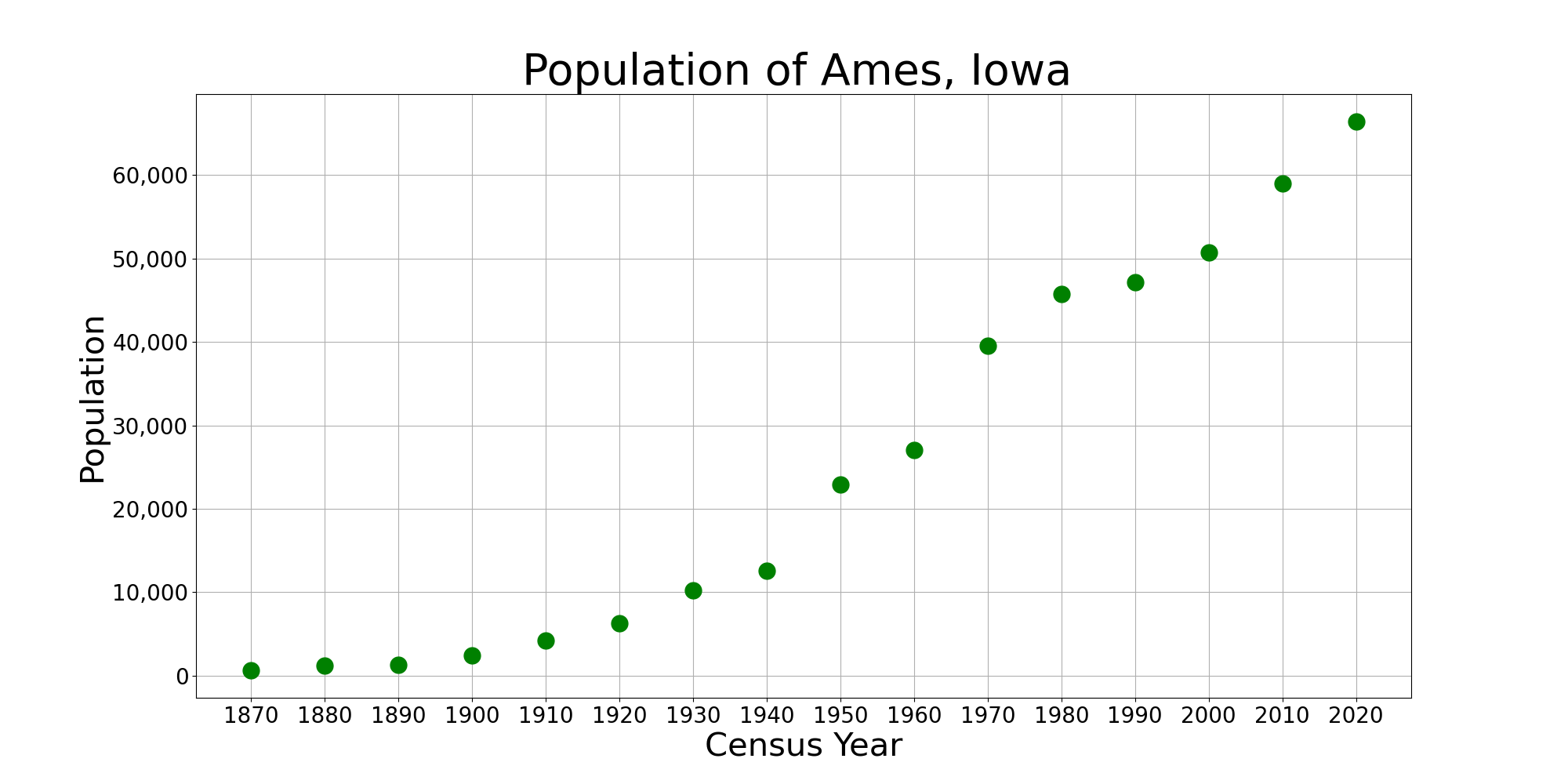
The population of Ames, Iowa from US census data

=== 2020 census ===
As of the 2020 census, Ames had a population of 66,427 and 25,579 households, of which 10,641 were families. The population density was 2,407.5 inhabitants per square mile (929.5/km^{2}). There were 27,806 housing units at an average density of 1,007.8 per square mile (389.1/km^{2}); 8.0% were vacant, with a homeowner vacancy rate of 2.0% and a rental vacancy rate of 8.0%.

About 99.2% of residents lived in urban areas, while 0.8% lived in rural areas.

The median age was 23.6 years. 12.8% of residents were under the age of 18 and 10.8% of residents were 65 years of age or older. For every 100 females there were 112.7 males, and for every 100 females age 18 and over there were 114.1 males age 18 and over.

Of the 25,579 households, 17.5% had children under the age of 18 living in them. Of all households, 32.5% were married-couple households, 6.8% were cohabiting couples, 29.5% were households with a female householder and no spouse or partner present, and 31.2% were households with a male householder and no spouse or partner present. About 58.4% were non-families; 35.9% of all households were made up of individuals, and 8.1% had someone living alone who was 65 years of age or older.

Racial composition as of the 2020 census
Race	Number	Percent
White	51,469	77.5%
Black or African American	2,765	4.2%
American Indian and Alaska Native	214	0.3%
Asian	5,258	7.9%
Native Hawaiian and Other Pacific Islander	31	0.0%
Some other race	2,091	3.1%
Two or more races	4,599	6.9%
Hispanic or Latino (of any race)	3,948	5.9%

=== 2010 census ===
As of the census of 2010, there were 58,965 people, 22,759 households, and 9,959 families residing in the city. The population density was 2,435.6 inhabitants per square mile (940.4/km^{2}). There were 23,876 housing units at an average density of 986.2 per square mile (380.8/km^{2}). The racial makeup of the city was 84.5% White, 3.4% African American, 0.2% Native American, 8.8% Asian, 1.1% from other races, and 2.0% from two or more races. Hispanic or Latino of any race were 3.4% of the population.

There were 22,759 households, of which 19.1% had children under the age of 18 living with them, 35.6% were married couples living together, 5.4% had a female householder with no husband present, 2.7% had a male householder with no wife present, and 56.2% were non-families. 30.5% of all households were made up of individuals, and 6.2% had someone living alone who was 65 years of age or older. The average household size was 2.25 and the average family size was 2.82.

The median age in the city was 23.8 years. 13.4% of residents were under the age of 18; 40.5% were between the ages of 18 and 24; 22.9% were from 25 to 44; 15% were from 45 to 64; and 8.1% were 65 years of age or older. The gender makeup of the city was 53.0% male and 47.0% female.

=== 2000 census ===
As of the census of 2000, there were 50,731 people, 18,085 households, and 8,970 families residing in the city. The population density was 2,352.3 inhabitants per square mile (908.2/km^{2}). There were 18,757 housing units at an average density of 869.7 per square mile (335.8/km^{2}). The racial makeup of the city was 87.34% White, 7.70% Asian, 2.65% African American, 0.04% Native American, 0.76% Pacific Islander and other races, and 1.36% from two or more races. Hispanic or Latino of any race were 1.98% of the population.

There were 18,085 households, out of which 22.3% had children under the age of 18 living with them, 42.0% were married couples living together, 5.3% had a female householder with no husband present, and 50.4% were non-families. 28.5% of all households were made up of individuals, and 5.9% had someone living alone who was 65 years of age or older. The average household size was 2.30 and the average family size was 2.85.

Age spread: 14.6% under the age of 18, 40.0% from 18 to 24, 23.7% from 25 to 44, 13.9% from 45 to 64, and 7.7% who were 65 years of age or older. The median age was 24 years. For every 100 females, there were 109.3 males. For every 100 females age 18 and over, there were 109.9 males.

The median income for a household in the city was $36,042, and the median income for a family was $56,439. Males had a median income of $37,877 versus $28,198 for females. The per capita income for the city was $18,881. About 7.6% of families and 20.4% of the population were below the poverty line, including 9.2% of those under age 18 and 4.1% of those age 65 or over.

=== Metropolitan area ===
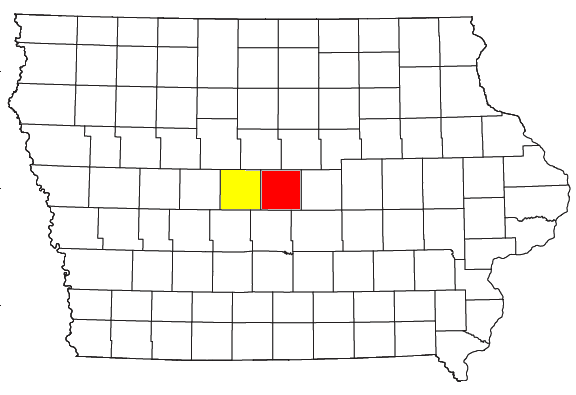
Location of the Ames-Boone CSA and its components: Ames Metropolitan Statistical Area Boone Micropolitan Statistical Area

The U.S. Census Bureau designates the Ames MSA as encompassing all of Story County. While Ames is the largest city in Story County, the county seat is in the nearby city of Nevada, 8 miles (13 km) east of Ames.

Ames metropolitan statistical area combined with the Boone, Iowa micropolitan statistical area (Boone County, Iowa) make up the larger Ames-Boone combined statistical area. Ames is the larger principal city of the Combined Statistical Area that includes all of Story County, Iowa and Boone County, Iowa. which had a combined population of 106,205 at the 2000 census.

== Economy ==
Iowa State University contains the U.S. Department of Agriculture's National Animal Disease Center, which developed the Ames strain, and the U.S. Department of Energy's Ames National Laboratory, a major materials research and development facility. Located in Ames are the main offices of the Iowa Department of Transportation, and state and Federal institutions are the largest employers in Ames.

The Iowa State University Research Park is a not-for-profit business development incubator located in Ames, and affiliated with Iowa State University.

The Bureau of Labor Statistics ranked Ames and Boulder, Colorado as having the lowest unemployment rate (2.5%) of any metropolitan area in the United States in 2016. By June 2018, unemployment in Ames had fallen even further, to 1.5%, though wage increases for workers were not keeping pace with rising rents.

=== Top employers ===
As of 2022, the top employers in the city are:

#	Employer	# of Employees	Percentage of Total City Employment
1	Iowa State University	18,212	33.33%
2	Mary Greeley Medical Center	1,407	2.57%
3	City of Ames	1,382	2.53%
4	McFarland Clinic, P. C.	1,200	2.20%
5	Danfoss	1,052	1.93%
6	Iowa Department of Transportation	975	1.78%
7	USDA	750	1.37%
8	Ames Community School District	700	1.28%
9	Hach Chemical	580	1.06%
10	Workiva	550	1.01%

== Arts and culture ==
- The Ames History Museum was founded in 1980, and includes a historic schoolhouse.
- Ames Public Library, a Carnegie library, was founded in 1904.
- The Octagon Center for the Arts includes galleries, art classes, art studios, and a retail shop. They sponsor the local street fair, The Octagon Arts Festival, and holds an annual National Juried Exhibition judging artwork in material categories such as Clay, Fiber, Paper, Glass, Metal, and Wood.

== Sports ==
The Iowa State Cyclones play a variety of sports in the Ames area. The Iowa State Cyclones football team plays at Jack Trice Stadium in Ames. The Cyclones' Men's and Women's Basketball teams and Volleyball teams play at Hilton Coliseum. The Iowa State Cyclones are a charter member of the Big 12 Conference in all sports and compete in NCAA Division I-A.

== Parks and recreation ==
Ames has multiple parks, including Brookside Park, River Valley Park and the Ada Hayden Heritage Park, which contains a lake, wetlands and trails. Reiman Gardens, owned by Iowa State University, is a public garden located in Ames.

== Government ==
From 1979 through 2011, Ames was the location of the Ames Straw Poll, which was held every August prior to a presidential election year in which the Republican presidential nomination was undecided (meaning there was no Republican president running for re-election—as in 2011, 2007, 1999, 1995, 1987, and 1979). The poll would gauge support for the various Republican candidates amongst attendees of a fundraising dinner benefiting the Iowa Republican Party. The straw poll was frequently seen by national media and party insiders as a first test of organizational strength in Iowa. In 2015, the straw poll was to be moved to nearby Boone before the Iowa Republican Party eventually decided to cancel it altogether.

Ames is part of Iowa House of Representatives District 50, currently represented by Ross Wilburn. It is part of Iowa Senate District 25, currently represented by Herman Quirmbach.

== Education ==
Schools located in Ames are administered by the Ames Community School District.

=== Public high school in Ames ===
- Ames High School: Grades 9–12

=== Public elementary/middle schools in Ames ===
- David Edwards Elementary: K-5
- Abbie Sawyer Elementary School: Grades K-5
- Kate Mitchell Elementary School: Grades K-5
- Warren H. Meeker Elementary School: Grades K-5
- Gertrude Fellows Elementary School: Grades K-5
- Ames Middle School: Grades 6–8

=== Private schools in Ames ===
- Ames Christian School
- Saint Cecilia School (preK – 5th grade)

=== Iowa State University ===
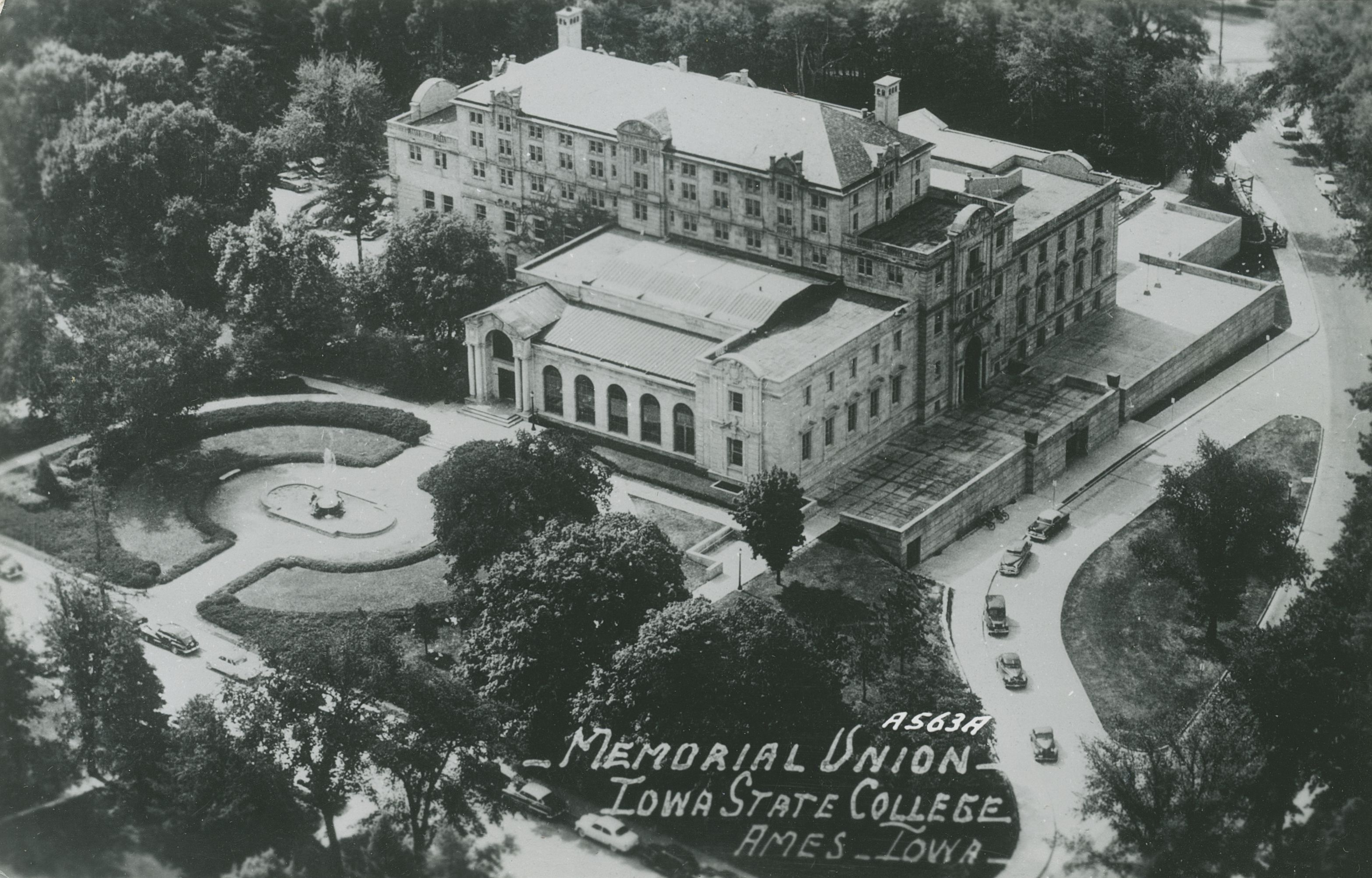
Memorial Union, Iowa State College, 1940

Founded in 1856, Iowa State University is a public research university located in Ames. The university is a member of the American Association of Universities and the Big 12 Conference. ISU was the first designated land-grant university in the United States.

Notable buildings on the university campus include the Farm House Museum, Beardshear Hall, Morrill Hall, Memorial Union, Catt Hall, Curtiss Hall, Carver Hall, Parks Library, the Campanile, Hilton Coliseum, C.Y. Stephens Auditorium, Fisher Theater, Jack Trice Stadium, Lied Recreation Center, and numerous residence halls.

== Media ==
=== Online and newsprint ===
- Ames Tribune, newspaper published in Ames.
- Iowa State Daily, Iowa State University student newspaper.
- The Des Moines Register
- Story County Sun, weekly county newspaper published in Ames.

=== Radio stations licensed to Ames ===
- KURE, student radio operated at Iowa State University.
- WOI-FM, Iowa Public Radio's flagship "Studio One" station, broadcasting an NPR news format during the day and a music format in the evening, owned and operated at Iowa State University.
- WOI (AM), Iowa Public Radio's flagship station delivering a 24-hour news format consisting mainly of NPR programming, owned and operated at Iowa State University.
- KOEZ, Adult Contemporary station licensed to Ames, but operated in Des Moines.
- KCYZ, Hot Adult Contemporary station owned and operated by Clear Channel in Ames.
- KASI, news/talk station owned and operated by Clear Channel in Ames.
- KNWM-FM, Contemporary Christian Madrid/Ames station owned and operated by the University of Northwestern – St. Paul - simulcast with KNWI-FM Osceola/Des Moines
- KHOI, Community Radio station licensed to Story City with studios in Ames. KHOI broadcasts music and local public affairs programs and is affiliated with the Pacifica Radio network.

Ames is also served by stations in the Des Moines media market, which includes Clear Channel's 50,000-watt talk station WHO, music stations KAZR, KDRB, KGGO, KKDM, KHKI, KIOA, KJJY, KRNT, KSPZ and KSTZ, talk station KWQW, and sports stations KXNO and KXNO-FM.

=== Television ===
Ames is served by the Des Moines media market. WOI-DT, the ABC affiliate in central Iowa, was originally owned and operated by Iowa State University until the 1990s. The station is licensed to Ames, with studio's located in West Des Moines. Other stations serving Ames include KCCI, KDIN-TV, WHO-DT, KCWI-TV, KDMI, KDSM-TV and KFPX-TV.

Channel 12 is owned by the City of Ames, broadcasting city council meetings and local events. The station has received a NATOA Government Programming Award and a Telly Award.

Channel 16 is a public access TV channel.

== Infrastructure ==
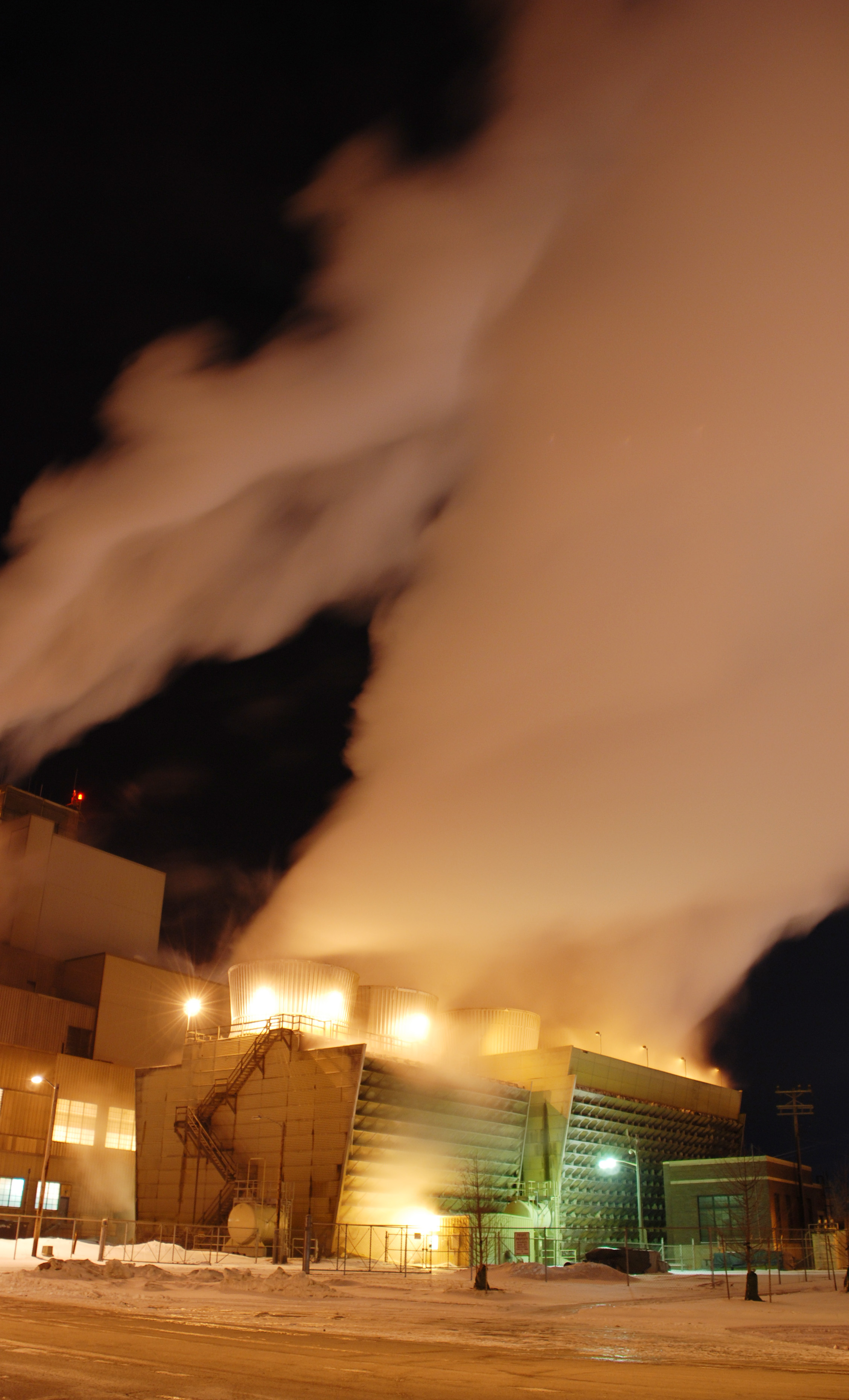
City power plant at night blows steam into the air

=== Transportation ===
Highways include:

- U.S. Highway 30
- U.S. 69
- Interstate 35

Ames Municipal Airport is located 1 mile (1.6 km) southeast of the city.

CyRide is a local bus system that serves both university students and the general public. It is the most-used transit system in the state of Iowa, with CyRide having provided over 4.7 million rides in 2024.

Ames is the location of the headquarters of the Iowa Department of Transportation.

=== Health care ===
Ames is served by Mary Greeley Medical Center, a 220-bed regional hospital.

== Notable people ==
=== Acting ===
- Evan Helmuth, actor (1977–2017) (Fever Pitch, The Devil Inside)
- Nick Nolte, actor, lived in Ames, 1945-1950

=== Artists and photographers ===
- Mary Alice Barton (1917–2003), quilter, quilt historian, collector, and philanthropist
- Edith Baumann, abstract artist
- John E. Buck, sculptor
- Robert Crumb, cartoonist and musician, the Crumb family moved to Ames in August 1950, for two years
- Margaret Lloyd, opera singer
- Laurel Nakadate, American video artist, filmmaker and photographer
- Velma Wallace Rayness (1896–1977), author, painter and artist
- Brian Smith, Pulitzer Prize-winning photographer, born July 16, 1959

=== Aviation ===
- Neta Snook Southern, pioneer aviator, taught Amelia Earhart to fly

=== Musicians ===
- Buster B. Jones, fingerpicker guitarist
- John Darnielle, musician from indie rock band The Mountain Goats; former Ames resident
- The Envy Corps, indie rock band
- Leslie Hall, electronic rap musician/Gem Sweater collector, born in Ames in 1981
- Peter Schickele, musician, born in Ames in 1935
- Richie Hayward, drummer and founding member of the band Little Feat; former Ames resident and graduate of Ames High School

=== Journalists ===
- Robert Bartley, editorial page editor of The Wall Street Journal and a Presidential Medal of Freedom recipient; raised in Ames and ISU graduate
- Wally Bruner, ABC News journalist and television host
- Michael Gartner, former president of NBC News; retired to own and publish the Ames Tribune

=== Politicians ===
- Ruth Bascom, Mayor of Eugene, Oregon
- Edward Mezvinsky, former U.S. Congressman; father-in-law of Chelsea Clinton; raised in Ames
- Bee Nguyen, former Georgia (U.S. state) state representative
- Bob Walkup, Mayor of Tucson, Arizona
- Lee Teng-hui, President of the Republic of China, ISU graduate
- Henry A. Wallace, 11th United States Secretary of Agriculture, 10th United States Secretary of Commerce, and 33rd Vice President of the United States, ISU graduate; lived in Ames from 1892 - 1896

=== Sports ===
- Harrison Barnes, NBA player, 2015 NBA champion, 2016 U.S. Olympic gold medalist, Ames HS graduate
- Sebastián Botero, soccer player and coach
- Joe Burrow, NFL quarterback for the Cincinnati Bengals, Heisman Trophy winner. Born in Ames
- Doug McDermott, basketball player, Ames HS graduate
- Kip Corrington, NFL player
- Dick Gibbs, NBA player, Ames HS graduate
- Terry Hoage, NFL player
- Fred Hoiberg, retired NBA basketball player; raised in Ames, ISU graduate, former ISU basketball coach, former coach of the Chicago Bulls and current Nebraska men's basketball coach.
- Herb Sies, pro football player and coach
- Billy Sunday, evangelist and Major League Baseball player; born in Ames in 1863
- Fred Tisue, Olympian water polo player

=== Scientists ===
- Laurel Blair Salton Clark, astronaut, died on STS-107
- Achih H. Chen, plastic surgeon
- Charles W. "Chuck" Durham, civil engineer, philanthropist, civic leader, former CEO and chairman emeritus of HDR, Inc.; raised in Ames
- Lyle Goodhue, scientist, lived and studied in Ames 1925–1934
- Frank Spedding, chemist, creator of the Ames Process during the Manhattan Project
- Dan Shechtman, awarded 2011 Nobel Prize in Chemistry for "the discovery of quasicrystals"; Professor of Materials Science at Iowa State University (2004–present) and Associate at the Department of Energy's Ames National Laboratory

=== Writers and poets ===
- Ann Cotten, poet, born in Ames, grew up in Vienna
- Brian Evenson, author
- Jane Espenson, writer and producer for television, including Buffy the Vampire Slayer and Star Trek: The Next Generation, grew up in Ames
- Michelle Hoover, author, born in Ames
- Meg Johnson, poet and dancer
- Fern Kupfer, author
- Joseph Geha, author
- Ted Kooser, U.S. Poet Laureate; raised in Ames and ISU graduate
- John Madson, freelance naturalist of tallgrass prairie ecosystems
- Sara Paretsky, author of the V.I. Warshawski mysteries; born in Ames in 1947
- Lincoln Peirce, cartoonist/writer of the Big Nate comics and books
- Jane Smiley, Pulitzer Prize-winning novelist; former instructor at ISU (1981–1996); used ISU as the basis for her novel Moo
- Neal Stephenson, author, grew up in Ames
- Hugh Young, coauthor of University Physics textbook

=== Other ===
- Neva Morris, at her death (2010) second-oldest person in the world and oldest American aged 114 years; lived in Ames her entire life
- Todd Snyder (fashion designer)
- Nate Staniforth, magician
- Brian Thompson, businessman (1974–2024)

== In popular culture ==
- Ames is featured in Jeffrey Zaslow's 2009 book The Girls from Ames.

== See also ==
- North Grand Mall
