= KBGG =

Radio station in Des Moines, Iowa

Coordinates: 41°35′30″N 93°31′43.8″W

- Des Moines, Iowa; United States
- Broadcast area: Des Moines metropolitan area
- Frequency: 1700 kHz
- Branding: 101.3 & 1700 The Champ

Programming
- Format: Sports
- Affiliations: Infinity Sports Network; VSiN Radio; Westwood One Sports; Kansas City Chiefs; Minnesota Twins

Ownership
- Owner: Cumulus Media; (Radio License Holding CBC, LLC)
- Sister stations: KGGO; KHKI; KJJY; KWQW

History
- First air date: July 1998
- Last air date: March 28, 2025
- Former call signs: KBGG (1997–2002); WSJZ (2002)

Technical information
- Facility ID: 87105
- Class: B
- Power: 10,000 watts day; 1,000 watts night
- Translator: 101.3 K267CY (Des Moines)

KBGG (1700 AM) was a commercial radio station in Des Moines, Iowa. The station was owned by Cumulus Media and aired a sports radio format, known as "101.3 & 1700 The Champ".

KBGG's studios and offices were located in Urbandale. The transmitter was located off Fairview Lane in Pleasant Hill. KBGG was in the "Expanded Band," one of only a handful of stations at AM 1700. Its power was 10,000 watts by day and 1,000 watts at night, using a non-directional antenna.

== Programming and personalities ==
At its closure, KBGG primarily carried the Infinity Sports Network lineup. KBGG served as the Des Moines affiliate for the Kansas City Chiefs and the University of Northern Iowa men's basketball and football. KBGG also carried the NFL on Westwood One Sports.

== History ==
KBGG originated as the expanded band "twin" of an existing station on the standard AM band.

On March 17, 1997, the Federal Communications Commission (FCC) announced that 88 stations had been given permission to move to newly available "Expanded Band" transmitting frequencies, ranging from 1610 to 1700 kHz, with KKSO in Des Moines, a station that dated to 1947, authorized to move from 1390 kHz to 1700 kHz. The new frequency would give KKSO more daytime power and a non-directional signal.

A construction permit for the expanded band station was assigned the call sign KBGG on November 12, 1997. It went on the air in July 1998 with the business news/talk format that had been on KKSO, which went silent. KBGG later shifted to a mix of CNN Headline News and Spanish-language programming. The FCC's policy was that both the original station and its expanded band counterpart could operate simultaneously for up to five years, after which owners would have to turn in one of the two licenses, depending on whether they preferred the new assignment or elected to remain on the original frequency. While KKSO had returned to the air by July 2000 simulcasting CNN Headline News with KBGG, it was ultimately decided to transfer full operations to the expanded band station. On February 2, 2001, the license for KKSO on 1390 AM was cancelled.

The WSJZ call sign was briefly parked on the station from June 6 to 18, 2002; it then reverted to KBGG. From 2003 to 2005, the KBGG call sign was shared with KBGG-FM 98.3.

In the early 2000s, KBGG broadcast a Spanish-language format as "La Ley". In September 2005, operator Emilio Duran moved "La Ley" to KDLS-FM after Citadel Broadcasting ended his lease of KBGG and began airing a different Regional Mexican music format, "La Indomable".

Logo before translator sign on

On February 25, 2008, KBGG relaunched as sports radio station "1700 The Champ". After having been an ESPN Radio affiliate for nearly five years, the station became an affiliate of CBS Sports Radio on January 2, 2013, as part of a Cumulus Media-wide switch. Cumulus, which owned KBGG, had a financial stake in CBS Sports Radio.

In October 2015, the station became a talk/sports hybrid and branded itself 1700 KBGG The Big Talker. Weekday mornings began with Good Day With Doug Stephan, featuring news director Dianna Kelly with local information, followed by The Dave Ramsey Show and Red Eye Radio heard overnight. In 2017, Marty Tirrell of the Marty and Miller show stopped making payments to Cumulus Media and the show ended on KBGG. By August 2017, The Ken Miller Show started the sports portion of the station's lineup, followed by CBS Sports Radio programming and Jimmy B and TC. On October 15, 2018, the station returned to full-time sports talk.

On December 7, 2021, KBGG began simulcasting on newly licensed FM translator K267CY (101.3 MHz). The antenna was co-located on sister FM station KHKI's tower in Johnston.

On March 28, 2025, KBGG went silent. While Cumulus considered selling the station, the licenses for KBGG and K267CY were submitted to the FCC for cancellation on March 27, 2026, and the stations were deleted four days later.
