= KIHS (disambiguation) =

KIHS (105.5 MHz) is a commercial FM radio station licensed to Perry, Iowa, and serving the Des Moines metropolitan area.

KIHS may also refer to:

- Keewaytinook Internet High School, a virtual school operated by the Keewaytinook Okimakanak Council serving aboriginal communities in northern Ontario, Canada
- Kent Island High School, in Stevensville, Maryland, United States
- KQBV, a radio station licensed to Adel, Iowa, United States, which held the call sign KIHS from 2001 to 2025
