= KIOA =

Radio station in Des Moines, Iowa

- Des Moines, Iowa; United States
- Broadcast area: Des Moines metropolitan area
- Frequency: 93.3 MHz (HD Radio)
- Branding: 93.3 KIOA

Programming
- Format: Classic hits
- Subchannels: HD2: Top 40 (CHR) "Hits 99.9"
- Affiliations: Premiere Networks

Ownership
- Owner: Saga Communications; (Saga Communications of Iowa, LLC)
- Sister stations: KAZR; KOEZ; KRNT; KPSZ; KSTZ

History
- First air date: October 2, 1964
- Former call signs: KWDM (1964–1969); KYNA (1971–1972); KIOA-FM (1972–1976); KMGK (1976–1986); KKXI (1986); KDWZ (1986–1990); KIOA-FM (1990–2001)
- Call sign meaning: Kreating Iowa

Technical information
- Licensing authority: FCC
- Facility ID: 58547
- Class: C1
- ERP: 82,000 watts
- HAAT: 325 m (1,066 ft)
- Transmitter coordinates: 41.632°N 93.457°W
- Translator: HD2: 99.9 K260AM (Des Moines)

Links
- Public license information: Public file; LMS
- Webcast: Listen Live
- Website: kioa.com

KIOA (93.3 FM) is a commercial radio station in Des Moines, Iowa, United States. It is owned by Saga Communications, operating as part of its Des Moines Media Group, and airs a classic hits radio format. The station's studios are located at 1416 Locust Street along with Saga's other Des Moines stations (KSTZ, KAZR, KOEZ, KRNT and KPSZ). The transmitter is located off 24th Street SE, near 6th Avenue SE, in Altoona.

KIOA broadcasts in the HD Radio hybrid format. Its HD2 subchannel carries a Top 40 (CHR) format branded as "HITS 99.9", which is also heard on 250–watt FM translator station 99.9 K260AM in Des Moines.

== History ==
=== KWDM ===
The 93.3 frequency got its start on October 2, 1964, as KWDM. George Webber, who was the founder of the original KWDM (1150 AM, later KWKY), brought back his unique programming after having sold the AM station in 1959 to the 3M Corporation. The FM station consisted of block programming of music, including classical, operatic and ethnic music not heard elsewhere in Des Moines. The schedule also included a weekday talk show, "Listen While You Work," hosted by his wife, Edith Dunham Webber, and Drake University and high school sports.

The station had a large record library of rare classical and operatic albums.

In 1968, George Webber sold KWDM to a local group known as the SEQ Corporation. The studios were moved to the Mike Wilson building at 4111 Hubbell Avenue, on the east side of Des Moines. The format went from talk to rock and roll to country music. A controversial talk show, the "Hawkeye Nightline," with Russ Lavine, aired Monday-Saturday nights, previously heard on KDMI (97.3 FM, now KHKI). On Sunday nights, John Birch Society members Jim and Mary Parker hosted that three-hour slot.

Country disc jockeys included Bob Neel, Jack Myer and Rex Youngs. National news from the ABC FM Network aired 15 minutes after the hour. On April 10, 1969, the station went dark, after the owners of the tower and transmitter site, John and Jean Murphy, shut down the station due to non-payment of rent. A month later, Webber regained control of the station, operating it at reduced hours. In May 1969, the final selection was played, Tchaikovsky's "Swan Lake" ballet. Although Webber wanted to bring back the fine music format, he lacked the finances and was too far advanced in his years to make a go of it. The 93.3 frequency went dark for two years until 1971.

=== Top 40 KYNA ===
On April 26, 1971, the 93.3 frequency came back on the air as KYNA, airing a Top 40 format, competing against the well established KIOA (940 AM, later KPSZ).

Although KYNA was programmed well—including the syndicated American Top 40 program with Casey Kasem—and had high-quality DJs, many homes and cars did not have FM radios in the early 1970s. KYNA lasted for only about a year when it was sold to the owners of its Top 40 competition, KIOA.

=== Oldies KIOA-FM ===
In 1972, KYNA was bought by the Mid-America Broadcasting Company. In November, the call sign was changed to KIOA-FM, and the station became "Solid Gold Oldies, KIOA-FM 93.3". From 6 a.m. until 6 p.m., the station aired a 1950s oldies format, and simulcasted 940 AM during the remainder of the day. Once again, it was hard to establish a listener base on FM radio in the 1970s, so KIOA-FM also struggled in the ratings.

In the early 1970s, KIOA-FM put together a double album of oldies, called "Solid Gold." It contained 24 hits and had a board game on the inside of the cover. These collectible records are rare and hard to find. The records were made to help improve KIOA-FM's popularity and bring in some extra cash flow as well.

=== Magic 93 KMGK ===
In March 1976, the station flipped back to Top 40, this time as "Magic 93"; with it, the call letters changed to KMGK. This was the most successful format to date on the frequency, as the station pulled in good ratings through the late 70s and early 80s.

By the mid-80s, KMGK found itself fighting for market share as KRNQ, KCCQ, and KLYF began also playing hit music on FM radio. KMGK slipped below both of its competitors, and management decided a new format was needed.

=== Country and Rock hits ===
An FM station, KJJY, was taking some of the country music audience of KSO's. It seemed like it might be a good idea for 93.3 to also switch to country as it had a stronger signal than KJJY. The owner, Midwest Communications, promoted the change to "Hot Country Hits, K93FM", which began November 7, 1984. Midwest kept the KMGK call letters for about two years. In April 1986, the station rebranded as KKXI, but it failed to advance in the ratings.

On August 1, 1986, the station switched back to Top 40 for a third time as "Z93" KDWZ, this time using a rock-leaning direction while avoiding titles that sounded Rhythmic or Dance oriented. Competing head-on with the better established KRNQ, KCCQ, and KLYF once again was not easy.

=== Return to Oldies, evolution to Classic hits ===
On October 10, 1990, at 7 p.m., KDWZ returned to oldies by once again simulcasting KIOA (AM)'s oldies format as "All Oldies KIOA", along with a callsign change back to KIOA-FM.

In 1993, Saga Communications purchased KIOA-AM-FM from Midwest Communications of Iowa, as the simulcast continued, but the branding switched to "Oldies 93.3 KIOA." Over time, KIOA-FM's listener base grew and the station became one of the most successful in the Des Moines area. On December 16, 1996, the simulcast ended, with the AM becoming "Talk 940 KXTK". The call letters then reverted to just KIOA, with the "-FM" suffix dropped.

In September 2008, the 1960s music was dropped and KIOA evolved into a classic hits format. In addition, the station dropped the "Oldies 93.3" moniker in favor of branding by the KIOA call letters, and changed slogans to "Iowa's Greatest Hits", with KIOA's playlist primarily focusing on the music of the 1970s and 1980s.

KIOA's playlist features music from the 1970s and 1980s, with some 1990s tracks being played.

=== Air-staff changes ===
Previous logo

On July 31, 2007, Saga Communications announced that it would not be renewing the contract of longtime KIOA morning program co-host Polly Carver-Kimm. Carver-Kimm had been part of "Maxwell and Polly in the Morning," and had also been news director for Saga's other five Des Moines radio stations. Also in July 2007, Dic Youngs, also known as "Youngsy," announced that he would be retiring from KIOA. He told a local newspaper that it was not his choice to retire. Youngs had been with KIOA, both AM and FM, for over 40 years, often talking about old-times and playing 45 RPM records on air. Youngs retired from KIOA on his 66th birthday on September 30, 2007. He would move to sister station KRNT on a part-time basis. Youngs remained at KRNT until his death on October 1, 2009, at age 68.

On July 23, 2008, KIOA announced the addition of former Des Moines morning personality Pam Dixon to the KIOA morning show, joining longtime morning host Maxwell Schaeffer. Dixon said, "I feel like the stars have aligned and it was the right time for me to return to broadcasting. I've been a fan of KIOA my whole life and it's MY music." A Des Moines native and Hoover High graduate, Dixon attended the University of Iowa. She was first heard on KRNT and Q-102 before beginning a 10-year run on KLYF which ended in 1996. Dixon would retire in April 2017. Amy Sweet, who had been heard on sister station KAZR, would join the morning show in 2014. In May 2018, Schaeffer left the station after 23 years; he was replaced in July by Luke Matthews. Sweet was let go in January 2020 due to corporate layoffs, and would be succeeded by Heather McGregor. Jeriney, formerly of KRBZ Kansas City, replaced McGregor as Matthews' co-host in January 2022.

Leigh McNabb joined the station as Program Director in fall of 2019. She helmed the station until November 2025 when she moved to program sister station KSTZ. Jimmy Wright, who had been on KSTZ for 35 years, moved to KIOA to assume the duties of Program Director (now referred in Saga as Director of Content). Wright hosts the afternoon shift.

== K260AM ==
K260AM
Translator of KIOA 93.3-HD2
- Des Moines, Iowa; United States
- Broadcast area: Des Moines, Iowa
- Frequency: 99.9 MHz
- Branding: Hits 99.9

Programming
- Format: Contemporary hit radio

Ownership
- Owner: Saga Communications; (Saga Communications of Iowa, LLC)
- Sister stations: KAZR, KIOA, KOEZ, KPSZ, KRNT, KSTZ

History
- First air date: 2011

Technical information
- Licensing authority: FCC
- Facility ID: 152401
- Class: D
- ERP: 250 watts
- HAAT: 299.4 m (982 ft)
- Transmitter coordinates: 41.584486°N 93.635332°W

Links
- Public license information: Public file; LMS
- Webcast: Listen Live
- Website: hits999fm.com

K260AM ("Hits 99.9") is a contemporary hit radio station serving the Des Moines, Iowa, area of the United States. It broadcasts at 99.9 on the FM dial and on HD Radio subchannel KIOA 93.3-HD2. The station is owned by Saga Communications as part of its Des Moines Radio Group; its studios are located in Des Moines along with Saga's other Des Moines stations (KSTZ, KIOA, KAZR, KOEZ, KRNT and KPSZ). The station is also a reporter in Nielsen Broadcast Data Systems' overall Top 40 panel due to being a contributor on the BDS Rhythmic Top 40 panel.

=== Station history ===
The station signed on as a translator for KSTZ in September 2011, but after it was announced that rhythmic contemporary-formatted KZHZ ("Hits 105.9") was sold to Iowa Public Radio a month earlier, Saga Communications quietly acquired the format and intellectual property from Connoisseur Media (KZHZ's parent company) and announced on October 25, 2011, that it would relaunch the format on both KIOA-HD2 and on translator K260AM, on the closing of KZHZ's sale to IPR. "Hits 99.9" officially signed on the air on October 27, after stunting with kissing sound effects, poking fun at competitor KKDM "Kiss 107.5", which has aired a mainstream Top 40/CHR format since 1999. Since 2011, the station has shifted its rhythmic format to a more mainstream Top 40/CHR direction. As of 2021, in addition to competing against KKDM, it also competes with Cumulus Media’s KWQW. No personalities are heard on the station.
