= KKRF =

- Stuart, Iowa; United States
- Frequency: 107.9 MHz
- Branding: K107.9

Programming
- Format: Country

Ownership
- Owner: M&M Broadcasting, Inc.
- Sister stations: KDLS, KGRA

History
- First air date: August 11, 1993
- Former call signs: KAGD (1992–1993, CP)

Technical information
- Licensing authority: FCC
- Facility ID: 13822
- Class: C3
- ERP: 9,400 watts
- HAAT: 150 m (492 ft)
- Transmitter coordinates: 41°27′39.8″N 94°29′23.2″W

Links
- Public license information: Public file; LMS
- Webcast: Listen Live
- Website: www.raccoonvalleyradio.com

KKRF (107.9 FM) is a commercial radio station that serves the Stuart, Iowa area. The station broadcasts a Real Country format.

Until January 31, 2012, KKRF was licensed to Coon Valley Communications, Inc which was owned by Patrick Delaney who also owned KDLS (AM) in Perry, Iowa and KGRA in Jefferson, Iowa.

On February 1, 2012, Patrick Delany of Perry, owner of Coon Valley Communications, Inc, sold his company to Mel Suhr of Knoxville, owner of M&M Broadcasting, Inc.

With an agreement reached on January 27, 2012, and having an effective purchase date of February 1, 2012, M&M Broadcasting, Inc, a subsidiary of M and H Broadcasting, Inc, purchased Coon Valley Communications. M and H Broadcasting, Inc is owned by Mel and Holly Suhr of Knoxville, Iowa. M and H Broadcasting, Inc also owns KRLS 92.1 FM and KNIA 1320 AM at Knoxville. They also own Home Broadcasting, Inc which owns KCII 1380 AM and KCII-FM 106.1 FM at Washington.

On August 1, 2025, John and Jen McGee of McGee Management Services became owners of Raccoon Valley Radio (RVR). In 2012, when Mel and Holly Suhr of M & H Broadcasting purchased what later became Raccoon Valley Radio, John McGee was named the general manager and Jen McGee became the traffic director. Raccoon Valley Radio includes all three stations: KDLS in Perry, KGRA in Jefferson and KKRF in Stuart.

The station was originally licensed as KAGD on October 21, 1992, but changed callsigns to KKRF on July 1, 1993.

The transmitter and broadcast tower are located northeast of the intersection of 130th St. & Lewis Ave. in Adair County, 3.4 miles southeast of Casey, Iowa. According to the Antenna Structure Registration database, the tower is 134.1 m (440 ft) tall with the FM broadcast antenna mounted at the 125 m (410 ft) level. The calculated Height Above Average Terrain is 150 m (492 ft).
