= KDLS =

KDLS may refer to:

- The ICAO code for Columbia Gorge Regional Airport
- KDLS (AM), a radio station (1310 AM) licensed to Perry, Iowa, United States
- KDLS-FM, a radio station (105.5 FM) licensed to Perry, Iowa, United States
