= KDLX (AM) =

- Des Moines, Iowa; United States
- Broadcast area: Central Iowa
- Frequency: 1150 kHz
- Branding: La Ley

Programming
- Format: Regional Mexican

Ownership
- Owner: Latin World Broadcasting

History
- First air date: 1948
- Former call signs: KWDM (1948–1959) KWKY (1959–2025)

Technical information
- Licensing authority: FCC
- Facility ID: 49099
- Class: B
- Power: 2,500 watts day; 1,000 watts night
- Transmitter coordinates: 41°27′9″N 93°40′52.8″W
- Translator: 94.5 K233BT (Des Moines)

Links
- Public license information: Public file; LMS
- Webcast: listen live
- Website: www.laleyiowa.com

KDLX (1150 kHz) is an AM radio station licensed to Des Moines, Iowa. The station broadcasts a Regional Mexican format branded as "La Ley 1150".

== History ==
=== KWDM ===
The station signed on the airwaves as KWDM in 1948. The station was part of a trio of new stations that signed on that year in Des Moines including KIOA (now KPSZ) and KCBC (later KKSO, the forerunner of KBGG). The owner of KWDM was George Webber, who set up studios at 407 Fifth Avenue. Webber had an extensive musical library and KWDM was known for its eclectic mix of international music not heard elsewhere in Des Moines. The call sign stood for "Webber and Des Moines".

The station was never a huge ratings success, but had a devoted and loyal following of people who enjoyed their programming. In 1959 Webber sold the station to the 3M Corporation. He would later bring KWDM back on the air in 1964 as an FM station, at 93.3 MHz (now KIOA).

=== Top 40 KWKY ===
Once 3M completed its purchase of KWDM, they switched the call sign to KWKY. The station began 48 hours of stunting by playing Earl Brown's novelty record Pachalafaka for two days with a countdown to "Quickie" and the legal ID of "KWDM Des Moines" inserted in between the song. KWKY station management also attempted to purchase commercial time on KSO and KIOA to announce that "Quickie is coming." Once the stunting was done, KWKY was introduced as "Quickie 1150" with a new Top 40 format.

Going up against two well established Top 40 stations with much stronger signals larger coverage areas was not a successful decision. In 1960, KWKY adopted a middle of the road format similar to KCBC. In 1961, KWKY tried a Top 40 format again with similar results to the first attempt.

=== Country music ===
In 1962, the format was again changed, this time to country music. This marked the fifth format change in three years. It was with this format that KWKY would reach its highest levels of ratings success. KWKY dominated the country market for the next ten years, as the only full time AM country station in Des Moines.

The decline of KWKY started in 1972 when KSO switched from Top 40 to country music. With KSO's higher power and better coverage area, KWKY's complicated directional antenna pattern hurt it in the ratings. KWKY tried to compete for the next four years, but in the end, 3M decided to sell the station to the Putbrese family in 1976.

=== Christian radio ===
Logo when the station aired Catholic Radio

After the Putbrese family purchased KWKY, the format was switched to an Evangelical Christian talk and teaching format along with some high school sports. KWKY became a brokered-time station, with national and local religious leaders buying segments of time on the station, during which they could ask listeners for financial support for their ministries.

A fire in 1977 caused $70,000 worth of damages to KWKY's Norwalk studios. After 30 years of Evangelical Christian programming, a local group of Catholic business and religious leaders purchased the station through a non-profit corporation, St. Gabriel Communications. While the station still broadcasts religious programming, it is targeted towards Catholic listeners.

=== Regional Mexican ===
In 2024, Saint Gabriel Communications reached an agreement to sell the station to Latin Broadcasting. This transaction marked the end of the station’s long tenure as a religious broadcaster in the Des Moines market. The sale was finalized following approval from the Federal Communications Commission, with the purchase price for the 1150 AM frequency and its associated assets reported at $350,000. Immediately following the transfer of control, the new owners changed the station's call sign from KWKY to KDLX and launched a Regional Mexican format branded as "La Ley 1150." Religious programming was moved to KIHS 105.5 FM in Perry, Iowa, and KQBV 88.5 in Adel, Iowa. As part of the 2024 acquisition, Latin Broadcasting retained the license for the station's FM translator, K233CG, which broadcasts on 94.5 MHz.
