= KPSZ =

Radio station in Des Moines, Iowa

Coordinates: 41°28′35″N 93°22′26″W

- Des Moines, Iowa; United States
- Broadcast area: Des Moines metropolitan area
- Frequency: 940 kHz
- Branding: Hope 940

Programming
- Format: Christian talk and teaching
- Affiliations: Singing News Radio; Iowa Cubs

Ownership
- Owner: Saga Communications; (Saga Communications of Iowa, LLC)
- Sister stations: KAZR; KIOA; KOEZ; KRNT; KSTZ

History
- First air date: January 15, 1948 (as KIOA)
- Former call signs: KIOA (1948–1996); KXTK (1996–2002)
- Call sign meaning: "Praise"

Technical information
- Licensing authority: FCC
- Facility ID: 58533
- Class: B
- Power: 10,000 watts day; 5,000 watts night

Links
- Public license information: Public file; LMS
- Webcast: Listen Live
- Website: iowashope.com

KPSZ (940 AM, "Hope 940") is a commercial radio station in Des Moines, Iowa, United States. The station is owned by Saga Communications, and operates as part of its Des Moines Radio Group. KPSZ's studios and offices are located on Locust Street in Des Moines along with Saga's other local stations (KRNT, KSTZ, KIOA, KOEZ and KAZR). KPSZ broadcasts a Christian talk and teaching radio format. National religious leaders heard on KPSZ include Adrian Rogers, David Jeremiah, Joyce Meyer and Jim Daly. Using a brokered programming model, hosts buy blocks of time on KPSZ and may use their shows to seek donations to their ministries.

KPSZ is powered at 10,000 watts by day and 5,000 watts at night. It uses a directional antenna with a six-tower array to protect other stations on 940 AM, a Canadian and Mexican clear channel frequency. The transmitter is on 228th Avenue at Carpenter Street in Hartford.

== History ==
=== KIOA: 1948–1957 ===
On January 15, 1948, the station signed on as KIOA. Its studios were located in the Onthank building at 10th and Mulberry in downtown Des Moines. The transmitter and towers are located two miles northeast of Hartford, Iowa. The owners of KIOA, the Independent Broadcasting Company, were also issued an FM construction permit for 93.7 FM, but the station was never put on the air.

KIOA was an independent station in its early years, not affiliated with any large radio network. This was a risky format in the post war era when network dramas, comedies, soap operas and game shows were very popular. KIOA stayed competitive with the "big three" (WHO, KRNT, and KSO), in the Des Moines market and waged a spirited battle with its main competitor in the MOR format, KCBC. Also during this era, KIOA competed with WHO for the television license on channel 13. Palmer Broadcasting and WHO would be granted the license for what became WHO-TV.

=== Top 40 era: 1957–1962 ===
The first two major changes to KIOA since its birth came in 1957. In March the station moved its studios and offices out of the Onthank Building and into the old Tromar Ballroom at the corner of 5th and Park in downtown Des Moines. The second change that year would be one that would change the face of radio in Des Moines for the next 25 years.

On May 1, 1957, KIOA became the first Top 40 station in the Des Moines area. The station was a hit overnight, shooting straight to the top of the Hoopers ratings. Within a year, KIOA would be joined by KSO and KWKY in the Top 40 arena. Even with competition, KIOA stayed on top, consistently beating out KSO and KWKY would change formats a few times before settling on a country music format.

=== Station fire ===
During 1962, KIOA saw a ratings decline, as KSO was starting to cut in on KIOA's lead. This was due to some recent turnover of disk jockeys at KIOA as well as the excellent programming of Dick Vance. The final straw that pushed KIOA under KSO was when KIOA's studios burnt to the ground on February 26, 1963. By Noon that day, the station was up and running again from the transmitter site near Hartford.

The studios remained in Hartford until a new facility could be constructed at 803 Keosauqua Way in downtown Des Moines. This was the location of the "KIOA Fishbowl", where the DJs would broadcast in front of a plate glass window looking out at the city. This was similar to KSO's studios at 1910 Ingersoll Avenue.

=== Top 40 era: 1964–1974 ===
By 1964, KIOA had settled down into its new studios and was under the leadership of program director Peter McLane, who led the station until 1977. KIOA surged back into its spot on top of the ratings. Shortly thereafter, KSO switched to a MOR format and the only competition for KIOA would be KDMI on the FM band. In 1968, KDMI left the Top 40 market, but KSO came back to compete with KIOA.

In 1972, two major changes would happen within the KIOA camp. In January the studios and offices were moved again down the street to 215 Keosauqua Way in downtown Des Moines. The second change was the acquisition of KYNA at 93.3 FM. There was discussion of moving the top 40 programming to the FM and turning KIOA into a country station, but in the end, the AM stayed the same and the FM became an oldies station. This was due in part to KSO switching to a country station and KIOA once again not having any rivals in the top 40 market.

=== Decline of AM Top 40 ===
By 1974, there was another new competitor in the market, KGGO, known as "GO 95". This station was put on FM by Stoner Broadcasting, owners of KSO, and was the first serious threat to KIOA since 1964.

With FM radios becoming more common and the superior sound quality of FM stereo, top 40 radio was one of the first casualties on the AM band. KIOA tried to stay competitive, but with Stauffer Communications' KRNQ coming on air with a top 40 format as well, it was apparent that a change needed to be made soon.

=== Adult contemporary: 1976–1986 ===
In 1976, the decision was made to move the top 40 format to FM as KMGK and for KIOA to switch to an adult contemporary format. KIOA fell to the middle of the pack as far as ratings went and some long term personalities left or took jobs off the air with the station.

The station was stagnant and looking for its niche, when in 1984, Dic Youngs, a former on-air personality and currently a time salesman who had been with the station since 1966, started hosting the "Saturday Night Oldies Party". This feature became a hit immediately and helped to set the station in the right direction, and ran on KIOA through September 2007, when the show and Youngs moved to sister station KRNT.

=== Oldies era: 1986–1996 ===
Due to the success of the "Saturday Night Oldies Party", the format was changed to oldies on a full-time basis in 1986. As part of the flip, KIOA began utilizing many of its jingles used during the station's original Top 40 run.

The lone challenge to KIOA's dominance of the oldies market was from KFMG, which attempted to compete with KIOA from 1988 to 1992. KIOA counteracted this by having KDWZ switch to KIOA-FM and simulcasting the oldies format on FM. In 1988, KIOA moved into newly constructed studios at 5161 Maple Drive in Pleasant Hill, Iowa. In 1993, the station was purchased by Saga Communications and moved to its present location at 1416 Locust Street in downtown Des Moines.

=== KXTK: 1996–2002 ===
On December 16, 1996, the station had its first call letter change ever, changing to KXTK, leaving KIOA and oldies programming to KIOA-FM exclusively. The new station was known as "Talk 940" and featured nationally syndicated talk shows with no local news or programming. The station never took off, and in February 1999, it went back to simulcasting KIOA except for the morning drive time, which featured Don Imus, syndicated from New York City. By the end of the year, Imus was dropped from the station. In February 2000, KXTK began adding some sports radio programming in certain dayparts.

In October 2000, Michael Gartner, the owner of the Iowa Cubs, reached a lease agreement with Saga Communications to lease the station. The station retained the KXTK calls, but was now known as "Sports 940, The Big Ticket". During this time the studios were located at Sec Taylor Stadium at 350 SW 1st Street in Des Moines. "The Big Ticket" carried Sporting News Radio network programs, local talk shows with personalities such as Larry Morgan and Steve Deace, and I-Cubs, Drake Bulldogs, and Nebraska Cornhuskers games. During this time, the station had competition from KXNO and KJJC. Des Moines proved to be too small a market for three sports stations, and KXTK was the first casualty. This ended the lease arrangement, and Saga Communications took control of the station again on September 3, 2002.

=== Praise 940/Hope 940 ===
On September 3, 2002, the station flipped to Christian radio programming as KPSZ, "Praise 940". It has a format of both national syndicated and locally produced religious talk along with Christian music. In August 2020, KPSZ rebranded as "Hope 940", retaining the same format and call letters.

== Personalities and programming ==
KPSZ airs local and national Christian leaders. In its early years, KPSZ had a block of locally programmed Christian music from 3-7 p.m. weekdays, hosted by Doug Griffin. That was later replaced with Christian talk and teaching shows.

On weekend, KPSZ airs Don Thompson's "Music and Memories," as well as "That Good Ole Gospel Sound". Late nights, KPSZ carries programming from Singing News Radio, a Southern gospel music and talk network.

KPSZ also airs broadcasts minor league baseball games of the Iowa Cubs of the Pacific Coast League. KPSZ carries some Drake University women's basketball games when co-owned sports radio station KRNT is airing another sporting event at the same time.
