= KGRA =

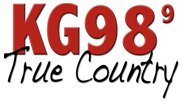
- Jefferson, Iowa; United States
- Frequency: 98.9 (MHz)
- Branding: KG 989

Programming
- Format: Classic Country

Ownership
- Owner: M&M Broadcasting, Inc
- Sister stations: KDLS, KKRF

History
- Former call signs: KLSN (1988–1994)

Technical information
- Licensing authority: FCC
- Facility ID: 6685
- Class: C3
- ERP: 11,000 watts
- HAAT: 152 m (499 ft)
- Transmitter coordinates: 41°58′54″N 94°31′12″W

Links
- Public license information: Public file; LMS
- Website: http://www.raccoonvalleyradio.com

KGRA (98.9 FM) is a commercial radio station that serves the Jefferson, Iowa area. Formerly broadcasting a Classic Hits format, the station now broadcasts Real Country.

Until January 31, 2012, KGRA was licensed to Coon Valley Communications, Inc which was owned by Patrick Delaney who also owned KDLS (AM) in Perry, Iowa and KKRF in Stuart, Iowa.

On February 1, 2012, Patrick Delany of Perry, owner of Coon Valley Communications, Inc, sold his company to Mel Suhr of Knoxville, owner of M&M Broadcasting, Inc.

With an agreement reached on January 27, 2012, and having an effective purchase date of February 1, 2012, M&M Broadcasting, Inc, a subsidiary of M and H Broadcasting, Inc, purchased Coon Valley Communications. M and H Broadcasting, Inc is owned by Mel and Holly Suhr of Knoxville, Iowa. M and H Broadcasting, Inc also owns KRLS 92.1 FM and KNIA 1320 AM at Knoxville. They also own Home Broadcasting, Inc which owns KCII 1380 AM and KCII-FM 106.1 FM at Washington.

On August 1, 2025, John and Jen McGee of McGee Management Services became owners of Raccoon Valley Radio (RVR). In 2012, when Mel and Holly Suhr of M & H Broadcasting purchased what later became Raccoon Valley Radio, John McGee was named the general manager and Jen McGee became the traffic director. Raccoon Valley Radio includes all three stations: KDLS in Perry, KGRA in Jefferson and KKRF in Stuart.

The station was originally licensed as KLSN on November 10, 1988, but changed callsigns to KGRA on February 4, 1994.

The transmitter and broadcast tower are located 8 miles west of Jefferson near Scranton, Iowa. According to the Antenna Structure Registration database, the tower is 146 m (479 ft) tall with the FM broadcast antenna mounted at the 142 m (466 ft) level. The calculated Height Above Average Terrain is 152 m (499 ft). The distance between KGRA and KKRF, its other "True Country" station is approximately 44 miles.
