= KRUU =

KRUU may refer to:

- KRUU-LP, a defunct low-power radio station (100.1 FM) that was licensed to serve Fairfield, Iowa
- KWQW, a radio station (98.3 FM) licensed to serve Boone, Iowa, which held the call sign KRUU from 1993 to 1996
