= KDLS (AM) =

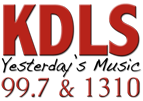
- Perry, Iowa; United States
- Broadcast area: Adel, Iowa; Jefferson, Iowa; Madrid, Iowa
- Frequency: 1310 kHz
- Branding: KDLS 99.7 & 1310

Programming
- Format: Adult contemporary
- Affiliations: ABC News Radio

Ownership
- Owner: M&M Broadcasting, Inc.
- Sister stations: KGRA; KKRF

History
- First air date: 1961

Technical information
- Licensing authority: FCC
- Facility ID: 52314
- Class: B
- Power: 500 watts day; 300 watts night
- Transmitter coordinates: 41°49′57.9″N 94°2′15.8″W
- Translators: 94.3 K232FX (Granger); 99.7 K259AT (Boone)

Links
- Public license information: Public file; LMS
- Webcast: Listen live
- Website: raccoonvalleyradio.com

KDLS (1310 kHz) is a commercial AM radio station in Perry, Iowa. It is owned by M&M Broadcasting and broadcasts an adult contemporary format. Although both stations share the same call letters, KDLS AM does not have the same ownership as KDLS-FM.

The KDLS antenna system uses three towers arranged in a directional array that concentrates the signal toward the west. The towers are located east of Perry near the intersection of U.S. Route 169 and Iowa Highway 141.

== History ==
KDLS first began broadcasting in 1961. For several decades, the station was licensed to Coon Valley Communications, Inc., which was owned by Perry resident Patrick Delaney.

Until February 2010, KDLS broadcast Timeless Favorites. After the shutdown of Timeless Favorites, the station broadcast primarily the Kool Gold network.

Until January 31, 2012, KDLS was licensed to Coon Valley Communications, Inc. Coon Valley Communications also owned KGRA (98.9 FM) in Jefferson and KKRF (107.9 FM) in Stuart. Coon Valley Communications was owned by Patrick Delaney of Perry.

On February 1, 2012, Patrick Delany, owner of Coon Valley Communications, Inc, sold his company to M&M Broadcasting, Inc. M&M is a subsidiary of M and H Broadcasting, Inc, owned by Mel and Holly Suhr of Knoxville, Iowa. M and H also owns KRLS (92.1 FM) and KNIA (1320 AM) at Knoxville. They also own Home Broadcasting, Inc which owns KCII (1380 AM) and KCII-FM (106.1) at Washington. On August 1, 2025, John and Jen McGee of McGee Management Services became owners of Raccoon Valley Radio (RVR). In 2012, when Mel and Holly Suhr of M & H Broadcasting purchased what later became Raccoon Valley Radio, John McGee was named the general manager and Jen McGee became the traffic director. Raccoon Valley Radio includes all three stations: KDLS in Perry, KGRA in Jefferson and KKRF in Stuart.
