= KRLS =

KRLS may refer to:

- KRLS (FM), a radio station (92.1 FM) licensed to serve Knoxville, Iowa, United States
- Kinchafoonee Regional Library System
