= KGRA-FM =

KGRA-FM may refer to:

- KGRA, a radio station in Jefferson, Iowa
- The call letters for FM Frequency 103.7 KGRA also known as Nova 104 broadcasting from 1976 to 1981 out of Lake Charles, Louisiana
- a former call sign of KBIU, a radio station in Lake Charles, Louisiana
