= KCII =

KCII may refer to:

- KCII (AM), a radio station (1380 AM) licensed to Washington, Iowa, United States
- KCII-FM, a radio station (106.1 FM) licensed to Washington, Iowa, United States
- Choteau Airport (ICAO code KCII)
