= Edith Baumann (artist) =

American artist

- Born: 1948 (age 77–78); Ames, Iowa
- Education: University of California, Los Angeles (BFA); University of Southern California (MFA)
- Style: Abstract art

Edith Baumann is an abstract artist based in Santa Monica, California. Her paintings are minimalist and include geometric repetition and patterns, often presented in intense colors.

== Biography ==
Baumann was born in Ames, Iowa in 1948. She received her BFA from the University of California, Los Angeles in 1975 and an MFA from the University of Southern California in 1985. Throughout her career, Baumann has created several series of paintings, including "Bar Paintings", "Spiral Paintings", and "Randomness and Structure Paintings"] Her most recent, are raw pigment acrylic paintings on canvas.

Baumann's work has been featured in many solo and group exhibitions, including in 2018 an exhibition at the Charlotte Jackson Fine Art Gallery in Santa Fe.

In 2014 Baumann was interviewed by Joan Quinn on “The Joan Quinn Profiles” on DoubleGTV

Baumann's work is in the public collection of the Los Angeles County Museum of Art (LACMA).

== Exhibitions ==
=== Solo exhibitions ===
- 1985 Lindhurst Gallery, University of Southern California, Los Angeles, CA.
- 1987 Newspace, Los Angeles, CA.
- 1988 Newspace, Los Angeles, CA.
- 1989 Rena Bransten Gallery, San Francisco, CA.
- 1990 Modernism, San Francisco, CA.
- 1990 Newspace, Los Angeles, CA.
- 1993 Beatrix Wilhem Gallery, Stuttgart, Germany (catalog).
- 2005 M&W Art Ltd, Hong Kong, China
- 2010 Pete and Susan Barrett Art Gallery, Santa Monica, CA.
- 2011 Modernism, San Francisco, CA.
- 2012 Katherine Cone Gallery, Culver City, CA.
- 2018 parrasch heijnen, Los Angeles, CA.
- 2020 parrasch heijnen, Los Angeles, CA.
- 2023 Franklin Parrasch Gallery, New York, NY.

=== Select group exhibitions ===
- 1980 Abstract Painting 1980, Los Angeles Institute of Contemporary Art, CA. (catalog).
- 1987 Los Angeles Artists: Modern Masters, Ruthven Gallery, Lancaster, Ohio.
- 1988 After Abstract, Art Center College, Pasadena, CA. (catalog)
- 1989 Abstract Options, University Art Museum, Univ. of CA, Santa Barbara, CA, (catalog).
- 1991 A Night of Celebration, Laguna Art Museum, Laguna Beach, CA, Nov.
- 1992 Intimate Universe, Michael Walls Gallery, New York, NY, September.
- 1993 The Shape of Things to Come, Laguna Art Museum, Laguna Beach, CA, Nov.
- 2008 About Abstraction, Chapman Univ. Guggenheim Gallery, Orange, CA. July.
- 2010 Wall to Wall, Daniel Weinberg Gallery, Los Angeles, CA, June 5-Aug. 14.
- 2010 The Shape of Space, 222 Shelby St. Gallery, Santa Fe, NM, June 11-July 31.
- 2011 Marks and Movement: 5 Painters, Barrett Art Gallery, Santa Monica, CA, Oct. 22-Dec. 3 (catalog).
- 2011 Skin Freaks, Inman Gallery Annex, Houston, TX, May 20-June 25.
- 2011 What’s New, Pussycat?, The Torrance Art Museum, Torrance, CA, Jan. 22-Mar. 5
- 2012 Pink, Charlotte Jackson Fine Art, Santa Fe, NM, April 3–24.
- 2012 California Abstract Painting, 1952-2011, Woodbury University, Burbank, CA, Jan. 21-Mar. 4.
- 2013 7 Magnifici Anni, Art 1307, Napoli, Italy, Nov. 28 - April 6, 2014.

=== Public collections ===
- Los Angeles County Museum of Art (LACMA)
