= KOEZ (FM) =

Radio station in Ames, Iowa

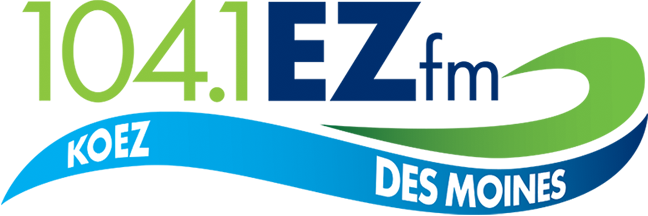
- Ames, Iowa; United States
- Broadcast area: Des Moines metropolitan area
- Frequency: 104.1 MHz (HD Radio)
- Branding: 104.1 EZ FM

Programming
- Format: Soft adult contemporary

Ownership
- Owner: Saga Communications; (Saga Communications of Iowa, LLC)
- Sister stations: KAZR; KIOA; KPSZ; KRNT; KSTZ

History
- First air date: June 2, 1967
- Former call signs: KLFM (1967–1981); KEZT (1981–1997); KLTI-FM (1997–2014); KMYR (2014–2019)

Technical information
- Licensing authority: FCC
- Facility ID: 7823
- Class: C0
- ERP: 100,000 watts
- HAAT: 308 meters (1,010 ft)
- Transmitter coordinates: 41°54′9″N 93°54′15″W

Links
- Public license information: Public file; LMS
- Webcast: Listen live
- Website: 1041ezfm.com

KOEZ (104.1 FM) is a commercial radio station licensed to Ames, Iowa, United States, serving the Des Moines metropolitan area with a soft adult contemporary format. The station is owned by Saga Communications, and operates as part of its Des Moines Radio Group.

KOEZ's studios are on Locust Street in Des Moines, while its transmitter is located near Woodward.

== History ==
The station signed on the air on June 2, 1967, as KLFM. It was owned by Paul D. Lunde and was branded as "KLFM Stereo - Ames; Central Iowa's first 24-hour FM station." It aired a beautiful music format with ABC FM Radio Network news at 15 minutes after the hour.

Robert and Norma Bunce were the owners of Bunce Broadcasting Corporation. Robert started his broadcasting career as a disc jockey with KCBC and later bought the station in 1968. Robert sold KCBC in 1975, and then purchased KLFM in Ames.

In 1981, it became KEZT with a contemporary easy listening format programmed by KalaMusic. A new 1,000 foot tall tower was constructed, and KEZT-FM became one of the top rated Arbitron stations in Des Moines. In 1995, KEZT rebranded as "Lite 104.1", and shifted to a soft adult contemporary format.

In October 1996, the station was purchased by current owner Saga Communications, changed call letters to KLTI, and relocated studios to their current location at 1416 Locust Street in Des Moines.

On March 3, 2014, the station rebranded as "More 104", and moved away from Soft AC to a more upbeat adult contemporary format. The call sign was changed to KMYR. After the Christmas season in 2017, KMYR adjusted back to soft AC and rebranded slightly to "More 104.1."

On September 30, 2019, KMYR changed call letters to KOEZ. On October 18, after stunting through the 17th with all-Elton John music (as an eventually-postponed June 2020 concert during his Farewell Yellow Brick Road Tour, to be held at Wells Fargo Arena, had been announced that day), the station rebranded as “104.1 EZ FM”.

== Christmas music ==
Each holiday season since 1998, KOEZ drops its regular music format and plays Christmas music for several weeks leading up to Christmas Day. The station traditionally flips to Christmas music prior to Thanksgiving. Additionally, some years KOEZ flips to Christmas music for just one weekend in late July, as a part of their Christmas in July programming. Currently, KOEZ is the only commercially licensed non-religious station in the Des Moines market to devote its entire playlist to the holiday format.

Other stations in the Des Moines market attempted to compete with KOEZ in playing the Christmas format. KPTL (now KXNO-FM) in 2013 and KMXD (now KDRB) in 2004, both owned by Clear Channel Communications (now iHeartMedia) flipped to all-Christmas music for a single year but did not continue in subsequent years.

== Logos ==
Former logo of KLTI "Lite 104.1"

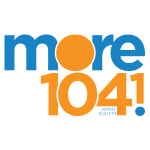
Former logo of KMYR "More 104.1"
