= North Grand Mall =

- Location: Ames, Iowa, United States
- Coordinates: 42.048°N 93.622°W
- Address: 2801 Grand Avenue
- Opened: 1971
- Developer: General Growth Properties
- Owner: NGM Property Management
- Floor area: 340,000 sq ft (32,000 m^{2})
- Floors: 1
- Public transit: CyRide
- Website: northgrandmall.com

North Grand Mall is a 340,000-square-foot (32,000 m^{2}) shopping center serving the city of Ames, Iowa. In 2006, plans were announced for a $30 million renovation and expansion. In 2004, a farmers' market operated at the mall. The mall's anchor stores are Kohl's, Shoe Carnival, North Grand Cinema, and JCPenney, with the space previously occupied by Younkers now the location of Planet Fitness. Sears announced its closure in late 2008. The Sears building was torn down, with Kohl's, a TJ Maxx, and Shoe Carnival opening on its site.

In 2017, owners GK Development sold the mall to a trio of investors.
