= KAZR =

Radio station in Pella, Iowa

Coordinates: 41.5383°N 93.2996°W

- Pella, Iowa; United States
- Broadcast area: Des Moines metropolitan area
- Frequency: 103.3 MHz (HD Radio)
- Branding: Lazer 103.3

Programming
- Format: Mainstream rock
- Subchannels: HD2: Pure Oldies 104.5 (Oldies)

Ownership
- Owner: Saga Communications; (Saga Communications of Iowa, LLC)
- Sister stations: KIOA; KOEZ; KPSZ; KRNT; KSTZ

History
- First air date: 1976 (as KPLL)
- Former call signs: KPLL (1976–1980); KXJX (1980–1986); KFMD (1986–1988); KDMG (1988–1992); KFMG (1992–1996)
- Call sign meaning: "Lazer"

Technical information
- Licensing authority: FCC
- Facility ID: 28882
- Class: C1
- ERP: 100,000 watts
- HAAT: 227 meters (745 ft)
- Translator: (104.5 K283CC) Des Moines (HD2)

Links
- Public license information: Public file; LMS
- Webcast: Listen Live; Listen Live (HD2)
- Website: lazer1033.com oldies1045.com (HD2)

KAZR (103.3 MHz) is a commercial FM radio station licensed to Pella, Iowa, United States, and serving the Des Moines metropolitan area. It is owned by Saga Communications, and is operated as part of its Des Moines Radio Group, with studios located on Locust Street in Des Moines. KAZR airs a mainstream rock radio format, known as "Lazer 103.3".

The transmitter is located off Pinion Avenue near Runnells, broadcasting at 100,000 watts. KAZR broadcasts in the HD Radio format.

== History ==
The station signed on as KPLL in 1976, with studios and transmitter located in Otley, near Pella. It was owned by the Meyer family with a varied format of music and religious programming. In 1980, its call letters changed to KXJX, in April 1986 to KFMD, and to KDMG in June 1988. KDMG, owned by Beta Broadcasting, had a gold-based adult contemporary format until September 1988, when it flipped to oldies.

On February 4, 1991, KDMG flipped to an adult album alternative (AAA) format with the slogan "Where The Music Comes First", similar to WXRT in Chicago and KBCO in Denver. It became KFMG in April 1992. During the era of 1990–1996, night times tended to be harder-edged, following an alternative/modern rock/new rock format in the daytime. KFMG's format consisted of modern/alternative rock, blues, and variety shows such as "The Grateful Dead Hour". In the early 1970s, owner and program director Ron Sorenson had operated a station with those call letters on 94.9 FM, now KGGO.

On August 1, 1996, KFMG flipped to active rock as KAZR, "Lazer 103.3", after Sorenson sold the station to Saga Communications.

== Lazerfest ==
In August 2002, KAZR created and organized a music festival known as Lazerfest. The inaugural festival took place in Water Works Park, but subsequently moved to the Indianola Balloon Grounds in Indianola, Iowa, in 2003. In 2012 Lazerfest moved to its new home at the Central Iowa Expo in Boone, Iowa. Lazerfest 2010 was the first Lazerfest to completely sell out, with 25,000 tickets sold.

== KAZR-HD2 ==
KAZR HD2 logo

KAZR's HD2 sub-channel currently airs an oldies format as "Pure Oldies 104.5", which is relayed on a 250-watt translator station 104.5 K283CC in Des Moines.

The translator signed on in August 2014, and initially carried a simulcast of sister KPSZ. In September 2015, after sister KRNT dropped its longtime standards format for sports talk, the format moved to the translator/KAZR-HD2 as "Legends 104.5." In August 2016, K283CC/KAZR-HD2 flipped to a conservative talk format as "Talk 104.5." In March 2017, K283CC/KAZR-HD2 flipped to the current oldies format.

== KAZR-HD3 ==
On April 1, 2021, KAZR launched a contemporary Christian format on its HD3 subchannel, branded as "Joy 102.1" (which is simulcast on translator K271CO (102.1 FM)). On September 20, 2021, KAZR-HD3/K271CO dropped the Christian format, with K271CO flipping back to a simulcast of KRNT.
