= Mary Greeley Medical Center =

Coordinates: 42.032°N 93.612°W

Mary Greeley Medical Center is a 220-bed regional medical center in Ames, Iowa. The medical center services residents of a 14-county region in central Iowa, including a six-county primary market of Story, Boone, Greene, Hamilton, Hardin and Marshall counties. Mary Greeley offers a variety of inpatient and outpatient services, including cancer, cardiac care, mental health, obstetrics, orthopedics, home health, hospice care, emergency services, surgical services, stroke care, and diabetic care.

The medical center is affiliated with a variety of area healthcare providers, including McFarland Clinic, a physician-owned clinic serving communities throughout central Iowa.

Although city-owned, Mary Greeley is self-sufficient and receives no public funds for ongoing operations. It is governed by a five-member elected Board of Trustees.

With approximately 1,400 employees, Mary Greeley is one of the largest employers in Story County.

== History ==
Mary Greeley Memorial Hospital was built by Capt. Wallace Greeley and given to the city of Ames, Iowa, in memory of his late wife, Mary (Young) Greeley. A former Civil War officer on the Union side, Capt. Greeley was a highly successful businessman in Ames, and had a variety of public service roles, including mayor of Ames and three terms in the Iowa Legislature. He and Mary also helped establish the Ames Public Library, which stills stands on land donated by the couple. Mary, a shy woman and a talented artist, was a member of the library board.

The hospital, which cost $80,000 to build, was dedicated on Sept. 24, 1916. At the dedication, Capt. Greeley said, “It affords me great pleasure, more than words can express, that I contribute something towards the welfare of not only those now in need, but also for those who will be here long after we have passed away." The hospital began treating patients on Dec. 28, 1916. According to newspaper accounts, the hospital's first patient was an Iowa State veterinary medicine student from Villisca, Iowa. In its first two weeks, 27 people were treated at Mary Greeley.

The original building has since been demolished, but the modern and significantly expanded medical center still stands on the original location on the east side of Douglas Avenue between 11th and 12th streets in Ames.

== Awards ==
2019: Malcolm Baldrige National Quality Award for Performance Excellence.
