= Lazerfest =

Coordinates: 41°36′44.5″N 93°45′29.6″W

- Locations: Des Moines, Iowa (2002-2003, 2007-2011, 2014-2015); Boone, Iowa (2012-2013)
- Years active: 2002–2003, 2007–2015

Lazerfest was a music festival, created by the Lazer 103.3 radio station in Des Moines, Iowa. The festival featured rock artists such as Five Finger Death Punch, Halestorm, Falling In Reverse, Young Guns, Devour The Day, and We Are Harlot. The 2015 festival was held Friday, May 8 and Sunday, May 10, 2015, at the 7 Flags Event Center in Clive, Iowa. The festival was discontinued after that.

== History ==
The inaugural Lazerfest music festival was held on Sunday, August 18, 2002, at Waterworks Park in Des Moines, Iowa. The show featured a main stage with artists such as P.O.D., Rob Zombie (with an unexpected guest appearance by Zakk Wylde), Stone Sour, Adema, Lostprophets, Van Halen tribute band "The Atomic Punks" and up-and-coming local band Index Case. Originally, Drowning Pool were also scheduled to appear, but just four days before Lazerfest, frontman Dave Williams died unexpectedly. There was also a second stage primarily featuring baby bands and a couple of locals, but headlined by Hatebreed. A relatively unknown Seether were one of the six second stage acts at the original Lazerfest.

The 2nd annual Lazerfest music festival was held on Saturday, July 26, 2003, at the Memorial Balloon Field in Indianola, Iowa. Again, a two-stage set-up with Staind, Static-X, Powerman 5000, Adema, Ra, Lo-Pro, DoubleDrive and Guns N' Roses tribute band "Night Train" appearing on the main stage. National act Spineshank headlined the second stage, which otherwise featured local Central Iowa-area bands. Slipknot and Stone Sour frontman Corey Taylor was the special celebrity emcee of the event.

No Lazerfests were held between the years of 2004 and 2006. During those three years, the only summer festival hosted by Lazer 103.3 was "Waterstock Rock," which primarily featured 80s hard rock and heavy metal bands.

The return of the Lazerfest music festival was held May 13, 2007 at the Indianola Balloon Grounds. It featured seven popular artists performing at the main stage, including Hinder, Buckcherry, Papa Roach, Saliva, Fuel, Bullet For My Valentine and Operator. Eight small, less popular artists were featured at the second stage, including National acts Smile Empty Soul and The Exies.

2008 was the first and only year there were two Lazerfests. The first was held on Wednesday, May 21 at Waterworks Park in Des Moines, Iowa. Kid Rock headlined with Theory of a Deadman and Finger Eleven as the opening acts. This is the only example of a Lazerfest being held during the week. Lazerfest "Version 2.0" was held on Saturday, July 5 at the Indianola Balloon Grounds in Indianola, Iowa, and was more of a traditional Lazerfest set-up with a main stage featuring artists such as Stone Temple Pilots, Staind, Hinder, Filter, Five Finger Death Punch and Drowning Pool. A second stage featured a mix of lesser-known National acts and locals.

Attendance continued to grow in 2009, with ten bands featured on one stage at the Indianola Balloon Grounds in Indianola, Iowa on Sunday, May 31, including Korn, Buckcherry, Junk Beer Kidnap Band featuring Slipknot and Stone Sour frontman Corey Taylor, Saving Abel, Saliva, Loaded featuring former Guns N' Roses bassist Duff McKagan, Rev Theory, Halestorm, The Veer Union and Des Moines' own Destrophy.

Lazerfest 2010 was the first Lazerfest to sell out the Indianola Balloon Grounds in Indianola, Iowa on Sunday, May 16, selling 25,000 tickets on the strength of the lineup, which was featured on two full-sized stages. On one stage, Godsmack, Rob Zombie, Hellyeah, Five Finger Death Punch, Halestorm, Drowning Pool, Violent Soho and local band Mindrite. And on the other, Three Days Grace, Alice Cooper, Seether, Papa Roach, Skillet, Red, New Medicine and local band Dead Horse Trauma.

Lazerfest 2011 took place on Sunday, May 15 at the Indianola Balloon Grounds in Indianola, Iowa. Over 22,000 attended the show, which featured two full-sized stages with acts including Stone Sour, Avenged Sevenfold, Three Days Grace, Seether, Theory of a Deadman, Bullet For My Valentine, My Darkest Days, Saliva, Black Label Society, Rev Theory, Art of Dying, Escape the Fate and local band Facecage. Queensrÿche were scheduled to perform, but missed their connecting flight to Des Moines from Minneapolis earlier that day due to mechanical issues with their plane that resulted in arriving early evening, past their scheduled set time.

Lazerfest 2012 took place on Sunday, May 13 at the Central Iowa Expo in Boone. Approximately 15,000 attended the show, which featured two full-sized stages with acts including Shinedown, Five Finger Death Punch, Slash featuring Myles Kennedy and the Conspirators, Chevelle, Theory Of A Deadman, Volbeat, Adelitas Way, Buckcherry, Sebastian Bach, Black Stone Cherry, P.O.D., Art Of Dying and Dead Horse Trauma.

Lazerfest 2013 took place on Friday, May 10 at the Central Iowa Expo in Boone. Approximately 15,000 attended the show, which included the show's headliner Alice In Chains, along with Bush, Volbeat, Halestorm, Killswitch Engage, Papa Roach, All That Remains, Device featuring Disturbed frontman David Draiman, Sick Puppies, Thousand Foot Krutch, Young Guns, Asking Alexandria, Bloodnstuff and Fatal Addiction.

Lazerfest 2014 took place on Sunday, May 11 at Wells Fargo Arena in Des Moines. Thirteen bands played on two stages, including co-headliners The Offspring and Queens Of The Stone Age, plus Skillet, Theory Of A Deadman, Machine Head, Pop Evil, Adelitas Way, The Pretty Reckless, Thousand Foot Krutch, Powerman 5000, J Roddy Walston and the Business, We Came As Romans, and Chelsea Wolfe. Escape The Fate were forced to cancel their appearance due to a family emergency, and Green Death's set was cut due to inclement weather. On April 30, 2014, Lazer 103.3 posted on [their http://www.lazer1033.com website] that it would be moved from its usual location of the Central Iowa Expo in Boone to the Wells Fargo Arena in Des Moines.

Lazerfest 2015 took place on Friday, May 8 and Sunday, May 10 at the 7 Flags Event Center in Clive, Iowa. A total of twelve bands played over the course of the two-day festival; the Friday show featured Halestorm as the headliner, plus Young Guns, We Are Harlot, Starset, and local artists Holy White Hounds and Girls Rock Des Moines. Sunday was headlined by Five Finger Death Punch and also featured Falling In Reverse, Devour The Day, and local artists Green Death, Apathy Syndrome and Through The Darkness.

Lazerfest was discontinued after 2015.
