= KSTZ =

Radio station in Des Moines, Iowa

Coordinates: 41.800°N 93.608°W

- Des Moines, Iowa; United States
- Broadcast area: Des Moines metropolitan area
- Frequency: 102.5 MHz (HD Radio)
- Branding: Star 102.5

Programming
- Format: Hot adult contemporary
- Subchannels: HD2: 93.7 The Outlaw (Classic country)

Ownership
- Owner: Saga Communications; (Saga Communications of Iowa, LLC)
- Sister stations: KAZR; KIOA; KOEZ; KPSZ; KRNT

History
- First air date: 1970 (as KRNT-FM)
- Former call signs: KRNT-FM (1970–1974); KRNQ (1974–1993)
- Call sign meaning: "Stars", as in "Superstars"

Technical information
- Facility ID: 58541
- Class: C
- ERP: 92,000 watts; 100,000 with beam tilt
- HAAT: 384 meters (1,260 ft)
- Translator: HD2: 93.7 K229CC (Des Moines)

Links
- Webcast: Listen Live; Listen Live (HD2)
- Website: star1025.com; 937theoutlaw.com (HD2)

KSTZ (102.5 FM, "Star 102.5") is a commercial FM radio station in Des Moines, Iowa, United States. The station airs a hot adult contemporary radio format. KSTZ is part of Saga Communications' Des Moines Radio Group, with studios located on Locust Street in Des Moines.

KSTZ has an effective radiated power (ERP) of 92,000 watts (100,000 watts with beam tilt). The transmitter is located off Ankeny Boulevard (U.S. Route 69) near Alleman. KSTZ broadcasts in the HD Radio format. The HD2 subchannel carries a classic country format known as "93.7 The Outlaw - Legends and Young Guns", which is also relayed on 250-watt translator station K229CC, at 93.7 MHz.

== History ==
The station signed on the air in 1970 as KRNT-FM. It was the FM counterpart to KRNT (AM 1350). Both stations were owned by the Cowles family, publishers of the Des Moines Register. During those early years, Drake-Chenault's automated "Hit Parade" format was aired.

In 1974, the station became KRNQ ("Q-102"). That year, Cowles sold KRNQ and KRNT (AM) to Stauffer Communications of Topeka, Kansas. The two stations were sold to Saga Communications in September 1988. KRNQ was originally an automated Top 40 station. In January 1976, KRNQ began airing American Top 40 with Casey Kasem, and then Shadoe Stevens, until April 1989. In 1984, the automation ended and the station began using local DJs. By the end of the 1980s, KRNQ was at or near the top of the local Arbitron ratings.

In 1991, due to Saga's desire to reach older listeners, KRNQ's youthful Top 40 format was changed to a slightly older hot adult contemporary format and was known as "Q102/KRNQ, Today's Hits and Yesterday's Favorites". KRNQ promised to play no rap (even though it was rarely played on the station after Saga's purchase in 1988) and no hard rock, both of which were very much a part of popular music at the time. This format change left Des Moines with no contemporary hits outlet for nine years, until KKDM's flip from Alternative to Top 40/CHR in 1999. KRNQ became KSTZ on June 25, 1993. (The KRNQ call letters are now used for a station in Keokuk, Iowa.)

When the station re-imaged itself to adult contemporary on June 21, 1993, the positioning statement the station used was "Superstars of the 70s, 80s and 90s" (with the 'STZ' in the call letters forming an abbreviation for 'stars'). The station later switched to "The Best Variety of the 80s, 90s and Today." In 2001, the station began using the current positioning statement of "Today's Best Variety", returning to a hot AC direction. With KKDM becoming more of a factor since its 1999 debut, KSTZ has adjusted its playlist and adopted an adult top 40 format by adding a limited amount of adult-friendly rhythmic music with artists such Rihanna and The Black Eyed Peas in the mix.

== Popular contests ==
=== Pick Your Purse ===
Each Fall since 2005, the station has given away designer purses with the "Pick Your Purse" contest. Listeners enter on the station's website, then listen for their name to be read on the air. Once it is read, the listener has 10 minutes to call the station to claim the prize. The winner is allowed to pick from a selection of purses available on the station's website.

=== Secret Sounds of Summer ===
Listeners compete to guess the identity of a specific sound aired on the station. Correct guesses are awarded a cash prize and generally qualify for an opportunity to win a car.

=== Christmas Wish ===
One of the station's longest running promotions, listeners write in asking for whatever they would want for holidays. Selected winners are called by station personalities and awarded prizes.

==== Brenda Schmitz Christmas Wish ====
In 2013, a Christmas Wish was received by the station from Brenda Schmitz. Brenda wrote the Christmas Wish in August 2011, one month before she died from ovarian cancer at the age of 46. She asked her friend to send her wish to the radio station once her husband, David, had found a new partner to help take care of their four sons. The wish went viral around the world and was picked up by many news outlets including CNN, Yahoo!, The Huffington Post, and Mashable, among others. The wish was for David and his new wife to take their sons to Disney World in Florida as well as other gifts for the family.
