= KQBV =

- Adel, Iowa; United States
- Broadcast area: Dallas County, Iowa
- Frequency: 88.5 MHz
- Branding: Iowa Catholic Radio

Programming
- Format: Catholic radio

Ownership
- Owner: St. Gabriel Communications
- Sister stations: KIHS

History
- First air date: 2004
- Last air date: 2026
- Former call signs: KIHS (2001–2025)

Technical information
- Licensing authority: FCC
- Facility ID: 92489
- Class: C3
- ERP: 12,500 watts
- HAAT: 57 meters (187 ft)
- Transmitter coordinates: 41°36′9.1″N 94°2′55.4″W

Links
- Public license information: Public file; LMS
- Webcast: Listen live
- Website: www.iowacatholicradio.com

KQBV (88.5 FM) was a Catholic radio station licensed to Adel, Iowa, United States, and owned by St. Gabriel Communications.

== History ==
The station began broadcasting in 2004 as KIHS, and was owned by CSN International. In 2008, CSN International sold KIHS, along with a number of other stations, to Calvary Radio Network, Inc. These stations were sold to Calvary Chapel Costa Mesa later that year. In 2010, Calvary Radio Network purchased KIHS back from Calvary Chapel Costa Mesa.

In 2012, KIHS and its then-translator, K233BT, were sold to St. Gabriel Communications for a price of $600,000. The sale was consummated on September 24, 2012. On March 18, 2025, the call sign was changed to KQBV, ahead of the KIHS call sign being moved to KDLS-FM, the Iowa Catholic Radio station in Perry, on April 1.

The radio station ceased operations as of January 6, 2026.

Former logo before the frequency swap.
