= KJJY =

Coordinates: 41.665°N 93.757°W

- West Des Moines, Iowa; United States
- Broadcast area: Des Moines metropolitan area
- Frequency: 92.5 MHz
- Branding: 92.5 KJJY

Programming
- Format: Country

Ownership
- Owner: Cumulus Media; (Radio License Holding CBC, LLC)
- Sister stations: KGGO; KHKI; KWQW

History
- First air date: February 4, 1978 (as KANY at 106.3)
- Former call signs: KANY (1978–1981)
- Former frequencies: 106.3 MHz (1978–1988)
- Call sign meaning: J. J. Jeffrey (former owner)

Technical information
- Licensing authority: FCC
- Facility ID: 22882
- Class: C2
- ERP: 41,000 watts
- HAAT: 165 meters (541 ft)

Links
- Public license information: Public file; LMS
- Webcast: Listen live
- Website: www.kjjy.com

KJJY (92.5 FM) is a commercial radio station licensed to West Des Moines and serving Central Iowa. Cumulus Media owns two country music outlets in the Des Moines radio market, KJJY and 97.3 KHKI. KHKI plays mostly current and recent country hits, while KJJY's playlist goes from current releases to the 1980s and 1990s. The studio and offices are located on 109th Street in Urbandale.

KJJY has an effective radiated power (ERP) of 41,000 watts. The transmitter is on NW 100th Street at White Oak Lane in Grimes, Iowa.

== History ==
On February 4, 1978, the station signed on the air. The original call sign was KANY at 106.3 MHz, licensed to Ankeny, Iowa. On May 2, 1981, the station was sold by the Ankeny Broadcasting Company to Fuller-Jeffrey Broadcasting, which later changed the call letters to KJJY to match the initials of co-owner J. J. Jeffrey. The format was switched to country music.

As KJJY, the station slowly built a following, taking on the market's current country giant, 1350 KSO (now KRNT). KSO had been the market's country leader on the AM band since 1972. KJJY fended off a challenge from KKXI in 1986, asserting its dominance in the FM country market. To further compete in the market, KJJY moved to 92.5 MHz on July 1, 1988, and received a power upgrade to 50,000 watts. The 106.3 frequency went dark at this time but returned to the air in 1991. Today, KXNO-FM occupies the frequency.

In 2003, Citadel Broadcasting, which had purchased KHKI, acquired KJJY from Wilks Broadcasting. The pairing has paid off for both stations in the ratings without cannibalizing each other, with KHKI aiming at younger country fans and KJJY aiming a bit older. Citadel merged with Cumulus Media on September 16, 2011.

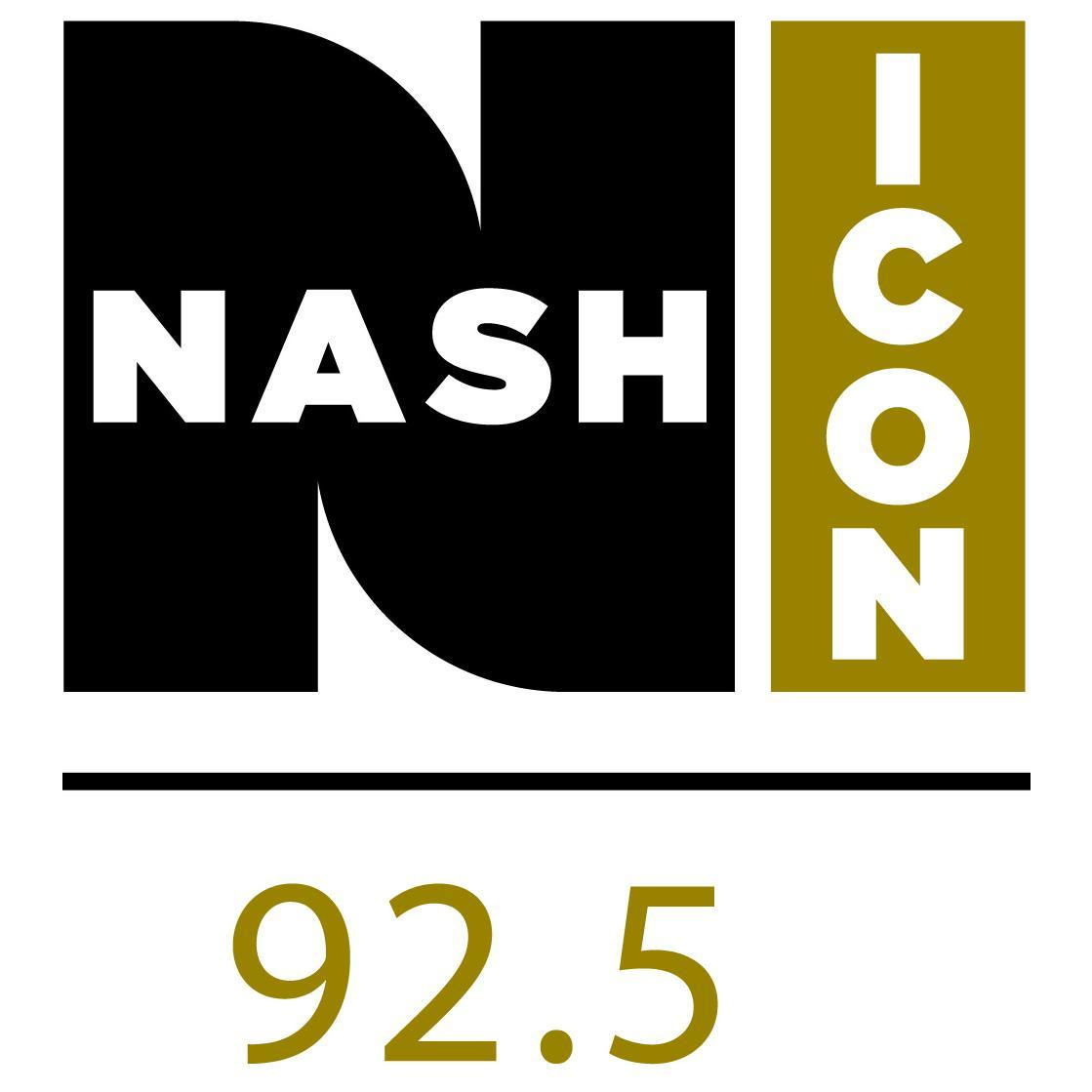
Logo as "92.5 Nash Icon"

At 3 p.m. on August 15, 2014, KJJY became one of the first affiliates of the new "Nash Icon" network as "92.5 Nash Icon". On May 28, 2019, Cumulus quietly dropped "Nash Icon" and reverted to its former KJJY branding.

== Current disk jockeys ==
John Mcoy, Eddie Hatfield, Tony Conrad
