= KRNT =

Radio station in Des Moines, Iowa

- Des Moines, Iowa; United States
- Broadcast area: Des Moines metropolitan area
- Frequency: 1350 kHz
- Branding: ESPN Des Moines

Programming
- Format: Sports
- Affiliations: ESPN Radio

Ownership
- Owner: Saga Communications; (Saga Communications of Iowa, LLC)
- Sister stations: KAZR; KIOA; KOEZ; KPSZ; KSTZ

History
- First air date: October 9, 1925 (in Clarinda, moved to Des Moines in 1932)
- Former call signs: KSO (1925–1935)
- Former frequencies: 1240 kHz (1925–1926); 740 kHz (1926–1927); 1320 kHz (1927–1928); 1380 kHz (1928–1932); 1370 kHz (1932–1934); 1320 kHz (1934–1941)
- Call sign meaning: Des Moines Register and Tribune (previous owner)

Technical information
- Licensing authority: FCC
- Facility ID: 58534
- Class: B
- Power: 5,000 watts
- Transmitter coordinates: 41°33′31″N 93°34′45.8″W
- Translator: 102.1 K271CO (Des Moines)

Links
- Public license information: Public file; LMS
- Webcast: Listen live
- Website: espndesmoines.com

KRNT (1350 AM) is a radio station in Des Moines, Iowa, United States, broadcasting a sports format. The station is owned by Saga Communications through licensee Saga Communications of Iowa, LLC; it operates as part of Saga's Des Moines Radio Group.

Studios are located on Locust Street in Des Moines, with its 4-tower transmitter array located on King Avenue in Des Moines.

== History ==
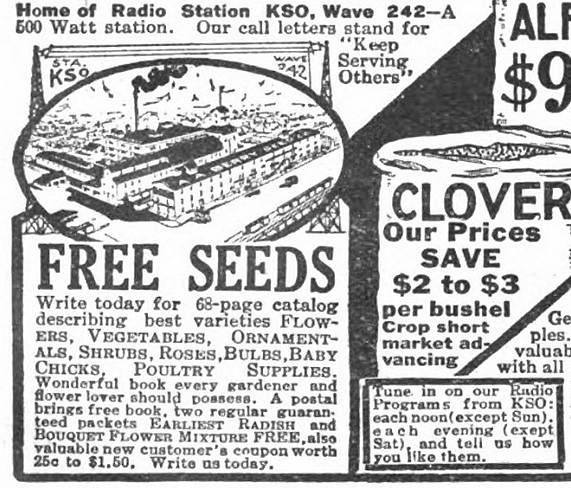
A 1926 advertisement extract noted KSO's "Keep Serving Others" slogan.

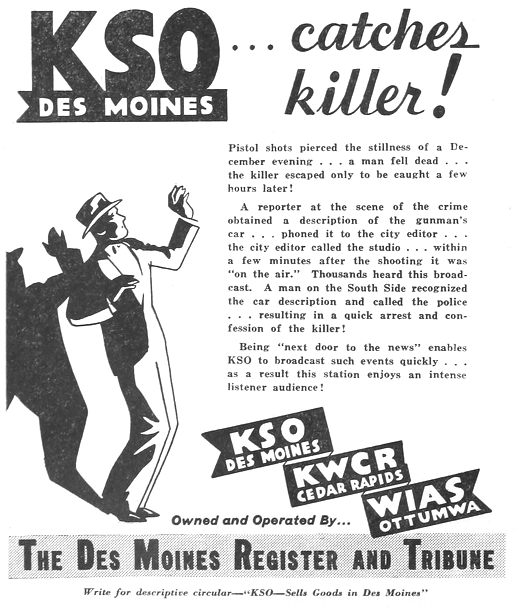
In 1932, KSO was moved to Des Moines, becoming KRNT in 1935.

=== KSO ===
The station was first licensed on October 9, 1925, to the A. A. Berry Seed Company in Clarinda, Iowa, transmitting on 1240 kHz, with the call sign KSO. The call letters reflected the slogan "Keep Serving Others".

In 1926, an adverse legal decision briefly eliminated the ability of the U.S. government to assign station frequencies and powers, and as of December 31, 1926, KSO was reported to now be at 740 kHz. The next year government control was re-established with the formation of the Federal Radio Commission (FRC), and on July 1, 1927, KSO was reassigned to 1320 kHz. Effective November 11, 1928, with the implementation of the FRC's General Order 40, the station moved to 1380 kHz.

On June 26, 1931, the Cowles family, publishers of the Des Moines Register and Tribune, bought KSO, via the Iowa Broadcasting Company. The new owners received permission to move KSO from Clarinda to Des Moines, and to begin broadcasting on 1370 kHz. KSO made its debut broadcast from the new location on November 5, 1932. In 1934, KSO was reassigned to 1320 kHz.

=== KRNT ===
On March 17, 1935, the callsign KSO was transferred to the former KWCR on 1430 kHz, which was relocated from Cedar Rapids to Des Moines. Concurrently, the call letters of the original KSO on 1320 kHz were changed to KRNT. At that time, both stations were owned and operated by subsidiary corporations of the Des Moines Register-Tribune.

In March 1941, stations on 1320 kHz, including KRNT, were moved to the 1350 kHz, as part of the North American Regional Broadcasting Agreement. In August 1941, the Federal Communications Commission (FCC) began implementation of a "duopoly" rule, which restricted licensees from operating more than one radio station in a given market.

KRNT won a Peabody Award in 1945 for outstanding reporting of news.

Then-owners Cowles Media started up a sister station, KRNT-FM (104.5) in 1948, but took it off the air and returned the license in 1955. In 1970, they signed on a second KRNT-FM (102.5 FM).

For years, KRNT carried an adult standards format, supplemented by sports programming (most notably the Chicago Cubs and Drake University athletics). On September 10, 2015, the adult standards format was moved to sister station KAZR's HD2 subchannel and translator K283CC 104.5 FM. KRNT was rebranded ESPN Des Moines as it became the market's ESPN Radio affiliate.

In April 2022, station owner Saga Communications requested a waiver to change the call sign back to the original KSO. However, broadcasting stations were now generally required to have four-letter call signs, and the FCC was unwilling to make an exception.

== Programming ==
KRNT features programming from ESPN Radio. In addition, it serves as the broadcast outlet for several sports teams:

- Drake University athletics (football, men's and women's basketball)
- Chicago Cubs baseball
