= KHKI =

Radio station in Des Moines, Iowa

Coordinates: 41.663°N 93.757°W

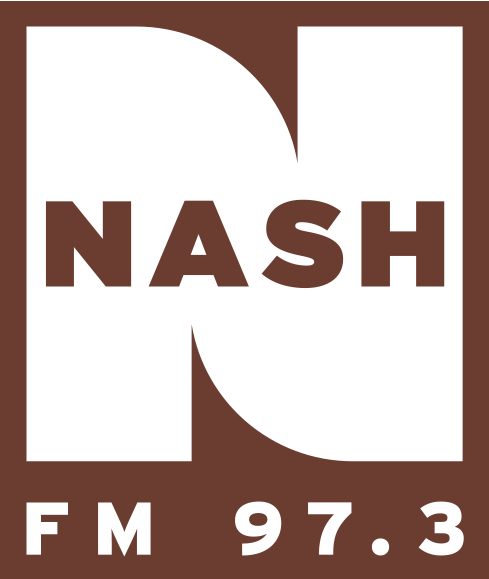
- Des Moines, Iowa; United States
- Broadcast area: Des Moines metropolitan area
- Frequency: 97.3 MHz
- Branding: Nash FM 97.3

Programming
- Format: Country
- Affiliations: Westwood One

Ownership
- Owner: Cumulus Media; (Radio License Holding CBC, LLC)
- Sister stations: KGGO; KJJY; KWQW

History
- First air date: 1961 (as KDMI)
- Former call signs: KDMI (1961–1980); KDMI-FM (1980–1993)
- Call sign meaning: "The Hawk Iowa" (previous meaning)

Technical information
- Licensing authority: FCC
- Facility ID: 12966
- Class: C1
- ERP: 105,000 watts
- HAAT: 143 meters (469 ft)

Links
- Public license information: Public file; LMS
- Webcast: Listen live
- Website: nashfm973.com

KHKI (97.3 FM) is a commercial radio station in Des Moines, Iowa. The station is owned by Cumulus Media and airs a country music radio format known as "97.3 Nash FM". On weekdays, local DJs are heard during the day, while in the evening, KHKI airs two nationally syndicated Nash FM programs from parent company Cumulus, including "Nash Nights Live" and "The Blair Garner Show". On weekends, "Bob Kingsley's Country Top 40" is heard. . KHKI's studios are in Urbandale, Iowa, with other Cumulus Des Moines stations: KJJY, KGGO, and KWQW. Its transmitter is located on Northwest 100th Street on the border between Grimes and Johnston. While the maximum power for most FM stations in Iowa is 100,000 watts, KHKI's effective radiated power (ERP) is slightly higher, at 105,000 watts; because KHKI dates back to 1961, it is grandfathered at the higher output.

== History ==
The station first signed on the air in February 1961 as KDMI. It was owned by Richards & Associates, Inc. There was no AM counterpart. KDMI was a rare stand-alone FM station in an era when few people owned FM radios. From the 1970s to the early 1990s, KDMI aired a Christian radio format.

In 1993, the station was acquired by American Radio Systems. On January 2, 1994, KDMI began stunting with an electronic countdown to 5:30 p.m. on January 7. At that time, the station, now under new KHKI call letters, flipped to a country music format as "97.3 KHKI, Hawkeye Country" (with the new branding referring to the team name for the University of Iowa). Later, the station rebranded to "The Hawk 97-3" before becoming "97.3 The Hawk". On May 24, 2013, KHKI became "Nash FM 97.3" as part of Cumulus Media's plan to convert most of its 84 country-formatted properties to the "Nash FM" brand.
