= KIHS =

KIHS-FM
- Perry, Iowa; United States
- Broadcast area: Des Moines metropolitan area
- Frequency: 105.5 MHz

Programming
- Format: Catholic radio

Ownership
- Owner: Rick Ball; (Trinity Communications, Inc.)
- Sister stations: KQBV

History
- First air date: February 26, 1971
- Former call signs: KDLS (1971-2025)

Technical information
- Licensing authority: FCC
- Class: C3
- ERP: 10,000 watts
- HAAT: 141 m (463 ft)
- Transmitter coordinates: 41°43′35.1″N 93°51′36.5″W

Links
- Public license information: Public file; LMS
- Webcast: Listen live
- Website: iowacatholicradio.com

KIHS-FM (105.5 MHz) is a commercial FM radio station licensed to Perry, Iowa, and serving the Des Moines metropolitan area. Owned by Trinity Communications, Inc., the station broadcasts a Catholic radio format as part of the Iowa Catholic Radio Network. The station's transmitter is located in Granger, Iowa.

== History ==
On February 26, 1971, KIHS-FM first signed on as KDLS-FM. It was originally on 104.9 MHz. It was owned by the Perry Broadcasting Company, along with KDLS (1310 AM). Even though both stations continued to share the KDLS call sign until 2025.

In the 1990s, the station, as KDLS-FM moved to 101.7 MHz and then later 105.5 MHz. The station broadcast a country music format with frequent farm reports.

In the early 2000s, KDLS-FM was sold to owners specializing in Latin music formats. It switched to regional Mexican music.

Effective May 19, 2023, Latin Broadcasting Company sold KDLS-FM for $1.84 million to Trinity Communications, Inc. Trinity, the operator of the Iowa Catholic Radio network, continued to air the "La Ley" regional Mexican format on the station until April 1, 2025, when the two broadcasters swapped dial positions. On that date, KDLS-FM officially changed its call sign to KIHS-FM and began airing Catholic programming, while the "La Ley" format moved to 1150 AM (KDLX).
