= KNIA =

- Knoxville, Iowa; United States
- Broadcast area: Knoxville and Pella, Iowa
- Frequency: 1320 kHz
- Branding: Real Country AM 1320

Programming
- Format: Country
- Affiliations: AP News

Ownership
- Owner: M and H Broadcasting, Inc.
- Sister stations: KRLS

History
- First air date: 1960
- Call sign meaning: KN for Knoxville, IA for Iowa

Technical information
- Licensing authority: FCC
- Facility ID: 39463
- Class: D
- Power: 500 watts day 222 watts night
- Transmitter coordinates: 41°19′50″N 93°06′34″W
- Translators: 94.3 K232FR (Indianola); 95.3 K237DH (Knoxville)

Links
- Public license information: Public file; LMS
- Webcast: Listen Live
- Website: kniakrls.com

KNIA (1320 AM "Real Country AM 1320") is a commercial radio station licensed to Knoxville, Iowa, United States. The station airs a country radio format and is owned by M and H Broadcasting, Inc. Programming is also heard on two FM translator stations: 95.3 K237DH in Knoxville and 94.3 K232FR in Indianola.

KNIA includes local news and information in its weekday schedule. On Sundays, Southern Gospel music and other religious programming is aired. KNIA also broadcasts local high school football and basketball games.

== History ==
Forrest ("Frosty") Mitchell put KNIA on the air in 1960. In September 1964, Mitchell Broadcasting Corporation (Forrest J. Mitchell Jr., president) announced the sale of KNIA to Stevens Radio Corporation.

In December 1992, Leighton Enterprises, Inc., reached an agreement to sell this station to M and H Broadcasting, Inc. The deal was approved by the FCC on February 23, 1993, and the transaction was consummated on March 1, 1993.

Former logo
