= KGGO =

Radio station in Des Moines, Iowa

Coordinates: 41.632°N 93.457°W

- Des Moines, Iowa; United States
- Broadcast area: Des Moines metropolitan area
- Frequency: 94.9 MHz
- Branding: 95 KGGO

Programming
- Format: Classic rock
- Affiliations: Westwood One

Ownership
- Owner: Cumulus Media; (Radio License Holding CBC, LLC)
- Sister stations: KHKI; KJJY; KWQW

History
- First air date: May 31, 1964 (as KFMG)
- Former call signs: KFMG (1964–1975)
- Call sign meaning: "Go" (previous Top 40 format)

Technical information
- Facility ID: 12965
- Class: C0
- ERP: 100,000 watts
- HAAT: 325 meters (1,066 ft)

Links
- Webcast: Listen live
- Website: www.kggo.com

KGGO (94.9 FM) is a commercial radio station in Des Moines, Iowa. It is owned by Cumulus Media and airs a classic rock radio format. The station's studios and offices are in Urbandale, Iowa, with Cumulus Media's other Des Moines stations: KJJY, KHKI, and KWQW. (Before 2001, KGGO's studios were located in Berwick, north of Des Moines.) KGGO carries two nationally syndicated shows on its weekday schedule, The Bob & Tom Show, in morning drive time and Nights with Alice Cooper in the evening. Middays and afternoons feature local DJs.

KGGO has an effective radiated power (ERP) of 100,000 watts, the maximum output for non-grandfathered FM stations. The transmitter is located off 24th Street SE, near 6th Avenue SE, in Altoona.

== History ==
=== KNDR and KFMG ===
The first radio station to occupy the 94.9 FM frequency in Des Moines was KNDR (New Directions Radio), which signed on in 1961. It was under the ownership of the Hopkins family, with studios in the Brown Hotel. But in the early 1960s, few people owned FM radios. The station left the air a year later due to financial problems.

On May 31, 1964, KFMG debuted on that frequency with a "fine arts" classical music format. The station was owned by Bill and Ruth Plymat. Once again, the station used studios in the Brown Hotel in downtown Des Moines. The tower was located atop the hotel with the transmitter on the 11th floor. The station started broadcasting in FM stereo in December 1969 with a concert from the Boston Symphony Orchestra.

=== Progressive rock ===
Longtime announcer Ron Sorenson hosted a late night program of progressive rock music called the "Roc Show," during the years KFMG was owned by the Plymat Family. When the Woodland Corporation bought the station in 1969, Sorenson convinced the new owners to go with that format on a full-time basis. On March 1, 1970, KFMG became a free-form station that played a wide variety of rock and other music. Morning host John Krantz played the first song at 6 a.m. that day, "Colour My World," by Chicago.

KFMG had some setbacks that year. The planned demolition of the Brown Hotel caused Woodland to seek a new studio and location for the antenna and transmitter. A new location atop the Teachout Building did not give KFMG the coverage that it previously had from the Brown Hotel. In 1971, the station was sold to the Stoner Corporation and became a sister station to KSO (1460 AM, now KXNO). When Stoner took over, KFMG's format was changed to Top 40 music during the day which Sorenson protested. As a result, he left the station in protest during his morning shift. Stoner management soon found out that KFMG had a small but loyal listenership when they expressed displeasure over Sorenson's departure.

=== Top 40 and Album rock ===
Stoner ran a full-page ad in the Des Moines Register to appease disgruntled KFMG listeners, but the station did not return to a rock format for several years. KFMG became KGGO in 1975. For its first few years as a Top 40 outlet, it used the moniker "Go-95."

The station shifted to an album-oriented rock (AOR) format on July 19, 1978. In the spring of 1984, KGGO became the first FM station in the Des Moines area to finish in first place in the local Arbitron ratings. KGGO remained the Des Moines area's highest-rated radio station throughout most of the late 1980s and 1990s.

KGGO's rock format was simulcast on 1460 AM from 1989 to 1994 after the former KSO radio ended its country music format. The AM frequency adopted the KGGO call letters during that time period, while 94.9 added an -FM suffix. The simulcast ended in 1994, when 1460's call letters became KDMI. By the end of the 1990s, KGGO had transitioned to a classic rock format.

=== Ownership changes ===
Logo under previous slogan

KGGO's ownership has changed several times in recent years. American Radio Systems (ARS) bought KGGO from Stoner in 1993. ARS owned KGGO until October 1997, when AMFM acquired the station. In 2000, AMFM merged with Clear Channel Communications. Since Clear Channel already owned several stations in the Des Moines radio market, KGGO and sister station KHKI were spun off to Barnstable Broadcasting. (Clear Channel kept KDMI, which later became KXNO.) In May 2001, Barnstable sold its Des Moines cluster of stations to Wilks Broadcasting. Two years later, Wilks sold the stations to Citadel Broadcasting. Citadel merged with Cumulus Media on September 16, 2011.

On September 22, 2005, Citadel Broadcasting purchased the naming rights to the former Buccaneer Arena in Urbandale. The home of the Des Moines Buccaneers was then renamed 95KGGO Arena. In 2008, the name reverted to Buccaneer Arena.
