= KWQW =

Radio station in Boone–Des Moines, Iowa

- Boone, Iowa; United States
- Broadcast area: Des Moines, Iowa
- Frequency: 98.3 MHz
- Branding: 98.3 The Vibe

Programming
- Format: Top 40
- Affiliations: Cumulus Media Networks

Ownership
- Owner: Cumulus Media; (Radio License Holding CBC, LLC)
- Sister stations: KGGO; KHKI; KJJY

History
- First air date: 1975 (as KWBG-FM)
- Former call signs: KWBG-FM (1975–1991); KIAB (1991–1993); KRUU (1993–1996); KRKQ (1996–2003); KBGG-FM (2003–2004)
- Call sign meaning: "Wow" (previous branding)

Technical information
- Facility ID: 30116
- Class: C2
- ERP: 41,000 watts
- HAAT: 165 meters (541 ft)
- Transmitter coordinates: 41°49′51″N 93°43′54″W

Links
- Webcast: Listen live
- Website: www.983vibe.com

KWQW (98.3 FM, "The Vibe") is a top 40 radio station licensed to Boone, Iowa, United States, and serving the Des Moines metropolitan area. The station is owned by Cumulus Media. KWQW's studios are in Urbandale, along with Cumulus' other Des Moines stations: KGGO, KJJY, and KHKI. Its transmitter is located near Big Creek Lake southwest of Sheldahl.

== History ==
The station began as KWBG-FM in 1975, a local radio station for Boone, Iowa. In 1991, the station started to target the Des Moines metropolitan area with a country music format with callsigns KIAB "K98" from 1991 to 1993. The station then became known as KRUU "The Rooster" from 1993 to 1996, also with a country music format, before becoming KRKQ on January 12, 1996.

As KRKQ, the station took on the nickname of "98 Rock", featuring a classic rock format that competed with longtime ratings leader KGGO, as well as the syndicated Bob and Tom Show In 2000, the station's format was tweaked to classic hits as "Magic 98.3" after owner Barnstable Communications acquired KGGO. A short time later, the format was changed to adult contemporary as "98.3 the River."

Barnstable sold all of its Des Moines stations to Wilks Broadcasting in 2001; the stations were sold to Citadel Broadcasting in 2003. On November 11 of that year, Citadel changed KRKQ's format to talk radio as "WOW-FM, the Capital's Big Talker". The Bob & Tom Show was the only program that carried over to the new format. The station's call sign was changed to KBGG-FM shortly afterwards. On December 28, 2004, the call sign became KWQW. The Bob & Tom Show remained on the station until December 30, 2011, when it was moved to KGGO. In 2005, Paul Harvey became part of the station's lineup after WHO dropped the show.

Citadel merged with Cumulus Media in September 2011.

In April 2014, KWQW rebranded as "98.3 The Torch" but continued with a conservative talk format. "The Torch" primarily carried Cumulus Media Networks' in-house offerings, including Dennis Miller, The Savage Nation, The Mark Levin Show, John Batchelor, and Red Eye Radio, all in their live time slots. (The station did not carry Imus in the Morning or Herman Cain.) A local morning show, The Morning Drive, aired (as its name indicated) in morning drive time, and the station also carried the last two hours of the Glenn Beck Program live (WHO, whose sister company Premiere Networks owns Beck's rights, does not carry Beck). The station served as an affiliate for the Kansas City Chiefs.

On October 5, 2015, at Noon, KWQW flipped to classic hip hop as "98.3 The Vibe". On May 28, 2021, at midnight, KWQW flipped to Top 40/CHR, maintaining the "Vibe" branding and putting it in competition with KKDM.
