= KCII (AM) =

KCII and KCII-FM
Washington, Iowa; United States
- Frequencies: KCII: 1380 kHz; KCII-FM: 106.1 MHz
- Branding: AM & FM KCII

Programming
- Format: Classic hits, full-service and sports
- Affiliations: AP News

Ownership
- Owner: M&H/Home Broadcasting

History
- First air date: KCII: 1961; KCII-FM: 1975
- Call sign meaning: "Kleanest [sic] City In Iowa" (slogan for Washington, Iowa)

Technical information
- Licensing authority: FCC
- Facility ID: KCII: 71014; KCII-FM: 71015
- Class: KCII: D; KCII-FM: A
- Power: KCII: 500 watts (day); 25 watts (night)
- ERP: KCII-FM: 6,200 watts
- HAAT: KCII-FM: 91 meters (299 ft)
- Transmitter coordinates: KCII: 41°18′18″N 91°42′36″W
- Translator(s): KCII: 102.5 K273CC (Mount Pleasant)

Links
- Public license information: KCII: Public file; LMS; KCII-FM: Public file; LMS
- Webcast: Listen live
- Website: kciiradio.com

KCII (1380 AM) and KCII-FM (106.1 FM) are two commercial radio stations licensed to Washington, Iowa, United States, 30 minutes south of Iowa City. Both stations jointly simulcast a full-service/classic hits format with news, sports, community events, severe weather bulletins, and agriculture information. KCII is a part of the Cedar Rapids ADI market as recorded by Arbitron. It was first licensed on February 1, 1962.

KCII is on air 24 hours per day. A full programming list is at kciiradio.com.

KCII 1380 AM was first started in 1961. The studio is located at 110 E Main Street near the Town Square in Washington.

== Translator ==
Broadcast translator for KCII
Call sign	Frequency	City of license	FID	ERP (W)	HAAT	Class	FCC info
K273CC	102.5 FM	Mount Pleasant, Iowa	148635	250	84.5 m (277 ft)	D	LMS

Former logo
