= List of television stations in Iowa =

This is a list of broadcast television stations that are licensed in the U.S. state of Iowa.

== Full-power ==
- Stations are arranged by media market served and channel position.

Full-power television stations in Iowa
Media market	Station	Channel	Primary affiliation(s)	Notes	Refs
Cedar Rapids	KGAN	2	CBS, Fox on 2.2		
Cedar Rapids	KWWL	7	NBC	(Note: Licensed to Waterloo, Iowa.)	
Cedar Rapids	KCRG-TV	9	ABC, MyNetworkTV on 9.2, The CW on 9.3		
Cedar Rapids	KWKB	20	TCT	(Note: Licensed to Iowa City, Iowa.)	
Cedar Rapids	KFXA	28	Roar		
Cedar Rapids	KRIN	32	PBS	(Note: Satellite of KDIN-TV.)	
Cedar Rapids	KFXB-TV	40	CTN	(Note: Licensed to Dubuque, Iowa.)	
Cedar Rapids	KPXR-TV	48	Ion Television		
Davenport	KWQC-TV	6	NBC		
Davenport	KIIN	12	PBS		
Davenport	KLJB	18	Fox		
Davenport	KGCW	26	The CW, CBS on 26.4	(Note: Licensed to Burlington, Iowa.)	
Davenport	KQIN	36	PBS		
Des Moines	WOI-DT	5	ABC	(Note: Licensed to Ames, Iowa.)	
Des Moines	KCCI	8	CBS, MyNetworkTV/Heroes & Icons on 8.3		
Des Moines	KDIN-TV	11	PBS		
Des Moines	WHO-DT	13	NBC		
Des Moines	KDSM-TV	17	Fox		
Des Moines	KDMI	19	TCT		
Des Moines	KCWI-TV	23	The CW, ABC on 5.5		
Des Moines	KTIN	21	PBS	(Note: Licensed to Fort Dodge, Iowa.)	
Des Moines	KFPX-TV	39	Ion Television	(Note: Licensed to Newton, Iowa.)	
Ottumwa	KYOU-TV	15	Fox, NBC on 15.2, The CW on 15.4		
Sioux City	KTIV	4	NBC, The CW on 4.2		
Sioux City	KCAU-TV	9	ABC		
Sioux City	KMEG	14	Dabl		
Sioux City	KSIN-TV	27	PBS		
Sioux City	KPTH	44	Fox, Roar/MyNetworkTV on 44.2, CBS on 44.3		
~Rochester, MN	KIMT	3	CBS, MyNetworkTV on 3.2	(Note: Licensed to Mason City, Iowa.)	
~Rochester, MN	KYIN	24	PBS		
~Omaha, NE	KBIN-TV	32	PBS	(Note: Licensed to Council Bluffs, Iowa.)	
~Omaha, NE	KHIN	36	PBS	(Note: Licensed to Red Oak, Iowa.)	

== Low-power ==
Low-power television stations in Iowa
Media market	Station	Channel	Primary affiliation(s)	Notes	Refs
Cedar Rapids	K17MH-D	16	Various	(Note: Licensed to Cedar Falls, Iowa.)	
Cedar Rapids	KFKZ-LD	35	Various		
Davenport	K20KF-D	16	3ABN		
Des Moines	WBXF-CD	28	Various		
Des Moines	K32NM-D	32	HSN		
Des Moines	KAJR-LD	36	Various		
Des Moines	KRPG-LD	43	Various		
Des Moines	K31PO-D	44	[Blank]		
Des Moines	KCYM-LD	44	Various		
Des Moines	KDIT-CD	45	Catchy Comedy		
Sioux City	KBWF-LD	15	News Channel Nebraska, Telemundo on 15.2		
Sioux City	KSXE-LD	16	Grit		
Sioux City	K31PP-D	31	[Blank]		
~Quincy, IL	K14SU-D	14	Various	(Note: Licensed to Keokuk, Iowa.)	
~Rochester, MN	K22LJ-D	22	[Blank]		

== Translators ==
Television station translators in Iowa
Media market	Station	Channel	Translating	Notes	Refs
Des Moines	KDIT-LD	45	KDIT-CD		
Ottumwa	K18GU-D	12	KIIN		
Ottumwa	K24IM-D	12	KIIN	(Note: Licensed to Keosauqua, Iowa.)	
Sioux City	K27LD-D	4	KTIV	(Note: Licensed to Salix, Iowa.)	
Sioux City	K18KG-D	14	KMEG	(Note: Licensed to Spencer, Iowa.)	
Sioux City	KBVK-LD	44	KPTH		
~Quincy, IL	K28JD-D	12	KIIN	(Note: Licensed to Fort Madison, Iowa.)	
~Quincy, IL	K19KX-D	12	KIIN		
~Rochester, MN	KAAL (DRT)	6	KAAL	(Note: Licensed to Garner, Iowa.)	
~Rochester, MN	K30QY-D	10	KTTC		
~Rochester, MN	K25PE-D	24	KYIN	(Note: Licensed to Decorah, Iowa.)	
~Sioux Falls, SD	K33PV-D	27	KSIN	(Note: Licensed to Rock Rapids, Iowa.)	
~Sioux Falls, SD	K26JI-D	27	KSIN	(Note: Licensed to Sibley, Iowa.)	
~Eau Claire, WI	K31NJ-D	24	KYIN	(Note: Licensed to Lansing, Iowa.)	

== Defunct ==
- KDUB-TV Dubuque (1970–1974)
- KEFB Ames (2005–2016)
- KGTV Des Moines (1953–1955)
- KVFD-TV Fort Dodge (1953–1977)
- KWWF Waterloo (2002–2013)
