= KCWI-TV =

Television station in Ames, Iowa

- Ames–Des Moines, Iowa; United States
- City: Ames, Iowa
- Channels: Digital: 23 (UHF); Virtual: 23
- Branding: CW Iowa 23; Local 5 News

Programming
- Affiliations: 23.1: The CW; 5.5: ABC; for others, see § Subchannels

Ownership
- Owner: Tegna Inc., a subsidiary of Nexstar Media Group; (Tegna Broadcast Holdings, LLC)
- Sister stations: WOI-DT; Nexstar: WHO-DT

History
- First air date: January 20, 2001
- Former call signs: KPWB-TV (2001–2006)
- Former channel numbers: Analog: 23 (UHF, 2001–2009)
- Former affiliations: The WB (2001–2006); UPN (secondary, 2001–2003)
- Call sign meaning: The CW Iowa

Technical information
- Licensing authority: FCC
- Facility ID: 51502
- ERP: 246 kW; 1,000 kW (application)
- HAAT: 610 m (2,001 ft)
- Transmitter coordinates: 41°49′48″N 93°36′54.6″W

Links
- Public license information: Public file; LMS
- Website: www.weareiowa.com

KCWI-TV (channel 23) is a television station licensed to Ames, Iowa, United States, serving as the CW outlet for the Des Moines area. It is owned by the Tegna subsidiary of Nexstar Media Group alongside ABC affiliate WOI-DT (channel 5); Nexstar also owns NBC affiliate WHO-DT (channel 13). KCWI-TV and WOI-DT share studios on Westown Parkway in West Des Moines; KCWI-TV's transmitter is located in Alleman, Iowa.

== History ==
=== As a WB affiliate ===
Channel 23 first signed on the air on January 20, 2001, under the call sign KPWB-TV. The station originally maintained a primary affiliation with The WB and a secondary affiliation with UPN, and was owned by Pappas Telecasting. (This was the second Pappas-owned WB affiliate to use the KPWB-TV call sign; the company previously owned what is now KMAX-TV in Sacramento, California, from 1995 to 1998.) KPWB dropped UPN programming in 2003. Prior to the station's launch, this area had been without programming from The WB; from 1995 to 1999, The WB programming was available on Des Moines–Ames cable systems via the former superstation feed of WGN-TV in Chicago, and from 1999 to 2001, via Iowa City affiliated KWKB. During its time as KPWB, the station carried St. Louis Cardinals baseball games syndicated from KPLR-TV. It also aired select Chicago Cubs baseball games which were carried by WGN beginning in the 2016 season.

Older KPWB logo, used from 2001 to 2006.

=== As a CW affiliate ===
On January 24, 2006, Time Warner and CBS Corporation announced the shutdowns of The WB and UPN effective that September. In place of these networks, both companies decided to form The CW, a new service that combined the most popular programming from both UPN and The WB with new series produced specifically for the network. Just over one month later on February 22, 2006, News Corporation announced that it would start up MyNetworkTV, a sister network to Fox, which would be operated as a joint venture between Fox Television Stations and Twentieth Television. MyNetworkTV was created in order to give UPN and WB-affiliated stations that were not selected to join The CW another option besides becoming an independent station.

It seemed very likely that KPWB would become The CW's Des Moines affiliate, as NBC affiliate WHO-TV (channel 13) had a secondary affiliation with UPN. On March 16, 2006, Pappas Telecasting signed an affiliation agreement to make KPWB the market's CW affiliate. A few months later, MyNetworkTV announced that it would affiliate with a new station also owned by Pappas, KDMI (then on channel 56), which began broadcasting that network on September 5, 2006. On September 18, 2006, the date that The CW officially launched, KPWB changed its call letters to KCWI-TV to reflect its new affiliation.

After MyNetworkTV converted to a programming service in September 2009, KDMI dropped the affiliation in favor of joining This TV. WWE SmackDown, which aired on MyNetworkTV at the time, moved to KCWI airing in a Saturday prime time slot; the station stopped airing the show on September 11, 2010, three weeks before SmackDown itself moved from MyNetworkTV to Syfy that October. As a result of KDMI dropping the MyNetworkTV affiliation, Des Moines was the largest Nielsen media market without an over-the-air affiliate of the service until KDMI rejoined MyNetworkTV on October 3, 2011, though that station began carrying the service's programming four hours later than most MyNetworkTV affiliates upon rejoining the service (Nexstar Broadcasting Group–owned WLMT in Memphis also aired SmackDown in a manner very similar to KCWI after MyNetworkTV's original Memphis affiliate WPXX-TV dropped the programming service; WLMT's second digital subchannel eventually affiliated with the service after SmackDown moved to Syfy).

On October 24, 2014, Pappas reached a deal to sell KCWI-TV to Nexstar Broadcasting Group for $3.5 million. The deal separated the station from KDMI, but created a new duopoly with ABC affiliate WOI-DT (channel 5), by coincidence also licensed to Ames. Shortly after the sale was announced, Harry and Stella Pappas sued to block the deal, arguing that the price undervalued KCWI. The deal was approved by the FCC on December 19, 2014, but the completion of the deal was placed on hold due to the lawsuit. The sale was formally completed on March 14, 2016, with Nexstar announcing shortly after that KCWI would leave its downtown Des Moines studios and consolidate operations with WOI at that station's West Des Moines facilities as of April 1.

Nexstar purchased Tribune Media, then the owner of WHO-DT, for $6.4 billion in cash and debt on December 3, 2018. Prohibited from owning all three stations, Nexstar opted to retain WHO and sold KCWI and WOI to Tegna Inc. as part of an 11-station, $740-million divestiture package.

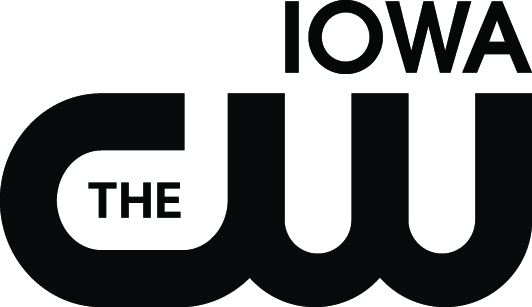
Former KCWI logo, used from 2016 to 2024.

Nexstar acquired Tegna in a deal announced in August 2025 and completed on March 19, 2026. The deal included approval via the FCC's Media Bureau for Nexstar to own three station licenses in markets such as Des Moines. The year before, a federal appeals court had struck down a rule barring ownership of two top-four station licenses. A temporary restraining order issued by the U.S. District Court for the Eastern District of California on March 28, 2026, later escalated to a preliminary injunction on April 17, has prevented Nexstar from integrating the stations.

== Newscasts ==
KCWI presently broadcasts a total of 18 1/2 hours of local newscasts each week (a three-hour local weekday morning newscast from 7 to 10 a.m. and a nightly half hour newscast at 9 p.m.). KCWI did not broadcast any news programming until April 2012, when the station debuted a three-hour morning news and interview show called Great Day on KCWI, now airing four hours each weekday from 6 to 10 a.m. since September 2013. In addition to news, weather, sports and traffic reports, Great Day features guest interviews, animal segments, comedians, music and various videos. The station did not previously offer a prime time newscast following CW network programming, with syndicated sitcom reruns airing instead during the 9 p.m. timeslot. When Nexstar completed its sale of the station, the show's name was changed to The KCWI23-HD Morning Show.

On April 11, 2016, KCWI's morning show was changed once again, this time to CW Iowa Live airing from 7 to 10 a.m. with the 6 a.m. hour now being occupied by infomercials to avoid competition with WOI-DT's morning show. The newly revamped show retained Michelle Brown and Lou Sipolt, but meteorologist Jason Parkin was let go as a result of the changes made; the show also retains the variety show feel of Great Day with some local segments by WOI's news team. The following week, on April 18, KCWI began airing a nightly half-hour 9 p.m. newscast also produced by WOI and also competes against the KCCI-produced newscast on Fox affiliate KDSM-TV.

== Technical information ==
=== Subchannels ===
The station's signal is multiplexed:

Subchannels of KCWI-TV
| Subchannel | Res. | Short name | Programming |
|---|---|---|---|
| 23.1 | 720p | KCWI-HD | The CW |
| 23.2 | 480i | Quest | Quest |
| 23.3 | 480i | OPEN | Oxygen |
| 23.4 | 480i | Quest | [Blank] |
| 23.5 | 480i | GetTV | Great (4:3) |
| 23.6 | 480i | ShopLC | [Blank] |
| 5.5 | 720p | WOI-HD | ABC (WOI-DT) |

Simulcast of subchannels of another station

In February 2020, a fifth subchannel of KCWI-TV was launched as a UHF simulcast of WOI-DT in order to alleviate reception issues with WOI's channel 5 VHF signal.

=== Analog-to-digital conversion ===
KCWI-TV shut down its analog signal, over UHF channel 23, on June 12, 2009, and "flash-cut" its digital signal into operation UHF channel 23. Because it was granted an original construction permit after the Federal Communications Commission finalized the DTV allotment plan on April 21, 1997, the station did not receive a companion channel for a digital television station. Due to this abnormality, the station's digital signal was carried as a subchannel of now former sister station KDMI.
