= Terrace Hill Piano Competition =

The Terrace Hill Piano Competition is an annual piano competition held and filmed at the Iowa PBS studios in Johnston, Iowa. The competition was established in 1986 by the Terrace Hill Endowment for Musical Arts. It awards more than $7,000 in prize money annually and has two categories: Senior for Iowa high school seniors and Junior for pianists in grades 9-11. The first, second, and third place winners in the Senior competition all receive scholarship prizes to be used to enroll as a piano major or minor at any Iowa college or university, with the winner receiving "The First Family of Iowa Scholarship". All adjudication is done by out-of-state professional musicians.
