= Floppy (disambiguation) =

Floppy usually refers to a floppy disk.

Floppy may also refer to:

- Floppy-disk controller
- The Floppy Show, an American children's television series
- Mr Floppy, an Australian rock band
- Mr. Floppy, a talking, toy rabbit from the television sitcom Unhappily Ever After
- An American comic book
- Floppy, a dog in the children's novel series The Magic Key by Roderick Hunt and Alex Brychta
- Floppy, a stuffed rabbit in Bluey
