= Russ Van Dyke =

American broadcast journalist

Russell James Van Dyke
- Born: August 28, 1917; Adams, Nebraska, U.S.
- Died: July 19, 1992 (aged 74); Clear Lake, Iowa, U.S.
- Resting place: Glendale Cemetery, Des Moines, Iowa
- Citizenship: U.S.
- Occupations: Television and radio broadcaster, news anchor
- Years active: 1945–1983
- Spouse: Janice Van Dyke (1920–2012)
- Children: James Van Dyke, Robert Van Dyke, Carolynn Van Dyke
- Parents: James Frank Van Dyke (1890–1951) (father); Anna Sinnen Van Dyke (1887–1955) (mother)

Russell Van Dyke (August 28, 1917 – July 19, 1992) was a broadcast journalist during the early years of television in Iowa, known as "The Walter Cronkite of Iowa" and the dean of the state's newscasters. Van Dyke was born in Adams, Nebraska, and lived in Des Moines, Iowa for 40 years. After retiring in 1983, he moved to Clear Lake, Iowa with Janice, his wife of 41 years.

Russ Van Dyke was the second son of Anna Van Dyke. Raised on a farm in southwest Upland, Nebraska, he attended and graduated from the Upland Public School. Van Dyke started his career at a radio station in Hastings, Nebraska, as a disc jockey, newsman, and advertising salesman. After moving to South Dakota, he worked at radio stations WNAX in Yankton, and KELO in Sioux Falls.

In 1945, Van Dyke began his 36-year broadcast career in Iowa, as a newscaster for KRNT radio. Van Dyke transitioned to television and became an anchorman when television station KRNT (now KCCI) went on the air in 1955. He initially handled all of the news, including weather and sports. In the early days, he also did live commercials, including occasionally taking a long drink of Anderson Erickson milk on-air at the end of a newscast. During the 1960s and 1970s, under Van Dyke's leadership, KRNT/KCCI dominated the local news ratings, often drawing more than 50% of the TV news viewers in a Big Three market. Van Dyke remained the station's news anchor for 28 years. At the time of his retirement in 1983, he had the longest tenure of any news anchor in the United States, having made 2,700 newscasts on radio and 6,600 newscasts on TV. In 1955, Van Dyke was the chairman of the national Radio and Television News Director's Association. In 1977, he won the Jack Shelley Award, the highest honor awarded by the Iowa Broadcast News Association.

In addition to his duties as the anchor for daily news broadcasts, Van Dyke hosted the live public-opinion program What Do You Say? at 12:15 PM on weekdays. The program ran for 20 years, starting in the 1940s, and featured "man in the street" interviews. Over the course of its run, the program covered more than 5,000 topics. On television his program Special Report covered a single local news topic in depth, every Sunday night after the 10:00 PM newscast.

For many years, Van Dyke gave the daily TV weather reports standing behind a transparent map of the United States and writing upon it with a grease pencil. The map and Van Dyke were photographed from in front of the map, and the video was flipped electronically to prevent Van Dyke's writing from appearing backwards to the viewer. The text he read while delivering the forecast was written in white on the map, and it remained invisible to the viewer because the background behind the map was also white. The glass map, originally criticized by KRNT's general manager, was popular with viewers and remained in use for more than 20 years. It is now on display at the Iowa State Historical Society Building in Des Moines, with Van Dyke's handwriting still on it.

In the summer of 1987, Van Dyke moderated a Public Television debate on "Economics in America" between Joe Biden, Al Gore, Richard Gephardt, Jesse Jackson, Bruce Babbitt, Paul Simon and Michael Dukakis, who were running in the Democratic Party primary election for the 1988 United States presidential election.
