= KDSM =

KDSM may refer to:

- KDSM-TV, a television station (channel 17 physical/16 digital) licensed to Des Moines, Iowa, United States
- the ICAO code for Des Moines International Airport
- the Korea Defense Service Medal
