= KSXE =

KSXE may refer to:

- KSXE-LD, a low-power television station (channel 16) licensed to serve Sioux City, Iowa, United States; see List of television stations in Iowa
- KUFW (FM), a radio station (106.3 FM) licensed to serve Kingsburg, California, United States, which held the call sign KSXE in 2007
