= Justin Surrency =

American gridiron football player (born 1984)

No. 85
- Position: Wide receiver

Personal information
- Born: January 9, 1984 (age 42); St. Paul, Minnesota, U.S.
- Listed height: 6 ft 0 in (1.83 m)
- Listed weight: 182 lb (83 kg)

Career information
- College: Northern Iowa
- NFL draft: 2006: undrafted

Career history
- Seattle Seahawks (2006)*; Amsterdam Admirals (2007); Minnesota Vikings (2007–2008)*; Winnipeg Blue Bombers (2009)*
- * Offseason or practice squad member only

Awards and highlights
- 2x All-Gateway Conference (2004–2005)

Justin Surrency (born January 9, 1984) is an American former professional football wide receiver. He was signed by the Seattle Seahawks as an undrafted free agent in 2006. He played college football at Northern Iowa. Presently, he is a reporter/News presenter for WHO-TV in Des Moines, Iowa, and previously at WIBW-TV in Topeka, Kansas.

Surrency was also a member of the Amsterdam Admirals, Minnesota Vikings and Winnipeg Blue Bombers.
