= KFPX-TV =

Television station in Newton, Iowa

- Newton–Des Moines, Iowa; United States
- City: Newton, Iowa
- Channels: Digital: 36 (UHF); Virtual: 39

Programming
- Affiliations: 39.1: Ion Television; for others, see § Subchannels

Ownership
- Owner: Ion Media; (Ion Media License Company, LLC)

History
- First air date: August 31, 1998
- Former channel numbers: Analog: 39 (UHF, 1998–2009); Digital: 39 (UHF, 2009–2018)
- Call sign meaning: Pax (reflecting network's former branding)

Technical information
- Licensing authority: FCC
- Facility ID: 81509
- ERP: 270 kW
- HAAT: 564 m (1,850 ft)
- Transmitter coordinates: 41°48′35″N 93°37′17″W

Links
- Public license information: Public file; LMS
- Website: iontelevision.com

KFPX-TV (channel 39) is a television station licensed to Newton, Iowa, United States, broadcasting the Ion Television network to the Des Moines area. Owned by the Ion Media subsidiary of the E. W. Scripps Company, the station maintains offices on 114th Street in Urbandale, and its transmitter is located in Alleman, Iowa.

== History ==
The station began broadcasting on August 31, 1998; it was built and signed on by Paxson Communications as a charter station of the family-oriented Pax TV network (later reformatted into a general entertainment service as i: Independent Television, now Ion Television), with religious programming from The Worship Network airing during the overnight hours.

On September 24, 2020, the Cincinnati-based E. W. Scripps Company announced it would purchase KFPX-TV's owner, Ion Media, for $2.65 billion, with financing from Berkshire Hathaway. Part of the deal included divesting 23 stations nationally to Inyo Broadcast Holdings (then-undisclosed at the time of the announcement) that would maintain Ion affiliations.

== Newscasts ==
For a short time in 2001, KFPX ran a prime time newscast produced by NBC affiliate WHO-TV (channel 13) to compete with Fox affiliate KDSM-TV (channel 17)'s Fox News at Nine (which WHO eventually took over from CBS affiliate KGAN in Cedar Rapids). After that newscast was canceled, KFPX reran WHO-TV's 10 p.m. newscasts on a 30-minute delay until early 2005.

== Technical information ==
=== Subchannels ===
The station's signal is multiplexed:

Subchannels of KFPX-TV
Subchannel	Res.	Short name	Programming
39.1	720p	ION	Ion Television
39.2	480i	CourtTV	Court TV
39.3	480i	Laff	Laff
39.4	480i	Mystery	Ion Mystery
39.5	480i	IONPlus	Ion Plus
39.6	480i	BUSTED	Busted
39.7	480i	GameSho	Game Show Central
39.8	480i	HSN	HSN
39.9	480i	HSN2	HSN2

=== Analog-to-digital conversion ===
KFPX-TV shut down its analog signal, over UHF channel 39, on June 12, 2009, the official date on which full-power television stations in United States transitioned from analog to digital broadcasts under federal mandate. The station "flash-cut" its digital signal into operation UHF channel 39.

=== Former transmitter site ===
KFPX previously maintained transmitter facilities in Baxter, Iowa. Due to its short tower height, the station's broadcasting radius was largely confined to the immediate Des Moines area, although some southern and western suburbs may have had difficulty picking up the station's signal. Therefore, KFPX relied on cable and satellite carriage to reach the entire market. With the move to Alleman, KFPX now provides over-the-air coverage comparable to the market's other stations.
