= KGTV (Iowa) =

Television station in Des Moines, Iowa (1953–1955)

- Des Moines, Iowa; United States
- Channels: Analog: 17 (UHF)

Programming
- Affiliations: ABC, CBS, DuMont (1953–1955); Independent station (March–April 1955)

History
- First air date: November 15, 1953
- Last air date: April 15, 1955

Technical information
- ERP: 22.1 kW, authorized for up to 162 kW
- HAAT: 470 ft (143 m)
- Transmitter coordinates: 41°40′5″N 93°37′5″W

KGTV (channel 17) was a television station in Des Moines, Iowa, United States. Owned by Rib Mountain Radio of Wausau, Wisconsin, it operated from November 1953 to April 1955 as the first station in Des Moines itself and the second in central Iowa. KGTV maintained its studios and transmitter on 2nd Avenue near Hobson Drive, (Note: Now Northeast 60th Avenue) then to the north of the city limits.

As the market's only ultra high frequency (UHF) station, KGTV struggled economically at a time when not all television sets sold were able to tune to the new UHF band. While it provided relief to WOI-TV in Ames, until then the only network affiliate in the area, the arrival of WHO-TV on VHF channel 13 in 1954 and impending construction of KRNT-TV on channel 8 led to the suspension of operations. The station was unsuccessful in a multiple-year fight to have channel 11 reclassified from noncommercial to commercial for its use. In 1959, the Iowa State Patrol acquired its facilities for use as the control center of the state police radio network. KGTV's tower remained standing until 1981.

== History ==
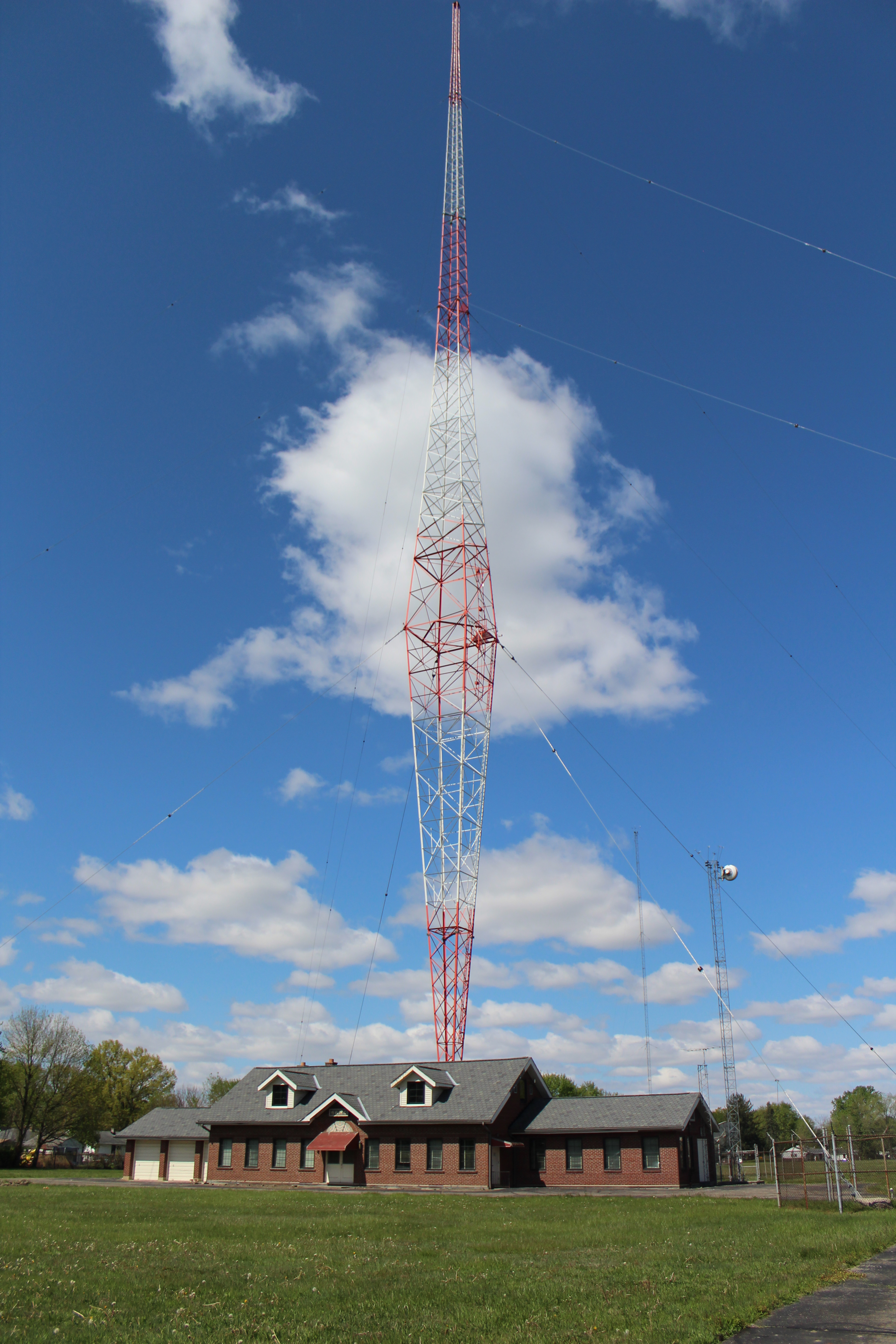
A Blaw-Knox diamond-shaped tower in Columbus, Ohio, similar to that used by KGTV

On February 5, 1953, Rib Mountain Radio, a Wausau, Wisconsin—based firm, applied to the Federal Communications Commission (FCC) for a permit to build a station on ultra high frequency (UHF) TV channel 17 in Des Moines. At the time, the area had one station, WOI-TV in Ames; Des Moines had been allocated two commercial very high frequency (VHF) channels, 8 and 13, each of which had competing applicants. With no opposition, Rib Mountain Radio received the permit on March 26, 1953. Construction plans took shape in August 1953, when the firm announced it had purchased land north of the Des Moines city limits and a building used as a house trailer factory to be converted to house KGTV. The tower had previously belonged to WHO radio. (Note: The tower itself was unusual and had a history preceding television. It was a Blaw-Knox diamond tower, commissioned by WHO in 1934, erected in 1936, and used until a new "tall tower" was built at WHO's site in Mitchellville, Iowa, in 1950.)

Channel 17 began broadcasting a test pattern on November 14, 1953, and programming the next day, after multiple postponements of its sign-on as crews rushed to finish the tower. KGTV was a basic affiliate of ABC and aired additional shows from the CBS and DuMont television networks. Its lineup of network shows included some popular offerings that WOI-TV passed on because of its policy of not accepting beer sponsors, such as Schlitz Playhouse of Stars, Person to Person, and CBS's Wednesday night boxing coverage. For local programming, channel 17 offered Rib Mountain Jamboree, a country music and dance show aired on Saturday evenings, as well as high school football and basketball telecasts.

In November 1954, Rib Mountain asked the FCC to let KGTV move to the reserved noncommercial channel 11 for at least three years, stating that being a UHF operation "severely handicapped" its commercial viability due to "general lack of interest and faith in UHF" among viewers and advertisers. A group planning educational television in Iowa opposed the proposal. When the FCC invited formal comment on the proposed channel change, it met with stiff opposition from backers of educational television, including Des Moines Public Schools. State education officials and Drake University were among other groups that lodged protests with the commission, which denied KGTV's request on a 4–3 vote in June 1956. The Des Moines public school system was granted a permit for channel 11 six months later.

KGTV dropped all of its network programs in March 1955, ceasing to air live shows fed by ABC and CBS in an attempt to save on interconnection costs it believed it could not afford. The station ceased broadcasting on April 15; in spite of what general manager Leo Howard called good public support, with nearly 70 percent of local sets converted to receive UHF, he said KGTV was never able to obtain sufficient network programming. Rib Mountain's secretary cited a decision by WOI-TV, owned by Iowa State College, to remain a commercial broadcaster instead of devoting itself to educational programming when sufficient private commercial stations were established. By the time it left the air, its original staff of 39 employees had dwindled to 11. After quitting telecasting, Rib Mountain was sued by RCA for $87,000 in payments owing on the station's equipment. A judge awarded RCA the money in April 1956.

In June 1959, the Iowa state government made an offer to buy the KGTV facility for $48,000 to be refitted as the control center for Iowa's state police radio system, which at the time operated from the Iowa State Fairgrounds. The Jo-Ben Corporation, owner of the property, accepted the offer; the transaction was completed in September, and police radio operations shifted to the site on December 14, 1959. The existing tower at the site remained at full height for more than 20 years. In 1979, a report by the State Patrol found that the tower was in imminent danger of collapsing during an ice storm event, in spite of emergency repairs completed two years prior. It was decided to dismantle the top 265 feet (81 m) of the tower and retain the lower 200-foot (61 m) section, while police radio shifted to three new towers constructed elsewhere. During the first attempt, in March 1980, a tower climber fell from the mast to his death. The work was restarted and completed in 1981 by a Waterloo firm.

== See also ==
- Morgan Murphy Media
- KDSM-TV
