= Betty Lou Varnum =

American television personality (1931–2021)

- Born: Betty Lou McVay; May 3, 1931; Chicago, Illinois
- Died: August 4, 2021
- Occupations: Television Personality, Producer, Director, Writer
- Spouse: James (Red) Varnum
- Children: 3

Betty Lou Varnum (née McVay; May 3, 1931 – August 2021) was an American television personality, best known as host of the long-running children's show, The Magic Window.

== Early years ==
Varnum was born in Chicago. Her parents, Glen and Louise McVay, moved to the small town of Platteville, Wisconsin later that same year. Her father was a popular local optometrist and sportsman and her mother was a housewife. The family lived in Platteville during WWII as McVay completed public school. After the war, McVay moved to Madison and attended the University of Wisconsin–Madison where she received a Bachelor of Arts degree in psychology with a minor in English literature. After graduation, McVay returned to her hometown, Platteville, and obtained a Bachelor of Science degree in teaching. She took a job teaching literature and speech at the high school in Port Washington, Wisconsin.

== Career ==
An acquaintance of McVay's who attended the University of Wisconsin, Platteville and worked at WOI-TV in Ames, Iowa suggested her as a host for a television show. In late 1954, after being contacted by WOI-TV managers, McVay left her teaching job and went to work in television. At that time, WOI-TV was owned and operated by Iowa State University and had just signed on the air on February 21, 1950. It was the first commercial television station in the United States to be owned by a major college. Although she had never been in a television studio before and had only been on the job for two days, McVay took over as host of The Magic Window, which would become America's longest-running local children's program.

The Magic Window ran continuously from 1951 through 1994. Betty Lou and the House with the Magic Window, as the show was later titled, was a children's show aimed at kindergarten and preschoolers that took place in the Magic Forest. McVay and her special friends, Gregory Lion (a perpetually four-year-old lion), Catrina Crocodile (a witch who had changed herself into a beautiful crocodile), and Dusty the Unicorn (more formally known as Stardust Glimmer, who was 3000 years old – young for a unicorn), would chat with visitors, teach a clever craft, and watch wholesome cartoons such as Felix the Cat and Tales of the Riverbank, a Canadian live-action short about Hammy the Hamster, Roderick the Rat, and friends. Although targeted at young children, The Magic Window would become a favorite of children of all ages as generations grew up with Betty Lou.

Varnum made only one appearance as an actress. She played Mrs. Vernam on an episode of The Rifleman that aired October 16, 1961; it was Season 4 Episode 3.

Varnum worked on other projects at WOI-TV and became the motive force behind many significant public affairs and entertainment shows. Among the first in her field, she hosted a local talk show, Dimension 5, which ran on Tuesday evenings starting at 10:30 PM and ending when all of the viewers' questions were answered and the panel members had expressed their views – often causing the show to run into the early hours of the morning. Dimension 5 addressed the controversial topics of the day with shows featuring Medal of Honor-winners, Nobel Prize-winners, the American Indian Movement, women's rights, gay and lesbian rights, and many others. Varnum also produced and hosted the award-winning Status 6, which focused on the struggles of the handicapped in Iowa, for which she received the McCall's Golden Mike Award for Women in Radio and Television in 1965. In the mid-1970s, she conceived and hosted Stringers Newscast, a show that featured film shorts and animations produced by the viewing public.

Varnum also hosted the yearly Iowa State Fair and VEISHEA parades.

Varnum retired in 1994 when WOI-TV was purchased by a commercial company. During her 40-year career, Varnum received endless recognition and awards for her pioneering work in the television industry and as a woman in the early days of local broadcasting.

== Personal life and death ==
In 1959, McVay married James (Red) Varnum, also an employee at WOI-TV. Red worked as a backstage designer, producer, director and writer and appeared in a number of shows including The Red Dash and Gravesend Manor. It was rumored that Red was the voice of one of the puppets in The Magic Window, but neither Betty Lou nor Red ever confirmed this.

Betty Lou Varnum died in August 2021.

== See also ==
- The Magic Window, her first, longest-running and most popular show
- WOI-TV
