= Pete Taylor (sportscaster) =

American sportscaster (1945–2003)

Pete Taylor (April 1, 1945 in Des Moines, Iowa – March 5, 2003 in Iowa City, Iowa) was a radio and television sportscaster who worked for radio station KRNT and television station KCCI in Des Moines, Iowa. Taylor also served as the play-by-play announcer for Iowa State University football and men's basketball.

== Voice of the Cyclones ==
Taylor began his association with Iowa State in 1970, covering Cyclone events for KRNT radio as KRNT's (later KCCI) television sports director. Taylor was chosen Iowa Sportscaster of the Year four times during his career as the director of Des Moines' top-rated news telecast from 1969–90. In 1984, Iowa State signed a contract for exclusive broadcast rights for all sporting events with Clear Channel Communications. Taylor was picked alongside color man and partner Eric Heft, forming the broadcast tandem that covered 24 years of basketball and 19 years of football.

Taylor worked 22 years as sports director at KCCI-TV prior to joining the Iowa State staff. In 1990, Taylor left KCCI to work full-time at Iowa State as director of athletic fundraising. He later was promoted to associate athletic director, serving as the department's liaison with men's basketball, football, the car program and special projects. Taylor also devoted time to Cyclone Club activities, including outings and banquets, and oversaw media relations and radio and television contracts.

In all, Taylor's contributions to Iowa State spanned four decades. He also hosted the football coach's TV Show, Cyclone Replay Show and radio call-in shows for both football and men's basketball.

== Death ==
Taylor died March 5, 2003 at the age of 57 in the University Hospitals in Iowa City after a brain hemorrhage following surgery to treat complications from a stroke.

== Personal ==
Taylor was a 1963 graduate of Theodore Roosevelt High School in Des Moines, IA and a 1967 graduate of the University of Iowa, where he participated in baseball. He was known as a fan of funk and hip-hop music. He was survived by his mother Modesta, daughter Jill, son David and grandchildren Charlie, Lucy, Sam and Henry. He married his high school sweetheart (the former Susan Williams) in 1966 (while they were students at University of Iowa) in Iowa City, IA.
