= The Magic Window =

- promotional photo of Betty Lou Varnum in The House with the Magic Window
- Starring: Betty Lou Varnum
- Country of origin: United States

Production
- Running time: 30 minutes per episode

Original release
- Network: ABC affiliate WOI-TV, Ames, Iowa
- Release: 1951 – 1994

The Magic Window (also known as The House with the Magic Window) is an American children's television program broadcast on ABC affiliate WOI-TV in Ames, Iowa, from 1951 to 1994. With a run of 43 years, it is the longest-running children's television program in American history. (Bozo's Circus technically had a longer run; however, it was made in many different local markets by different producers.) Producer Dick Hartzell and WOI TV artist Joy (Ringham) Munn developed the show as an educational children's program, which featured handicraft activities, news items, and birthday recognition for the children viewing the show. Joy co-hosted the show with Craighton Knau for the first season (1951-1952), which was 30 minutes long and aired 3 times per week. During the second season, she became the sole host of the program. For that season the show was 15 minutes long and aired 5 days per week. Joy left the show in 1953. For all but the first three years of the show, it was hosted by Betty Lou Varnum, another pioneer in central-Iowa broadcasting.

Betty Lou Varnum, who is best known for The Magic Window, but was versatile enough to host such other shows as a teen dance party, election coverage, and a call in 'issues' show, hosted the show, along with a cast of puppets such as Gregory Lion, Dusty the Unicorn, and Catrina Crocodile. The heart of the show was Betty Lou teaching kids a new craft each episode (using kid-safe items such as construction paper, safety scissors, and cellophane tape). The puppets would help out by opening the curtain to the screen on which various featurettes were shown. These included episodes from Tales of the Riverbank, Felix the Cat, and a series called "Let's Be Friends" which introduced viewers to a child from another city or country, sharing their culture and lifestyle.

== See also ==
- The Floppy Show - another popular central-Iowa children's show of the same time period
