= KDSM-TV =

Television station in Des Moines, Iowa

ATSC 3.0 station
- Des Moines, Iowa; United States
- Channels: Digital: 16 (UHF); Virtual: 17
- Branding: Fox 17

Programming
- Affiliations: 17.1: Fox; for others, see § Subchannels

Ownership
- Owner: Sinclair Broadcast Group; (KDSM Licensee, LLC)

History
- Founded: September 13, 1982
- First air date: March 7, 1983
- Former call signs: KCBR (1983–1986)
- Former channel numbers: Analog: 17 (UHF, 1983–2009)
- Former affiliations: Independent (1983–1986); UPN (secondary, 1995–1998)
- Call sign meaning: Des Moines (also the IATA airport code for Des Moines International Airport)

Technical information
- Licensing authority: FCC
- Facility ID: 56527
- ERP: 1,000 kW
- HAAT: 612 m (2,008 ft)
- Transmitter coordinates: 41°49′48″N 93°36′54.6″W

Links
- Public license information: Public file; LMS
- Website: kdsm17.com

KDSM-TV (channel 17) is a television station in Des Moines, Iowa, United States, affiliated with the Fox network. The station is owned by Sinclair Broadcast Group and has studios on Fleur Drive in Des Moines; its transmitter is located in Alleman, Iowa.

Channel 17 began broadcasting as KCBR, Des Moines's first independent station, on March 7, 1983. It was locally owned by the Independence Broadcasting Company. It was purchased by Duchossois Communications in 1985. Under Duchossois, the station changed its call sign to KDSM-TV in 1986, affiliated with the then-new Fox network, and became the local broadcaster of syndicated Iowa Hawkeyes men's basketball, which dramatically boosted its visibility and regional cable carriage. River City Broadcasting acquired KDSM-TV in 1990 and boosted its promotion of Fox programming. It soon surpassed ABC affiliate WOI-TV, long the market's distant third-rated station, in total revenue.

After River City merged with Sinclair in 1996, KDSM began broadcasting a local newscast in 2001. The newscast was presented from Sinclair-owned KGAN in Cedar Rapids using Des Moines–based news staff. In 2008, this was replaced with a local newscast produced by WHO-DT (channel 13); in 2026, KCCI (channel 8) began supplying the newscast. KDSM became the market's ATSC 3.0 (NextGen TV) broadcaster in 2023.

== History ==
Channel 17 was the second television channel to be activated in central Iowa, nearly 30 years before the present station. KGTV was the first station in Des Moines itself; it operated from November 1953 to April 1955, when it folded amid economic struggles inherent in early UHF broadcasting. Two parties expressed interest in the channel in the two decades after the station folded. In 1966, Stoner Television Company of Des Moines filed to build and operate channel 17, and in 1970, the permittees of unbuilt station KWIG sought to change their assignment from channel 63 to channel 17.

=== KCBR: Early years ===
In April 1979, Koplar Broadcasting of St. Louis announced its intention to build a new independent station on channel 17 to serve Des Moines. Koplar proposed to model the station, which it called KRBK, after its successful KPLR-TV in St. Louis. The next month, the Independence Broadcasting Company—owned by Raymond Gazzo, William Trout, and Carl Goldsberry of Des Moines—made an application of its own. Goldsberry was a Northwestern Bell yellow pages sales representative, while Trout and Gazzo were partners in a Des Moines law firm. The looming fight of Koplar versus Independence was compared by Evan Roth of the Des Moines Tribune to a "David and Goliath" contest. The Federal Communications Commission (FCC) designated their applications as well as bids from Greater Des Moines Vision Ltd. and Columbia Iowa TV Ltd. for comparative hearing on March 13, 1981.

In April 1982, an FCC administrative law judge awarded channel 17 to Independence Broadcasting, not long after the four applicants reached a settlement agreement by which Independence reimbursed them for their expenses. The company initially selected a downtown studio site on 3rd Street, but by October it had instead found space in a building on Park Avenue.

A mild and wet winter caused difficulties with construction of the station's tower at Alleman. Construction equipment bogged down in muddy terrain. KCBR had initially set a January 17, 1983, start date, but the tower construction company started work two months late; by early January, the tower had reached less than half its planned height. Channel 17 broadcast for the first time on the afternoon of March 7, 1983; its official sign-on was a week later, on March 14. KCBR offered viewers a schedule of movies, syndicated and children's shows, and sports, as well as two locally produced public affairs shows.

Independence Broadcasting reached a $9 million deal in late October 1984 to sell KCBR to Citadel Communications, a company owned by East Coast investors led by former Corinthian Broadcasting president Philip Lombardo. The transaction fell apart, leading Independence to sue Citadel for breach of contract in late December.

=== KDSM: Duchossois and River City ownership ===
After the failure of the Citadel sale attempt, Independence agreed to sell KCBR for $8.3 million to Duchossois Communications of Lafayette, Indiana, in February 1985. Duchossois owned radio stations in Lafayette and in Duluth, Minnesota, but this was its first venture into television. Its parent company—Duchossois Enterprises, owned by Richard L. Duchossois—was associated with various industrial companies and the Arlington Park race track near Chicago.

Duchossois moved the station out of its existing studios and to a former NCR building on Fleur Drive. This gave channel 17 in-house production facilities instead of relying on a truck as it had for its first two years. On January 17, 1986, KCBR changed its call sign to KDSM-TV as part of an upgrade in the station's on-air image. The station joined the new Fox network when it launched that October.

In 1987, KDSM-TV scored a coup when it won the Des Moines–area rights to telecast live Iowa Hawkeyes men's basketball and replays of Iowa Hawkeyes football, displacing WHO-TV. It had already secured the central Iowa rights to syndicated Big Ten Conference football and basketball, making it the television home for all Hawkeye athletic events that did not air on Big Three networks or cable. The deal with the Hawkeyes was instantly seen as giving channel 17 increased credibility in the market. Iowa basketball was among the most popular syndicated programs anywhere in the country at the time; to complement the Hawkeyes, under general manager Tommy Thompson, channel 17 acquired the rights to telecast the state high school basketball tournaments and by 1991 was producing coverage of the boys' tournament for statewide broadcast. These acquisitions increased the station's cable footprint, as systems in fringe areas beyond metro Des Moines added channel 17 for its sports telecasts. Under Duchossois, KDSM-TV increased its share of advertising revenue in the Des Moines market from six percent in 1985 to eleven to fourteen percent in 1990.

River City Broadcasting of St. Louis agreed to purchase KDSM-TV for $13.5 million in November 1990; the buyers touted their ability to buy for KDSM and other stations they owned and to upgrade the station's on-air look using equipment at its flagship station, KDNL-TV. River City took over in July 1991 and dismissed Thompson two months later; Thompson claimed River City effectively fired him by making changes to his employment agreement. One of River City's major moves was to "Fox-ify" the station's image and aggressively promote its network affiliation. This included hiring on-air hosts for the station's Fox 17 Kids Club, increasing community involvement, and commissioning an artist to paint a mural of Fox network stars in the station's lobby.

Beginning in 1995, KDSM served as a secondary affiliate of the new UPN network, airing its shows in late-night hours. In 1998, the station discontinued its carriage of UPN programming, citing increasing demands of Fox sports programming. It picked up Star Trek: Voyager the next year when it went into syndication.

=== Sinclair ownership ===
On April 11, 1996, River City announced that it would merge with the Sinclair Broadcast Group for $2.3 billion, creating a company with 29 television and 34 radio stations nationwide. The transaction valued KDSM at between $35 million and $45 million, roughly triple its value compared to the purchase price River City paid in 1991. By 1996, the station was believed to have surpassed WOI-TV, the city's third-rated station and an ABC affiliate, in revenue by a significant margin. Its costs were kept low by the lack of a news department and new network affiliation agreements in the industry that made it harder for Big Three affiliates to bid on sports packages like Iowa basketball. Big Ten Conference basketball, including the Hawkeyes, remained on the station through 2007, when the Big Ten Network cable channel launched. KDSM began broadcasting a digital signal on April 19, 2002, and joined WHO in shutting off analog broadcasts on the original transition date of February 17, 2009; the station's digital signal remained on its pre-transition UHF channel 16, using virtual channel 17.

KDSM-TV was taken off air for all viewers except those on local cable systems for a time in May 2019 after a failure in its transmission line. WHO-TV provided transmission facilities to restore an over-the-air signal. During repairs on the mast, a worker fell from a height of 1,000 feet (300 m) to his death.

== Newscasts ==
As early as 1990, KDSM-TV considered introducing a 9 p.m. newscast, and management under Duchossois and River City mulled the possibility for several years. Tom MacArthur, who ran the station under River City, chafed at the fact that advertising agencies often refused to buy advertising for agricultural products outside of newscasts, which his station lacked.

By 1998, Fox was steering affiliates to add newscasts, leading to planning to debut a local news program on channel 17. In March 2001, Sinclair-owned KGAN in Cedar Rapids began producing a 9 p.m. newscast for KDSM-TV. The program was presented by KGAN's news team using reporters based in the Des Moines area. It competed with a new 9 p.m. newscast from WHO-TV produced for Pax station KFPX-TV. After KGAN began providing services to Cedar Rapids Fox affiliate KFXA in 2002, the program was renamed to Fox News at Nine and began to air in Eastern Iowa that October.

The regional newscast from Cedar Rapids was replaced in September 2008 with a new nightly local newscast produced by WHO-TV. The new 13 News at 9 on Fox 17 was an hour long on weeknights, whereas the KGAN-produced program was only half an hour long. This newscast became exclusive to WHO's streaming platforms on January 1, 2026, and was replaced on KDSM by a newscast from KCCI (channel 8).

== Technical information ==
=== Subchannels ===
The station's ATSC 1.0 channels are carried on the multiplexed signals of other Des Moines television stations as part of Des Moines's ATSC 3.0 (NextGen TV) deployment plan:

Subchannels provided by KDSM-TV (ATSC 1.0)
Subchannel	Res.	Short name	Programming	ATSC 1.0 host
17.1	720p	Fox	Fox	WHO-DT
17.2	480i	Comet	Comet	KDIN-TV
17.3	480i	Charge!	Charge!	KDIN-TV
17.4	480i	ROAR	Roar	KCCI

In exchange, KDSM-TV broadcasts the main subchannels of KCCI, Iowa PBS, and WHO-DT alongside its own. The station began ATSC 3.0 broadcasting on March 28, 2023. Its transmitter is located in Alleman, Iowa.

Subchannels of KDSM-TV (ATSC 3.0)
Subchannel	Res.	Short name	Programming
8.1	1080p	KCCI	CBS (KCCI)
11.1	1080p	KDIN	PBS (KDIN-TV)
13.1	1080p	WHO	NBC (WHO-DT)
17.1	720p	KDSM	Fox
17.10	1080p	T2	T2
17.11	1080p	PBTV	Pickleballtv
17.20		GMLOOP	GameLoop
17.21		ROXi	ROXi

Subchannel broadcast with digital rights management
Subchannel streamed via the internet
