= The Floppy Show =

- Duane, Floppy and friends in the 1980s
- Genre: Children's programming
- Presented by: Duane Ellett
- Country of origin: United States
- Original language: English

Production
- Camera setup: Multi-camera
- Running time: 25 mins.

Original release
- Network: NBC affiliate WHO-TV
- Release: 1957 – 1987

The Floppy Show is an American children's television series starring Duane Ellett, broadcast on NBC affiliate WHO-TV in Des Moines, Iowa from 1957 to 1987. Ellett created Floppy in early 1957 to help teach people how to take care of their pets on the TV show Pet Corner, before moving on to their own show.

== Overview ==
Duane Ellett entertained children with his puppet friend Floppy, a high-voiced beagle that enjoyed riddles and let kids beep his nose for luck. Ellett had carved Floppy himself from balsa wood, and brought him and his other puppet characters to life through self-taught ventriloquism.

Duane Ellett and Floppy went on the air June 9, 1957. Prior to the show, Ellett had served in the U.S. Army in World War II. He had planned to become a lawyer when he started attending Drake University, but a class in radio journalism led to a job with WHO radio in 1947.

In the 1970s and 1980s, the half-hour show consisted of short sketches with Ellett's puppets, a segment in which children asked Floppy riddles, and the airing of vintage Looney Tunes and Tom and Jerry cartoons. Ellett also took Floppy on 200 personal appearances every year.

On August 30, 1984, WHO-TV canceled Ellett's afternoon show because of faltering ratings. Ellett and Floppy continued to appear on WHO's noon news and on weekend mornings. Ellett died in 1987.

The riddle that children most often asked of Floppy on the show was, "Why did the man put the car in the oven?" And the answer almost always was, "Because he wanted a hot-rod." Floppy never got it right and he never tired of hearing it.

== Specials and DVD release ==
Since the show's cancellation, WHO-TV has aired the Floppy Christmas Special, produced in 1966 on Christmas Eve. The special features the adventures of Floppy escaping the daily grind of his afternoon show. There are currently four DVDs released in the Duane and Floppy series.

== Legacy ==
In 1994, a special display honoring Ellett and his puppet was exhibited at the Iowa Historical Building, where Floppy now resides. In 2013, it was announced that the Iowa State Historical Society was intending to put the puppet in storage. The display will be taken down on June 9, 2013. This date also happens to be Floppy's 56th "birthday". A Facebook group called "Save Floppy!" created an online petition to keep the original version of the Floppy area on public display. As of July, 2013 Museum spokesman Jeff Morgan was noncommittal about restoring the Floppy exhibit to public display, saying, "Right now the museum's just beginning to help determine what the exhibit rotations will be in the long term."

The Iowa State Historical Society presented a retrospective "Duane and Floppy Film Festival" in 2009 and again in 2010.

On August 6, 2013, it was announced that Floppy would be on display at the 2013 Iowa State Fair from August 8 to the 18th. As of 2015, Floppy now resides at the Ankeny Area Historical Society's museum.

== See also ==
- The Magic Window - another popular central-Iowa children's show of the same time period
- Fran Allison - Iowa native in children's TV programming 1947-1957
