= WOI-DT =

Television station in Ames, Iowa

- Ames–Des Moines, Iowa; United States
- City: Ames, Iowa
- Channels: Digital: 5 (VHF); Virtual: 5
- Branding: Local 5; Local 5 News

Programming
- Affiliations: 5.1: ABC; for others, see § Subchannels

Ownership
- Owner: Tegna Inc., a subsidiary of Nexstar Media Group; (Tegna Broadcast Holdings, LLC)
- Sister stations: KCWI-TV; Nexstar: WHO-DT

History
- First air date: February 21, 1950
- Former call signs: WOI-TV (1950–2009)
- Former channel numbers: Analog: 4 (VHF, 1950–1953), 5 (VHF, 1953–2009); Digital: 59 (UHF, 2002–2009)
- Former affiliations: NBC (1950–1954); CBS (1950–1955); DuMont (secondary, 1950–1955)
- Call sign meaning: Taken from WOI radio

Technical information
- Licensing authority: FCC
- Facility ID: 8661
- ERP: 13.9 kW
- HAAT: 566 m (1,857 ft)
- Transmitter coordinates: 41°48′33″N 93°36′54″W
- Translator(s): KCWI-TV 5.5 (23.5 UHF) Ames; 33 (UHF) Des Moines

Links
- Public license information: Public file; LMS
- Website: www.weareiowa.com

WOI-DT (channel 5) is a television station licensed to Ames, Iowa, United States, serving the Des Moines area as an affiliate of ABC. It is owned by the Tegna subsidiary of Nexstar Media Group alongside CW station KCWI-TV (channel 23); Nexstar also owns NBC affiliate WHO-DT (channel 13). WOI-DT and KCWI-TV share studios on Westown Parkway in West Des Moines; WOI-DT's transmitter is located in Alleman, Iowa.

WOI-TV was Iowa's second television station and the first TV station owned by an educational institution when it was built by Iowa State College, now Iowa State University (ISU); it signed on February 21, 1950, on channel 4. It operated from studios on the campus in Ames. The foresight of president Charles E. Friley to expand Iowa State's long-running WOI radio station into television led to a very early application and allowed the college to beat a years-long freeze on new TV stations. While WOI-TV was intended as an educational service and aired college courses, agricultural extension programs, and the long-running children's show The Magic Window, the freeze left it the only TV station in central Iowa, and the Iowa Board of Regents allowed it to accept national network programming and advertising. After the freeze, WOI-TV was moved to channel 5, and two new stations sprang up in Des Moines: WHO-TV in 1954 and KRNT-TV (now KCCI) in 1955. These stations took NBC and CBS programming, respectively, along with local news viewership and considerable advertising business. While the Board of Regents permitted WOI-TV to accept local advertising in 1955, it did not employ its own advertising sales representatives and purposely throttled the operation to avoid allegations of unfair competition. These and other factors left the station in a very distant third place in central Iowa news ratings for decades.

Debate over the privatization of state government functions renewed the long-touchy question of WOI-TV's operational status in the mid-1980s. In 1987, WOI-TV was placed under separate management within the university and encouraged to turn a profit. The sales force was expanded and some of the news staff moved to Des Moines to improve the station's competitive standing, but ratings failed to meaningfully rise, and increased revenues came in below projections. In 1991, ISU president Martin C. Jischke recommended WOI-TV be sold, in spite of a down market for commercial TV stations. This was opposed by local residents who felt that WOI-TV was a resource to ISU and a valuable training ground for broadcast professionals. The bidding process was partly mishandled, leading the original winning bidder to withdraw from the process. The regents agreed to a $14 million offer from Citadel Communications in 1992; Citadel overcame an adverse ruling in court and an attempt by the Iowa legislature to stop the transaction and took control on February 28, 1994. It chose not to rehire 20 employees, canceled The Magic Window, and began migrating station operations and some newscast production to Des Moines. In 1998, the entire station relocated to the present studios in West Des Moines. In spite of multiple rebrands and efforts to improve the news product, WOI continued to find itself a very distant third in the ratings and struggled to change viewers' perceptions of the station.

Citadel sold its Iowa stations to Nexstar Broadcasting Group in 2013. Under Nexstar, the station rebranded again as Local 5 in 2015. It also gained a duopoly partner when the company closed on its purchase of KCWI-TV in 2016. When Nexstar acquired Tribune Media in 2019, it opted to retain the higher-rated WHO and sold WOI and KCWI to Tegna. Nexstar merged with Tegna in 2026 and was granted a waiver to retain all three stations, but a subsequent court-ordered injunction has barred further integration.

== Iowa State University ownership ==
=== Construction and freeze-era operation ===
Iowa State College's involvement in broadcasting had dated to the earliest days of the medium. An amateur radio station had been set up in 1914, which turned into a full broadcasting station on November 21, 1921. Known initially as 9YL, it received the call sign WOI in April 1922. Originally part of the electrical engineering department, it became part of the college proper in 1925 and a major source of educational, agricultural, and sports information in the state.

Under president Charles E. Friley, in 1944, the college formed a commission to investigate the possibilities in the new medium of television. On February 13, 1945, it applied to the Federal Communications Commission (FCC) for a construction permit for a new commercial (Note: The history cards and Broadcasting magazine on April 9, 1945, list the application as for a commercial station, though some later sources said the station was noncommercial.) television station to operate on channel 3, 66–72 MHz, in Ames, Iowa. The commission granted this application on September 19, 1946, by which time that channel had been redesignated channel 4.

The timing of events beyond Iowa made the WOI-TV construction permit of extra importance to central Iowa. In October 1948, the FCC declared a freeze on grants for new television stations. Only two permits had been granted in Iowa before the freeze, for WOI-TV and WOC-TV in Davenport. Even so, not even "a nickel" had been appropriated to build the station, per a college spokesman as of December 1948. A major step came in July 1949, when WOI-FM began broadcasting on 90.1 MHz from a new 580-foot (180 m) tower. By November, about half the equipment had arrived at the Iowa State College campus and the tower south of campus. The first test pattern was broadcast January 24, 1950, as was a film. On February 21, 1950, WOI-TV made its first regular broadcast. It was the first station in Central Iowa, the second in Iowa (after WOC-TV), and the 100th in the United States. Of equal significance, it was the first television station licensed to a college.

Iowa State was engaged in the war effort, producing uranium for the Manhattan Project, and received a 5-percent overhead on money used for war research; this money is known to have been a funding source for the station. This money also was used to fund the purchase of scientific equipment by the college.

No time selling arrangement for WOI-TV should be made with any local company, sponsor, individual or organization within the specific area covered by WOI-TV or in the state of Iowa.

— WOI-TV advertising policy, 1951

From the beginning, WOI-TV was a different kind of venture from the WOI radio stations. State officials believed that the state-owned radio stations should not compete with commercial outlets and thus ran them on a non-commercial basis. However, WOI-TV found itself in an unusual position. The four national television networks—ABC, CBS, DuMont, and NBC—had no other outlet for their programs in Ames or Des Moines, and the station held affiliations with all of them when it launched. On September 30, 1950, the station began presenting network programs live. The Iowa state board of education adopted a "semi-commercial" posture to the operation of WOI-TV, initially as a stopgap. It allowed the station to take in revenue from national advertising contained in network programs, but the station was not permitted to sell ad time to Iowa businesses or have local time sales representatives. The concept was to create an income source for additional equipment and improvements for WOI-TV's operation. The station also barred some categories of national advertisers, notably beer and wine; dairy farmers protested when it aired margarine spots. At the time the semi-commercial policy was adopted, the posture was that this would last until TV stations were established in Des Moines, at which time WOI-TV would become a non-commercial service like its sister stations. In spite of the restrictions placed on advertising, WOI-TV turned an operating profit in 1951—primarily derived from income from network programming—all of which was offset by capital expenditures. Among these was a studio-transmitter link to connect the transmitter with the Service Building on the Iowa State campus so that equipment could be moved from the transmitter site to the same building as WOI radio. The station moved from the Service Building to Exhibit Hall on the Iowa State campus in 1952.

=== After the freeze: New channel number, new competition ===
The years-long FCC freeze on new station applications ended April 14, 1952, with major changes to television allocations, including the addition of ultra high frequency (UHF) channels to the existing 12 in the very high frequency (VHF) band and new station spacing requirements. The FCC's order had two immediate repercussions for WOI-TV. It reaffirmed that the station was a commercial license by failing to reserve the channel for educational broadcasting. It made a total of 30 changes to the channels of existing stations, including WOI-TV, which would be moved from channel 4 to channel 5. This change was carried out in June 1953. The station left channel 4 after its June 26 broadcasts with the intention of returning the next day on channel 5 at double the effective radiated power. Instead, technicians battled unexpected setbacks in the installation of a new antenna, including a broken winch and damage as it was raised to its position atop the tower. In the heat of the Iowa summer, sightseers jammed local roads to watch the work be done; the station returned to the air on June 29. On January 30, 1954, WOI-TV boosted its power again to the maximum of 100,000 watts.

The end of the freeze also meant television stations for Des Moines. The first of these was in the new UHF band: KGTV (channel 17), which debuted on November 15, 1953, as a basic affiliate of ABC plus additional shows from CBS and DuMont. Its lineup of network shows included some popular offerings that WOI-TV passed on because of its policy of not accepting beer sponsors, such as Schlitz Playhouse of Stars, Person to Person, and CBS's Wednesday night boxing coverage. In April 1954, WHO-TV (channel 13) signed on as an NBC affiliate, taking with it the NBC shows WOI-TV had been carrying. KGTV quit airing network programming in March 1955 before going off the air altogether the next month; its owner, Rib Mountain Radio, in part blamed WOI-TV's continued commercial operation. The other commercial VHF channel for the city was activated in July 1955 by KRNT-TV (channel 8, now KCCI); it was a full CBS affiliate, making WOI-TV a full ABC affiliate except for beer-sponsor programs. The station also retained its affiliation with DuMont, which ceased its existence as a network later that year.

With WOI-TV now one of three VHF stations, each with its own network affiliation, serving central Iowa viewers, the Iowa Board of Regents approved on November 11, 1955, that WOI-TV continue to operate on a commercial basis. Citing the need for a steady income source for the station, the board removed the local advertising restriction but retained the bar on alcoholic beverage sponsors. The station had been taking advertising from "regional" accounts that included Iowa and other states. The Board of Regents's decision was met poorly by Iowa's private commercial broadcasters. The Iowa Broadcasters Association called on the state to defund WOI-TV, and the chairman of the Iowa Democratic Party suggested selling WOI-TV to private interests and using the proceeds to build out a state-owned educational television network. While WHO-TV and KRNT-TV became major competitors, WOI-TV suffered financially. It lost money in four consecutive fiscal years, further exacerbated by its schedule of educational broadcasts, which did not generate revenue. Iowa State College was renamed Iowa State University of Science and Technology (ISU) on July 4, 1959.

=== Educational programming on WOI-TV ===
As a unit of Iowa State, WOI-TV also served as an educational broadcaster in a role different from many commercial stations. Farm service programming made an appearance as early as the first night, when a demonstration of DDT was featured. Its first live telecast was a VEISHEA event on the campus. Much of the earliest programming distributed by the Educational Television and Radio Center, forerunner to National Educational Television, came from WOI-TV, which had received grants to produce 51 hours of educational programs by November 1952 and nearly 100 hours by 1954.

In 1953, college courses for credit debuted; offerings over the first three years ranged from Humanities 111 to Education 555, with as many as 58 students completing each course. Non-credit courses on topics such as European history, chemistry, and agricultural extension were also telecast. In 1960, WOI-TV began airing freshman math courses. The next year, it assumed a new off-air role as the hub of closed-circuit television instruction at Iowa State University for classes such as mathematics and veterinary anatomy.

For younger audiences, in 1952, WOI-TV and the Iowa Joint Committee on Educational Television debuted Iowa TV Schooltime, a daily half-hour of educational programming for elementary school students. Schooltime was distributed by kinescope to other stations beginning in 1956. WOI also offered children a non-educational show, The House with the Magic Window, which debuted in 1951 and beginning in 1954 was hosted by Betty Lou Varnum. The Magic Window—which featured cartoons, short films, and crafts—moved from a weekday midday slot, surrounded by soap operas, to weekends in 1985.

WOI-TV's existence as a commercial broadcaster owned by a state agency caused a long-running feud with the Internal Revenue Service (IRS). The federal government ruled in 1953 that its income was subject to taxation. The Board of Regents contested this maneuver for years, though in the late 1960s it reached an out-of-court settlement by which WOI-TV paid income taxes through 1965 and filed annual tax returns, without paying, for subsequent years. In 1974, the United States Court of Claims found that WOI-TV's income was taxable as an "unrelated business" from which ISU could not deduct expenses of the WOI radio stations.

The role of WOI-TV in educational broadcasting progressively diminished. KDPS-TV (channel 11), an educational TV station owned by Des Moines Public Schools, went into service in April 1959. The 1967 Iowa General Assembly created a statewide educational TV network; two years later, KDPS-TV was purchased and renamed KDIN-TV to serve as the key station of the Iowa Educational Broadcasting Services network. In 1975, an Iowa state representative introduced a bill proposing that WOI-TV be sold and the educational network move from Des Moines to Ames.

=== New facilities, same problems ===
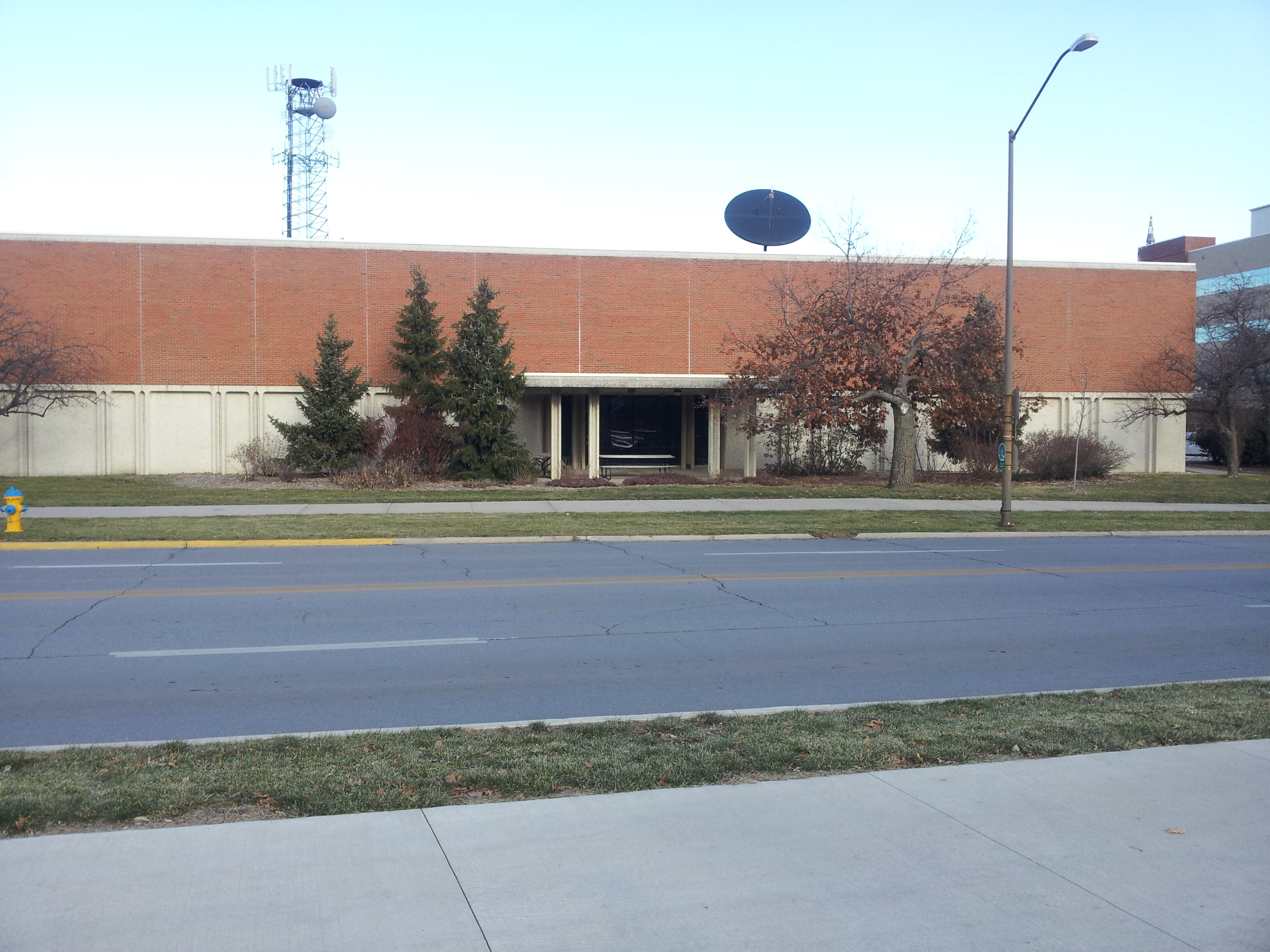
The Communications Building at ISU was paid for with WOI-TV funds and housed the station from 1964 to 1997.

WOI radio and television were scattered across several facilities by the early 1960s, with the art department behind Blackshear Hall, the radio stations still in the Service Building, and WOI-TV still in Exhibit Hall. In 1960, the regents approved a contract for architectural plans for a new Communications Building to house the entire WOI operation. The structure, financed without state funds and paid for by WOI-TV profits, opened in 1964. In addition to offering 25 percent more floor space than WOI had in its separate facilities, the TV station moved from one small studio to two larger ones. In 1968, the Board of Regents rescinded the ban on beer advertising.

The station generated losses for tax purposes as a result of the university's adoption of unusual accounting methods—particularly the lack of normal depreciation of assets—and sharing of expenses with WOI radio. When ISU began planning for a new WOI-TV tower—to be shared with WHO-TV and KDIN-TV—in 1971, it planned to pay for the tower out of its endowment. A 1973 audit of the station, the first conducted by the state, criticized a "lack of internal control ... and deficiencies", to which general manager Robert Mulhall responded by highlighting the incompatibility of accounting principles common to the television industry with those typically used for government agencies.

When you are a public institution, and you have an operating arm that is customarily considered to be a private-enterprise mechanism, you always have to be conscious of the criticism that might occur if you become too commercially aggressive.

— W. Robert Parks, president, Iowa State University, on why WOI-TV was underdeveloped in the area of sales

Another issue endemic to WOI-TV's operation—and with a negative impact on its revenue—was that its advertising sales operation was deliberately stunted. In 1971, the station still had no local sales representatives and captured between 12 and 14 percent of the local advertising market—leaving the remainder to the other two local stations. By 1983, while it still employed no sales representatives, a national company sold local and regional advertising under contract for the station with two employees in Des Moines. In comparison, WHO-TV had six full-time sales representatives. This arrangement was adopted to mollify private competition and those who felt a state agency should not compete with private enterprise. This caused revenue to lag. KCCI had revenue of $7 million in 1981; WOI-TV only garnered $4 million in that year.

These issues were exacerbated by the poor audience acceptance of WOI-TV's local news and public affairs programming. Even though ABC network shows drew an audience, that audience often departed in droves for WHO or KCCI. WOI-TV operations coordinator Robert Helmers noted, "There's one loud click out there at 10 o'clock, and they're not landing on channel 5." The 10 p.m. newscast averaged a share of between 8 and 13 percent of the audience; the 6 p.m. news had been moved to 5 p.m. to avoid competition; and the noon newscast was dropped. Researchers found that high turnover in on-air personnel—possibly bolstered by a national pension plan that gave lump-sum payments to employees who quit before their fifth year—and the perception of WOI-TV as an Ames station in the larger Des Moines metro area were factors in the poor ratings. Its benefits to the university were sometimes nebulous. KOMU-TV in Columbia, Missouri—the only comparable station to WOI-TV—was much more extensively tied in with its journalism school as a teaching tool than WOI-TV, where the news staff was independent and station staff controlled the hiring of part-time students.

== Privatization ==
Calls for the sale of WOI-TV from public officials and other broadcasters had been a constant in station history, including in 1955, 1975, 1983, and 1985. However, as conversations about the size of Iowa state government rose to the fore, WOI-TV came up more frequently. Des Moines stockbroker David Hinton, suggesting a Margaret Thatcher–esque privatization push in Iowa, stated, "There are two clear-cut things that, from a philosophical standpoint, no good conservative Republican can have this state be into—and that's WOI-TV and the liquor business" (referring to Iowa's state-run liquor store monopoly). In December 1985, Governor Terry Branstad announced he would ask the legislature to sell WOI-TV as part of sweeping privatization and consolidation efforts in state government. ISU president W. Robert Parks declared that such a sale would be a "huge and irreparable" mistake, representing the irretrievable loss of a university resource. Democratic lawmakers opted to shift the burden for determining WOI-TV's future to the Republican-controlled Iowa Board of Regents. The station was still posting a loss, primarily due to a downturn in advertising revenue and a change in national representation, as well as the accounting of some $1 million in cash and services the station provided to ISU. Leaders defended Iowa State as a well-regarded center for training television journalists. As the controversy continued, Iowa State got a new president: Gordon P. Eaton, who stated it would be his decision whether to sell the station or not.

In February 1986, the Board of Regents approved the creation of an executive committee to make recommendations on WOI-TV and appraise its value. They recommended that ISU continue to own the station but convert it into a separate entity with a strong profit motive, overseen by a separate governing board of directors. If the station could not turn around its finances in a three-year period, it recommended, WOI-TV should be sold. The plan was approved in March 1987. Under the plan, ISU set up the Iowa State University Equities Corporation, a non-profit company held by university administrators. This entity wholly owned the Iowa State University Broadcasting Corporation, whose board of directors included ISU officials, private-sector individuals, and the general manager of WOI. WOI-TV's employees were hired by the new Broadcasting Corporation, splitting them from ISU's comparatively generous benefits.

Following the change, WOI-TV became more aggressive in many areas of programming, promotion, and business operations under new general manager Bob Helmers. Most notable over the period was the shifting of some operations from Ames to Des Moines. In the second half of 1987, the Des Moines office added seven more employees, all in sales and support staff. In August 1989, it rolled out a $250,000 rebrand from "5TV" to "Channel 5" alongside the debut of morning and midday newscasts, a new set, and the hiring of six new full-time news staff. The news assignment desk moved from Ames to Des Moines, even though the newscasts were still presented from Ames.

It established a satellite division which provided satellite uplink services for news and business clients, as well as the Cyclone Television Network, the official broadcaster of Iowa State Cyclones athletics and regional distributor of the fishing show Outdoor Sportsman. In 1988, the Board of Regents received a report stating that WOI-TV was ahead of schedule in operating on an aggressive commercial basis. In spite of the improved news product and increased cash flow, the station fell short of its goal to provide $1 million in cash a year to ISU, generating $400,000 in budget year 1988 and $500,000 in budget year 1989.

=== Sale process ===
In July 1991, Governor Branstad convened a 22-member committee to analyze further budget-trimming measures. Though he ruled out action on WOI-TV, speculation began to bubble about a new sale attempt. In spite of a down market for television station valuations—said to be at lows not seen since the early 1980s—the idea of investing sale proceeds in new technology was floated, and ISU had a new president, Martin C. Jischke. By this time, a sale of WOI-TV had come to rank among the "sacred cows of Statehouse politics" in Iowa.

Jischke asked the Iowa Board of Regents on September 16, 1991, for permission to begin talking with brokers who would take bids for WOI-TV. He declared, "I believe the ownership of a commercial television station is not essential to the mission of our university." A consultant's report found that another $2 million in investment to move the station from Ames to Des Moines was required to make the station more competitive. The board unanimously allowed ISU to seek buyers on September 26. Unlike in 1955, when the Iowa Broadcasters Association called for WOI-TV to be sold, this time the broadcasters opposed the sale, noting that WOI had prepared broadcasters for careers in Iowa.

In February 1992, the Iowa Television Group—a partnership of Des Moines lawyer David W. Belin and Gary Gerlach, publisher of the Ames Daily Tribune and former publisher of The Des Moines Register—was announced as the winning bidder of seven proposals for $12.5 million. One of their business associates, Michael Gartner, refused to join the group because he was the president of NBC News and WOI-TV was an ABC affiliate. From the announcement, the deal was controversial. Belin had as a client Marvin Pomerantz, the president of the Board of Regents.

Days after the sale was announced, regents changed their mind, unsure of the financial viability of the Iowa Television Group deal. Consultants found that the broker hired for ISU might have compromised the process by suggesting the station could go for less than $13.6 million and that the university should have simultaneously negotiated with the two highest bidders. Iowa Television Group complained that a second bidder, Citadel Communications, had improved its offer after an agreed deadline. Neil E. Harl, a professor of agriculture and economics at ISU, objected that the deal was not in the public interest, calling it "risky", dangerous to ISU academic and extension programs such as the journalism program and university's satellite uplink, and overly favorable to the buyers.

In March, the Board of Regents reopened negotiations with the top six bidders, led by Iowa Television Group and Citadel. Iowa Television Group did not participate in the second round of bidding, and Citadel presented what was reported as the high offer of $14 million in April. Other offers were received from Benedek Broadcasting, Federal Broadcasting, and River City Broadcasting, as well as a $200 offer from ISU's student-run cable station. The offer was set to be discussed by the regents at their May meeting. On May 11, Jischke said the station should not be sold, this time because the bids from Benedek and Citadel were financed by junk bonds that he believed put ISU at risk. Citadel increased its bid to $14 million, all cash, and let ISU keep $1.3 million in accounts receivable.

Over Jischke's new recommendation, the regents voted 6–3 to approve the new Citadel offer on May 20, 1992, a decision that stunned station supporters in Ames. Days of whiplash followed. The Iowa Legislature, amid a special session on the budget, swiftly moved to block the sale. The House voted 53–33 and the Senate 33–41 to block the sale, but Governor Branstad objected to the legislation, which he believed interfered with the business of the Iowa Board of Regents, and vetoed it on June 3.

As regents approved the purchase agreement with Citadel subsidiary Capital Communications Company, Harl led a group, Iowans for WOI-TV, which challenged the sale in court. A Boone County district judge heard testimony that the sale was already causing "irreparable harm" to ISU's broadcast journalism program, with some students believing the station sale was already final, and to WOI-TV, where employee resignations were ticking up. ISU argued that any action to block the sale might cause Citadel to back out altogether. The regents approved the contract in late September, but a month later, the judge overruled the sale. Ronald Schechtman found that the regents were careless in following their own rules and treated the transaction "like Captain Ahab's whale".

The Iowa Board of Regents moved to appeal the district judge's ruling. On November 24, 1993, the Iowa Supreme Court unanimously ruled in favor of the transaction. In his ruling for the court, justice James H. Carter called the sale "the type of long-term educational planning decision that the board was empowered to make". The news stunned staff, who also were relieved to have some certainty over the station's future. The board approved a post-closing agreement with Citadel in February 1994, and though there was a last-ditch loophole in the deal allowing the Iowa Legislature one last shot at blocking it, it failed to muster enough votes.

== Citadel era ==
Citadel took control of WOI-TV on February 28, 1994. It did not assume the employment contracts of the station's workers with ISU; it opted not to rehire 20 employees. Among them was Betty Lou Varnum; The Magic Window was canceled, ending its run after nearly 43 years on the air. Another casualty of the purchase was the "CityCast" segment seen by Ames-area cable viewers during the 10 p.m. newscast. Citadel's dramatic first-day action was expected by some, especially those who had lived through the company's 1985 acquisition of KCAU-TV, in which 22 employees were fired immediately, and knew Citadel as a lean operator there and at WHBF-TV in Rock Island, Illinois. Final legal action over the transfer stretched into 1995, as Iowans for WOI-TV challenged the overlap of WOI-TV and KCAU-TV, but one last appeals court decision that February put an end to the battle.

With the station in private ownership for the first time in its 44-year history, Citadel faced the challenge of revitalizing a station that had been a consistent doormat in central Iowa TV news. WOI had never had more than a 15-percent share of the audience for local news and sat at 7 percent in the May 1994 Nielsen sweeps; in comparison, KCCI and WHO-TV were vying for the lead with shares of 40 and 38 percent. Viewers saw WOI-TV as an Ames-focused station and a workshop for university students, both of which hurt its image. Its coverage of the Great Flood of 1993 was particularly panned in hindsight as poor, even though WOI's Ames location should have meant at the time that flooding impacted the station less than its rivals. Citadel worked quickly to fix these issues. In June 1994, it leased a facility in Des Moines at 300 E. Locust Street, which was far larger than its previous office and offered room for a studio in addition to many of WOI's business offices. In November, the news department was split: the evening newscasts moved to Des Moines, but morning and midday newscasts as well as weather forecasts continued to originate from Ames, where WOI-TV had a four-year lease on the Communications Building but began relinquishing space. (Note: The space was then occupied by university departments such as University Relations.) The station hoped to make the continued connection with Ames a competitive advantage to distinguish it from its competitors. WOI provided a natural fit for Citadel's other stations serving parts of Iowa—KCAU-TV and WHBF-TV in the two-state Quad Cities market—which, along with the independently owned KCRG-TV in Cedar Rapids, formed a statewide news network.

The Locust facility was not large enough to move master control from Ames to Des Moines, and Citadel could not find a site in the city that met its needs. In 1997, WOI-TV selected a former US West office in West Des Moines, with nearly 23,000 square feet (2,100 m^{2}) of space. The new facilities offered two studios instead of one and removed technological complexity from the operation, but the station's news ratings continued to be a very distant third behind KCCI and WHO, whose news shares were among the highest in the nation. The newscasts relied on one-person photojournalist-reporters and straightforward presentation. On-air personalities received lower salaries than at KCCI or WHO. Mark Baden, a former meteorologist, noted that the station lacked the sort of community and advertising presence that its competitors had cultivated. Among the bright spots was the station's high school sports coverage, considered the most comprehensive in the market.

It took years for WOI-TV to shed past perceptions. In 2002, operations director Randy Shelton opined that a call sign change in 1994 might have helped people think the station was no longer connected to the university. Al Sandubrae, who oversaw news across the four-station Citadel portfolio, admitted that in spite of changes and improvements in the area of news, "[W]e are swimming upstream against the tide of history." That October, WOI began broadcasting a digital signal, WOI-DT on channel 59. Though the introduction of a second early evening newscast at 6 p.m. was contemplated as early as 2002, it did not take place until 2005. It was the first time the station had aired news at 6 since 1997 and the first time it had 5 and 6 p.m. broadcasts at the same time. Citadel made another major relaunch attempt in 2006: the station rebranded as "ABC 5".

WOI-TV shut down its analog signal, over VHF channel 5, on June 12, 2009, the official date on which full-power television stations in the United States transitioned from analog to digital broadcasts under federal mandate. The station's digital signal relocated from its pre-transition UHF channel 59, which was among the high band UHF channels (52-69) that were removed from broadcasting use as a result of the transition, to its analog-era VHF channel 5.

== After Citadel ==
=== Nexstar ownership ===
On September 16, 2013, Citadel announced that it would sell WOI-DT, along with KCAU-TV and WHBF-TV, to Nexstar Broadcasting Group for $88 million. Nexstar immediately took over the stations' operations through a time brokerage agreement. The deal followed Citadel founder and CEO Phil Lombardo's decision to "slow down" as well as a desire by Lynch Entertainment to divest its investments in WOI and WHBF. The sale was completed on March 13, 2014. Nexstar soon grew its holdings in Des Moines by announcing the purchase of CW affiliate KCWI from the liquidating trust of Pappas Telecasting for $3.5 million, a deal announced that November and finalized in March 2016.

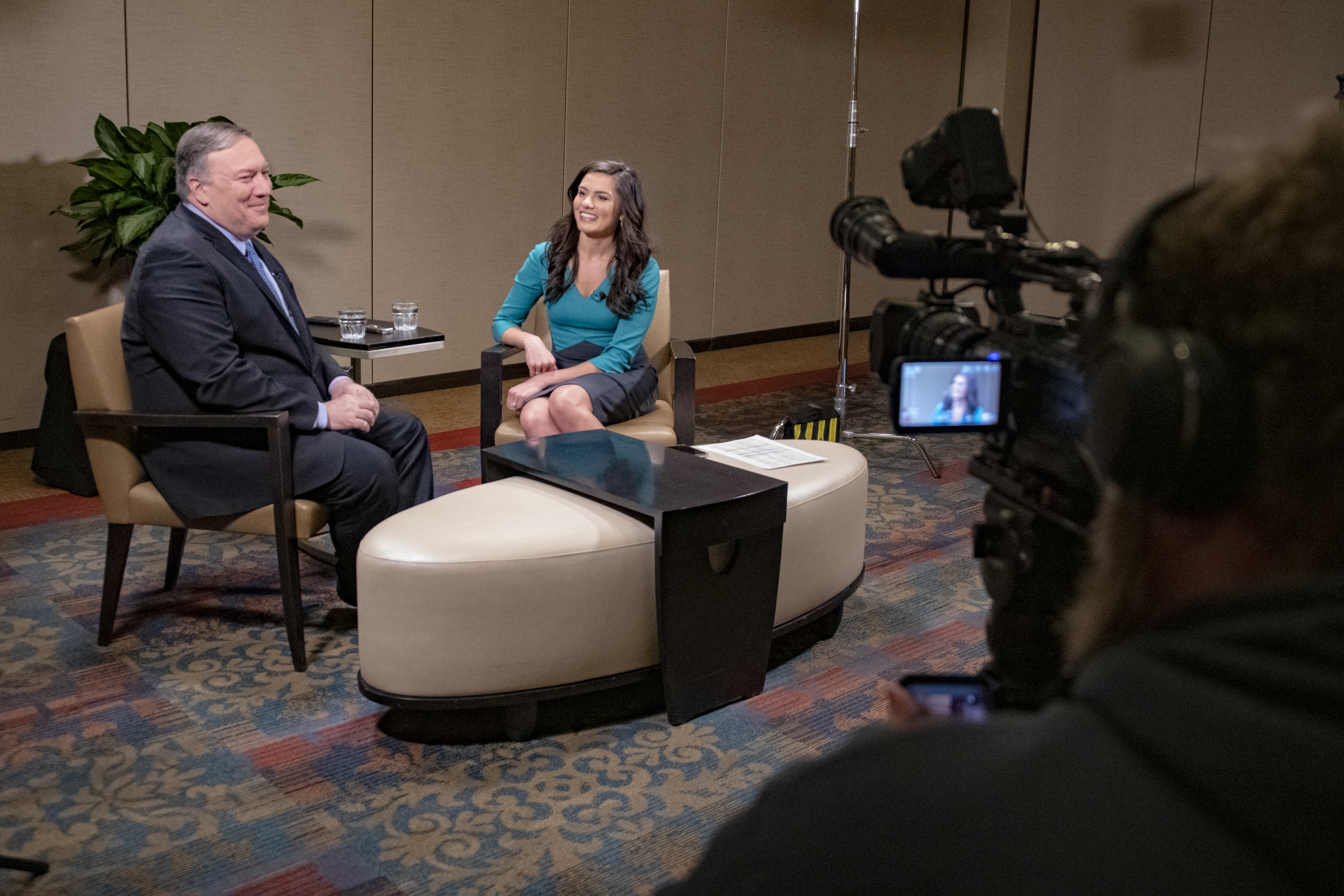
Secretary of State Mike Pompeo is interviewed by WOI's Sabrina Ahmed in March 2019.

WOI re-launched on January 5, 2015, as Local 5 with newscasts titled Local 5 News and a revamped morning newscast, Good Morning Iowa. The rebrand accompanied renewed investment by Nexstar, which added eight newsroom positions to the budget and updated WOI's set and equipment.

=== Sale to Tegna Inc. ===
Nexstar agreed to acquire Tribune Media—owner of WHO-DT—for $6.4 billion in cash and debt. Nexstar could not keep both of WOI and WHO; it opted to retain WHO and sold WOI and KCWI to Tegna Inc. as part of an 11-station, $740-million divestiture package.

=== Second Nexstar ownership ===
Nexstar acquired Tegna in a deal announced in August 2025 and completed on March 19, 2026. The deal included approval via the FCC's Media Bureau for Nexstar to own three station licenses in markets such as Des Moines. The year before, a federal appeals court had struck down a rule barring ownership of two top-four station licenses. A temporary restraining order issued by the U.S. District Court for the Eastern District of California on March 28, 2026, later escalated to a preliminary injunction on April 17, has prevented Nexstar from integrating the stations.

== Notable former on-air staff ==
- Steve Bell – anchor, 1959–1961
- Vince DeMentri – anchor, 1989
- Chris Flanagan – anchor, 2004–2009
- Curt Menefee – sports anchor, 1987–1988
- Tom Pettit

== Technical information ==
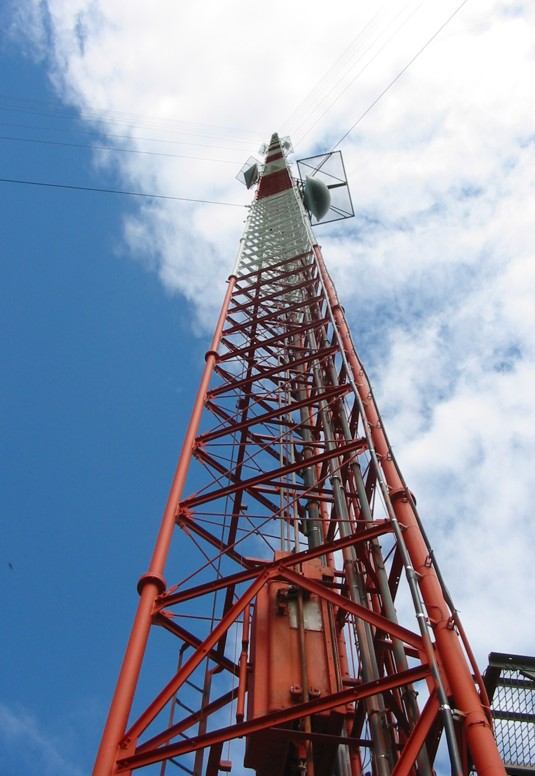
The tower used by WOI-TV in Alleman, Iowa

=== Subchannels ===
WOI-DT broadcasts from a transmitter in Alleman. Its signal is multiplexed:

Subchannels of WOI-DT
Subchannel	Res.	Short name	Programming
5.1	720p	WOI-HD	ABC
5.2	480i	Crime	True Crime Network
5.3	480i	Grit	Grit
5.4	480i	NEST	The Nest
5.6	480i	CONFESS	Rewind TV
5.7	480i	OPEN	365BLK
5.8	480i	OPEN	Outlaw
5.9	480i	OPEN	Defy

There is no subchannel 5.5 from the WOI-DT transmitter. Since February 2020, it is broadcast from KCWI-TV as a simulcast of 5.1 to aid viewers with trouble tuning in the low-VHF signal.

== See also ==
- List of three-letter broadcast call signs in the United States
