= KCCI =

Television station in Des Moines, Iowa

- Des Moines, Iowa; United States
- Channels: Digital: 8 (VHF); Virtual: 8
- Branding: KCCI 8; KCCI 8 News; MeTV Des Moines (8.2); My Des Moines (8.3)

Programming
- Affiliations: 8.1: CBS; for others, see § Subchannels

Ownership
- Owner: Hearst Television; (Hearst Properties Inc.)

History
- First air date: July 31, 1955
- Former call signs: KRNT-TV (1955–1974)
- Former channel numbers: Analog: 8 (VHF, 1955–2009); Digital: 31 (UHF, 2002–2009)
- Call sign meaning: Cowles Communications, Inc. (founding owners)

Technical information
- Licensing authority: FCC
- Facility ID: 33710
- ERP: 44.6 kW
- HAAT: 596.5 m (1,957 ft)
- Transmitter coordinates: 41°48′35″N 93°37′17″W

Links
- Public license information: Public file; LMS
- Website: www.kcci.com

KCCI (channel 8) is a television station in Des Moines, Iowa, United States, affiliated with CBS. Owned by Hearst Television, the station maintains studios on Ninth Street in downtown Des Moines and a transmitter in Alleman.

== History ==
KCCI started on the air on July 31, 1955, as KRNT-TV, the third television station in Des Moines and the ninth in Iowa. It was owned by the Cowles family, publishers of the still-operating Des Moines Register and the defunct Des Moines Tribune newspapers, along with KRNT radio (AM 1350 and the original KRNT-FM at 104.5, which went dark). The calls stood for the papers' nickname in central Iowa, "the R 'n T".

The Cowles family and rival KSO radio (now KXNO, also owned by the Cowles interests until 1942) both applied for the channel 8 construction permit. A decision was held up due to issues with the Cowles' ownership of Look magazine. Eventually, the two stations reached a settlement that allowed KRNT to own 60 percent of the TV station and KSO to own 40 percent. Once the Federal Communications Commission (FCC) approved the station's license, KRNT immediately bought out KSO's share of the station. KRNT-TV's broadcasting day was originally about five to six hours long, and included a 15-minute news program later in the evening. The station has been part of the CBS television network through its entire history, owing to KRNT radio's long affiliation with the CBS Radio Network.

The FCC tightened its ownership rules in the 1970s, forcing the Cowles interests to sell one of their Des Moines broadcast outlets. They opted to sell KRNT radio and KRNQ-FM (KSTZ, originally the second KRNT-FM) to Stauffer Communications in 1974 and retain both newspapers and KRNT-TV, with the callsign changing to KCCI-TV on February 25; the new calls standing for owner Cowles Communications, Inc. (FCC rules at the time had a restriction on call letters being used by TV and radio stations in the same market, but with different ownership, which led to the TV station changing its callsign.)

Over the years, Cowles Communications bought several other media outlets, including KTVH (now KWCH-DT) in Hutchinson, Kansas (and its satellites in the western part of Kansas), WESH-TV in Daytona Beach, Florida, and WQAD-TV in the Quad Cities area.

In 1983, the Cowles family announced it was breaking up its vast media empire, selling off most of its assets except the Minneapolis Star Tribune. While the Register went to the Gannett Company and the Register and Tribune Syndicate (best known as syndicators of The Family Circus) went to the Hearst Corporation's King Features Syndicate division, KCCI and WESH went to H&C Communications. Cowles earned a handsome return on its purchase of KRNT radio's predecessor, the original KSO, in 1932; the call letters became KRNT in 1935.

After initially planning on selling its entire television station group to Young Broadcasting in 1992, H&C sold KCCI and WESH to Pulitzer in 1993. Hearst-Argyle Television bought all of Pulitzer's television holdings in 1998.

KCCI began broadcasting in high-definition television on channel 8.1 in 2002. On July 24, 2006, KCCI launched "Weather Now", a 24-hour local weather channel that appeared on digital subchannel 8.2 as well as local Mediacom digital cable channel 247, and the station's website until June 30, 2011. On July 1, 2011, KCCI replaced the weather channel with MeTV on subchannel 8.2.

The station operates a website at www.kcci.com. For several years the station's website was known as www.theiowachannel.com, following the practice of other Hearst-Argyle stations, and people going to kcci.com were redirected to theiowachannel.com. In October 2005, the station switched back to the kcci.com name for its web site, with theiowachannel.com serving as a redirect to kcci.com.

On December 10, 2008, KCCI president and general manager Paul Fredericksen announced a staffing reorganization which eliminated six positions, including on-air talent.

== Weather beacon ==
A 200-foot (61 m) weather beacon was once affixed to the auxiliary tower atop the station's downtown Des Moines studios and was a landmark of the Des Moines skyline. The lighted beacon changed colors depending on the forecast:

Weather Beacon red, warmer weather ahead.
Weather Beacon white, colder weather in sight.
Weather Beacon green, no change in forecast foreseen.
Weather Beacon flashing night or day, precipitation is on the way.

The beacon was active until the 1970s energy crisis, then powered back up by the station in 1987. An ice storm in January 2010 damaged the weather beacon, but it was repaired later that year.

The weather beacon was permanently shut down on the morning of Thursday, September 27, 2012.

== News operation ==
KCCI broadcasts 34 1/2 hours of locally produced newscasts each week (with 5 1/2 hours each weekday, three hours on Saturdays and four hours on Sundays).

Although it was the last Big Three station to sign on in the area, channel 8 has been the highest-rated station in Des Moines for most of its history, mainly due to its roots in the Register. It often garnered more viewers than WHO-TV and WOI-TV combined. However, in the February 2010 sweeps period, KCCI fell to second behind WHO in the mornings and at 6 p.m. The latter was significant, as it was the first time KCCI had lost the lead in that timeslot in memory. In the May 2011 sweeps, KCCI lost the lead at 5 p.m. as well, but still held a narrow lead at 10 p.m. After tight ratings races in 2011 and 2012, in July 2013, KCCI won every time slot, among all audiences as well as the 25- to 54-year-old age group. KCCI also widened its lead over WHO in many slots, including midday and evenings, compared with the year prior.

On April 20, 2009, KCCI became the first station in Des Moines to broadcast local news in 16:9 widescreen. Even as the other major stations made the upgrade to high-definition local newscasts in the two years following KCCI's upgrade to widescreen, KCCI's newscasts remained in enhanced definition widescreen until April 26, 2011, when it became the last major station in Des Moines to upgrade its local newscasts to high definition beginning with the 5 p.m. newscast.

In 2009, KCCI won National Edward R. Murrow Awards for Best Newscast and Overall Excellence. In 2010, KCCI won Regional Edward R. Murrow Awards for Best Newscast and Overall Excellence. In 2009 and 2011, KCCI won the Photography Station of the Year award in the small market division from the National Press Photographers Association (NPPA). The NPPA also named Photojournalist Cortney Kintzer as the Photographer of the Year in Region 5 (Iowa, Minnesota, Wisconsin and Illinois).

KCCI added a 9 p.m. newscast to its MeTV subchannel on March 21, 2016, to compete with the WHO-produced news airing on KDSM-TV. In some instances, such as live CBS Sports coverage on weekends, other newscasts will move to MeTV.

In 1990, when sports director Pete Taylor left to work at Iowa State University, KCCI reporter Heidi Soliday became the first female local sports director in the United States.

On July 15, 2024, KCCI added an hour long 4 p.m. newscast, moving The Kelly Clarkson Show to 3 p.m. and The Jennifer Hudson Show to 12:37 a.m.

=== Other former on-air staff ===
- David Horowitz
- Dolph Pulliam
- Bill Riley Sr.
- Russ Van Dyke

== Technical information ==
=== Subchannels ===
The station's signal is multiplexed:

Subchannels of KCCI
Subchannel	Res.	Short name	Programming
8.1	1080i	KCCI-HD	CBS
8.2	480i	KCCI-SD	MeTV
8.3	480i	KCCI-MY	H&I / MyNetworkTV
8.4	480i	STORY	Story Television
17.4	480i	ROAR	Roar (KDSM-TV)

Broadcast on behalf of another station

=== Analog-to-digital conversion ===
KCCI shut down its analog signal, over VHF channel 8, on June 12, 2009, the official date on which full-power television stations in the United States transitioned from analog to digital broadcasts under federal mandate. The station's digital signal relocated from its pre-transition UHF channel 31 to its analog-era VHF channel 8.

Some viewers have had trouble receiving KCCI's channel 8 VHF digital signal, so KCCI has applied for authority to construct a fill-in translator station on its pre-transition channel 31. But on June 12, 2013, the station canceled the permit.
