= WHO-DT =

Television station in Des Moines, Iowa

- Des Moines, Iowa; United States
- Channels: Digital: 13 (VHF); Virtual: 13
- Branding: WHO 13 (call letters are pronounced individually)

Programming
- Affiliations: 13.1: NBC; for others, see § Subchannels

Ownership
- Owner: Nexstar Media Group; (Tribune Broadcasting Company II LLC)
- Sister stations: Tegna: WOI-DT, KCWI-TV

History
- First air date: April 25, 1954
- Former call signs: WHO-TV (1954–2009)
- Former channel numbers: Analog: 13 (VHF, 1954–2009); Digital: 19 (UHF, 2001–2009); Translators: K27CV Ottumwa; K66AL Clarinda
- Former affiliations: UPN (secondary, 2003–2006); Fox (DT3, temporary host of KDSM-TV, 2019)
- Call sign meaning: originally assigned to former sister station, WHO radio

Technical information
- Licensing authority: FCC
- Facility ID: 66221
- ERP: 36.5 kW
- HAAT: 600 m (1,969 ft)
- Transmitter coordinates: 41°48′33″N 93°36′54″W

Links
- Public license information: Public file; LMS
- Website: who13.com

WHO-DT (channel 13) is a television station in Des Moines, Iowa, United States, affiliated with NBC. It is owned by Nexstar Media Group, whose Tegna subsidiary owns ABC affiliate WOI-DT (channel 5) and CW station KCWI-TV (channel 23). WHO-DT's studios are located on Grand Avenue in downtown Des Moines, and its transmitter is located in Alleman, Iowa.

== History ==
WHO-TV signed on the air on April 25, 1954, as the third television station in Des Moines, after WOI-TV (channel 5) and KGTV (channel 17). It was signed on by the Tri-City Broadcasting Company, which was owned by the Palmer family, owners of WHO radio (AM 1040 and FM 100.3, now KDRB). The Palmers had competed with KIOA for the channel 13 license and won it after reaching a settlement. It has always been an NBC affiliate, having inherited this affiliation from WOI-TV and owing to WHO's long affiliation with the NBC Radio Network.

Palmer Communications, which since the 1970s had been the name of the Palmer family's holding company, sold off their broadcast holdings in 1996, with WHO-TV and sister station KFOR-TV in Oklahoma City going to The New York Times Company. Up to that time, channel 13 had been the last locally owned commercial station in Des Moines. WHO radio, which was eventually acquired by Jacor Communications (which later merged with Clear Channel Communications), continued to occupy the same building until it moved to another building in 2005. While WHO-TV was co-owned with WHO radio, it used an owl as its mascot.

On January 4, 2007, The New York Times entered into an agreement to sell its entire television division, including WHO-TV, to private equity group Oak Hill Capital Partners. Oak Hill created Local TV LLC as a holding company for the former New York Times stations. The sale closed on May 7, 2007.

On December 20, 2007, Local TV and Tribune Company entered into a letter of intent to create a third-party broadcast management company to provide shared services to all of Local TV and Tribune's stations. The company functioned as a wholly owned subsidiary of Tribune Company, and provided back-office services, administration, and a number of other functions to the stations. The most noticeable byproducts of this partnership were the redesigned websites of WHO-TV and Local TV's other stations, which were launched during late January and into February 2009, using the Tribune Interactive platform also used by the websites of Tribune-owned stations. However, on March 7, 2012, following the lead of Local TV's Fox-affiliated stations, WHO-DT became the first of Local TV's "Big Three" network-affiliated stations to migrate its website away from Tribune Digital (successor to Tribune Interactive) to a new host, WordPress.com VIP.

On July 1, 2013, Local TV announced that it would be acquired outright by Tribune Broadcasting, making WHO-DT and KFOR Tribune's first NBC affiliates. The sale was completed on December 27.

=== Aborted sale to Sinclair; sale to Nexstar ===
Sinclair Broadcast Group, which has owned KDSM-TV since 1996, entered into an agreement to acquire Tribune Media on May 8, 2017, for $3.9 billion, plus the assumption of $2.7 billion in Tribune debt. The deal received significant scrutiny over Sinclair's forthrightness in its applications to sell certain conflict properties, prompting the FCC to designate it for hearing and leading Tribune to terminate the deal and sue Sinclair for breach of contract.

Following the Sinclair deal's collapse, Nexstar Media Group of Irving, Texas, announced its purchase of Tribune Media on December 3, 2018, for $6.4 billion in cash and debt. As Nexstar already owned ABC affiliate WOI-DT and CW affiliate KCWI-TV (channel 23), the company agreed on March 20, 2019, to divest the WOI/KCWI duopoly to Tegna Inc. as part of a $1.32 billion group deal with Tegna and the E. W. Scripps Company. The sale was completed on September 19, 2019.

In August 2025, Nexstar agreed to acquire Tegna for $6.2 billion. The deal was completed on March 19, 2026, and included approval for Nexstar to own three full-power station licenses in markets such as Des Moines. A temporary restraining order issued one week later by the U.S. District Court for the Eastern District of California, later escalated to a preliminary injunction, has prevented Nexstar from integrating the stations.

== Programming ==
=== Past programming preemptions and deferrals ===
Until the 1980s, WHO-TV frequently preempted NBC programming in favor of local shows. For instance, it only ran Days of Our Lives for 37 of its 57 years on NBC, beginning with the soap opera's 20th season and ending with its move to the streaming service Peacock in September 2022; in the 1960s and 1970s, the station aired a 90-minute movie between 12:30 and 2 p.m. For its first 23 years on the air, WHO-TV had a competing station in KQTV/KVFD-TV in Fort Dodge.

=== News operation ===
WHO-TV presently broadcasts 36 hours of locally produced newscasts each week (with six hours each weekday and three hours each on Saturdays and Sundays); in regards to the numbers of hours devoted to programming, it is the largest local newscast output among any station in Des Moines and the state of Iowa.

It was in 1976 that WHO-TV formed its most popular news team: Jack Cafferty, Phil Thomas, Jerry Reno and Jim Zabel all were hired for the Des Moines variation of the Eyewitness News format. By 1977, Cafferty had become one of the nation's most sought after local TV anchors, even being represented by the William Morris Agency. Cafferty left WHO that year to join NBC's flagship station WNBC-TV in New York City and was with CNN until 2012. Knowing of his departure, WHO-TV ran a transitional ad where he was photographed next to Phil Thomas, who was in the foreground. Following Cafferty's departure, his place was taken by Greg Burden, a former college basketball player from Los Angeles who was hired away from KMOX-TV (now KMOV) in St. Louis. Although his personality clicked with fellow newscasters, Thomas complained that the fact that Burden was bigger than him had made him look like a circus midget. Later in the decade the humor on Eyewitness News, combined with the two anchors' constant ribbing, was a source of annoyance for the Palmers, particularly when audience research showed that viewers compared Phil Thomas to the then-budding comedian Steve Martin and bloopers from the news were on the inaugural show of NBC's Real People. (Said bloopers aired as part of the show locally on WHO-TV and have been uploaded to YouTube.)

By 1979, Phil Thomas had risen to become the news director at the station, as reported in the Guthrie Center Times, where he began his news career.

On September 2, 2008, WHO-TV entered into a news share agreement with Fox affiliate KDSM-TV (owned by the Sinclair Broadcast Group). The big three station then began producing a Des Moines-based prime time newscast known as Channel 13 News at Nine on Fox 17. KDSM previously had its 9 p.m. broadcast produced by Sinclair sister outlet KGAN in Cedar Rapids. Originating from WHO-TV's primary set at its facilities on Grand Avenue in Downtown Des Moines (with separate duratrans indicating the Fox show), the nightly prime time program currently airs for an hour on weeknights and thirty minutes on weekends. KDSM features the majority of WHO-TV's on-air team but maintains a separate news anchor on weeknights. Unlike other outsourced news arrangements at Sinclair-owned television stations, KDSM uses the same music and graphics package scheme as seen on this NBC affiliate. WHO had also produced a prime time newscast for Pax TV (now Ion Television) owned-and-operated station KFPX-TV in 2001, and later reran its 10 p.m. news on that station.

For the better part of its history, WHO-TV was a solid, if usually distant, runner-up to CBS affiliate KCCI in the ratings. It managed to close the gap somewhat at the turn of the century. In February 2010, WHO-TV overtook KCCI in the mornings and at 6 p.m. The latter was significant, as it was the first time that channel 8 had lost the lead at 6 in decades.

In the May 2011 ratings period, WHO-TV surged ahead as central Iowa's news leader, claiming a ratings victory in the majority of weekday newscasts (morning, 5 p.m. and 6 p.m.) KCCI retained a narrow lead at 10 p.m. WHO-TV held the lead in most timeslots until February 2013, when KCCI beat WHO-TV by a decisive margin in every timeslot.

WHO-TV has many firsts in the market. It was the first area station to use videotape and the first to broadcast from news events live. It was also the first station to use live Doppler radar and the first to broadcast in high definition (during the 2002 Winter Olympics) and air local news segments in high definition. On April 22, 2009, channel 13 became the second station in Des Moines broadcasting all in-studio news in widescreen standard definition. On May 19, 2010, WHO-HD became the first commercial station in Des Moines to launch fully into high definition television.

On September 8, 2014, the station premiered a 4 p.m. newscast with Ellen's move to KCCI. The station decided not to fill the timeslot with syndicated programming as all the ad revenue in the hour goes to the station, especially during popular political advertising seasons.

==== Notable current on-air staff ====
- Justin Surrency – reporter

==== Notable former on-air staff ====
- Jack Cafferty
- Jim Zabel (also personality at WHO Radio and play-by-play announcer for the Iowa Hawkeyes radio network)

== Technical information ==
=== Subchannels ===
The station's signal is multiplexed:

Subchannels of WHO-DT
Subchannel	Res.	Short name	Programming
13.1	1080i	WHO-HD	NBC
13.2	480i	WHO-DT	Cozi TV
13.3	480i	WHO-DT	Antenna TV
13.4	480i	WHO-DT4	Iowa's Weather Channel
17.1	720p	FOX	Fox (KDSM-TV)

Broadcast on behalf of another station

In 2008, WHO-TV introduced Iowa's Weather Plus, a 24-hour weather channel affiliated with NBC Weather Plus. This station airs on digital channel 13.2 and Mediacom digital channel 246. Although the national feed of NBC's Weather Plus has been discontinued, the format continues with the new branding of "Iowa's Weather Channel". Besides the rolling weather coverage, it airs a repeat of WHO-DT's midday newscast at 2 p.m., as well as a children's E/I programming block on Saturdays from 7 to 10 a.m. On August 22, 2016, WHO-DT began broadcasting This TV on digital subchannel 13.4. In October 2019, subchannel 13.4 flipped to Court TV. In May 2023, "Iowa's Weather Channel" returned, but this time on 13.4, effectively dropping Court TV from its subchannel lineup. In May 2026, Cozi TV replaced Rewind TV.

=== Analog-to-digital conversion ===
WHO-TV launched digital television programming on channel 19 as WHO-DT on January 10, 2001. The station shut down its analog signal, over VHF channel 13, on February 17, 2009, the original target date on which full-power television stations in the United States were to transition from analog to digital broadcasts under federal mandate (which was later pushed back to June 12, 2009). The station's digital signal relocated from its pre-transition UHF channel 19 to VHF channel 13.

With the conversion to digital, the station also retired the longtime WHO-TV call sign in favor of WHO-DT, a move opposite to what most other TV stations across the country have done (competitor WOI retained its "-DT" suffix as well). In the spring of 2011, the station unofficially changed its call letters to "WHO-HD".

=== Former translators ===
WHO-DT was previously repeated on analog translators K27CV (channel 27) in Ottumwa and K66AL (channel 66) in Clarinda. The Ottumwa translator was operated by a local non-profit organization, while the Clarinda translator was owned by the City of Clarinda.

== See also ==
- The Floppy Show, a long-running children's television series on WHO-TV
- List of three-letter broadcast call signs in the United States
