= Iowa PBS =

PBS member network in Iowa

- Type: Non-commercial educational broadcast television network
- Country: United States
- Availability: statewide Iowa
- TV transmitters: 9
- Headquarters: 6450 Corporate Drive, Johnston, Iowa
- Owner: Iowa Public Broadcasting Board
- Launch date: April 27, 1959 (KDIN-TV); 1969 (statewide network launch)
- Picture format: 480i (SDTV) (1959–2009); 1080i (HDTV) (2009–present)
- Affiliation: PBS
- Affiliates: See § Stations and § Translators
- Former affiliations: NET (1959–1970)
- Official website: www.iowapbs.org

Iowa PBS, formerly Iowa Public Television (IPTV), is a network of Public Broadcasting Service (PBS) member stations in the U.S. state of Iowa. It is operated by the Iowa Public Broadcasting Board, an agency of the state education department which holds the licenses for all the PBS member stations in the state. Iowa PBS' headquarters are located at 6450 Corporate Drive in Johnston, Iowa, a suburb of Des Moines.

== History ==
Logo as "Iowa Public Television" used until 2019

Iowa is a pioneer in educational broadcasting; it is home to two of the oldest educational radio broadcast stations in the world, the University of Iowa's WSUI and Iowa State University's WOI.

The electrical engineering department at the State University of Iowa (SUI) in Iowa City demonstrated television with an exhibit at the Iowa State Fair in Des Moines on August 28, 1931. J. L. Potter supervised the project. At the conclusion of the Iowa State Fair, the television experiment was set up in the communications laboratory of the electrical engineering building at the University of Iowa in Iowa City.

By 1933, the University of Iowa received an FCC license for experimental TV station W9XK, later W9XUI, providing twice a week video programming, with WSUI radio providing the audio channel. By 1939, the FCC allocated TV channels 1 and 12 for W9XUI. This early attempt at educational broadcasting ended by December 1941, with the entrance of the United States into World War II.

The University of Iowa later applied for a construction permit for station WSUI-TV on channel 11 in February 1948.

The Federal Communications Commission (FCC) froze the granting of new television licenses, on September 30, 1948. The FCC, at the time, was swamped with hundreds of requests for licensing. It was creating a problem for allocation and causing interference issues. The FCC wanted time to study the issues and work towards a better overall solution.

The freeze, originally set to last just six months, was extended when the Korean War began. Plus, the issues the FCC was trying to resolve were complicated and many. It ended up taking four years to end the freeze.

The April 14, 1952, FCC "6th Report and Order" effectively lifted the freeze. The decisions had been made on all five dilemmas. In the end, a color standard was chosen, 242 channels were designated for educational non-commercial use, strict rules separated stations sharing channels, channel allocation was resolved with an assignment table, and the entire spectrum of UHF band channels was authorized for use.

In 1951, the university supported the reallocation of channel 11 to Des Moines for an educational television station there.

Meanwhile, Iowa State University's WOI-TV in Ames avoided the 1948 Freeze and began commercial broadcast operations in 1950 and carried some National Educational Television programming. Des Moines Public Schools applied for the channel 11 allocation and signed on KDPS-TV as the educational station for central Iowa in 1959. However, in the 1960s the only other areas of the state with a clear signal from an educational station were the southwest (from Nebraska ETV's KYNE-TV in Omaha), and the northwest (from South Dakota ETV's KUSD-TV in Vermillion).

In 1969, the state of Iowa bought KDPS-TV from the Des Moines Public Schools and changed its calls to KDIN-TV, intending it to be the linchpin of a statewide educational television network. As part of the state's ambition, it rebranded KDIN as the Iowa Educational Broadcasting Network.

The network's second station, KIIN-TV in Iowa City, joined IEBN in 1970 to expand statewide educational programming to eastern Iowa and northwestern Illinois. Soon afterward, IEBN became a charter member of PBS. By 1977 the newly renamed Iowa Public Broadcasting Network had eight full-power stations. The Iowa Public Television name was adopted in 1982 and began on-air January 1, 1983. In 2003, it purchased KQCT-TV in Davenport, which repeated the programming of Quad Cities PBS station WQPT-TV in the Iowa side of the Quad Cities. The calls were changed to KQIN.

IPTV was originally run by the state's General Services Department before Governor Terry Branstad signed a bill creating Iowa Public Television as a separate state agency on May 16, 1983. In 1986, IPTV became part of the state's Cultural Affairs Department, and on July 1, 1992, IPTV became part of the Iowa Department of Education.

Combined, the nine Iowa PBS stations reach almost all of Iowa and portions of the surrounding states of Illinois, Minnesota, Missouri, Nebraska, South Dakota, and Wisconsin.

On December 2, 2019, IPTV announced that it would rebrand as Iowa PBS in 2020, in alignment with PBS' new national brand identity.

== Stations ==
Nine full-power TV stations make up the network; all stations have callsigns beginning with the letter K, as licensed by the FCC, and ending in IN (standing for Iowa Network). Aside from their transmitters, the network's stations (except KDIN-TV) do not maintain any physical presence in their cities of license.

Station	City of license (other cities served)	Channels (RF / VC)	First air date	Second letter's meaning	ERP	HAAT	Facility ID	Transmitter coordinates	Former callsigns	Public license information
KBIN-TV	Council Bluffs (Omaha, NE)	33 (UHF); 32	September 7, 1975	Council Bluffs	200 kW	98 m (322 ft)	29108	41°15′15″N 95°50′8″W	KBIN (1975–1980)	Public file LMS
KDIN-TV	Des Moines	11 (VHF); 11	April 27, 1959	Des Moines	22.5 kW	600 m (1,969 ft)	29102	41°48′33″N 93°36′54″W (Alleman)	KDPS-TV (1959–1969)	Public file LMS
KHIN	Red Oak	35 (UHF); 36	September 7, 1975		600 kW	475 m (1,558 ft)	29085	41°20′39″N 95°15′22″W (Hancock)	KJAA (CP, 1974–1975)	Public file LMS
KIIN	Iowa City (Cedar Rapids)	12 (VHF); 12	February 8, 1970	Iowa City	57 kW	439 m (1,440 ft)	29095	41°43′15″N 91°20′30″W (West Branch)	KIIN-TV (1970–1980)	Public file LMS
KQIN	Davenport (Bettendorf/ Moline–Rock Island, IL)	34 (UHF); 36	December 16, 1991	Quad Cities	199.5 kW	233 m (764 ft)	5471	41°18′44.5″N 90°22′46.2″W (Orion, IL)	KQCT (1991–2003)	Public file LMS
KRIN	Waterloo	35 (UHF); 32	December 15, 1974	Waterloo	250 kW	584 m (1,916 ft)	29114	42°18′59″N 91°51′31″W (Rowley)	KRIN-TV (1/24/1980–11/3/1980)	Public file LMS
KSIN-TV	Sioux City	28 (UHF); 27	January 4, 1975	Sioux City	400 kW	348.3 m (1,142.7 ft)	29096	42°30′53″N 96°18′16″W	KSIN (1975–1980)	Public file LMS
KTIN	Fort Dodge	25 (UHF); 21	April 8, 1977		600 kW	355 m (1,165 ft)	29100	42°49′2.7″N 94°24′41.9″W (Bradgate)		Public file LMS
KYIN	Mason City	18 (UHF); 24	May 14, 1977		533 kW	448.5 m (1,471.5 ft)	29086	43°28′32″N 92°42′30″W (Meyer)		Public file LMS

=== Translators ===
- K18GU-D Ottumwa (translating KIIN)
- K19KX-D Keokuk (translating KIIN)
- K24IM-D Keosauqua (translating KIIN)
- K25PE-D Decorah (translating KYIN)
- K26JI-D Sibley (translating KSIN-TV)
- K28JD-D Fort Madison (translating KIIN)
- K31NJ-D Lansing (translating KYIN)
- K33PV-D Rock Rapids (translating KSIN-TV)

In 2012, an application was filed for a digital replacement translator to extend coverage of KRIN into Dubuque. The application was withdrawn in October 2024.

== Technical information ==
=== Subchannels ===
The signals of the Iowa PBS stations are multiplexed:

Subchannels of KDIN-TV
Subchannel	Res.	Short name	Programming
11.1	1080i	IowaPBS	PBS
11.2	720p	PBSKids	PBS Kids
11.3	480i	World	World
11.4	480i	Create	Create
11.99	Audio only	IRIS	IRIS
17.2	480i	Comet	Comet (KDSM-TV)
17.3	480i	Charge!	Charge! (KDSM-TV)

Broadcast on behalf of another station

Subchannels of the other Iowa PBS stations
Subchannel	Res.	Short name	Programming
xx.1	1080i	IowaPBS	PBS
xx.2	720p	PBSKids	PBS Kids
xx.3	480i	World	World
xx.4	480i	Create	Create
xx.99	Audio only	IRIS	IRIS

=== Analog-to-digital conversion ===
Iowa PBS (as IPTV) shut down its stations' analog signals on June 12, 2009, the official date on which full-power television stations in the United States transitioned from analog to digital broadcasts under federal mandate. The station's digital channel allocations post-transition are as follows:

- KBIN-TV shut down its analog signal, over UHF channel 32; the station's digital signal remained on its pre-transition UHF channel 33, using virtual channel 32.
- KDIN-TV shut down its analog signal, over VHF channel 11; the station's digital signal relocated from its pre-transition UHF channel 50 to VHF channel 11.
- KHIN shut down its analog signal, over UHF channel 36; the station's digital signal remained on its pre-transition UHF channel 35, using virtual channel 36.
- KIIN shut down its analog signal, over VHF channel 12; the station's digital signal relocated from its pre-transition UHF channel 45 to VHF channel 12.
- KQIN shut down its analog signal, over UHF channel 36; the station's digital signal remained on its pre-transition UHF channel 34, using virtual channel 36.
- KRIN shut down its analog signal, over UHF channel 32; the station's digital signal remained on its pre-transition UHF channel 35, using virtual channel 32.
- KSIN-TV shut down its analog signal, over UHF channel 27; the station's digital signal remained on its pre-transition UHF channel 28, using virtual channel 27.
- KTIN shut down its analog signal, over UHF channel 21; the station's digital signal remained on its pre-transition UHF channel 25, using virtual channel 21.
- KYIN shut down its analog signal, over UHF channel 24; the station's digital signal remained on its pre-transition UHF channel 18, using virtual channel 24.

=== Late night programming ===
Starting August 31, 2013, Iowa PBS (as IPTV) had gone off-the-air nightly from midnight to 5 a.m. over-the-air due to budget concerns, reduced from a 24-hour schedule. Mediacom continued to carry the network in their markets with 24-hour programming due to their direct fiber connection from IPTV in Johnston to their Des Moines headend, which distributes the four IPTV channels statewide. The national satellite services carry the network's primary HD channel (IPTV.1) and have a fiber connection so the channel was available 24/7 to their subscribers. At the present time, they do not carry the three subchannels.

The network restored over-the-air 24-hour service on January 15, 2019; late night programming mainly consists of the national PBS schedule.

== Programming ==
Although Iowa PBS provides PBS programming and also coordinates several political debates during the Iowa Caucuses, it also produces original programs, such as:

- Crafts from the Past, a crafting show.
- Fair, live show from the Iowa State Fair every year.
- Gardening with Steil, a gardening show hosted by Aaron Steil.
- Greetings from Iowa, a lifestyle show.
- Historic Buildings of Iowa, a historical documentary show.
- In Their Words, featuring the youth of Iowa.
- Iowa Ingredient, a cooking show.
- Iowa Life, a human interest, magazine-style show.
- Iowa PBS Sports, a series of high school girls' championship events sanctioned by the IGHSAU including basketball, bowling, cross country, golf, soccer, softball, swimming and diving, tennis, track and field, and volleyball.
- Iowa Press, a political panel discussion show.
- Market to Market, a nationally distributed show about agribusiness.
- Road Trip Iowa, a travel documentary show.
- Studio 3 LIVE, a live music show.
- The Film Lounge, showcases short films.
- The Great American Recipe, a cooking competition show.
- Woodsmith Shop, a woodworking show.

Iowa PBS first began airing Doctor Who in 1974, shortly after the BBC first made it available to PBS stations via Time-Life Television. With the exception of a hiatus between 1979 and 1984, the station has aired the serial continuously since, one of the longest Doctor Who runs in the world.

== Friends of Iowa PBS ==
In 1970, Friends of Iowa Public Television (Iowa Public Television Foundation Board) was created for the development, growth and support of Iowa PBS through the building of a strong statewide membership base. Its 65,000 member households across Iowa and bordering states contribute nearly 90% of the out-of-pocket costs for acquiring and producing general audience programming. When IPTV rebranded as Iowa PBS in December 2019, Friends of Iowa Public Television changed its name to Friends of Iowa PBS.
