= Alleman, Iowa =

- City
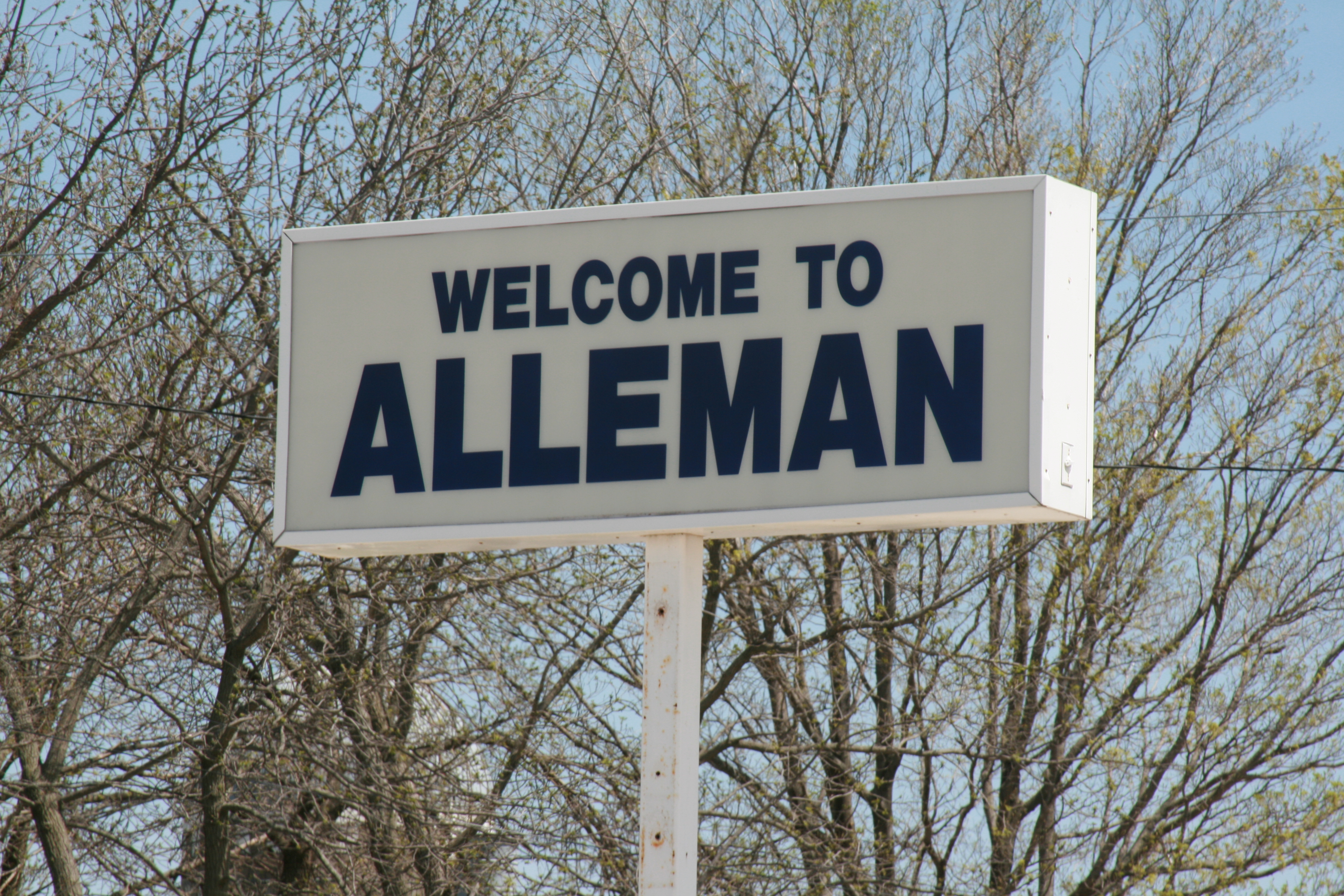
- Alleman welcome sign

- Logo

- Location within Polk County and Iowa
- Coordinates: 41°48′58″N 93°37′15″W
- Country: United States
- State: Iowa
- County: Polk
- Township: Lincoln
- Incorporated: May 18, 1973

Area
  - Total: 2.46 sq mi (6.38 km^{2})
  - Land: 2.46 sq mi (6.38 km^{2})
  - Water: 0 sq mi (0.00 km^{2})
- Elevation: 1,001 ft (305 m)

Population (2020)
  - Total: 423
  - Density: 171.6/sq mi (66.27/km^{2})
- Time zone: UTC-6 (Central (CST))
  - Summer (DST): UTC-5 (CDT)
- ZIP code: 50007
- Area code: 515
- FIPS code: 19-01180
- GNIS feature ID: 2393920
- Website: www.allemaniowa.org

Alleman is a city in Lincoln Township, Polk County, Iowa, United States. The population was 423 at the 2020 census. It is part of the Des Moines–West Des Moines Metropolitan Statistical Area.

== History ==
Alleman was named for early settler brothers George and John L. Allemann. They immigrated from the small town of Untervaz in Canton Grisons in Switzerland. It did not incorporate as a city until May 18, 1973, making it the most recent city to incorporate in Polk County.

== Geography ==
According to the United States Census Bureau, the city has a total area of 2.70 square miles (6.99 km^{2}), all land.

== Demographics ==
Historical populations
Year	Pop.	±%
1980	307	—
1990	340	+10.7%
2000	439	+29.1%
2010	432	−1.6%
2020	423	−2.1%
Source:"U.S. Census website". United States Census Bureau. and Iowa Data Center; Source: U.S. Decennial Census

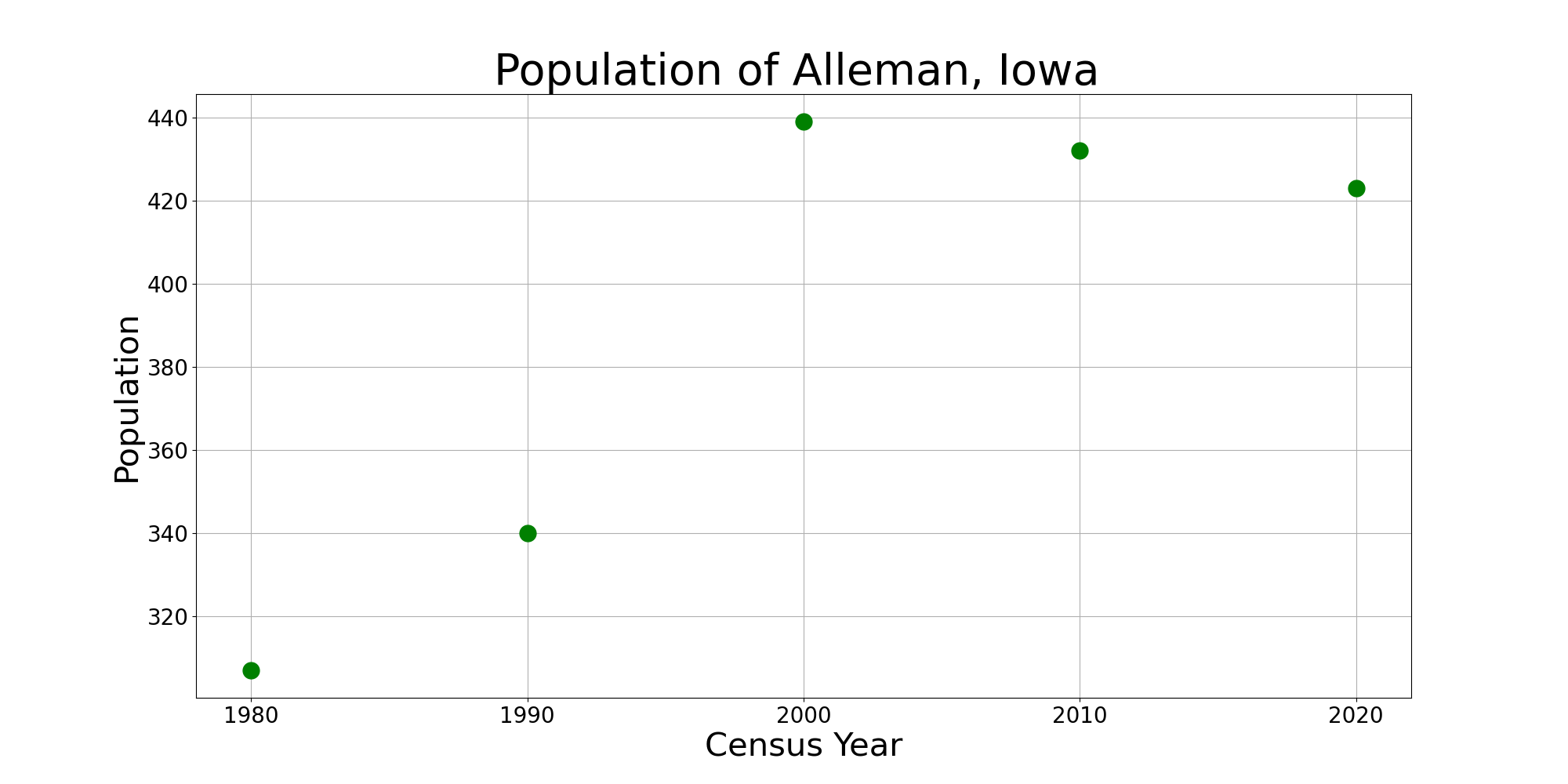
The population of Alleman, Iowa from US census data

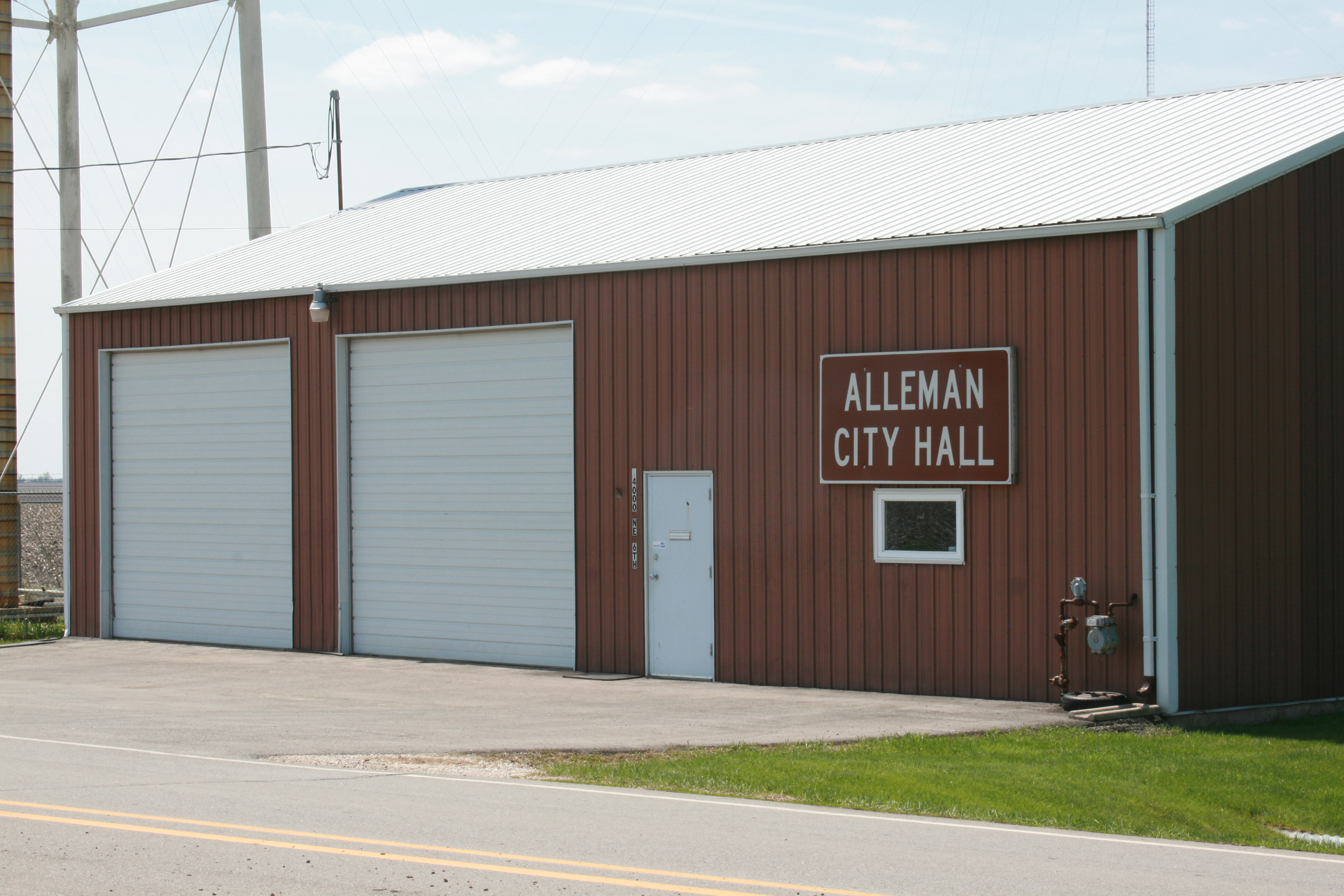
Alleman City Hall

=== 2020 census ===
As of the census of 2020, there were 423 people, 157 households, and 135 families residing in the city. The population density was 171.6 inhabitants per square mile (66.3/km^{2}). There were 157 housing units at an average density of 63.7 per square mile (24.6/km^{2}). The racial makeup of the city was 97.6% White, 0.7% Black or African American, 0.0% Native American, 0.2% Asian, 0.0% Pacific Islander, 0.0% from other races and 1.4% from two or more races. Hispanic or Latino persons of any race comprised 1.4% of the population.

Of the 157 households, 36.9% of which had children under the age of 18 living with them, 79.6% were married couples living together, 3.2% were cohabitating couples, 9.6% had a female householder with no spouse or partner present and 7.6% had a male householder with no spouse or partner present. 14.0% of all households were non-families. 10.8% of all households were made up of individuals, 1.9% had someone living alone who was 65 years old or older.

The median age in the city was 45.3 years. 24.1% of the residents were under the age of 20; 3.8% were between the ages of 20 and 24; 21.3% were from 25 and 44; 35.5% were from 45 and 64; and 15.4% were 65 years of age or older. The gender makeup of the city was 51.3% male and 48.7% female.

=== 2010 census ===
As of the census of 2010, there were 432 people, 151 households, and 130 families residing in the city. The population density was 160.0 inhabitants per square mile (61.8/km^{2}). There were 152 housing units at an average density of 56.3 per square mile (21.7/km^{2}). The racial makeup of the city was 98.4% White, 0.2% Asian, and 1.4% from two or more races.

There were 151 households, of which 37.7% had children under the age of 18 living with them, 74.2% were married couples living together, 8.6% had a female householder with no husband present, 3.3% had a male householder with no wife present, and 13.9% were non-families. 11.3% of all households were made up of individuals, and 2.7% had someone living alone who was 65 years of age or older. The average household size was 2.86 and the average family size was 3.09.

The median age in the city was 41.3 years. 28.5% of residents were under the age of 18; 7% were between the ages of 18 and 24; 21.3% were from 25 to 44; 35.9% were from 45 to 64; and 7.4% were 65 years of age or older. The gender makeup of the city was 50.5% male and 49.5% female.

=== 2000 census ===
As of the census of 2000, there were 439 people, 140 households, and 132 families residing in the city. The population density was 176.9 inhabitants per square mile (68.3/km^{2}). There were 142 housing units at an average density of 57.2 per square mile (22.1/km^{2}). The racial makeup of the city was 99.32% White, 0.23% Asian, and 0.46% from two or more races. Hispanic or Latino of any race were 0.46% of the population.

There were 140 households, out of which 47.9% had children under the age of 18 living with them, 86.4% were married couples living together, 5.7% had a female householder with no husband present, and 5.7% were non-families. 4.3% of all households were made up of individuals, and 2.1% had someone living alone who was 65 years of age or older. The average household size was 3.14 and the average family size was 3.23.

31.7% are under the age of 18, 4.8% from 18 to 24, 31.4% from 25 to 44, 25.1% from 45 to 64, and 7.1% who were 65 years of age or older. The median age was 37 years. For every 100 females, there were 100.5 males. For every 100 females age 18 and over, there were 94.8 males.

As of the 2000 census, the median income for a household in the city was $66,458 and the median income for a family was $66,154. Males had a median income of $45,000 versus $31,719 for females. The per capita income for the city was $20,970. About 1.5% of families and 1.6% of the population were below the poverty line, including 2.3% of those under age 18 and none of those age 65 or over.

== Economy ==
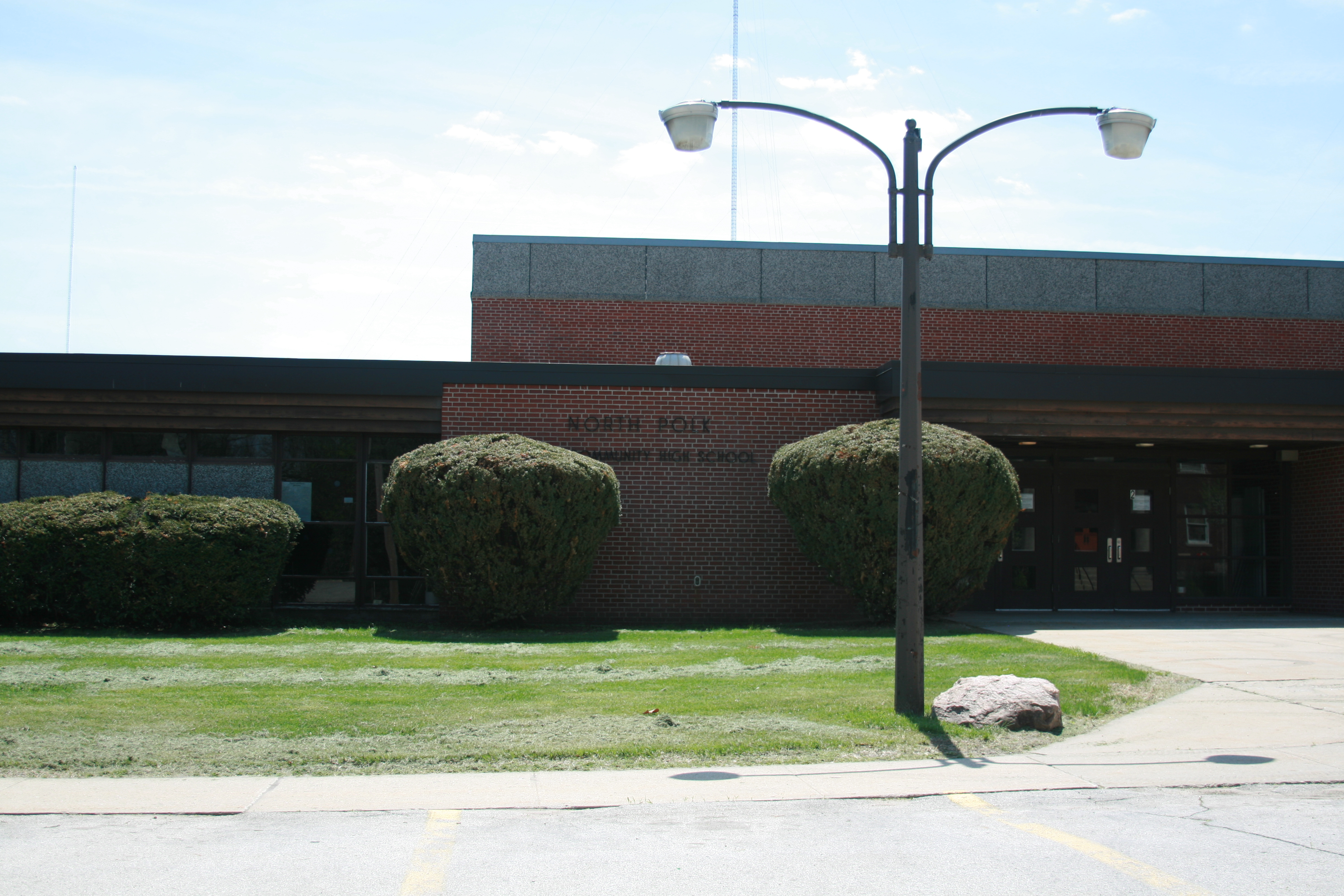
North Polk Community High School

The Heartland Cooperative grain storage facility is located in Alleman, with a capacity of 774,000 US bushels (27,300,000 L).

== Education ==
The community is within the North Polk Community School District. Alleman is the home of North Polk High School, North Polk Middle School, North Polk Central Elementary School, North Polk bus barn, and the North Polk District Office. A new high school and outdoor activities facility were opened in 2013.

== Media ==
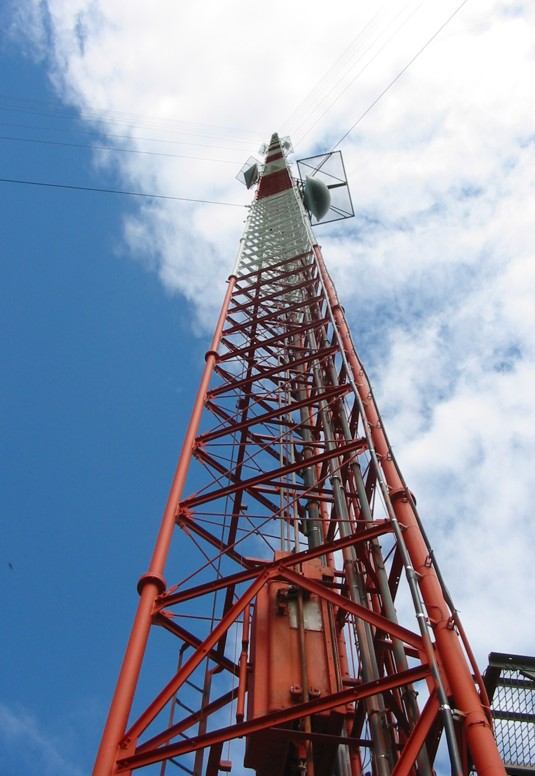
Local TV Iowa Tower in Alleman

Because of its central location and relatively high altitude for central Iowa, two Doppler weather radar stations are located in Alleman: WHO-TV 13's First Alert Mega Doppler, and KCCI-TV 8's Super Doppler 8. A storm in July 2011 resulted in the radome from the Mega Doppler being torn from the structure.

Because Alleman is located about midway between Des Moines and Ames, many radio and television stations transmit from towers located in the town. These towers include some of the world's tallest structures, reaching over 600 metres (2,000 ft). Along with the towers, a large portion of the Alleman low-altitude airspace is obstructed by the many guy-wires supporting the structures, making the area extremely hazardous for small, low-altitude aircraft. The specific antennas are:

- Local TV Iowa Tower Alleman, 609.6 m (2,000 ft), constructed in 1972.
- Des Moines Hearst-Argyle Television Tower Alleman, 609.6 m (2,000 ft), constructed in 1974.
- Saga Communications Tower Alleman, 469.1 m (1,539 ft), constructed in 1982.
- American Towers Tower Alleman, 609.3 m (1,999 ft), constructed in 2001.
