= Plambeck =

Plambeck is a surname. Notable people with the surname include:

- Edmund Plambeck, German entrepreneur and sports promoter, namesake of a football stadium in Norderstedt
- Erica Plambeck, American operations researcher
- Herb Plambeck (1908–2001), American agricultural journalist and administrator
- Joachim Plambeck, German immigrant to Iowa, owner of Joachim Plambeck House
- Juliane Plambeck (1952–1980), German Red Army Faction terrorist
- Norbert and Otto Plambeck, founders of German wind energy company PNE AG and namesakes of Plambeck Bulgarian Wind Farm
- Preston Plambeck (born 2006), American footballer
