= KXNO =

KXNO may refer to:

- KXNO (AM), a radio station (1460 AM) licensed to serve Des Moines, Iowa, United States
- KXNO-FM, a radio station (106.3 FM) licensed to serve Ankeny, Iowa
- North Auxiliary Airfield (ICAO location indicator: KXNO), a military airfield near North, South Carolina, United States
