= KKSO =

KKSO may refer to:

- KKSO (FM), a radio station (88.9 FM) licensed to Mitchellville, Iowa, United States
- KKSO (AM), a radio station (1390 AM) formerly licensed to Des Moines, Iowa
