= WHO (AM) =

Clear-channel news/talk radio station in Des Moines, Iowa

- Des Moines, Iowa; United States
- Broadcast area: Des Moines metropolitan area
- Frequency: 1040 kHz
- Branding: NewsRadio 1040 WHO

Programming
- Format: News Talk Information
- Affiliations: 24/7 News; Premiere Networks; Westwood One; Hawkeyes Sports Radio Network

Ownership
- Owner: iHeartMedia, Inc.; (iHM Licenses, LLC)
- Sister stations: KASI; KCYZ; KDRB; KKDM; KXNO; KXNO-FM

History
- First air date: April 10, 1924
- Former call signs: WHO (1924–1933); WOC-WHO (1933–1934)
- Former frequencies: 570 kHz (1924–1927); 560 kHz (1927–1928); 1000 kHz (1928–1941)

Technical information
- Licensing authority: FCC
- Facility ID: 51331
- Class: A
- Power: 50,000 watts
- Transmitter coordinates: 41°39′10″N 93°21′1″W (main antenna); 41°39′10″N 93°21′7″W (auxiliary antenna)
- Repeater: 100.3 KDRB-HD2 (Des Moines)

Links
- Public license information: Public file; LMS
- Webcast: Listen live (via iHeartRadio)
- Website: whoradio.iheart.com

WHO (1040 kHz "Newsradio 1040") is a commercial AM radio station in Des Moines, Iowa, United States. The station is owned by iHeartMedia and carries a conservative news talk information radio format, with studios on Grand Avenue in Des Moines.

WHO broadcasts with 50,000 watts, the maximum power permitted for AM stations in the United States. It uses a non-directional antenna from a transmitter site on 148th Street South in Mitchellville, Iowa. WHO programming is also heard on the second HD Radio digital subchannel of co-owned KDRB (100.3 FM), and the station is Iowa's primary entry point station for the Emergency Alert System.

WHO dates back to the early days of broadcasting and is a Class A clear-channel station. The station is one of only two 50,000-watt AM radio stations in Iowa. The other is KXEL in Waterloo. However, WHO was originally a Class I-A, while KXEL was given Class I-B status, requiring a directional antenna at night, to avoid interfering with the other Class I-B station on 1540, ZNS-1 in Nassau, Bahamas. Due to WHO's high power and Iowa's flat land (with excellent soil conductivity), it has an unusually large daytime coverage area, equivalent to a full-power FM station. It provides at least secondary coverage to almost all of Iowa, as well as parts of Illinois, Missouri, Nebraska, Kansas, Wisconsin, Minnesota, and South Dakota. At night, it can be heard at night across much of North America with a good radio, but is strongest in the Central United States.

== Programming ==
Weekdays on WHO begin with a 3-hour news and information program, The WHO Morning Show. Two local hosts have talk shows on weekdays, Jeff Angelo in late mornings and Simon Conway in afternoon drive time. The rest of the schedule is made up of nationally syndicated programs, mostly from co-owned Premiere Networks: The Clay Travis and Buck Sexton Show, The Sean Hannity Show, Our American Stories with Lee Habeeb, Coast to Coast AM with George Noory and America in the Morning with John Trout.

Saturdays begin with a local show, Saturday Morning Live with Dave Bohl. Syndicated weekend programs include The Kim Komando Show, Armstrong & Getty, Sunday Nights with Bill Cunningham, The Weekend with Michael Brown, and The Ramsey Show with Dave Ramsey. Programs on investing, health, technology, pets and religion are also heard, some of which are paid brokered programming. Most hours begin with an update from Fox News Radio.

=== Sports ===
WHO has been the longtime flagship station of University of Iowa sports. Jim Zabel, who joined WHO in 1944, was the play-by-play voice for Hawkeyes football and basketball games from 1949 to 1996. That is when the University of Iowa licensed exclusive rights to do radio play-by-play to Learfield Sports, which picked Gary Dolphin as the play-by-play announcer for Hawkeyes men's and women's basketball.

=== State Fair ===
WHO broadcasts its local shows from the Iowa State Fair for the duration of that event.

=== Radiothon ===
Each December, WHO collaborates with the Pinky Swear Foundation to host the annual Pinky Swear Radiothon, a full day of storytelling and fundraising to support children with cancer and their families. The event features emotional interviews, family spotlights, and live donor calls. Over the past ten years, the radiothon has raised more than two million dollars to help cover everyday expenses such as housing, gas, and groceries for families facing childhood cancer.

== History ==
=== Early years ===
WHO began broadcasting on April 10, 1924. The station was originally owned by Bankers Life in Des Moines, which is now the Principal Financial Group. Since January 1923, most radio stations in Iowa have been assigned call signs starting with "K", so WHO is unusual in starting with "W", normally reserved for stations located east of the Mississippi River. WHO dates back to a period when new call signs generally were four letters, from a sequential list, but sometimes were only three letters long. Because its call letters were issued outside of the pattern normally employed at the time, there has been speculation that they might have been chosen to stand for "We Help Others" or the question "Who?". For many years, WHO has used an owl as its mascot, a play on its call letters, pronounced like an owl's call.

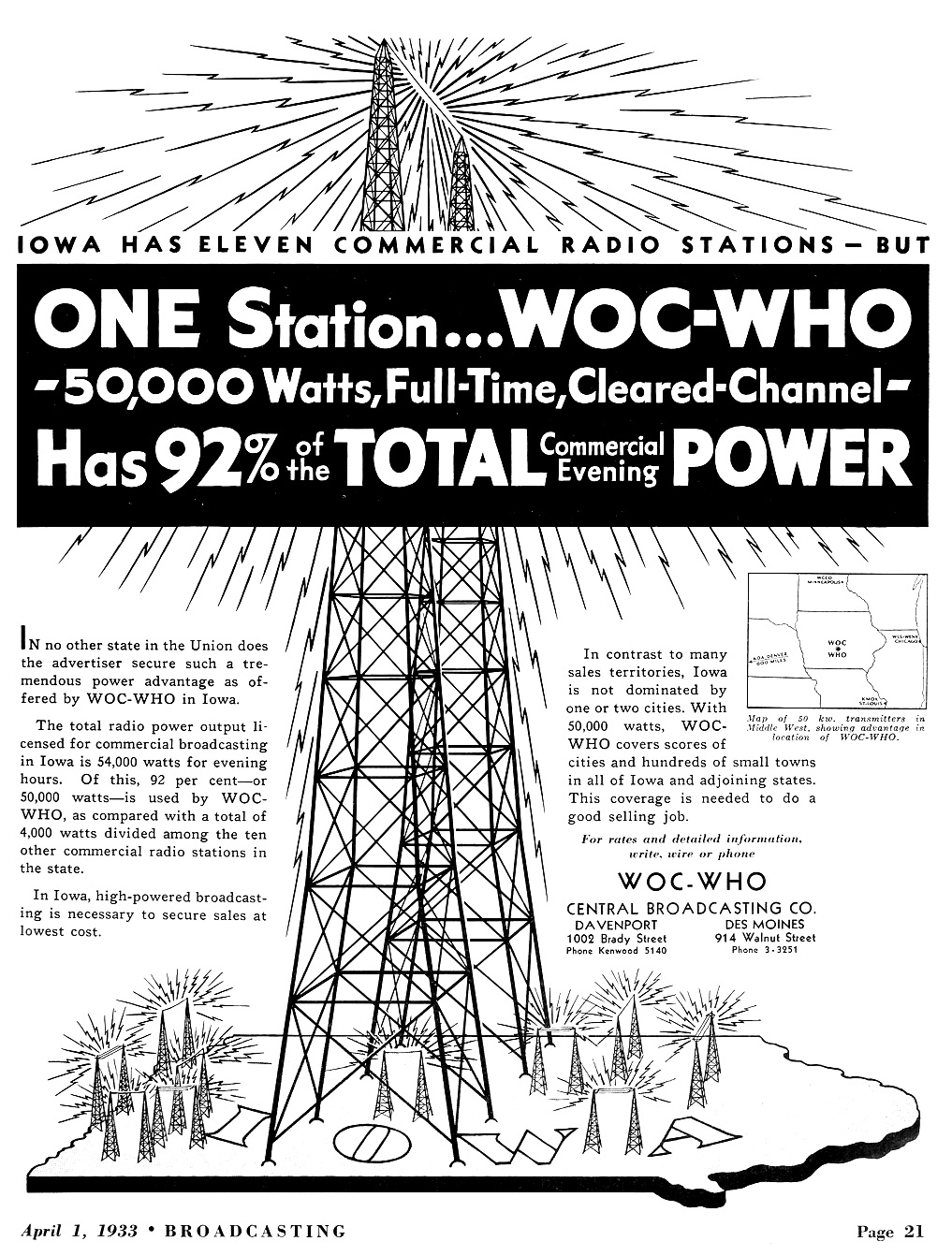
Advertisement for consolidated WOC-WHO (1933)

The original studios were on the top floor of the Liberty Building in downtown Des Moines. After the FRC's General Order 40 reallocated frequencies in 1928, WHO was assigned to 1000 kHz on a time-sharing basis with WOC in Davenport.

In late 1929, the Central Broadcasting Company was formed with B. J. Palmer as chairman. This company purchased both WOC and WHO, which were then synchronized to simultaneously broadcast identical programs on their shared frequency, each using a 5 kilowatt transmitter. In April 1932, a 50 kilowatt transmitter, located near Mitchellville, Iowa, and close to Des Moines, went into service, and the separate transmitters were replaced by this single transmitter, with the two stations now combined under a dual identity as WOC-WHO. WOC was restored as a separate station in November 1934, when the Palmer School purchased station KICK in Carter Lake, Iowa, which was moved to Davenport, and its call sign changed to WOC, with the Des Moines station reverting to just WHO.

Through most of its early years, WHO was a network affiliate of the NBC Red Network, broadcasting comedies, dramas, game shows, soap operas, sports and big bands. WHO moved from 1000 AM to the current 1040 on March 29, 1941, as a result of the North American Regional Broadcasting Agreement (NARBA).

=== WHO-FM and WHO-TV ===
In 1948, WHO-FM (100.3) signed on the air. Originally WHO-FM simulcast most of the programming heard on 1040 AM. In 1967, WHO-FM switched to classical music and beautiful music. The FM station has changed formats and call letters several times since then and now broadcasts as KDRB, "100.3 The Bus". In 1954, WHO-TV began broadcasting on channel 13. Because WHO radio was a long-time affiliate of NBC Radio, the TV station also affiliated with the NBC Television Network.

WHO was continuously owned by the Palmer family for more than 70 years, until Jacor Broadcasting purchased the station in 1997. Jacor merged with Clear Channel Communications (now iHeartMedia) a year later. WHO and the other Clear Channel radio stations in Des Moines (KDRB, KKDM, KLYF, and KXNO) continued to share a building with WHO-TV until moving into a new facility in 2005.

== Alumni ==
Herb Plambeck was a farm reporter for many years from 1936 to 1976. Talk-show host Steve Deace started his broadcast career at WHO.

Until his death in 2013, Jim Zabel remained with WHO as co-host (with Jon Miller of HawkeyeNation) of the Sound Off sports talk show that aired on Saturdays during Hawkeyes seasons, and as co-host of Two Guys Named Jim on Sunday nights with former Iowa State University football coach Jim Walden.

=== Ronald Reagan ===
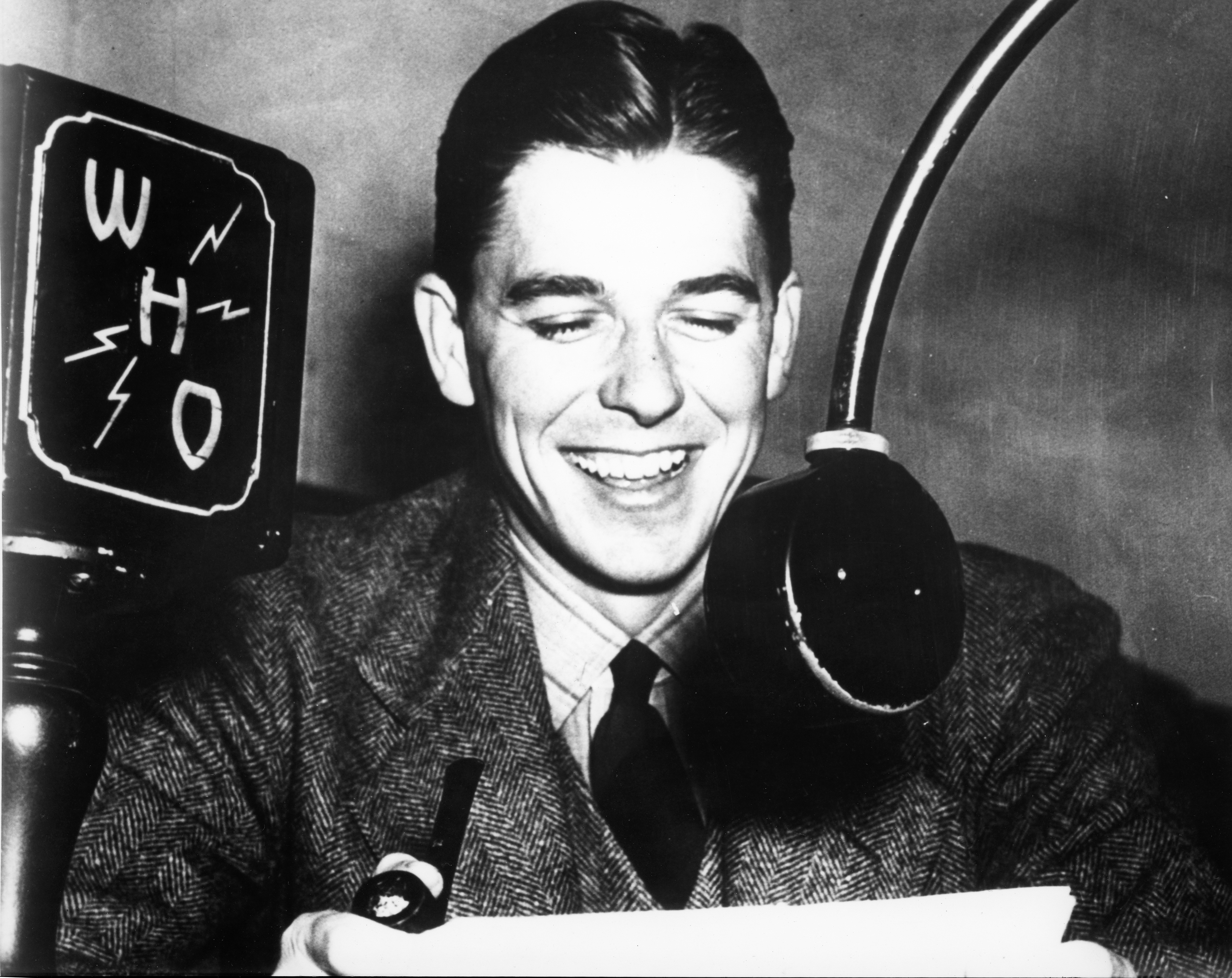
Ronald Reagan working for WHO in the mid-1930s

Future United States President Ronald Reagan worked as a sportscaster with WHO from 1932 to 1937. Among his duties were re-creations of Chicago Cubs baseball games. Reagan received details over a teleprinter for each play and would speak as if he were live from the stadium, improvising details such as facial expressions of players or the color of the sky. This practice was common prior to television.

Around 1935, Reagan became a host on a WHO news show featuring commentary by H. R. Gross, who would later be elected to the United States House of Representatives for Iowa's 3rd congressional district in 1948. On that show, Reagan also interviewed such celebrities as Leslie Howard and Aimee Semple McPherson.

== See also ==
- List of three-letter broadcast call signs in the United States
