= KCBC (disambiguation) =

KCBC may refer to:

- KCBC, a radio station (770 AM) licensed to serve Manteca, California, United States
- KCBC-FM (defunct), a defunct radio station in Des Moines, Iowa
- Connect Radio 97.2 & 107.4, a station formerly known as KCBC in Kettering and Corby, Northamptonshire
- Kerala Catholic Bishops' Council, a Catholic Bishops' council in Kerala, India
- Keble College Boat Club, the boat club of Keble College, Oxford
- King's College Boat Club, the boat club of King's College, Cambridge
