= KCBC-FM =

Radio station in Des Moines, Iowa, United States (1949–1952)

- Des Moines, Iowa; United States
- Frequency: 94.1 MHz
- Branding: KCBC 94

Programming
- Format: Easy listening

Ownership
- Owner: Capital City Broadcasting Company

History
- First air date: 1949
- Last air date: 1952

Technical information
- ERP: 10,000 watts

KCBC-FM (94.1 FM, "KCBC 94") was a radio station in Des Moines, Iowa, from 1949 to 1952. Its studios were located at 2323 Grand Avenue on the near west side of Des Moines. The original transmitter and tower were also located on the property until 1950. In 1950, KCBC purchased the former WHO-FM transmitter and tower on top of the Equitable Building at 6th and Locust in downtown Des Moines.

== History ==
KCBC-FM adopted an easy listening format, targeted at people riding the city's buses. At the rear of KCBC's Grand Avenue property there was a barn where they installed FM receivers in the city's buses. The plan to provide music and advertisements to the city's bus riders was not a profitable one, and after just four years, KCBC-FM left the air, donating its transmitter to the Des Moines Public Schools. The school district used the transmitter to put KDPS on air the same year on 88.1 FM. After KCBC-FM's license was deleted on December 9, 1952, no other station in Des Moines used the 94.1 frequency until 2005, when a low-powered radio station from Grand View University, KGVC-LP, signed on, which later shared frequency with KDRA-LP.
