= Steve Deace =

American conservative activist

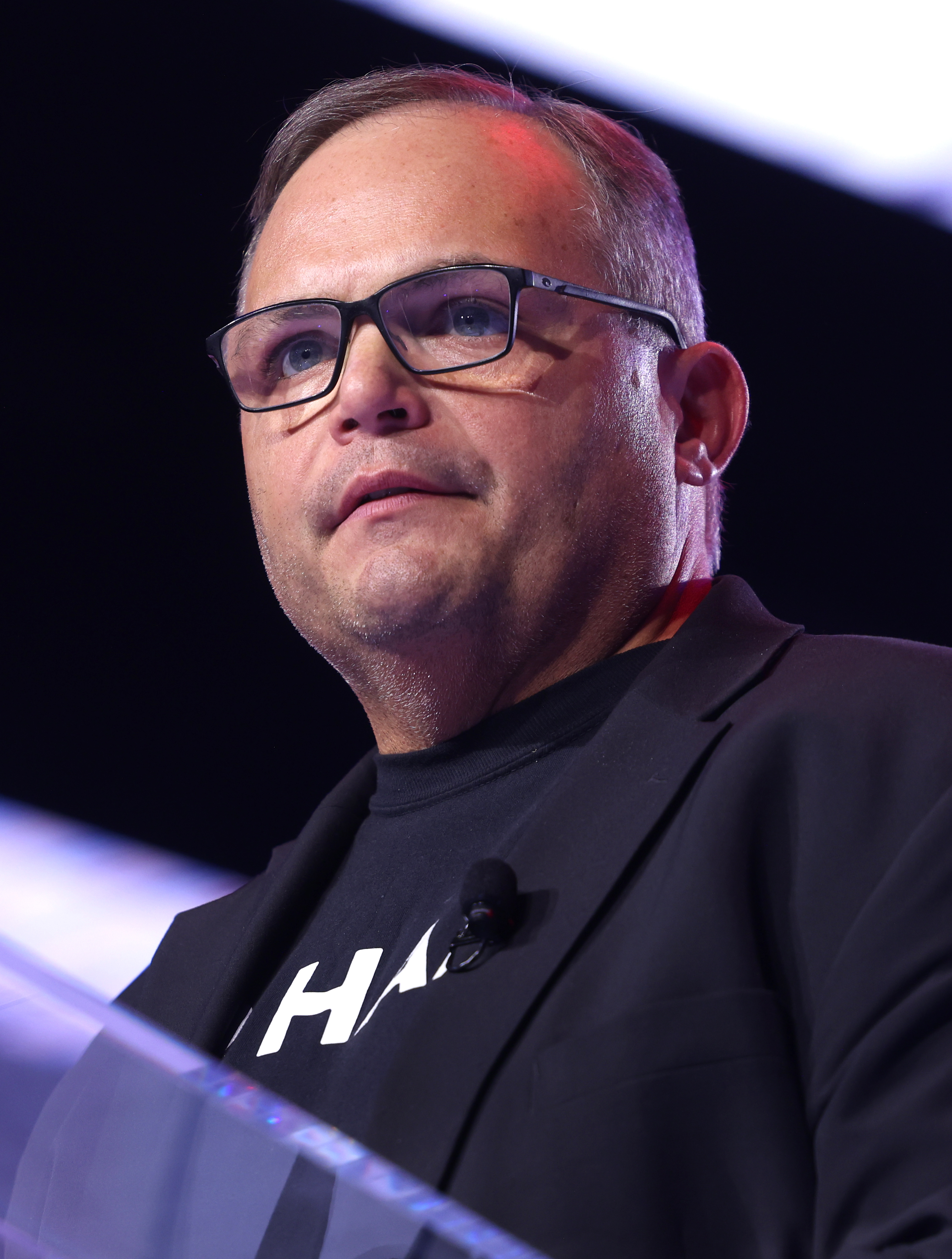
- Deace in 2025
- Born: Steven James Deace; July 28, 1973 (age 53); Des Moines, Iowa, U.S.
- Education: Michigan State University (attended)
- Political party: Independent
- Spouse: Amy Deace (m. 1997)

Steven James Deace (born July 28, 1973) is an American conservative talk show host and author. His program The Steve Deace Show is on the Blaze Media platform.

== Early life ==
Deace was born Steven James McNeely on July 28, 1973 to Vickie McNeely, who was 14 years old and not married at the time. She went on to raise him and one other child as a single mother in the Grand Rapids, Michigan area. McNeely later married when Deace was three years old. Although he was not formally adopted, Deace bears his stepfather's surname. He attended Michigan State University in the early 1990s but later dropped out of school.

== Career ==
Deace's first job was as a sports reporter for The Des Moines Register. He then hosted a sports talk show on KXNO (AM) and later an evening drive talk show on WHO (AM). While at WHO, Deace endorsed and gave airtime to the Republican presidential candidate Mike Huckabee during the 2008 Iowa caucuses, which helped Huckabee win the state's presidential primary. In 2010, he helped the successful campaign to defeat three members of the Iowa Supreme Court who approved same-sex marriage.

Deace left WHO in early 2011 to launch a nationally-syndicated radio program, The Steve Deace Show, on the Truth Radio Network. Later that year, Salem Radio Network picked up his program and moved it to primetime.

During the 2012 election, Deace was a major critic of Republican nominee Mitt Romney. Citing Romney's changing positions on numerous political issues, Deace did not support Romney in either the primary or the general elections that year.

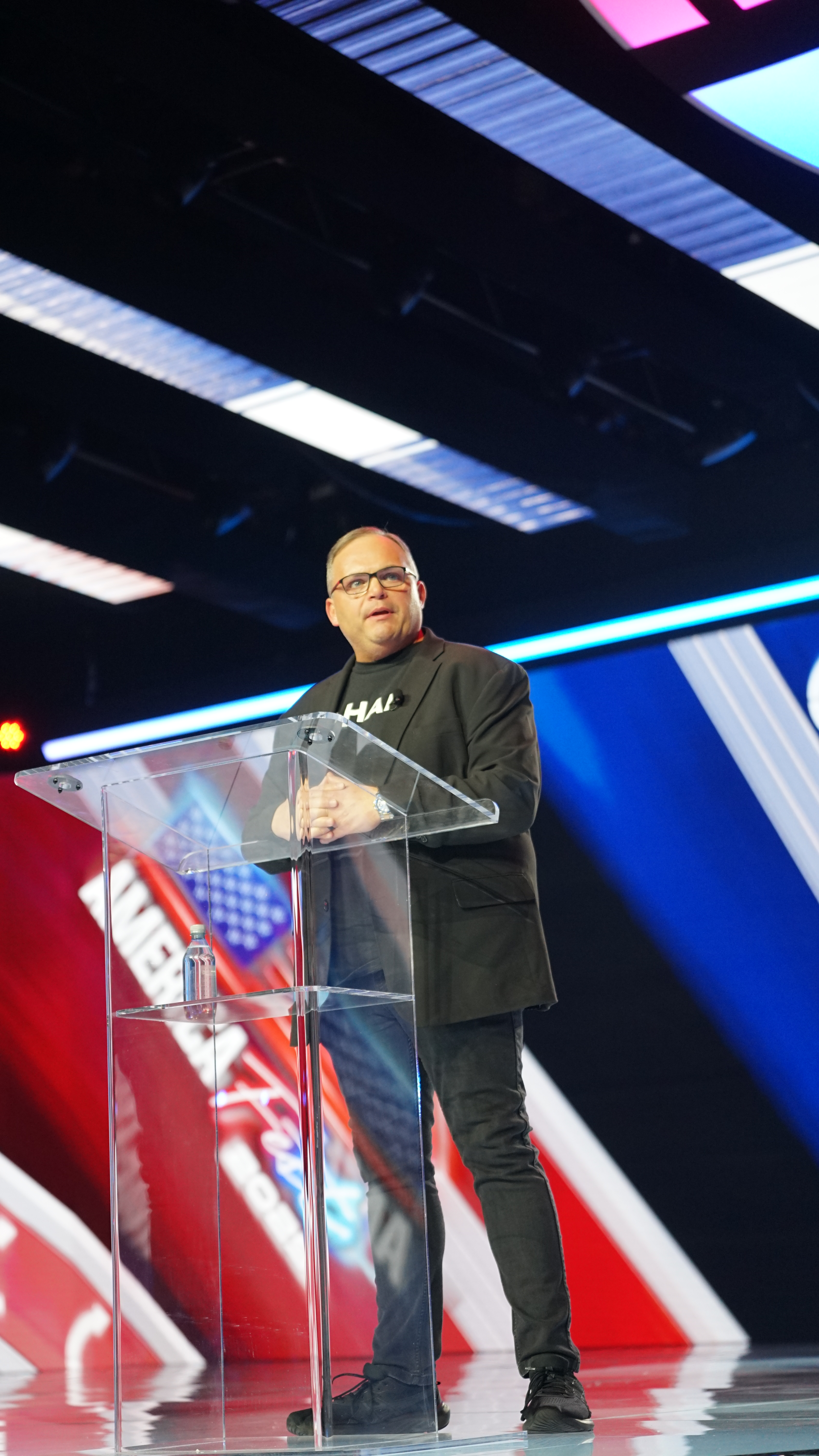
Deace at AmericaFest 2025

Deace endorsed Ted Cruz for president in 2016 and worked as a senior campaign operative in Iowa for Cruz's presidential campaign. In February 2016, Cruz would go on to win the Iowa caucuses. After Cruz dropped out of the race in May 2016, he posted a voter registration form with a check mark next to "no party" in response to calls for Republican unity behind Donald Trump and his presidential campaign. When Ted Cruz endorsed Trump in September 2016, Deace said that it was "the worst political miscalculation of my lifetime.” He went on to vote for the Constitution Party's candidate, Darrell Castle, in the general election.

In 2017, Deace's program moved to CRTV, a conservative streaming platform. Later that year, he defended Steve Bannon's role in the White House and argued that it would be a mistake for Trump to fire Bannon because of the signal it would send to conservatives. In 2018, his program moved to BlazeTV after CRTV merged with it.

During the 2020 election, Deace announced he was voting for Trump. When it was apparent that Joe Biden was defeating Trump, Deace cast doubt about the validity of the vote in swing states and said, "When you went to bed Trump was ahead and the counting miraculously stopped. When you woke up it resumed, with Biden garnering Chavez-like totals in the dead of night. This is a coup."

Deace is a COVID-19 vaccine skeptic, believing it to be part of a “depopulation scheme”. He has referred to vaccines as "poison".

In August 2023, Deace endorsed Florida Governor Ron DeSantis in the 2024 presidential primary.

== Personal life ==
He and his wife, Amy, have three children. Deace is a Christian and converted in 2003 after attending a Promise Keepers rally.

== Bibliography ==
=== Fiction ===
- A Nefarious Plot. Post Hill Press. 2016. ISBN 978-1-61-868823-1
- A Nefarious Carol. Post Hill Press. 2020. ISBN 978-1642937862
- Richie Meets the Rainbow: A Heartwarming Tale of Childhood Enlightenment. Keynote Publishing. 2025. ISBN 979-8-9986359-2-2

=== Non-fiction ===
- Rules for Patriots: How Conservatives Can Win Again. Post Hill Press. 2014. ISBN 978-1618689900
- Truth Bombs: Confronting the Lies Conservatives Believe (To Our Own Demise). Post Hill Press. 2019 ISBN 978-1642930221
- Faucian Bargain: The Most Powerful and Dangerous Bureaucrat in American History. Post Hill Press. 2021. ISBN 979-8495352636
- Do What You Believe: Or You Won’t Be Free to Believe It Much Longer. 2022. ISBN 978-1637586075
- Rise of the Fourth Reich: Confronting COVID Fascism with a New Nuremberg Trial, So This Never Happens Again. 2023. ISBN 978-1637587522

== See also ==
- Nefarious - 2023 horror film based on Deace's 2016 novel A Nefarious Plot.
