= KIKD =

Coordinates: 42.121°N 94.814°W

KIKD-FM
- Lake City, Iowa; United States
- Broadcast area: Carroll, Iowa
- Frequency: 106.7 (MHz)
- Branding: Kick 106.7

Programming
- Format: Hot Country

Ownership
- Owner: Carroll Broadcasting Company

History
- First air date: St. Patricks's Day, 1996

Technical information
- Class: C3
- ERP: 25,000 watts

Links
- Website: www.kick1067.com

KIKD (106.7 FM, "Kick 106.7") is an FM radio station based in Carroll, Iowa. The station plays Country music. KIKD is part of Carroll Broadcasting, along with KKRL and KCIM.

== History ==
KIKD-FM signed on the air on St. Patrick's Day, 1996, under the ownership of the Betty Baudler Horras of Ames Broadcasting Company, owner of KCCQ-FM, and KASI-AM as well as a company that produces vinyl signs. On February 4, 1999, a bid was made for KIKD-FM from Carroll Broadcasting Company, owners of KKRL-FM and KCIM-AM. Later, KIKD's studios were moved from the corner of Highway 30 and Clark Street in Carroll to 1119 East Plaza Drive in Carroll. At the time of the bid, KIKD-FM and KCIM-AM were both country music stations. Later KCIM was forced to change its format. Neal Trobak, the Program Director at the time of the buyout, said, "I assume we will go to an easy-listening format of some kind, compatible with the age of the people that listen to us". KIKD was originally an automated Hot Country station under the direction of Bob Foster. In 1999, the station began using local hosts during the daytime hours 6 a.m.-10a.m. In 2000, KIKD extended their local hosts to 6 a.m.-6 p.m., then once again in 2008 from 5 a.m.-7 p.m.

== On-air staff and programming ==
KIKD's current morning announcer is Kristin Campisi. Other current announcers (as of July 2012) include Renie Osterlund, and Tiffini Young. The station airs shows dedicated to country music and is currently an affiliate of Westwood One.
