= KCCQ =

KCCQ may refer to:

- KCCQ-LP, a low-power radio station (105.9 FM) licensed to serve Crescent City, California, United States
- KCYZ, a radio station (105.1 FM) licensed to serve Ames, Iowa, United States, which held the call sign KCCQ from 1968 to 2014
