= Claus Untiedt House =

Historic house in Iowa, United States

- U.S. National Register of Historic Places
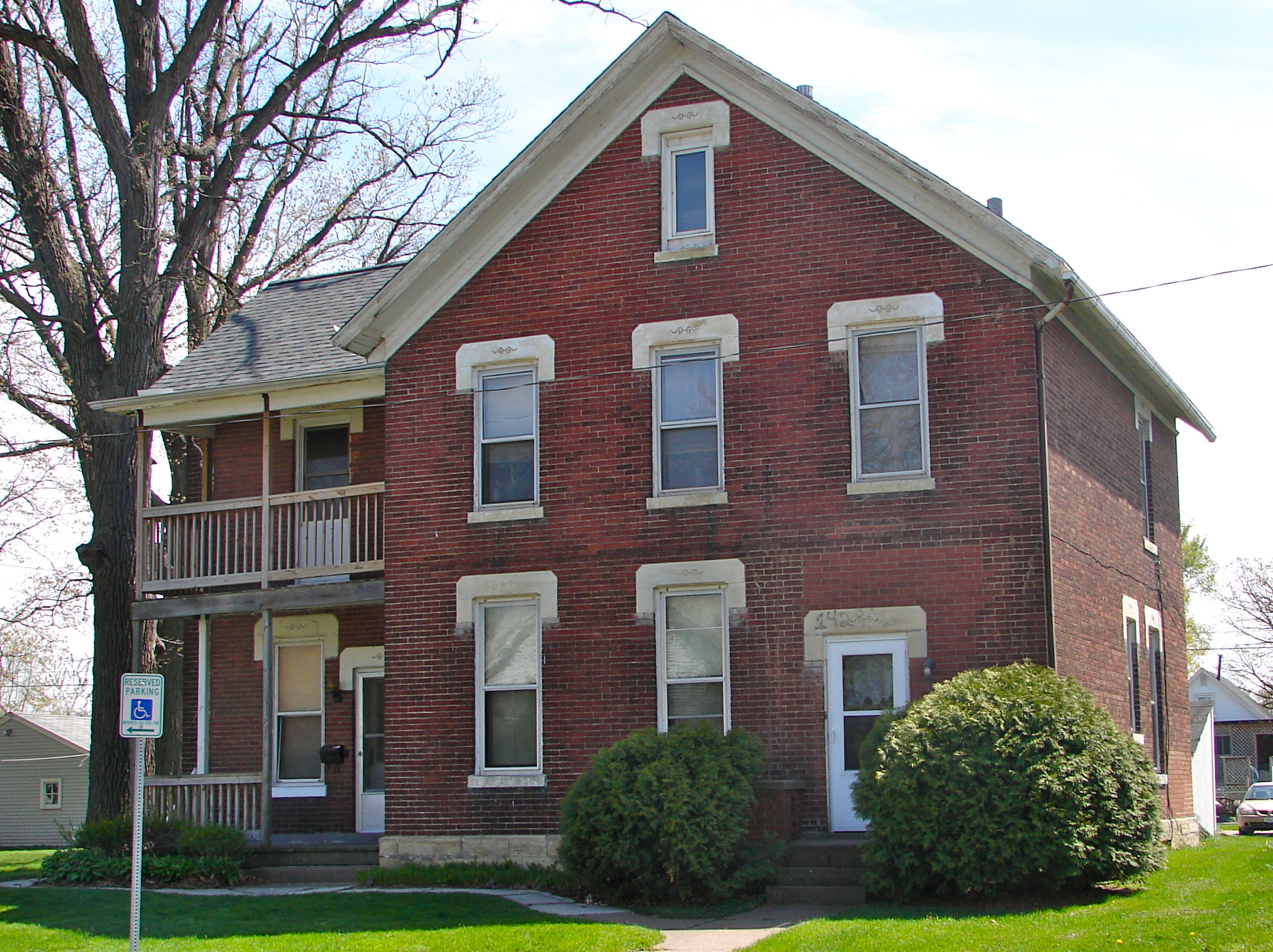

- Location within Iowa Location within the United States
- Location: 1429 W. 14th St. Davenport, Iowa
- Coordinates: 41°32′0.83″N 90°35′42.7″W
- Area: less than one acre
- Built: 1890
- Architectural style: Late Victorian
- MPS: Davenport MRA
- NRHP reference No.: 84001577
- Added to NRHP: July 27, 1984

The Claus Untiedt House is a historic building located in the West End of Davenport, Iowa, United States. It and the neighboring Joachim Plambeck House are replicas of each other, although the Plambeck House has more alterations. The 2-story Late Victorian style residence features a three-bay façade with a side entrance and a front gable. Two-story porches on the front and back of the east wing feature an Eastlake character. Stone hoods that sit flush with the exterior wall with drip lintels decorate the tops of the rectangular windows. The dark red brick structure rests on a stone foundation that has subsequently been covered with cement. The main entryway may have been altered and its porch may have been removed. The house has been listed on the National Register of Historic Places since 1984.
