= Love Your Melon =

Apparel company

Love Your Melon Inc.
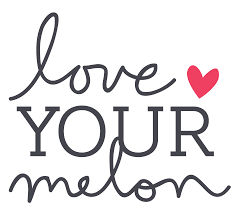
- Type: Private for-profit
- Industry: Retail
- Founded: 2012; 14 years ago
- Headquarters: Minneapolis, Minnesota, U.S.
- Key people: Zach Quinn-Founder; Brian Keller-Founder
- Products: Hats and apparel
- Revenue: $31.5M annually (as of 2017)

Love Your Melon Inc. is a for-profit company based in Minneapolis, Minnesota. Founded in October 2012 by Zach Quinn, son of Cafe Latte owners Pete and Linda Quinn, and Brian Keller with startup money, the company designs and markets most notably hats — as well as headbands, scarves, blankets and apparel.

Love Your Melon was a registered 501(c)(3) organization/non-profit through 2015. As of 2016, it has since been registered as Business Corporation (Domestic) with the Office of the Minnesota Secretary of State. Their mission statement is "dedicated to giving a hat to every child battling cancer and supporting the fight against pediatric cancer."

== History ==
Zach Quinn and Brian Keller met on the second day of an entrepreneurship class at the University of St. Thomas. They received a class project to start a business that made a profit by the end of the semester. Inspired by Blake Mycoskie's book about the founding of Toms Shoes and the concept of buy-one-product-donate-one-product, Quinn and Keller began their business by setting up a "Love Your Melon Beanie Stand" outside a restaurant owned by Quinn's family. The stand was stocked with 400 beanies from a knitting mill in Portland, Oregon and was based on Brian Quinn's design. The beanies were manufactured with loans from friends and family. Love Your Melon quickly took off with the stated purpose of "awareness for childhood cancers" and to "improve the quality of life for children battling cancer." The company received gifts, grants, and other contributions from 2014 to 2015. Moving to a private company in 2016, they have since worked with banks such as J.P. Morgan to finance their inventory growth. Love Your Melon Inc. opened its first retail store on September 29, 2018.

In 2025, one of the original founders, Zachary Quinn, reacquired the brand from Win Brands Group and relaunched it with an updated look as well as restoring the company's original Buy One, Give One model. The relaunch includes both classic and new collections, with each beanie sold tied to a donation of a beanie to a child battling cancer or to caregivers. Quinn indicated that this reacquisition was driven by a desire to bring the mission "back to its roots" with his family alongside him.

== Business Model ==
First inspired by the "one for one" model coined by Toms Shoes, the venture started with giving a beanie to a child battling cancer for every beanie sold. Love Your Melon was a registered 501(c)(3) organization/non-profit until 2016 when it registered as a private for-profit organization. The current model followed has been referred to as "caring capitalism" or "profits with principles" which relies on corporate social responsibility and community to obtain sales.

The company has built the brand through its use of Facebook and other social media as a primary advertising vehicle. Their return on a Facebook ad is seven — for every $100 it spends, it sees $700 in orders. As of 2017, Love Your Melon has been reported to spend $3-5 million a year on Facebook while tapping into a network of 14,000 ambassadors who are compensated with Love Your Melon gear and event opportunities.

While Love Your Melon started with sourcing manufacturing in Portland, Oregon, it now works with around 40 different suppliers including Minneapolis-based Softline Brand Partners and Minnesota Knitting Mills in St. Paul, Minnesota. The business has grown beyond the original product line to include scarves, blankets, T-shirts, sweatshirts, and other leisure apparel. The company has been able to scale nationally in less than five years and has a reported 2017 total revenue of $31.5 million.

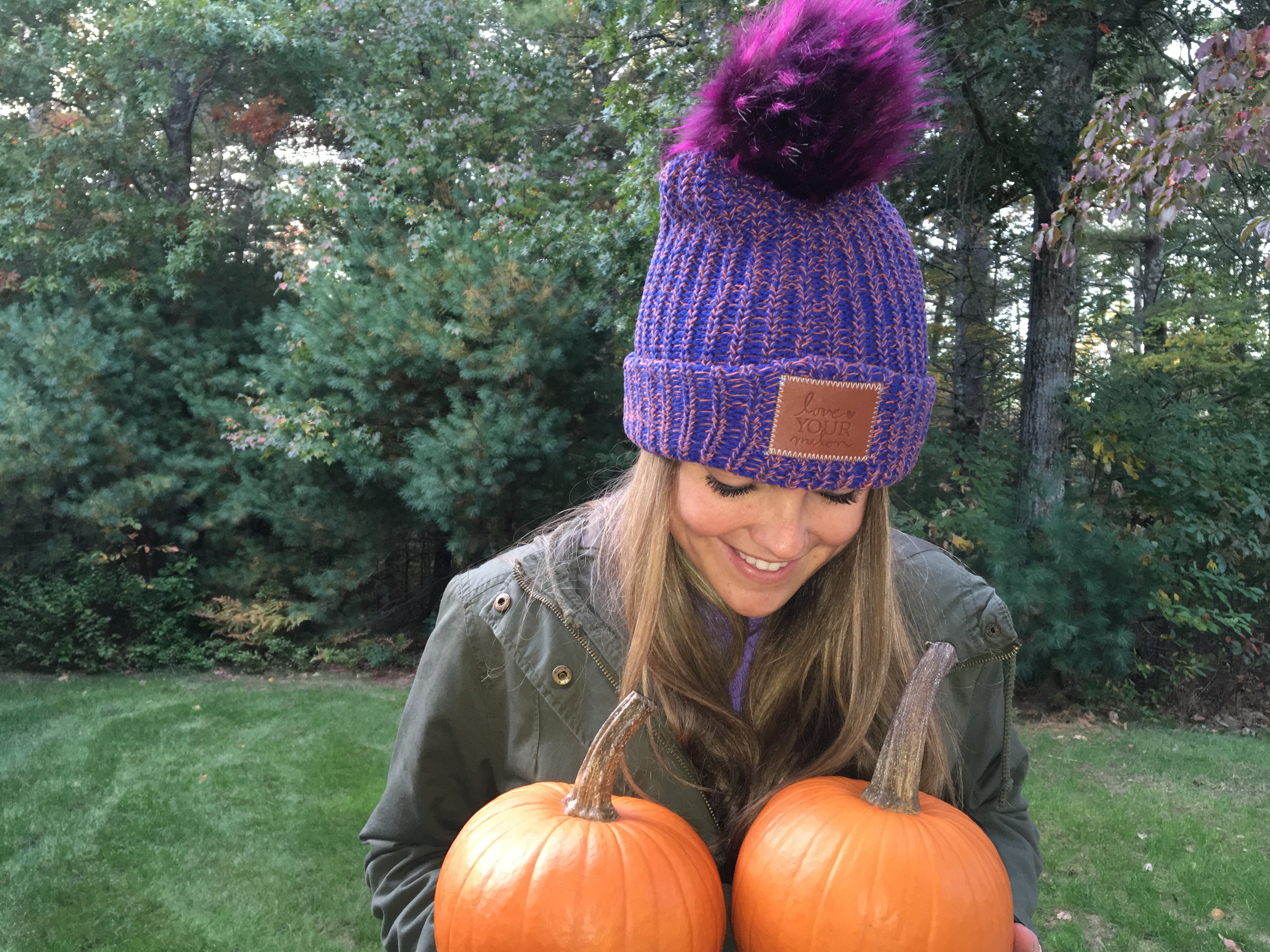
Example of Love Your Melon Pom Beanie

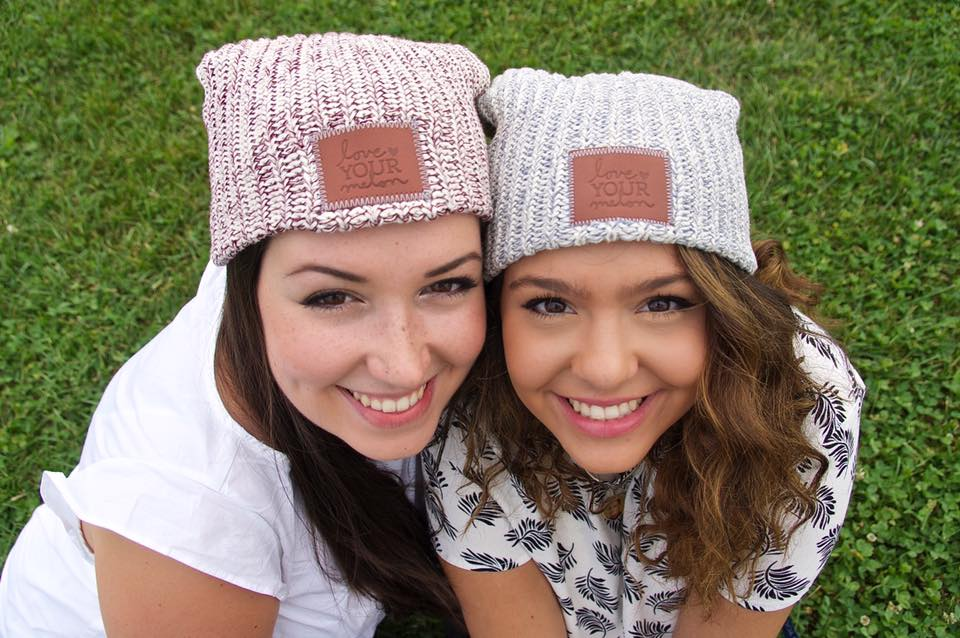
Example of Love Your Melon Speckled Beanies

== Philanthropy ==
Fifty percent (50%) of net profit from the sale of all Love Your Melon products is given to the Love Your Melon Fund to support nonprofit partners in the fight against pediatric cancer, create therapeutic experiences and fund charitable programming initiatives for children and families battling cancer. Their philanthropic partners currently include, but are not limited to, Pinky Swear Foundation, Make A Wish, St. Jude, Alex's Lemonade Stand, St. Baldricks Foundation, and Ronald McDonald House Charities.

In 2013, Quinn and Keller started the Love Your Melon Campus Crew program after taking a three-month long cross country trip selling hats, visiting hospitals and involving college students. The Love Your Melon Crew now helps facilitate Love Your Melon Beanie donations and other related events throughout the year.

In 2025, Love Your Melon announced its relaunch, reintroducing its signature Buy One, Give One program, which donates a hat to a child battling cancer for every product sold. The relaunch features new collections and a renewed commitment to supporting pediatric cancer organizations through product donations and charitable giving.
