= Nefarious (film) =

2023 Christian horror-thriller film

- Theatrical release poster
- Directed by: Cary Solomon; Chuck Konzelman
- Written by: Cary Solomon; Chuck Konzelman
- Based on: A Nefarious Plot by Steve Deace
- Produced by: Sheila Hart; Chuck Konzelman; Cary Solomon; Chris Jones
- Starring: Sean Patrick Flanery; Jordan Belfi; Tom Ohmer; Glenn Beck
- Cinematography: Jason Head
- Edited by: Brian Jeremiah Smith
- Music by: Bryan E. Miller
- Production company: Believe Entertainment
- Distributed by: Soli Deo Gloria Releasing
- Release date: April 14, 2023
- Running time: 97 minutes
- Country: United States
- Language: English
- Budget: $1 million
- Box office: $6 million

Nefarious is a 2023 American independent Christian horror-thriller film written and directed by Cary Solomon and Chuck Konzelman, based on Steve Deace's 2016 novel A Nefarious Plot. It stars Jordan Belfi as a psychiatrist who must determine if a convicted death row inmate (Sean Patrick Flanery) is faking his alleged demonic possession. The film was released on April 14, 2023.

== Plot ==
At a state penitentiary, psychiatrist Dr. James Martin arrives to evaluate a notorious serial killer named Edward Wayne Brady, who is currently a death-row inmate. The prison Warden Tom Moss warns Dr. Martin, who has just replaced Dr. Alan Fischer, who committed suicide after previously interviewing the inmate, that Edward is an expert manipulator who can "get inside your head." Edward is scheduled to be put to death by electrocution at 11:00 that night, and Dr. Martin is tasked with determining whether the killer is legally sane or if he is mentally ill and incompetent of the crimes he has committed. Moss hopes that Dr. Martin will disagree with Dr. Fischer who was ready to declare Edward insane.

In their first discussion, Edward inexplicably details various aspects of Dr. Martin's personal and professional life, and insists that he is a demon named Nefariamus who will answer to "Nefarious" inhabiting Edward's body. Nefarious states that he was able to possess Edward as he was not baptized and had committed sins in his childhood, such as stealing. He further details that, despite the doctor's initial assumption, he is not trying to escape punishment, and wants the body of his host to be executed. Nefarious tells Dr. Martin that before the day is over, he will also have committed three murders though the doctor states that this is impossible.

Nefarious accuses Dr. Martin of euthanizing his terminally-ill mother, as a means to acquire his inheritance from her. The doctor becomes defensive, stating that the decision was made after meticulous examination and angrily threatens to end their interview. Suspecting that Edward has dissociative identity disorder with Nefarious being an alter personality, Dr. Martin tries to speak directly with Edward, but only with limited success. Nefarious periodically allows his timid, beaten-down host to communicate as seen fit, while Dr. Martin then draws out the role of demons in the world through his discussions with Nefarious. Expressing his own personal beliefs as atheistic, Dr. Martin declares that Edward has an insane belief system, and resolves to certify the prisoner to be unfit to be executed for the murders. As the doctor is leaving however, Nefarious begins to talk about the doctor's troubled relationship with his pregnant girlfriend and claims that at that very moment she is at an abortion clinic, mistakenly determined to rid the couple's relationship of what she sees as the reason he might leave her. The demon likens the practice of abortion to ancient paganistic child sacrifices to Molech, and in counting down gleefully exclaims "all hell is rejoicing". Dr. Martin rushes to call his girlfriend only to find that the abortion has already taken place.

Upon returning to further evaluate Edward, the demonic personality continues to cause Dr. Martin to question his prognosis when the prisoner speaks in Latin. Nefarious tells the doctor, that he wants him to serve as the author of an already-written Satanic book titled The Dark Gospel, and offers to give him everything he wants from his master as was once offered to a carpenter in biblical times (Jesus), who declined. Explaining that he has chosen Dr. Martin to bring forth this work to deceive and mislead all of God's created human race, comparing the purpose of the book as the opposite of the Gospel in the New Testament. Nefarious claims to have known and been with Dr. Martin since he was a child. When the doctor is called away by Warden Moss, it is revealed that a scrapbook of Dr. Martin's life and the manuscript for The Dark Gospel have been found in the prisoner's cell.

Determining that the prisoner was intending to have Dr. Martin as his next victim, they confront Edward about what has been found. Nefarious causes the prisoner to dislocate digits on his hand, escaping his handcuffs and begins to strangle the doctor. Threatening to kill him unless he begs for his life, Dr. Martin concedes and tells him that he doesn't want to die. Releasing Dr. Martin, the prison guards forcefully apprehend the killer while Dr. Martin signs a document that declares Edward Wayne Brady as sane enough to be executed. In so doing, Nefarious declares that the doctor has committed three murders: his mother, his unborn child, and the prisoner.

Leading to the execution, a terrified Edward begins to plead for his life and continues to state that the murders were not his own actions. In his final moments, while sitting in the electric chair, Nefarious again takes control and asks Dr. Martin whether he accepts the offer that was made earlier in exchange for publishing the devil's gospel, to which Dr. Martin shakes his head. Edward suffers a painful and prolonged death by electrocution. The disembodied demonic Nefarious takes the chance to speak to the doctor stating that he should have taken the offer, before possessing Dr. Martin and forcing him to hold up a gun to those in attendance and then attempt suicide. Dr. Martin spontaneously asks God for help, and the gun he is using misfires.

One year later, a visibly changed Dr. Martin is in a TV studio promoting a novel he wrote titled A Nefarious Plot, explaining he has written it as a warning against the reality of the demonic forces tempting all of us. In the discussion during the interview, Dr. Martin concedes that he experienced a miracle as the firearm had been attempted three times while he was possessed and it did not work, as the gun when tested by forensics it functioned properly. Concluding that he is agnostic in his approach to what happened, he expressed interest in learning more about God and Christianity. Upon leaving the studio he encounters a homeless woman, who ominously addresses him by name and asks if Dr. Martin missed her — evidently now the possessed host of Nefarious. In a post-credits audio, the voice of Nefarious is heard to say in Aramaic and Latin, "You have been weighed in the balance and found wanting, but you are stupid that you do not understand. It is to be continued!" (Note: This is a general translation of the character's direct quote, which is: "Mene, Mene, techel upharsem. Autem stultus es ut non comprendias. Continuendum est!")

== Cast ==
- Sean Patrick Flanery as Edward Wayne Brady and Nefariamus / "Nefarious"
- Jordan Belfi as Dr. James Martin
- Tom Ohmer as Warden Tom Moss
- Glenn Beck as himself
- Daniel Martin Berkey as Father Louis
- Mark De Alessandro as Dr. Alan Fischer
- Cameron Arnett as Trustee Styles
- James Healy Jr. as Gate guard
- Sarah Hernandez as Corporal Mendez
- Jarret LeMaster as Officer Wilson
- Grifon Aldren as Sergeant Wilborn
- Eric Hanson as Assistant warden Anderson
- Stelio Savante as Detective Russo
- Robert Peters as Dr. Stewart
- Tina Toner as Renee Davenport
- Maura Corsini as Melanie Carter

== Production ==
The promotion of Deace's novel A Nefarious Plot by political commentator Glenn Beck led to a film adaptation being developed. Deace described the film as "as a cross between C.S. Lewis' The Screwtape Letters and the 1991 horror film Silence of the Lambs."

Principal photography took place in Oklahoma City in late 2021. During production, filming was temporarily halted due to a crew union strike.

Co-director Cary Solomon said the production was troubled. Solomon, a Catholic, said that many of the film's production issues were the results of demonic manifestations, including eight car crashes, equipment failure, electrical failure, frequent fire alarms, and faulty cameras. A Catholic priest was reportedly present on set while the film was shooting and performed an exorcism on the film's set during production.

== Release ==
=== Box office ===
Nefarious was theatrically released on April 14, 2023. It grossed $1.3 million from 933 theaters in its opening weekend, finishing 10th at the box office. The movie completed its box office run by earning $5.4 million from the 933 theaters it screened, before finding notable success on streaming, digital, and home media platforms.

=== Critical response ===
On the review aggregator website Rotten Tomatoes, 32% of 19 critics' reviews are positive, with an average rating of 4.5/10. The website's consensus reads: "Nefarious is well-mounted and boasts some solid performances, but it's hard to look past the story's heavy-handed proselytizing." Audiences polled by CinemaScore gave the film an average grade of "B+" on an A+ to F scale, while those polled by PostTrak gave it a 69% positive score, with 61% saying they would definitely recommend it.

Bill Goodykoontz of The Arizona Republic gave the film two stars of a possible five, stating that it lacked subtlety and that the expressed views of the demon were simply a mouthpiece for the filmmakers. Roger Moore of Movie Nation gave the film one star of a possible of four, expressing disdain over the script and its argument points, saying the film "fails as horror and as a laughably-loaded discourse on religion".

Bill Newcott of The Saturday Evening Post said of the film, "Nefarious may not be great filmmaking, but it is confident filmmaking, and sometimes that can get you exactly where you want to go." Michael John Petty of Collider favorably compared the movie and its source material to the 1998 film Fallen, The Conjuring series, and to a greater extent The Screwtape Letters by C. S. Lewis, and states that "Nefarious rises above the general clichés associated with faith-based productions and stands out as something increasingly more interesting than its religious contemporaries."

Adam R. Holz of Plugged In stated that "Nefarious is not your average thriller", further calling it "a provocative film". K.V. Turley of the National Catholic Register said that "Nefarious is an excellent movie. The acting is uniformly good; the direction assured; the plotting pitch-perfect. The story — essentially a two-hander — is an interesting-premise-turned-into-a-suspense-filled drama, with an ending that can never be taken for granted."

== Award ==
In 2023, the film was nominated by the Golden Trailer Awards for Best Independent Trailer.

== Future ==
Nefarious will expand into a multi-media franchise, with follow-ups to the film in active development.

In August 2023, author of the novels Steve Deace announced via his social media that following the successes of the movie, a sequel television series was in development. Confirming that Sean Patrick Flannery and Jordan Belfi are both scheduled to reprise their roles, the author stated that negotiations with distributing networks is ongoing. By July, the author stated that the ending scene of the first movie was intended to set another film. In October of the same year, the author confirmed that both a sequel series, and a sequel film are currently in development. The author stated that the sequel series will be first to be released, followed by the next movie which will be based on the second book (A Nefarious Carol).

As of March 2025, A Nefarious Carol is in the production phase. Deace has promised: "We are going to get way more into the spiritual warfare aspect of what was only hinted at in the [first] movie."
