= KKDM =

Radio station in Des Moines, Iowa

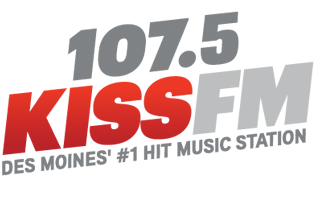
- Des Moines, Iowa; United States
- Broadcast area: Greater Des Moines
- Frequency: 107.5 MHz (HD Radio)
- Branding: 107.5 KISS FM

Programming
- Format: Contemporary Hit Radio; HD2: Sports radio (KXNO simulcast); HD3: Contemporary Christian (K-Love)
- Affiliations: Premiere Networks

Ownership
- Owner: iHeartMedia, Inc.; (iHM Licenses, LLC)
- Sister stations: KDRB, KXNO, KXNO-FM, WHO, KASI, KCYZ

History
- First air date: October 1, 1995
- Former call signs: KACX (1993, CP)
- Call sign meaning: "Kiss Des Moines"

Technical information
- Licensing authority: FCC
- Facility ID: 42108
- Class: C1
- ERP: 100,000 watts
- HAAT: 220 meters (720 ft)
- Transmitter coordinates: 41°38′38.0″N 93°17′20.7″W
- Translators: HD3: 95.3 K237GC (Des Moines); HD3: 97.9 K250BC (Ames); HD3: 103.7 K279BX (Des Moines)

Links
- Public license information: Public file; LMS
- Webcast: Listen live (via iHeartRadio)
- Website: 1075kissfm.iheart.com

KKDM (107.5 MHz) is a commercial radio station licensed to serve Des Moines, Iowa. The station airs an adult-leaning contemporary hit radio format, and is owned by iHeartMedia, Inc. KKDM uses the KISS-FM branding used by many iHeart CHR/Top 40 stations. It carries the Elvis Duran and the Morning Show from co-owned Premiere Networks.

KKDM's studios and offices are located on Grand Avenue in Des Moines. Its transmitter is at South 57th Avenue West and West 124th Street South, near Colfax. KKDM broadcasts in the HD Radio format, Its HD2 subchannel carries a simulcast of KXNO, which airs a sports format. The HD3 subchannel carries the K-Love Christian Contemporary music format from the Educational Media Foundation which is also heard on translator stations 95.3 K237GC in Des Moines, 97.9 K250BC in Ames, and 103.7 K279BX in Des Moines.

== History ==
KKDM was established by local businessman Rich Eychaner as Midwest Radio, Inc. KKDM signed on the air for the first time as modern rock-formatted "107.5 the Dot", on September 20, 1995. Eychanner sold Midwest Radio Inc. to Clear Channel Communications in July 1999. At 6 p.m. on July 2 of that year, Clear Channel swapped KKDM's modern rock format and programming with new sister station KCCQ (which had recently moved to a new frequency and increased power) in exchange for that station's CHR format. KKDM was rebranded as "Kiss 107.5", which later rebranded as "107.5 KISS FM".

== Previous logos ==
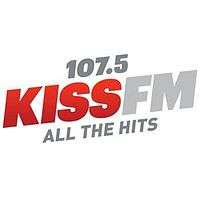

== HD Radio subchannels ==
KKDM operates two HD Radio subchannels on 107.5 - 2 (The Heat) and 107.5 - 3 (K-Love Christian radio) respectively.
