= Plambeck Bulgarian Wind Farm =

Proposed wind farm in Bulgaria

- Country: Bulgaria
- Status: Proposed

Power generation
- Units operational: up to 125
- Nameplate capacity: up to 250 MW

The German wind farm developer Plambeck Neue Energien founded a Bulgarian joint venture in 2007. In October 2009, the planned on having a 100MW wind farm by Kyustendil.

== See also ==
- Kavarna Wind Farm
- Eolica Varna Wind Farm
- Stara Planina Wind Farm
