= KDRB =

Radio station in Des Moines, Iowa

Coordinates: 41.830°N 93.615°W

- Des Moines, Iowa; United States
- Broadcast area: Des Moines metropolitan area
- Frequency: 100.3 MHz (HD Radio)
- Branding: 100.3 The Bus

Programming
- Format: Adult hits
- Subchannels: HD2: WHO simulcast (News/Talk)

Ownership
- Owner: iHeartMedia; (iHM Licenses, LLC)
- Sister stations: KKDM, KXNO, KXNO-FM, WHO, KASI, KCYZ

History
- First air date: 1948; 78 years ago (as WHO-FM)
- Former call signs: WHO-FM (1948–1973); KLYF (1973–1998); KMXD (1998–2006)
- Call sign meaning: Des Moines' R&B; calls carried over from 106.3, though not their associated format, and backronymed, with "RB" now meaning 'radio bus'

Technical information
- Licensing authority: FCC
- Facility ID: 51332
- Class: C
- ERP: 100,000 watts
- HAAT: 547 meters (1,795 ft)

Links
- Public license information: Public file; LMS
- Webcast: Listen Live
- Website: thebusfm.iheart.com

KDRB (100.3 MHz "100.3 The Bus") is a commercial FM radio station in Des Moines, Iowa. It airs an adult hits radio format and is owned by iHeartMedia, carrying its own variety hits format, similar to the franchised Jack FM branding. KDRB is the flagship station for the Iowa State Cyclones.

The station's studios are located at 2141 Grand Avenue in Des Moines along with iHeartMedia's other Des Moines stations, and its transmitter is located on Northwest 2nd Street, near Ankeny Boulevard in Alleman. Broadcasting in HD Radio, its second subchannel carries its mother station WHO (1040), which first signed on what was their formerly similarly-called FM counterpart in 1948.

== History ==
=== WHO-FM ===
In 1948, the station signed on as WHO-FM. It was owned by the Central Broadcasting Company and was the third FM station in Des Moines, after KRNT-FM and KSO-FM. In its early years, it primarily simulcast its sister station, AM 1040 WHO. During the "Golden Age of Radio," WHO-AM-FM carried programming from the NBC Red Network, including comedies, dramas, news, sports, soap operas, game shows and big band broadcasts.

Studios were located at 1100 Walnut Street, and the station's tower and transmitter were located on top of the Equitable Building at 6th and Locust in Des Moines. In 1950, the transmitter was moved to a new tower at WHO's transmitter site in Mitchellville, Iowa. The old transmitter and tower on top of the Equitable Building were sold to KCBC for a new FM station KCBC-FM. In the mid-1960s, WHO-FM ceased simulcasting its AM sister and started programming easy listening and classical music.

=== Switch to KLYF ===
In 1973, the station underwent some dramatic changes. The call letters were changed to KLYF and the station was reprogrammed with a beautiful music format in FM stereo. This was the first time that the station broadcast in multiplex stereo and became known by its nickname "K-Life." As the 1980s approached, KLYF added more vocals to its format to attract younger listeners. On October 31, 1983, KLYF shifted to adult contemporary.

By the mid-1990s, KLYF was a Hot AC station competing directly with KSTZ. The station's transmitter was eventually moved to the WOI Tower near Alleman after their separation from WHO-TV.

=== Ownership changes ===
In December 1996, Palmer Broadcasting sold its Des Moines radio stations to Jacor Broadcasting of Cincinnati, Ohio, with the sale being completed in March 1997. Jacor immediately re-branded KLYF as "Mix 100.3," but left the format unchanged for the most part. It changed the station's calls to KMXD on August 18, 1998 to match its branding. In 1999, Clear Channel Communications (the forerunner to current owner iHeartMedia) bought Jacor, and consolidation with other rivals would bring playlist adjustments and expected listener attrition to remove competition and fine-tune those stations towards specific formats. The station lost its decimal branding post-Christmas 2000 and moved towards a generic '80s and more' format. Eventually it shifted back to its 80's mainstream AC format of the past, becoming "My 100" in March 2005 in concert with the Myspace-driven 'my' naming trend, which was expected to be a long-term shift.

=== The Bus ===
At noon on May 25, 2006, the AC format came to an end, as KMXD was rebranded as "The Bus," simulcasting the adult hits format on 106.3, which at the time carried the KDRB call sign, as part of a two-week transition of that format to Clear Channel's most powerful and heritage Des Moines frequency after 106.3's more variable format proved to be more popular than "My 100".

On June 12, 2006, KMXD adopted the "Bus" format full-time and received the KDRB calls, and has since re-stabilized into one of the area's top-rated stations. The 106.3 frequency would switch to AAA as KPTL, "Capital 106.3".

== Programming ==
100.3 The Bus primarily has no DJs, except Heather Burnside in middays and Maxwell in afternoon drive. However, most of the time, the "Bus Driver" is heard between most songs and commercial breaks, mainly to identify the station. The voice of the "Bus Driver" is national voiceover artist Mark Driscoll.

KDRB has been the flagship station for the Iowa State University Cyclones sports teams since the 2006-2007 season, taking over from sister station AM 1460 KXNO. Its longtime AM sister, WHO, airs the games of the rival University of Iowa.

== Signal ==
KDRB has an effective radiated power of 100,000 watts, the maximum output for non-grandfathered FM stations. It broadcasts from a height above average terrain (HAAT) of 547 meters (1795 feet). That gives it one of the best FM signals in Iowa, allowing it to be heard over much of the state. The station is often heard in the states surrounding Iowa, including into Cedar Rapids, the Quad Cities and Omaha–Council Bluffs depending on reception from car stereos beyond its main signal contour, and the effects of tropospheric propagation.
