= Kavarna Wind Farm =

Proposed wind farm in Bulgaria

- Country: Bulgaria
- Location: Kavarna
- Coordinates: 43°27′00″N 28°28′18″E
- Status: Proposed
- Commission date: 2010
- Owner: AES Corporation

Power generation
- Units operational: 100
- Nameplate capacity: 200 MW

The Kavarna Wind Farm (Bulgarian: Вятърна перка Дроб) is a proposed wind power project in Kavarna, Bulgaria. It will have 100 individual wind turbines with a nominal output of around 2 MW which will deliver up to 200 MW of power, enough to power over 79,800 homes, with a capital investment required of approximately US$450 million.

== See also ==
- Eolica Varna Wind Farm
- Plambeck Bulgarian Wind Farm
