= Simon Conway =

London-born radio show host and public speaker

- Born: 1960 or 1961 (age 65–66); London, England
- Presenting career
- Station: WHO-AM
- Time slot: 4–7pm
- Country: United States
- Website: Simon Conway

Simon Conway is a London-born radio show host and public speaker who hosts a talk show on WHO-AM in Des Moines, Iowa.

== Early life ==
Conway was born in London, England, and raised in nearby Willesden. He became interested in journalism at a young age. Moving to Israel as a teenager, Conway began his professional career as a 16-year-old journalist at The Jerusalem Post in 1976. From the age of 18, back in the U.K., he was "doing shifts" on the Sunday Mirror and News of the World. He went undercover to investigate "the awful Children of God sect" and produced "stuff for Panorama on the National Front".

== Career ==
In the U.K. Conway did radio work on BBC Radio 4 or Radio 5 Live.

He moved to Orlando, Florida, in 2001, entering the real estate business, which Conway discovered was highly competitive. “There are thousands of people selling real estate in Orlando, literally,” he said, which led Conway "to distinguish himself by buying time on the radio." When he got himself a one-hour weekend show he "fell in love with the medium."

== WHO-AM ==
In 2011, Conway took a radio show hosting position at WHO-AM in Des Moines, Iowa.

About 65,000 people across Iowa tuned in to WHO-AM during the afternoon drive time, the largest in Iowa for talk radio.

== Controversy ==
- Conway goaded Ron Paul in 2011 into admitting his noninterventionist foreign policy would have prevented him from executing the raid that killed Osama bin Laden.
- When The Des Moines Register published an interactive map allowing readers to identify schools that did not have security guards in 2013, Conway declared that they had provided "a shopping list for every nut job in Iowa."
- Conway has been an opponent of camera-generating traffic tickets stating in 2014: “The cameras are about money and only money. Cameras have absolutely nothing to do with safety, and the devices actually cause wrecks. If yellow-light times were increased by one second, wrecks at those intersections can be reduced by 50 percent.”
- Following Iowa's move to increase the gas tax by 10 cents a gallon in 2015, Conway urged his listeners to re-register as independents and "ditch the GOP".

== Personal ==
Conway is Jewish and moved to Israel when he was 16. He has two daughters. He is a naturalized American citizen.

After suffering two heart attacks during one week in 2017, Conway quit smoking and returned to the broadcast booth.
