= KCIM =

Coordinates: 42°02′29″N 94°53′06″W

- Carroll, Iowa; United States
- Frequency: 1380 kHz
- Branding: 1380 KCIM

Programming
- Format: Classic hits
- Affiliations: Townhall News

Ownership
- Owner: Carroll Broadcasting Company

History
- First air date: November 2, 1950

Technical information
- Licensing authority: FCC
- Facility ID: 9109
- Class: D
- Power: 500 watts day 28 watts night
- Translator: 95.1 K236CV (Carroll)

Links
- Public license information: Public file; LMS
- Webcast: Listen Live
- Website: 1380kcim.com

KCIM (1380 AM, "1380 KCIM") is a radio station based in Carroll, Iowa. The station plays classic hits music, along with providing news, sports and farm information. KCIM is part of the Carroll Broadcasting Company, along with KKRL, and KIKD. It was first licensed on November 2, 1950. Correct coordinates are 42° 02' 16"N, 94° 53' 04"W. The information lodged with Cavell Mertz gave the correct details.

== History ==
KCIM-AM signed on July 27, 1950 at 5:00 PM with 14 full-time employees under the ownership of Carroll Broadcasting, owners of KCIM, KKRL along with local cable channel CBTV. At the time, KCIM was the first radio station owned by Carroll Broadcasting. The station in 1951 became a member of the Liberty Broadcasting system and featured Liberty's baseball game of the day. In 1953, 1954 KCIM aired White Sox baseball games from WCFL. In 1951 and 1952 they aired Carroll Merchant baseball games. On April 6, 1954, KCIM was granted a pattern change to extend their coverage west of Denison, south of Audubon and east of Jefferson. KCIM-AM was a news station dedicated to news from around the Carroll County Area. KCIM-AM went through a few format changes: first it was a country station, then after the purchase of KIKD it changed to an easy listening format, after a while it switched to classic hits/oldies.

== Announcers and programming ==
KCIM's morning announcer and Program Director is John Ryan. Other current announcers (as of September 2022) include Nathan Konz as News Director, Sports Director/middays Jeff Blankman, Farm News Director Von Kettelsen. KCIM has also been the home for Iowa State sports, and Cubs Baseball.
