= Jim Zabel =

American broadcaster

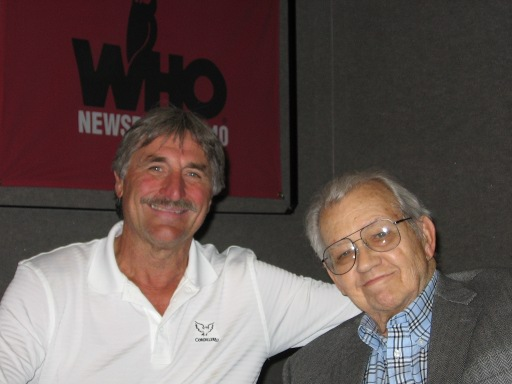
- Ed Podolak (left) and Zabel at the WHO-radio studios in Des Moines, Iowa, September 2009
- Born: James Zabel; September 3, 1921; Davenport, Iowa, U.S.
- Died: May 23, 2013 (aged 91); Scottsdale, Arizona, U.S.
- Occupation: Sports broadcaster
- Years active: 1944–2013
- Spouse: Mary Janice Boehm

Jim Zabel (September 5, 1921 – May 23, 2013) was an American radio and television broadcaster best known for serving as the play-by-play announcer for Iowa Hawkeyes football and men's basketball games for 48 years on WHO (AM) Radio. A native of Davenport, Iowa, Zabel attended The University of Iowa, where he was an editor of the student newspaper, graduating with a degree in journalism in 1944. Zabel joined WHO as the sports director in 1944, He was employed by the station as a talk-show host after retiring from play-by-play.

Zabel worked for WHO-AM and its sister television station, WHO-TV, as both a sports broadcaster and as a host of general-interest programs. His television shows included Beat the Bear, which lasted for 25 years, and Let's Go Bowling, which lasted for more than 30 years.

Zabel was a live presence for a half-century of sporting events in Iowa, including the Drake Relays, for which he provided radio commentary for many years. It has been estimated that he provided commentary for more than 6,100 sporting events. He was named to the Iowa Sports Hall of Fame in 2007. In 1997, Zabel was succeeded by Gary Dolphin as the play-by-play announcer for network broadcasts of Iowa Hawkeyes football and men's basketball games.

Zabel died on May 23, 2013, at the age of 91 doing what he loved, preparing for his Sunday evening WHO-radio show, Two Guys Named Jim at his home in Arizona.
