= KKSO (AM) =

Radio station in Des Moines, Iowa

- Des Moines, Iowa; United States
- Broadcast area: Des Moines metropolitan area
- Frequency: 1390 kHz

Ownership
- Owner: Barnstable Broadcasting, Inc.; (Two Rivers Broadcasting Limited Partnership)

History
- First air date: 1947 (as KCBC)
- Last air date: 2001
- Former call signs: KCBC (1947–1983); KMRY (1983–1990)

Technical information
- Facility ID: 22888
- Class: B
- Power: 1,000 watts

KKSO (1390 kHz) was a commercial AM radio station in Des Moines, Iowa. The station was owned by Barnstable Broadcasting, and was supplanted by its expanded band successor, KBGG 1700 AM, in 2001.

== History ==
KKSO signed on in 1947 as KCBC. The station was owned by Capital City Broadcasting Company and was a network affiliate of the Mutual Broadcasting System. KCBC broadcast on 1390 kHz with a 1,000 watt directional antenna day and night.

In 1949, an FM station was launched on 94.1 MHz, as KCBC-FM. That station went off the air in 1953, and the license was deleted by the Federal Communications Commission (FCC).

In 1983, KCBC became KMRY. On September 26, 1988, KMRY dropped its big band format and began simulcasting the country music of co-owned KJJY. In 1990, it became KKSO (in reference to the heritage KSO call sign vacated the prior year).

On April 25, 1995, KKSO became an affiliate of Radio AAHS. Upon the dissolution of Radio AAHS in January 1998, KKSO went silent. In April 1998, KKSO returned to the air with a business news/talk format.

=== Expanded Band assignment and deletion ===
On March 17, 1997, the Federal Communications Commission (FCC) announced that eighty-eight stations had been given permission to move to newly available "Expanded Band" transmitting frequencies, ranging from 1610 to 1700 kHz, with KKSO authorized to move from 1390 to 1700 kHz.

A construction permit for the expanded band station was assigned the call letters KBGG on November 12, 1997. The FCC's initial policy was that both the original station and its expanded band counterpart could operate simultaneously for up to five years, after which owners would have to turn in one of the two licenses, depending on whether they preferred the new assignment or elected to remain on the original frequency. Upon the sign-on of KBGG in July 1998, the business news/talk format would move to the new station and KKSO again left the air. While KKSO returned to the air in July 2000 with a simulcast of KBGG, which by then had switched to CNN Headline News, it was ultimately decided to transfer full operations to the expanded band station. On February 2, 2001, the license for KKSO was cancelled. KBGG would itself cease operations in 2025 and surrender its license in 2026.

In July 2024, the FCC granted the KKSO call letters to an Iowa Public Radio (IPR) outlet in the Des Moines metro on 88.9, effective August 30, 2024. This station carries IPR's "Studio One" service and is not related to the earlier KKSO or KSO.
