= KKRL =

Coordinates: 42.049°N 94.884°W

- Carroll, Iowa; United States
- Frequency: 93.7 MHz
- Branding: 93.7 KKRL

Programming
- Format: Hot adult contemporary
- Affiliations: Premiere Networks

Ownership
- Owner: Carroll Broadcasting Company

History
- First air date: January 18, 1967 (as KCIM)
- Former call signs: KCIM (1967–1980); KKRK (1/1980-4/1980)

Technical information
- Facility ID: 9115
- Class: C1
- ERP: 100,000 watts
- HAAT: 84 meters

Links
- Webcast: Stream Live
- Website: 937kkrl.com

KKRL (93.7 FM, "93.7 KKRL") is an FM radio station based in Carroll, Iowa. The station airs a hot adult contemporary format. KKRL is part of Carroll Broadcasting Company, along with KIKD, and KCIM.

== History ==
KKRL-FM signed on in 1967 under the ownership of the Carroll Broadcasting, owners of KCIM, and KIKD. At the time, KKRL was the first FM radio station owned by Carroll Broadcasting. KKRL was an automated station playing all 70's at night but later added local personalities in the overnight hours. Later they played rock n' roll hits, then switched formats to Hot-AC.

== Personalities and programming ==
KKRL's current morning announcer is Renie Osterlund. Other personalities (as of July 2020) include Lance Coon, Kristen Campisi, and Tyler Brunner, with news and sports by Jeff Blankman and Nathan Konz.
