= KGVC-LP =

Radio station at Grand View University in Des Moines, Iowa (2007–2015)

Des Moines, Iowa; United States
- Broadcast area: Grand View University
- Frequency: 94.1 MHz
- Branding: Flashback 94

Programming
- Format: Defunct

Ownership
- Owner: Grand View University; (Grand View College)

History
- First air date: 2007; 19 years ago
- Last air date: 2015; 11 years ago
- Call sign meaning: Grand View College

Technical information
- Licensing authority: FCC
- Facility ID: 133227
- Class: L1
- ERP: 100 watts
- HAAT: 23.7 meters (78 ft)
- Transmitter coordinates: 41°37′12″N 93°36′6″W

Links
- Public license information: LMS

KGVC-LP (94.1 FM, "Flashback 94") was a radio station licensed to Des Moines, Iowa, United States, and serving the Grand View University area. The station was owned by Grand View University. Prior to its 2007 launch, Grand View College students broadcast by leasing time over KDPS (88.1 FM).

The university surrendered KGVC-LP's license to the Federal Communications Commission (FCC) on March 13, 2015; the FCC cancelled the license the same day. KGVC-LP's leaving the air allowed KDRA-LP to go full-time on 94.1 FM; KDRA-LP itself shut down in 2019.
