= Joachim Plambeck House =

Historic house in Iowa, United States

- U.S. National Register of Historic Places
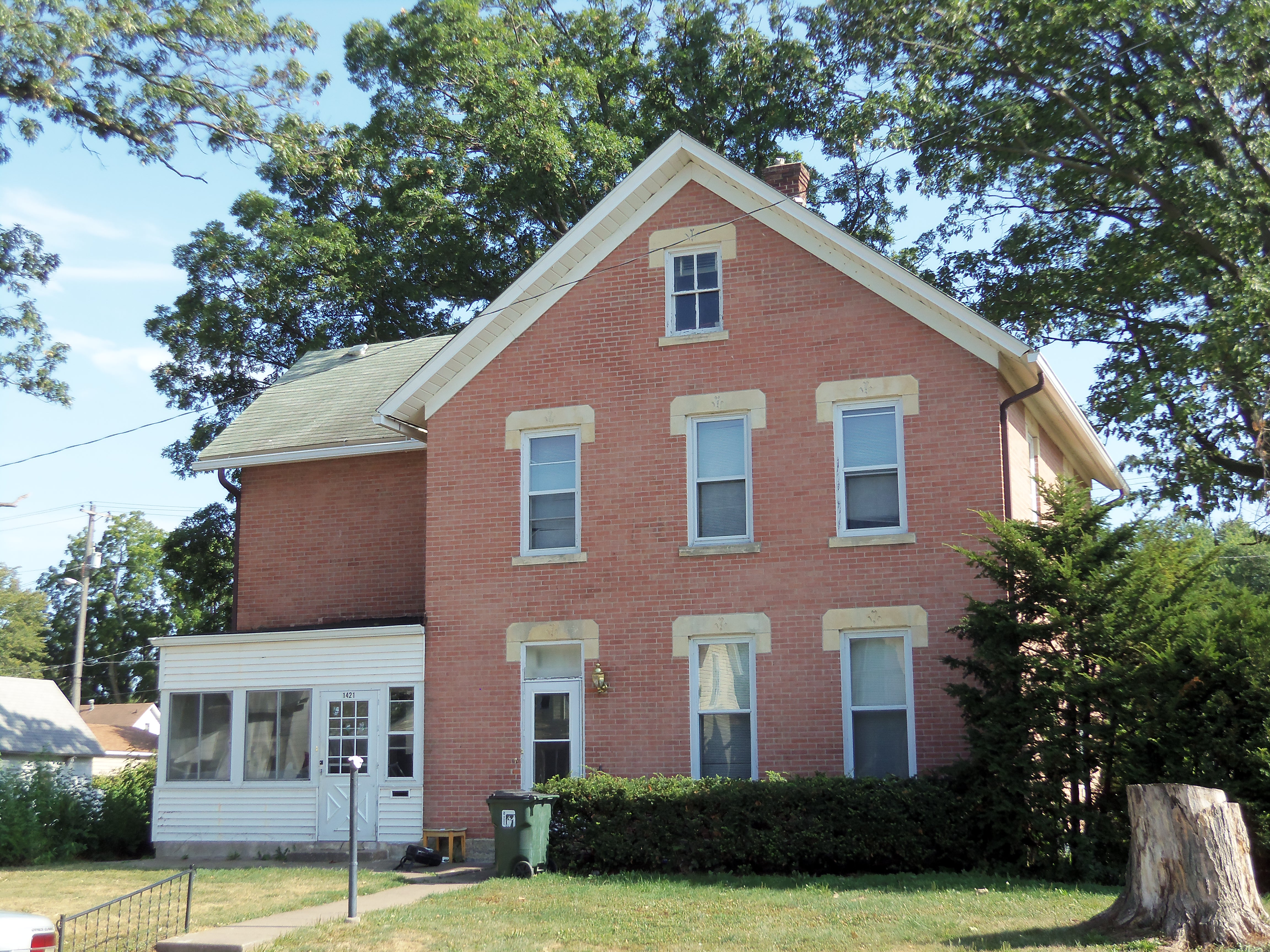

- Location within Iowa Location within the United States
- Location: 1421 W. 14th St. Davenport, Iowa
- Coordinates: 41°32′0.8″N 90°35′41.44″W
- Area: less than one acre
- Built: 1888
- Architectural style: Late Victorian
- MPS: Davenport MRA
- NRHP reference No.: 84001516
- Added to NRHP: July 27, 1984

The Joachim Plambeck House is a historic building located in the West End of Davenport, Iowa, United States. It and the neighboring Claus Untiedt House are replicas of each other, although the Plambeck House has more alterations. The 2-story Late Victorian style residence features a three-bay façade with a side entrance and a front gable. An enclosed porch was added in the re-entrant angle. Stone hoods that sit flush with the exterior wall decorate the tops of the rectangular windows. The light pink brick structure rests on a stone foundation that has subsequently been covered with cement. Joachim Plambeck, who was the first occupant of this house, was a German immigrant and worked as a woodworker. The house has been listed on the National Register of Historic Places since 1984.
