= KXNO-FM =

Radio station in Ankeny, Iowa

Coordinates: 41.679°N 93.596°W

Simulcast of KXNO (AM) Des Moines
- Ankeny, Iowa; United States
- Broadcast area: Des Moines metropolitan area
- Frequency: 106.3 MHz (HD Radio)
- Branding: 106.3 / 1460 KXnO

Programming
- Format: Sports radio
- Subchannels: HD2: Country "96.9 The Bull"
- Affiliations: Fox Sports Radio; Iowa Wild; Iowa Wolves

Ownership
- Owner: iHeartMedia; (iHM Licenses, LLC)
- Sister stations: KDRB; KKDM; KXNO; WHO; KASI; KCYZ

History
- First air date: July 1, 1991 (as KMXD)
- Former call signs: KMXD (1991–1998); KYSY (1998–1999); KLYF (1999–2001); KVJZ (2001–2003); KDRB (2003–2006); KPTL (2006–2014); KDXA (2014–2020)
- Call sign meaning: From sister AM station, meaning "X's and O's", which are commonly used to denote the defense and offense in a football playbook

Technical information
- Licensing authority: FCC
- Facility ID: 69635
- Class: C3
- ERP: 25,000 watts
- HAAT: 100 meters (330 ft)
- Translator: HD2: 96.9 K245CO (Millman)

Links
- Public license information: Public file; LMS
- Webcast: Listen live (via iHeartRadio); Listen live (via iHeartRadio)
- Website: kxno.iheart.com; 969thebullfm.iheart.com (HD2)

KXNO-FM (106.3 MHz, "106.3 / 1460 KXnO") is a commercial radio station licensed to Ankeny, Iowa, and serving the Des Moines radio market. It airs a sports radio format and is owned by iHeartMedia. The station's studios are located on Grand Avenue in Des Moines, and its transmitter is located on Northeast 66th Avenue in Ankeny.

KXNO-FM broadcasts in the HD Radio format. Its HD-2 subchannel airs country music, also heard on translator station 96.9 K245CO in Millman, using the moniker "96.9 The Bull".

== History ==
=== KANY and KJJY ===
The first station to occupy the 106.3 frequency was KANY, which signed on the air on February 4, 1978 with 3,000 watts of power. The station had a format of easy listening and middle of the road music, focusing on Ankeny. On May 2, 1981, the station was sold by the Ankeny Broadcasting company to Fuller-Jeffrey Broadcasting. After Fuller-Jeffrey acquired the station, the call letters were changed to KJJY and the format to country.

As KJJY, the station slowly built a following taking on the market's current country giant KSO, which had been the market's country leader on the AM band since 1972. KJJY also fended off a challenge from KKXI in 1986, asserting its dominance in the FM country market. To better compete in the market, KJJY moved to 92.5 MHz on July 1, 1988, and received a power upgrade to 50,000 watts. The 106.3 frequency would go dark at this time.

=== KMXD, KYSY and KVJZ ===
On July 1, 1991, 106.3 signed back on as KMXD. This incarnation was owned by Van Oort Communications, and was programmed with a beautiful music/easy listening format. The station was not a huge success, but it maintained a loyal following of listeners. On June 1, 1998, KMXD was acquired by Clear Channel Communications (now iHeartMedia); upon acquiring KMXD, the call letters were moved to its new sister station KLYF, which was known at the time as "Mix 100". The 106.3 frequency received the new call letters KYSY, rebranded as "Sunny 106", and was reprogrammed as an adult contemporary music station.

"Sunny 106" was never a top performer in the market, usually behind main rival KLTI. On October 1, 1999, the call sign changed to KLYF while keeping the adult contemporary format. The thought was to bring back a historic name to the market in hopes of turning around the station's fortunes. In the two years that the station was KLYF, it did quite a bit better than KYSY, but still never lived up to expectations.

After the failure of two AC-formatted stations, Clear Channel decided to go in a totally different direction; at 9 a.m. on August 30, 2001, a new smooth jazz format debuted, marking the first such station in the market. The new call letters were KVJZ and the station was known as "Smooth Jazz, V106.3". Much like when the station was KMXD, this format never attracted huge numbers, but had a loyal following.

=== The Beat and The Bus ===
On October 1, 2003, at midnight, the format was changed once again to rhythmic contemporary and the station became known as KDRB, 106.3 The Beat. Although it was the most successful format on the 106.3 frequency since KJJY, it largely cannibalized the audience of sister Mainstream CHR station KKDM rather than attracting new listeners away from competitors.

On April 1, 2005, after a brief stunt with a loop of Weird Al Yankovic's "Another One Rides the Bus", the station flipped to adult hits as 106.3 The Bus. The Bus did moderately well, picking up a very loyal fanbase while also maintaining decent ratings. On May 25, 2006, at noon, sister station KMXD started simulcasting The Bus. For a few weeks, they became known as 100.3 and 106.3 The Bus. This arrangement was short-lived, and at noon on June 12, 2006, the KDRB calls and The Bus format moved completely to 100.3, replacing KMXD.

=== Capital and Alt ===
On June 12, 2006, the station re-launched as adult album alternative (AAA) Capital 106.3, and adopted the calls KPTL. The flip marked the first AAA station in Des Moines since the demise of KFMG in 1996 (KFMG was resurrected on a low-power FM station at 98.9 FM that signed on February 26, 2007; it also has an AAA format).

By 2011, KPTL shifted its direction from AAA to modern adult contemporary, in an effort to compete with hot AC rival KSTZ. This move resulted in KPTL being moved from Mediabase's AAA panel to the Adult Top 40 panel. By 2012, KPTL shifted towards a mainstream Hot AC direction, competing against KSTZ.

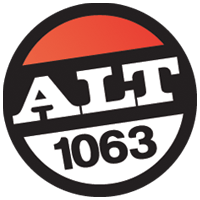
Former logo as Alt 106.3, used until 2017; the subsequent logo was similar, but included the dot in 106.3, and featured the station's slogan, "Des Moines' Rock Alternative", in a subcircle underneath.

On November 1, 2013, the station did an early conversion to a Christmas music format for the remainder of the year as Capital Christmas 106.3. Following the holiday, it swapped formats with co-owned alternative rock station KCCQ and became Alt 106.3. On April 4, 2014, KPTL changed its call letters to KDXA.

=== KXNO-FM ===
On January 16, 2020, it was announced that sports talk sister station KXNO would add an FM simulcast on KDXA. The station had dismissed its morning and afternoon hosts, as well as several other staff members, as part of national layoffs by iHeartMedia resulting from corporate restructuring. After criticism of the move by listeners, the company reversed course. KDXA began simulcasting KXNO on January 21. The call sign was changed to KXNO-FM on April 1, 2020.

In June 2026, the station again lost its local programs, as all hosts were laid off as part of nationwide downsizing by iHeartMedia.
