= KCYZ =

- Ames, Iowa; United States
- Broadcast area: Des Moines metropolitan area
- Frequency: 105.1 MHz
- Branding: Now 105.1

Programming
- Format: Hot AC
- Affiliations: Premiere Networks

Ownership
- Owner: iHeartMedia, Inc.; (iHM Licenses, LLC)
- Sister stations: KASI, KDRB, KKDM, KXNO, KXNO-FM, WHO

History
- First air date: June 20, 1968
- Former call signs: KCCQ (1968–2014)

Technical information
- Facility ID: 2115
- Class: C3
- ERP: 25,000 watts
- HAAT: 100 meters (330 ft)
- Transmitter coordinates: 42°04′38″N 93°38′54″W

Links
- Webcast: Listen live (via iHeartRadio)
- Website: now1051.iheart.com

KCYZ (105.1 FM) is a commercial radio station licensed to Ames, Iowa, United States, broadcasting to the Des Moines metropolitan area. KCYZ airs a hot adult contemporary format branded as "Now 105.1". KCYZ is owned by iHeartMedia with the license held by Citicaster Licenses LP. The studios are on Main Street in Ames. KCYZ is Ames' FM home for Iowa State Cyclones college football and men's basketball, simulcasting with KASI.

The transmitter is on West 190th Street near Hyde Avenue, north of Downtown Ames.

== History ==
The station signed on the air on June 20, 1968. The original call sign was KCCQ and it broadcast on 107.1 MHz. It was owned by the Ames Broadcasting Company. KCCQ was the sister station of KASI (1430 AM). At the time, KCCQ was only powered at 3,000 watts. It was known as "Hot 107 KCCQ" and "107 KCCQ, Ames' Hot FM". Ames Broadcasting also owned KIKD-FM in Lake City. The company was owned by a woman, a rare event in that era. Betty Baudler Horras started as a bookkeeper before moving up to station management.

When it started life on June 20, 1968, KCCQ was one of two Top 40 stations broadcasting in Central Iowa, including the Des Moines radio market. When the early 1980s rolled along, the station faced Top 40 competition against KRNQ, KIOA-AM, and KMGK (later KDWZ). Unfortunately, KCCQ's signal in Des Moines itself was relatively weak. When the station was at 107.1 FM, listeners in Des Moines and other parts of the southern fringe of KCCQ's coverage area could often hear interference from KJJC in Osceola, which was broadcasting at 106.9 FM with higher wattage than KCCQ.

In 1998, the station changed frequencies to 105.1 FM, and the power was increased to its current 25,000 watt output. That improved the signal, though it still only provides grade B coverage to Des Moines itself. With its improved signal, in 1999, KCCQ and KASI were sold to Jacor, which later merged with Clear Channel Communications, the forerunner to today's iHeartMedia.

After the purchase by Clear Channel, the company swapped KCCQ's CHR format with the alternative rock format of its then-new sister station KKDM. KCCQ was then known as "Channel Q". In August 2010, KCCQ rebranded as "New Rock 105.1".

On December 26, 2013, at midnight, KCCQ swapped formats with sister station KPTL and began broadcasting a Hot AC format, while its alternative rock format moved to 106.3. On April 4, 2014, KCCQ changed its call letters to KCYZ. Clear Channel also changed its name to iHeartMedia on September 16, 2014.
