= KDRA-LP =

Radio station at Drake University in Des Moines, Iowa

Des Moines, Iowa; United States
- Frequency: 94.1 MHz
- Branding: The Dog

Programming
- Format: Defunct (was college radio)

Ownership
- Owner: Drake University

History
- First air date: August 22, 2006; 19 years ago
- Last air date: August 15, 2019; 6 years ago

Technical information
- Facility ID: 132964
- Class: L1
- ERP: 80 watts
- HAAT: 33.4 meters (110 ft)
- Transmitter coordinates: 41°36′8″N 93°39′20″W

KDRA-LP (94.1 FM) was a radio station licensed to Des Moines, Iowa, United States and adopted the nickname "The Dog" on August 22, 2006. The station was owned by Drake University.

== History ==
Drake first began radio operations in 1982, with carrier current station "KDRK". From 2000 to 2006, it broadcast online and on campus TV sets as "KDCS Bulldog Radio". Until 2015, it was a time-shared station with KGVC-LP of Grand View College, later Grand View University; when the license for KGVC-LP was surrendered, it allowed KDRA-LP to go full-time on 94.1. On June 10, 2019, Drake University notified the FCC that KDRA-LP would cease operations on or before August 15, 2019, and that it would be surrendering the station's license. Its license was cancelled on January 5, 2021.
