= KASI =

Radio station in Ames, Iowa

- Ames, Iowa; United States
- Broadcast area: Des Moines metropolitan area
- Frequency: 1430 kHz
- Branding: KASI News Talk 1430

Programming
- Format: Talk radio
- Affiliations: Bloomberg Radio; Compass Media Networks; Fox News Radio; Premiere Networks; Westwood One; Iowa State Cyclones Sports

Ownership
- Owner: iHeartMedia, Inc.; (iHM Licenses, LLC)
- Sister stations: KCYZ, KDRB, KKDM, KXNO, KXNO-FM, WHO

History
- First air date: October 1948; 77 years ago
- Call sign meaning: Ames Iowa

Technical information
- Licensing authority: FCC
- Facility ID: 2116
- Class: D
- Power: 1,000 watts (day); 32 watts (night)
- Transmitter coordinates: 42°2′18″N 93°40′53″W

Links
- Public license information: Public file; LMS
- Webcast: Listen live (via iHeartRadio)
- Website: 1430kasi.iheart.com

KASI (1430 kHz, "News Talk 1430") is a commercial radio station in Ames, Iowa, broadcasting a talk radio format. The station is owned by iHeartMedia, Inc. Its studios and offices are on Main Street in Ames.

By day, KASI is powered at 1,000 watts non-directional. To avoid interference at night to other stations on 1430 AM, KASI reduces power to 32 watts. The station's transmitter is on Martin Street off North Dakota Avenue in Ames. According to the Antenna Structure Registration database, the tower is 124.4 meters (408 ft) tall.

== Programming ==
The schedule is nationally syndicated talk hosts. Because iHeart also owns another talk station heard in Ames, 50,000-watt WHO 1040 Des Moines, KASI avoids duplicating WHO's programming. Syndicated weekday programs include Armstrong & Getty, The Ramsey Show with Dave Ramsey, The Jesse Kelly Show, Red Eye Radio, America in the Morning and Markley, Van Camp & Robbins.

Syndicated programs on weekends include At Home with Gary Sullivan, Rich DeMuro on Tech, Bill Handel on the Law, The Pet Show with Warren Eckstein, America at Night with Rich Valdes, Big Billy Kinder Outdoors and repeats of weekday shows. Most hours begin with an update from Fox News Radio. KASI and sister station KCYZ 105.1 FM carry Iowa State Cyclones college football and men's basketball games.

== History ==
KASI signed on the air in October 1948. The station was assigned the KASI call letters by the Federal Communications Commission. It was originally a daytimer, required to go off the air at night. The owner was the Ames Broadcasting Company with studios at 328 1/2 Main Street.

Ames Broadcasting also applied for an FM construction permit to put a station on the air at 95.5 MHz. The company proposed that it would have a power of 45,000 watts, however KASI-FM was never built. In 1968, Ames Broadcasting put an FM station on the air, KCCQ on 107.1 MHz. It had an automated top 40 format.
