= Stara Planina Wind Farm =

Proposed wind farm in Varna, Bulgaria

- Country: Bulgaria
- Location: Stara Planina
- Status: Proposed
- Owner: Greentech

Power generation
- Units operational: 30
- Nameplate capacity: 60 MW

The Stara Planina Wind Farm (Bulgarian: Вятърна перка Дроб) is a proposed wind power project in Varna, Bulgaria. It will have 30 individual wind turbines with a nominal output of around 2 MW each that will deliver up to 60 MW of power, enough to power over 23,940 homes, with a capital investment required of approximately US$120 million.
