= Pinky Swear Foundation =

U.S.-based nonprofit organization

- Formation: 2003; 23 years ago
- Founder: Steve Chepokas
- Type: Non-profit organization
- Tax ID no.: 56-2384527
- Legal status: 501(c)(3)
- Headquarters: Edina, Minnesota, U.S.
- Region served: United States
- Website: pinkyswear.org

Pinky Swear Foundation is a U.S.-based nonprofit organization that provides financial assistance to families of children with cancer. Based in Edina, Minnesota, the organization helps cover non-medical expenses such as housing, food, and transportation during pediatric cancer treatment.

== History ==
Pinky Swear Foundation was founded in 2003, inspired by the story of Mitch Chepokas, a 9-year-old boy diagnosed with terminal bone cancer. Just before his death, Mitch gave away his savings to other young cancer patients, signing notes "Love, Mitch. XOXOXO," and made his father, Steve Chepokas, pinky swear to continue helping families facing similar struggles. This promise led to the creation of the foundation.

== Programs ==
Pinky Swear Foundation provides various support programs for families navigating Childhood cancer, including financial grants for essential expenses and food pantries located in children's hospitals. As of 2026, the foundation has partnerships with 200 hospitals in 50 states. Families that need more assistance can apply for the "All Star" program, where money goes towards mortgage or rent payments as well as other essential bills.

== Events ==
The foundation hosts fundraising events including an annual Radiothon and the Pinky Swear Kids Triathlon. The Radiothon raises hundreds of thousands of dollars annually and includes personal stories from families supported by the organization.

== Recognition ==
Pinky Swear Foundation has been recognized by various news outlets for its continued support of pediatric cancer families. It was named a major nonprofit partner by Love Your Melon.
