= KDPS =

Radio station in Des Moines, Iowa

Coordinates: 41°35′1″N 93°38′28″W

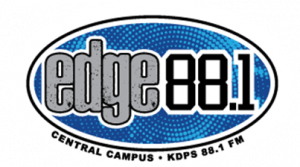
- Des Moines, Iowa; United States
- Broadcast area: Des Moines, Iowa area
- Frequency: 88.1 MHz
- Branding: Edge 88.1

Programming
- Format: Variety

Ownership
- Owner: Des Moines Public Schools, programmed in part by Grand View University; (Des Moines Independent School District)

History
- First air date: 1953
- Last air date: June 2025
- Former call signs: DKDPS (2005-?)
- Call sign meaning: Des Moines Public Schools

Technical information
- Licensing authority: FCC
- Facility ID: 16720
- Class: A
- ERP: 5,200 watts
- HAAT: 87.0 meters

Links
- Public license information: Public file; LMS
- Webcast: Listen Live
- Website: KDPS Website

KDPS was a radio station in Des Moines, Iowa. The station was owned by Des Moines Public Schools. The school district used to program the station with a variety of rock music styles and staffed it with high school students who were learning radio. For its last 45 years, evenings and weekends were filled by Grand View University programming from college students on weekdays and Kids Radio Mania pre-teen music on weekends, holidays and some summers.

Note that the blue logo shown for "Edge 88.1" combines the old Grand View University bumper sticker "Edge 88" logo with the newer Central Campus high school KDPS design. Search online for examples of the real past logos from both sides of the station.

== History before 2000 ==
The Des Moines Public Schools started broadcasting on KDPS in 1953. In recent decades KDPS broadcast from Central Campus High School, mostly playing a mix of Top 40, Rock, Hip-Hop and Dance with high school students practicing announcing skills, along with other educational programs. An all-request show, mix show and other variety programming could be heard on the station throughout the week.

It just broadcast during portions of weekdays until the early 1980s, when Grand View College (now University) started leasing airtime from the high school to allow college students to broadcast during unused portions of the day from the studios of the Grand View campus in Des Moines. In 1989 Grand View started expanding its time on the station to the point where by the early 2000s it was programming almost 50% of the weekdays (evenings and overnights), as well as programming automated pre-teen Kids Radio Mania all of the weekends, holidays, and summers when the high school students were not on the air.

The station was sold in 2025 after 72 years of broadcasting.

== Kids Radio Mania children's programming ==
Kids Radio Mania was the station's weekend radio programming format that continues online with YouTube specials. Kids Radio Mania is produced by Professor Stephen Winzenburg, who oversaw the radio program at Grand View University for almost 30 years. From 2001-2025 Kids Radio Mania aired weekends and holidays throughout the year on KDPS when the Des Moines Public Schools owned the station. Since 2025 Kids Radio Mania regularly posts new content for children on YouTube @KidsRadioMania.

Kids Radio Mania started in 1992 as a four-hour Saturday morning kids music format. Originally produced on large one-hour reel-to-reel tapes, the format used the little amount of children's music that was available at the time. The Saturday morning format lasted for three years, until a national children's radio format from Disney came to the Des Moines market on an AM station (which only lasted for a year).

The Kids Radio Mania format was revived as an all-weekend station format on KDPS on the weekend of March 31 and April 1, 2001. From a small collection of children's CDs the station grew to a library of over 600 CDs and airs pre-teen pop music, such as Miley Cyrus as Hannah Montana, Hilary Duff, Aaron Carter, Raven, the A-Teens and Jesse McCartney. It also has played many of the kids classics, such as Raffi, Barney, Mary-Kate and Ashley Olsen and Hampton the Hampster.

Shortly after the all-weekend format was started, the station was approached by local public television host Dan Wardell to start a weekly live children's call-in show. Crazy Dave's Kid Show started the first weekend of August in 2001 and aired every Saturday morning at 10:30 for ten years. The show received calls from all over the world, including Sweden, Australia, New Jersey, New York, Oregon and California. Some of the edited Crazy Dave talk show recordings are available on YouTube at the Kids Radio Mania page.

In 2006 KDPS started awarding the annual "Family Favorite Awards," given to children's recording artists for best album, best singer, best song and best album packaging.

Unlike the few commercial children's radio stations in the United States, Kids Radio Mania was unique non-commercial venture that did not air any inappropriate pop music. The station also did not focus on simplistic guitar-and-vocalist folk songs but offered a wide variety of upbeat music material that the entire family could enjoy. Each week about 30 songs were on the station's "hot" list of tunes played every three to four hours. Another 120 songs were mixed in throughout the weekend and a featured artist was played hourly in the rotation.

Educational segments on Kids Radio Mania included hourly segments from past Crazy Dave's Kid Show, weekly historical information, "The Thesaurus Forest," "The Name Hall of Fame," "Animal Adventures," "The State of the Week," "The Birthday Buddy" and "The Presidential Profile."

When KDPS was sold in 2025, Kids Radio Mania was in the midst of celebrating its 25th year of all-weekend broadcasts. It has continually posted new shows on its YouTube page @KidsRadioMania. Some edited Crazy Dave talk shows are available on the YouTube page as well as Spotify and other major streaming services.

Kids Radio Mania is a registered servicemark of Stephen Winzenburg and Grand View University.

== End of ownership and new listening options ==
In June of 2025 Des Moines Public Schools was given permission by the FCC to go silent as it attempted to sell the station. It continued to stream automated pre-recorded music on weekdays and Kids Radio Mania on weekends. It did not return to the broadcast airwaves.

On September 2nd, 2025, the Des Moines Public School Board voted to sell KDPS to Community Broadcasting, Inc better known as Bott Radio Network, for $175,000.

Since then the Central Campus High School students of the Des Moines Public Schools now broadcast via a programming stream at KDPScentral.streamon.fm.

Old DJ shows, news and sports recordings from the Grand View history of KDPS are available on YouTube @SWinzenburg in the "KDPS & Grand View University Radio" playlist. There is an active Facebook page that notifies about new archive posts @KDPSradio.

Kids Radio Mania continues to air as a pre-produced show on YouTube @KidsRadioMania. It has music specials, talk shows, children's stories, and short humorous videos.

== See also ==
- KCBC-FM (defunct) (KDPS's predecessor)
