= Herb Plambeck =

- Born: Herbert Plambeck; February 29, 1908
- Died: January 15, 2001 (aged 92)
- Occupation: Agriculture

Herbert Plambeck (February 29, 1908 – January 15, 2001) was an American farm reporter, agriculture public affairs assistant, and founder of the Iowa Master Swine Producers awards. Plambeck won over 80 honors and wrote multiple publications. An award was named after him.

== Life and career ==
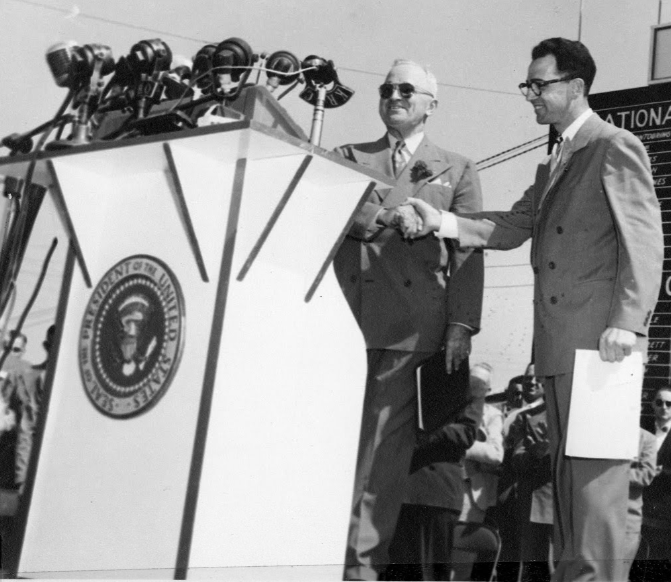
President Harry S. Truman shaking Herb Plambeck's hand at the National Plowing Match

Plambeck was born on February 29, 1908, and lived in Scott County, Iowa, during his childhood. He started as a United States Department of Agriculture College County Extension employee and became the Davenport Times-Democrat's Farm Editor in 1935. In 1936, Plambeck graduated with a major in agriculture from Iowa State University and became the Farm Director for the Des Moines, Iowa, radio station WHO. Plambeck broadcast the first radio farm report from Russia as a part of the U.S. Agricultural Delegation to the Soviet Union in 1955. He left WHO radio in 1970 to become the assistant of the United States Secretary of Agriculture, in which he dealt with public affairs. In 1976, Plambeck broadcast the first radio farm report from China. He was the founder of the National Plowing Match in Dexter, Iowa. He was part of the National Agricultural Center and Hall of Fame Board of Directors. Plambeck died on January 15, 2001.

== Awards ==
Plambeck won over 80 honors from state-level to international-level such as the Herbert Hoover Citizenship Award, the National Soil Conservation Award, and the Alfred I. duPont–Columbia University Award. Plambeck was a founder of the Iowa Master Swine Producers awards during World War II to award some of Iowa's most efficient pork producers. The Plambeck Award from the National Association of Farm Broadcasting was named after him.

== Publications ==
Plambeck wrote books and booklets such as Iowa’s Heritage of Pioneer Family Farms and "This Is Herb" with Never a Dull Moment. Elaine H. Edwards wrote a review in the Annals of Iowa for This Is Herb saying, "Whatever the case, the book provides a glimpse of Iowa's rich agricultural history. For historians, the book provides a starting place for finding out little nuggets of information on Iowans."
