= KXNO (AM) =

Coordinates: 41°38′45″N 93°32′12″W

- Des Moines, Iowa; United States
- Broadcast area: Des Moines metropolitan area
- Frequency: 1460 kHz
- Branding: 106.3 / 1460 KXnO

Programming
- Language: English
- Format: Sports radio
- Affiliations: Fox Sports Radio; Iowa Wild; Iowa Wolves

Ownership
- Owner: iHeartMedia; (iHM Licenses, LLC)
- Sister stations: KDRB; KKDM; KXNO-FM; WHO; KASI; KCYZ

History
- First air date: July 29, 1922 (in Cedar Rapids, moved to Des Moines in 1935)
- Former call signs: WKAA (1922–1925); KWCR (1925–1935); KSO (1935–1989); KGGO (1989–1994); KDMI (1994–2001)
- Call sign meaning: "X's and O's", which are commonly used to denote the defense and offense in a football playbook

Technical information
- Licensing authority: FCC
- Facility ID: 12964
- Class: B
- Power: 5,000 watts
- Repeaters: 106.3 KXNO-FM (Ankeny); 107.5 KKDM-HD2 (Des Moines)

Links
- Public license information: Public file; LMS
- Webcast: Listen live (via iHeartRadio)
- Website: kxno.iheart.com

KXNO (1460 kHz) is a commercial AM radio station in Des Moines, Iowa. KXNO is owned by iHeartMedia, and airs a sports radio format. KXNO's studios are located in Des Moines, while its 2-tower transmitter array is located on Northeast Broadway Avenue near Capitol Heights.

KXNO is simulcast on 25,000 watt sister station KXNO-FM 106.3 in Ankeny, Iowa.

== Programming ==
Weekday mornings and afternoons feature local sports shows. In middays, syndicated shows from Dan Patrick and Colin Cowherd are heard. Nights and weekends, the station carries programming from the Fox Sports Radio Network. KXNO serves as the flagship station of the Iowa Wild in the American Hockey League (AHL). It broadcasts St. Louis Cardinals baseball games and Minnesota Vikings NFL games. It also carries Iowa State University women's basketball and coaches' shows.

== History ==
The station was first licensed on July 29, 1922, as WKAA in Cedar Rapids, Iowa, to the Republican Times and H. F. Parr, for operation on the "entertainment" wavelength of 360 meters (833 kHz). The call sign was randomly assigned from a sequential roster of available call letters. (Initially call letters beginning with "W" were generally assigned to stations east of an irregular line formed by the western state borders from North Dakota south to Texas, with calls beginning with "K" going only to stations in states west of that line. In January 1923 the Mississippi River was established as the new boundary, thus after this date Iowa stations generally received call letters starting with "K" instead of "W".) Later that year, ownership was changed to just H. F. Parr, and the station was authorized to also transmit on the 485-meter (619 kHz) "market and weather" wavelength. In 1923 WKAA was reassigned to 1120 kHz, which was changed to 1080 kHz in 1924. In late 1925 the call letters were changed to KWCR ("Keep Watching Cedar Rapids").

Following the establishment of the Federal Radio Commission (FRC), stations were initially issued a series of temporary authorizations starting on May 3, 1927. In addition, they were informed that if they wanted to continue operating, they needed to file a formal license application by January 15, 1928, as the first step in determining whether they met the new "public interest, convenience, or necessity" standard. On May 25, 1928, the FRC issued General Order 32, which notified 164 stations, including KWCR, that "From an examination of your application for future license it does not find that public interest, convenience, or necessity would be served by granting it." However, the station successfully convinced the commission that it should remain licensed.

On November 11, 1928, the FRC implemented a major reallocation of station transmitting frequencies, as part of a reorganization resulting from its implementation of General Order 40. KWCR was assigned to 1310 kHz, sharing time with KFJY in Fort Dodge and KFGQ in Boone. In the 1930s, the station made additional frequency changes, eventually moving to fulltime operation on 1430 kHz.

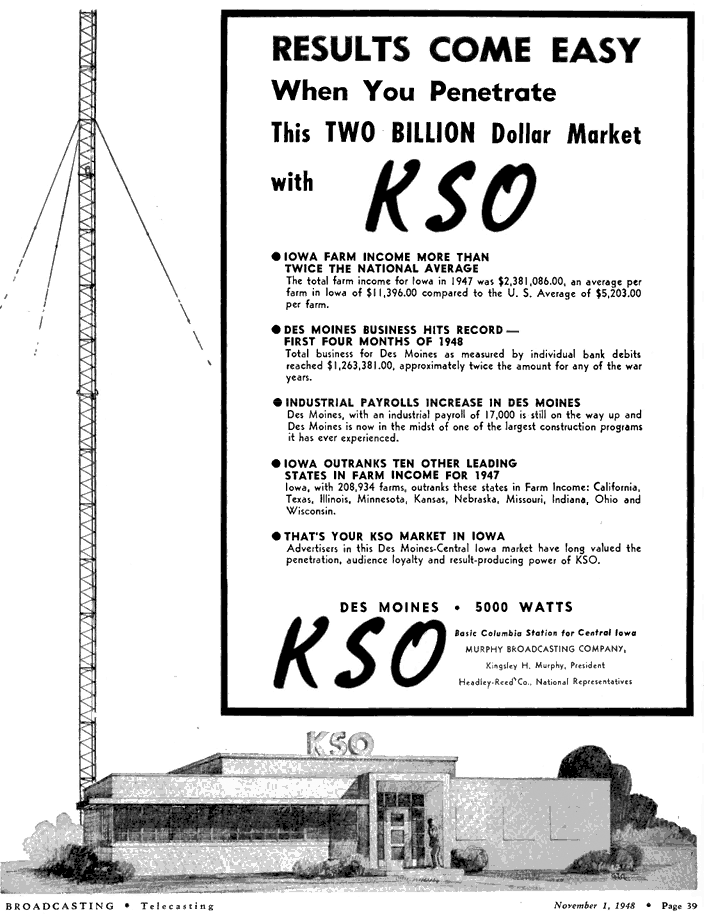
1948 advertisement as KSO.

On March 17, 1935, the KSO call letters were transferred from station on 1320 kHz to the former KWCR on 1430 kHz, which concurrently relocated from Cedar Rapids to Des Moines. This same day the call letters of the original KSO on 1320 kHz were changed to KRNT. Both stations were owned and operated by subsidiary corporations of the Des Moines Register-Tribune. This new KSO became an affiliate of the NBC Blue Network, carrying its schedule of dramas, comedies, news, sports, soap operas, game shows and big band broadcasts during the "Golden Age of Radio". At that time, the station broadcast with 250 watts daytime and 100 watts at night and had its studios in the newspaper's building.

KSO changed frequencies one last time as part of the North American Regional Broadcasting Agreement of 1941, moving from 1430 to 1460 kHz. KSO and KRNT were both owned by the Cowles family until 1944, when they sold KSO after the Federal Communications Commission (FCC) ruled that one company could not own two radio stations in the same market.

KSO had a successful country music format from 1974 until 1989, becoming number one in 1976, beating WHO in the metro ratings. On September 1, 1989, KSO began simulcasting KGGO-FM's album rock format, taking on the KGGO call sign in the process.

In January 1994, the station became KDMI, broadcasting religious and Spanish language programming. Clear Channel Communications (now iHeartMedia) acquired KDMI in 2000. On January 1, 2001, KDMI became KXNO and adopted its current sports radio format. KXNO had two direct competitors: KXTK (940 AM, now KPSZ) and KJJC (107.1 FM, now KNWI). Both stations changed formats by mid-2003.

In 2008, KXNO was nominated for a Marconi Award as the "Sports Station of the Year", given annually by the National Association of Broadcasters.

On January 14, 2020, KXNO laid off its programming director, a producer, and four on-air personalities as part of a larger wave of layoffs by iHeartMedia due to a corporate restructuring. The layoffs included its morning hosts Travis Justice and Heather Burnside, and afternoon drive hosts Chris Williams and Ross Peterson. The layoffs were met with a negative response: in solidarity with their colleagues, fellow KXNO hosts Andy Fales and Keith Murphy protested the layoffs by cancelling their show for the day, and encouraged local sponsors to threaten boycotts of the station. Fales told Rolling Stone that the threat of the station's programming of local interest being replaced by nationally-syndicated personalities, with no adequate alternative available, was a disservice to the region's "passionate sports fans". The layoffs also generated criticism from listeners via social media.

On January 16, 2020, the station's general manager Joel McCrea announced that iHeartMedia had given him permission to reinstate the employees. In addition, it was announced that KDXA would drop its alternative rock format and become an FM simulcast of KXNO.

On August 5, 2024, iHeartMedia began simulcasting KXNO's local programming on KOSY-FM in Cedar Rapids; KMNS in Sioux City; KXIC in Iowa City; and WFXN in Moline, Illinois, under the "Iowa Sports Radio Network" name.

=== Larry Cotlar and Marty Tirrell feud ===
During 2008 and 2009, a feud brewed between morning show host Larry Cotlar and afternoon drive host Marty Tirrell. Tirrell and his radio partner, Ken Miller, had been critical of Cotlar's perceived bias towards the Drake University Bulldogs. They were also critical of Cotlar's interview style of "lobbing softball questions" to his guests.

On March 20, 2009, things boiled over in the KXNO studios as Tirrell initiated a verbal tirade, using harsh words that was heard briefly on the air. They included the word "fuck" a dozen times, mostly by Tirrell, who at times seemed to be on the verge of a breakdown. The two were suspended for a week as a result, with The Dan Patrick Show temporarily taking its time slot.

On March 25, both hosts, as well as the board operator, Geoff Conn, were fired from their positions. FCC complaint reports were filed March 25 from an anonymous source. Tirrell's weekly sports commentary for CBS affiliate KCCI, Mouth of the Midwest, was also cancelled. Cotlar later apologized to Clear Channel to and the station's listeners for the incident.

Cotlar's morning slot was filled by Jon Miller, the sports director of sister station WHO, and Steve Deace, who hosted an afternoon talk show on WHO and previously hosted an afternoon show on KXNO.

On April 20, a new show hosted by WHO-TV personalities Keith Murphy and Andy Fales debuted in the 2-4 p.m. time slot. Tirrell and Cotlar later joined rival station KBGG.
