= Proudfoot & Bird =

American architectural firm

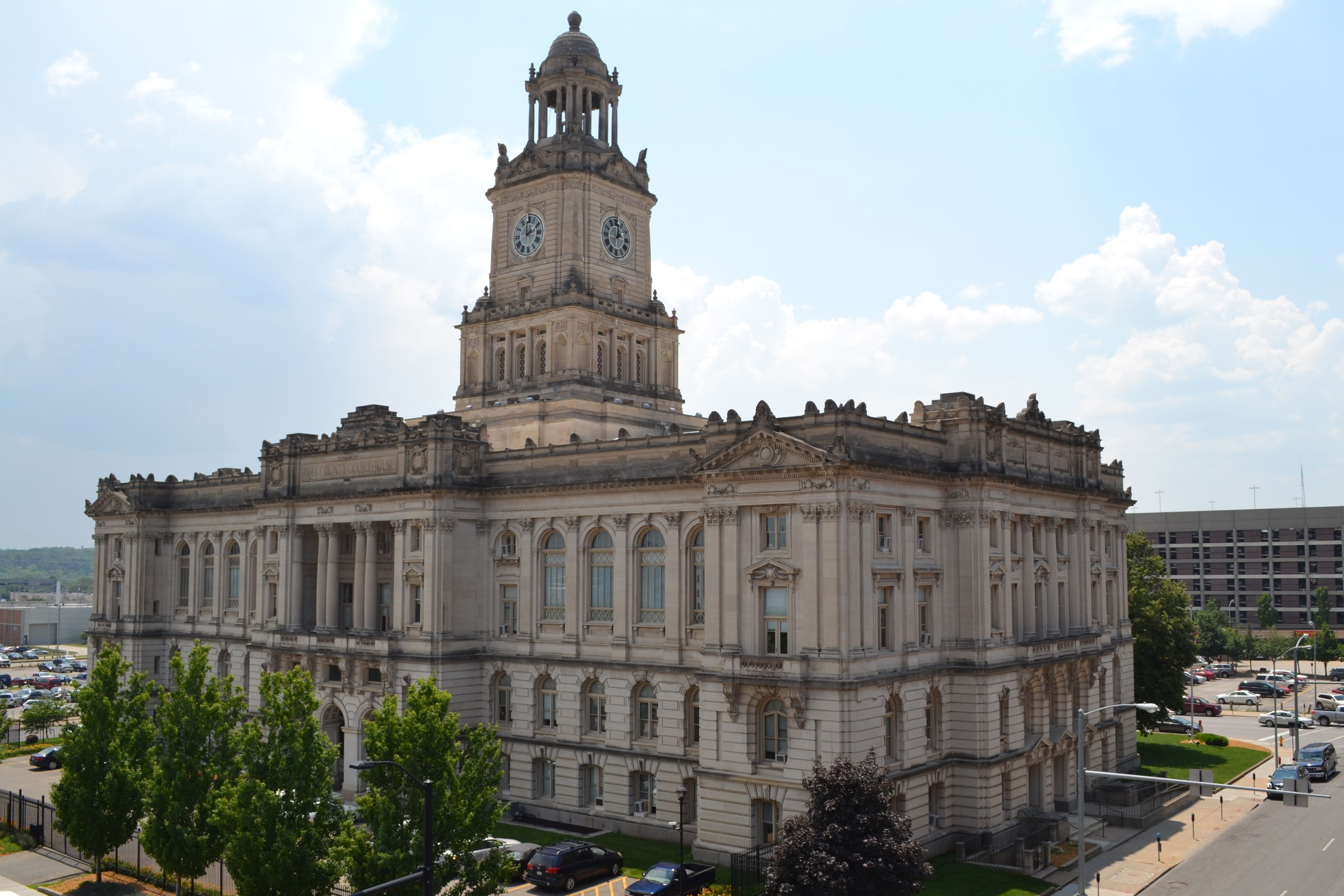
The Polk County Courthouse in Des Moines, designed by Proudfoot & Bird beginning in 1900 and built from 1902 to 1906.

Proudfoot & Bird was an American architectural firm that designed many buildings throughout the Midwest region of the United States. Originally established in 1882, it remains active through its several successors, and since 2017 has been known as BBS Architects | Engineers.

== History ==
The firm of Proudfoot & Bird was originally established in Huron, Dakota Territory in 1882 by William Thomas Proudfoot (1860–1928) and George Washington Bird (1854–1950). Though they practiced variously in South Dakota, Kansas, Utah and Iowa, they are best known for their works in Iowa.

William T. Proudfoot (who later went by Willis) was born May 2, 1860, in Indianola, Iowa, to Elias Proudfoot, a carpenter, and Martha Ann (Barnett) Proudfoot. He attended the local schools, and by 1880 was working as a draftsman for William Foster, then the leading architect of Des Moines. George Washington Bird was born September 1, 1854, in New Jersey. His early life or when he came west is unknown, but he was probably educated in Philadelphia. By 1882, he had joined Proudfoot in Foster's office. That same year, the two young architects went northwest to Huron in what is now South Dakota, and first established the firm of Proudfoot & Bird. At that time the Dakota Territory was at the peak of what is referred to as the Great Dakota Boom, when the territory experienced significant investment and population growth. In 1883 the partners relocated to Pierre, though it was not yet the capital. They designed several buildings in Pierre which survive. It was during this time that Proudfoot briefly went east, spending the winter of 1884–85 in the architecture school of the Massachusetts Institute of Technology. After his return in 1885, when the Dakota Boom was beginning to slow, the partners moved south to Wichita, Kansas, then undergoing an even larger boom. They were more successful in Wichita, where they designed the City Hall, the YMCA, several colleges and universities and many homes and businesses. However, by 1890 the boom had collapsed, and in 1891 the partners went even further west to Salt Lake City.

In Salt Lake City the partners formed a partnership with the established local architect Henry Monheim (1824–1893), which was known as Monheim, Bird & Proudfoot. This firm almost immediately won the competition to design the new Salt Lake City and County Building. Monheim died in 1893, and Proudfoot & Bird was reestablished. In addition to the City and County Building, completed in 1894, they designed several homes and other structures in Salt Lake City. In 1895, with the economy in decline, Proudfoot went to Kansas City, and Bird to Philadelphia. In 1896 they returned to Iowa, and reestablished Proudfoot & Bird in Des Moines, where it would remain. In 1898 they won the job to design Schaeffer Hall at the University of Iowa in Iowa City, a project which cemented their reputation in Iowa, and over the next decade became the leading architects in the state.

In 1910 Proudfoot & Bird was merged with the firm of Hallett & Rawson, and became Proudfoot, Bird & Rawson with third partner Harry D. Rawson (1872–1934). In 1913, owing to ill health, George W. Bird retired, (Note: Several years after retiring from Proudfoot, Bird & Rawson, Bird relocated to Los Angeles where he lived for the rest of his life. He was apparently attracted there by the movie business, though his later career is unknown. He died there September 7, 1953.) though his name was not removed from that of the firm. In 1925 Proudfoot and Rawson were joined by H. Clark Souers (1888–1970) as partner, and the firm finally dropped Bird's name and became Proudfoot, Rawson & Souers. In 1928 Proudfoot died, (Note: Proudfoot never retired, and worked with the firm until his death, which occurred June 8, 1928.) and in 1929 the partnership was further expanded to include Oren Thomas (died 1955), a school specialist, and became Proudfoot, Rawson, Souers & Thomas. In 1932 Souers and Thomas both retired, and J. Woolson Brooks (1897–1982) and Elmer H. Borg (1893–1970), who had joined the firm in 1912 and 1913 respectively, joined the partnership. By this time the Great Depression was well underway and the firm's business was severely reduced. Whereas Souers had invested $50,000 to join the partnership, Brooks and Borg only had to contribute $2,000 each. The new firm was known as Proudfoot, Rawson, Brooks & Borg. When Rawson died in 1934, (Note: Harry Dustan Rawson was born September 1, 1872 in Des Moines. He was educated at the Massachusetts Institute of Technology, graduating in 1896. He worked for Joseph Lyman Silsbee in Chicago and George E. Hallett in Des Moines before becoming Hallett's partner in the firm of Hallett & Rawson in 1898. When Hallett retired in 1910, Rawson merged his business with Proudfoot & Bird. He died February 14, 1934.) Brooks and Borg were the sole partners. Following World War II, in 1945, the firm was renamed Brooks-Borg. In 1966 they were joined by Paul Skiles (1921-1991) as partner, and the firm became Brooks-Borg-Skiles. It kept this name under several changes of leadership until 2017, when it became BBS Architects | Engineers, which it remains in 2022.

== Legacy ==
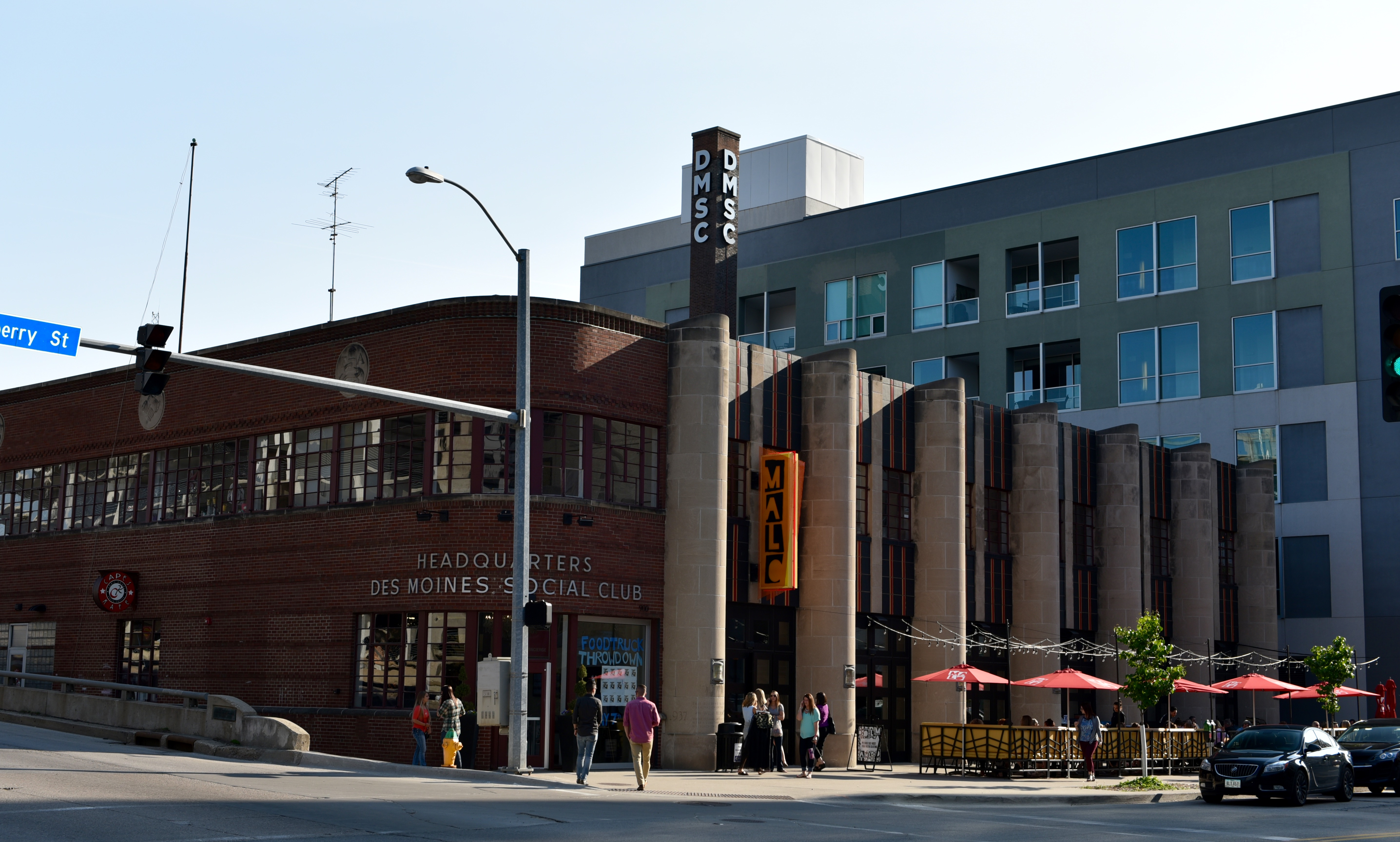
The former Des Moines Fire Department Headquarters, designed by Proutfoot, Rawson, Brooks & Borg and completed in 1937, is indicative of the firm's embrace of Modern architecture.

Proudfoot & Bird and their successors were the leading architects in Iowa for several decades. Under its founders the firm had a conservative design philosophy, and worked in the popular Revival styles of the time. Early works were designed in the Italianate or Victorian Gothic styles, before the rise in popularity of the Richardsonian Romanesque in the mid-1880s. The architecture at the World's Columbian Exposition in Chicago in 1893 spurred the popularity of Beaux-Arts architecture in the United States, and Proudfoot & Bird followed suit. Though other styles were chosen for other buildings, the Classical architecture of the Beaux-Arts movement was the norm in the firm's work until Proudfoot's death. After this, the surviving members of the firm looked to more modern styles, including the Art Deco, Streamline Moderne and International Style during the Great Depression and lead-up to World War II. After the war, Brooks-Borg embraced Modern architecture, was associated with Eliel Saarinen and Eero Saarinen on several projects, and later designed several Brutalist and Postmodern buildings.

A large number of their pre-war buildings which survive are listed on the United States National Register of Historic Places. Many of these were listed as part of one 1988 study and multiple property submission. In 1988 there were 25 known surviving Proudfoot, Bird & Rawson buildings in Des Moines alone. Their work was also part of the architecture event in the art competition at the 1928 Summer Olympics.

== List of works ==
- First M. E. Church, Kansas Ave and 4th St SE, Huron, South Dakota (1883–84, demolished 1918)
- Central Block, 323 S Pierre St, Pierre, South Dakota (1884, NRHP 1989)
- First National Bank Building, 401 S Pierre St, Pierre, South Dakota (1884)
- Hughes County Courthouse, 104 E Capitol Ave, Pierre, South Dakota (1884, demolished)
- Karcher Block, 366 S Pierre St, Pierre, South Dakota (1884, NRHP 1993)
- Davis Administration Building, (Note: Originally built for the defunct Garfield University, closed in 1893.) Friends University, Wichita, Kansas (1886–88, NRHP 1971)
- "Hillside Cottage" for Willis T. Proudfoot, 303 Circle Dr, Wichita, Kansas (1887, NRHP 1976)
- ”The Aviary” 330 Circle Drive, Wichita, Kansas (1887) designed and built for his own residence by George Bird.
- "Riverside Cottage" for Thomas G. Fitch, 901 Spaulding Ave, Wichita, Kansas (1887, NRHP 1989)
- YMCA Building (former), 332 E 1st St N, Wichita, Kansas (1887–88, NRHP 1972)
- Bethel College Administration Building, Bethel College, North Newton, Kansas (1888–92, NRHP 1972)
- "Fairmount Cottage" for A. S. Parks, 1717 Fairmount Ave, Wichita, Kansas (1888, attributed, NRHP 1985)
- Wallace Hall, Simpson College, Indianola, Iowa (1888, NRHP 1991)
- McCormick School, 855 S Martinson St, Wichita, Kansas (1889–90, NRHP 1978)
- Wichita City Hall (former), 204 S Main St, Wichita, Kansas (1890–92, NRHP 1971)
- Salt Lake City and County Building, 451 Washington Sq, Salt Lake City, Utah (1891–94, NRHP 1970)
- House for Elliott M. S. Best, 1146 S 900 E, Salt Lake City, Utah (1893, NRHP 1980)
- Schaeffer Hall, (Note: One of the four buildings designed by Proudfoot & Bird and their successors in the Pentacrest, NRHP-listed in 1978.) University of Iowa, Iowa City, Iowa (1898–99)
- St. Paul's Episcopal Church, 712 Farnham St, Harlan, Iowa (1899–1900, NRHP 1978)
- Dallas County Courthouse, (Note: A contributing property to the Adel Public Square Historic District, NRHP-listed in 2009.) 801 Court St, Adel, Iowa (1900–02, NRHP 1973)
- Marston Hall, Iowa State University, Ames, Iowa (1900–03)
- "Seven Oaks" alterations for Eli Bailey, 707 Audubon St, Sac City, Iowa (c.1900, NRHP 1996)
- Polk County Courthouse, 6th and Mulberry Sts, Des Moines, Iowa (1902–06, NRHP 1979)
- Sciences Library and Biology Building, (Note: A contributing property to the Jefferson Street Historic District, NRHP-listed in 2004.) University of Iowa, Iowa City, Iowa (1902–04)
- Alumni Hall, Iowa State University, Ames, Iowa (1904–07, NRHP 1978)
- Macbride Hall, University of Iowa, Iowa City, Iowa (1904–08)
- Beardshear Hall, Iowa State University, Ames, Iowa (1906–08)
- Curtiss Hall, Iowa State University, Ames, Iowa (1906–08)
- First United Methodist Church, 10th and Pleasant Sts, Des Moines, Iowa (1906–08, NRHP 1984)
- Greek Orthodox Church of St. George, (Note: Originally built for the Elmwood United Presbyterian Church, and acquired by the Greek church in 1930.) 1110 35th St, Des Moines, Iowa (1906, NRHP 1987)
- Carnegie Hall, (Note: Built with funds provided by Andrew Carnegie and the Carnegie Corporation of New York.) (Note: A contributing property to the Drake University Campus Historic District, NRHP-listed in 1988.) Drake University, Des Moines, Iowa (1907–08)
- Champlin Memorial Masonic Temple, 602 Story St, Boone, Iowa (1907, NRHP 1990)
- Chautauqua Auditorium, (Note: A contributing property to the Chautauqua Park Historic District, NRHP-listed in 2014.) Chautauqua Park, Sac City, Iowa (1908)
- First Christian Church (former), 2500 University Ave, Des Moines, Iowa (1908)
- Howard Hall addition, Drake University, Des Moines, Iowa (1908)
- Norman Apartment Building, 3103 University Ave, Des Moines, Iowa (1908, NRHP 1988)
- President's House, University of Iowa, Iowa City, Iowa (1908)
- House for August H. Bergman, 629 First Ave E, Newton, Iowa (1909, NRHP 1989)
- Jasper County Courthouse, (Note: A contributing property to the Newton Downtown Historic District, NRHP-listed in 2014.) 101 1st St N, Newton, Iowa (1909–11, NRHP 1981)
- Warfield, Pratt and Howell Company Warehouse addition, 100 West Court Ave, Des Moines, Iowa (1909, NRHP 1985)
- Colonials Club House, 217 Ash Ave, Ames, Iowa (1910, NRHP 2012)
- Des Moines City Hall, (Note: Designed by Proudfoot & Bird in association with Hallett & Rawson, Liebbe, Nourse & Rasmussen and Wetherell & Gage, all of Des Moines.) (Note: A contributing property to the Civic Center Historic District, NRHP-listed in 1988.) 400 Robert D Ray Dr, Des Moines, Iowa (1910–12, NRHP 1977)
- East High School, 813 E 13th St, Des Moines, Iowa (1910–11)
- MacLean Hall, University of Iowa, Iowa City, Iowa (1910–11)
- Audubon Public Library, 401 N Park Pl, Audubon, Iowa (1911–12)
- Trinity United Methodist Church, 1548 8th St, Des Moines, Iowa (1911, NRHP 1998)
- Colfax Public Library, 25 W Division St, Colfax, Iowa (1912–13)
- Herring Motor Car Company Building, 110 W 10th St, Des Moines, Iowa (1912–13, NRHP 2004)
- Johnson County Savings Bank Building, (Note: A contributing property to the Iowa City Downtown Historic District, NRHP-listed in 2021.) 102 S Clinton St, Iowa City, Iowa (1912, NRHP 2017)
- Sac City Free Library (former), 1001 W Main St, Sac City, Iowa (1912–13)
- Teachout Building, (Note: A contributing property to the East Des Moines Commercial Historic District, NRHP-listed in 2019.) 500-502 E Locust St, Des Moines, Iowa (1912, NRHP 1999)
- Empress Theatre, 412 8th St, Des Moines, Iowa (1913, demolished 1977)
- Hawkeye Insurance Company Building alterations, 209 4th St, Des Moines, Iowa (1913, NRHP 1986)
- Hubbell Building, 904 Walnut St, Des Moines, Iowa (1913, NRHP 2004)
- Masonic Temple, 1011 Locust St, Des Moines, Iowa (1913, NRHP 1997)
- BPOE Building, (Note: A contributing property to the Grinnell Historic Commercial District, NRHP-listed in 1991.) 800 Fourth Ave, Grinnell, Iowa (1914)
- Arlington Apartments, (Note: Originally owned by junior partner Harry D. Rawson and built as a companion to the Hallett Flats, designed and owned by Rawson's former partner, George E. Hallett. NRHP-listed in 2000 as part of the Hallett Flats–Rawson & Co. Apartment Building.) 1301 Locust St, Des Moines, Iowa (1915)
- First National Bank Building, 8th and Story Sts, Boone, Iowa (1915–16, NRHP 1989)
- Fort Dodge Municipal Building, (Note: A contributing property to the Fort Dodge Downtown Historic District, NRHP-listed in 2010.) 819 First Ave S, Fort Dodge, Iowa (1915)
- Grinnell Herald Building, 813 Fifth Ave, Grinnell, Iowa (1916, NRHP 1991)
- Hotel Ottumwa, 107 E 2nd St, Ottumwa, Iowa (1916–17, NRHP 2012)
- Northwestern Hotel, 321 E Walnut St, Des Moines, Iowa (1916, NRHP 1984)
- D.S. Chamberlain Building, 1312 Locust St, Des Moines, Iowa (1917, NRHP 2007)
- Hoyt Mansion, 220 W 7th St, Carroll, Iowa (1917)
- Greene County Courthouse, 114 N Chestnut St, Jefferson, Iowa (1918, NRHP 1978)
- Hotel Fort Des Moines, 10th and Walnut Sts, Des Moines, Iowa (1918–19, NRHP 1982)
- Stuit Hall, University of Iowa, Iowa City, Iowa (1918)
- Corydon Public Library (former), 110 S Franklin St, Corydon, Iowa (1919)
- House for John H. Herman, 711 S Story St, Boone, Iowa (1919, NRHP 1989)
- Lake City Community Memorial Building, 118 E Washington St, Lake City, Iowa (1920, NRHP 1990)
- Medical Education Building, University of Iowa, Iowa City, Iowa (1920–21)
- Apperson Iowa Motor Car Company Building, 1420 Locust St, Des Moines, Iowa (1921, NRHP 2016)
- Equitable Building, 604 Locust St, Des Moines, Iowa (1922–24, NRHP 2015)
- Abraham Lincoln High School, 2600 SW 9th St, Des Moines, Iowa (1922, NRHP 2002)
- Theodore Roosevelt High School, 4419 Center St, Des Moines, Iowa (1922, NRHP 2002)
- Spencer Memorial Chapel, (Note: A contributing property to the Penn College Historic District, NRHP-listed in 1996.) William Penn University, Oskaloosa, Iowa (1922–23)
- Parks Library, Iowa State University, Ames, Iowa (1923–25)
- Pocahontas County Courthouse, 99 Court Sq, Pocahontas, Iowa (1923, NRHP 1981)
- Jessup Hall, University of Iowa, Iowa City, Iowa (1924)
- Iowa Field House, University of Iowa, Iowa City, Iowa (1925–27)
- Fish and Game Pavilion and Aquarium, (Note: A contributing property to the Iowa State Fair and Exposition Grounds Historic District, NRHP-listed in 1987.) Iowa State Fairgrounds, Des Moines, Iowa (1926-27 and 1929, NRHP 1991)
- Food Sciences Building, Iowa State University, Ames, Iowa (1927–28, NRHP 1987)
- Memorial Union, Iowa State University, Ames, Iowa (1927-28 et seq.)
- University of Iowa Hospitals and Clinics, 220 Hawkins Dr, Iowa City, Iowa (1928)
- Des Moines Building, 405 6th Ave, Des Moines, Iowa (1930–31, NRHP 2013)
- Iowa-Des Moines National Bank Building, 520 Walnut St, Des Moines, Iowa (1931–32, NRHP 1979)
- David W. Smouse Opportunity School, 2820 Center St, Des Moines, Iowa (1931, NRHP 2002)
- United States Post Office and Courthouse, (Note: Designed in association with architect Herbert A. Kennison of Dubuque under Acting Supervising Architect James A. Wetmore.) (Note: A contributing property to the Cathedral Historic District, NRHP-listed in 1985.) 350 W 6th St, Dubuque, Iowa (1932–34)
- Des Moines Fire Department Headquarters (former), 900 Mulberry St, Des Moines, Iowa (1937–38, NRHP 2014)
- Hofmann Building, 101 S Market St, Ottumwa, Iowa (1941, NRHP 2010)
- Cathedral Church of Saint Paul parish house, 815 High St, Des Moines, Iowa (1952, NRHP 2010)
- Building 16, 403 W 4th St N, Newton, Iowa (1913–14)

== Gallery of architectural works ==
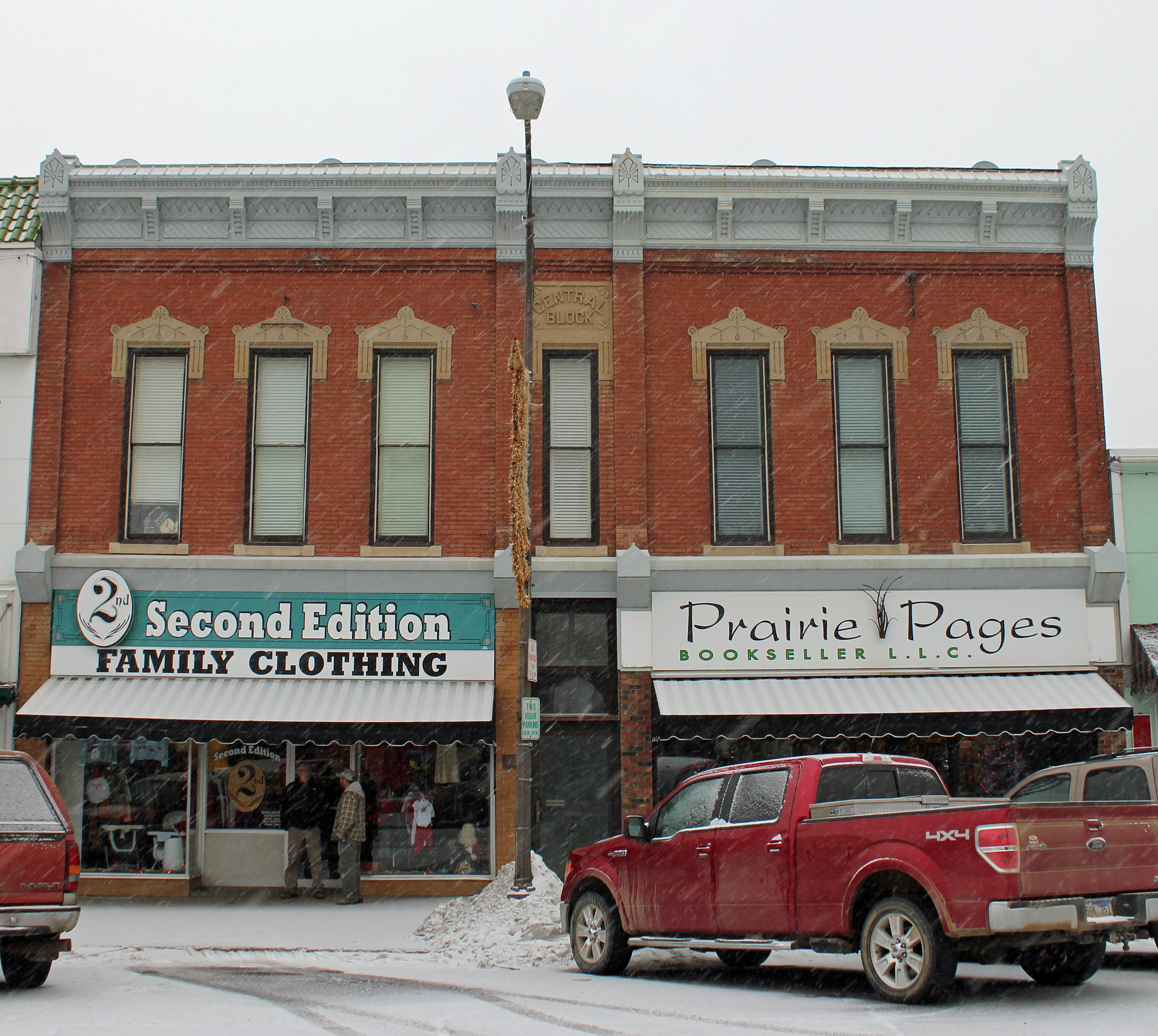
Central Block, Pierre, South Dakota, 1884.

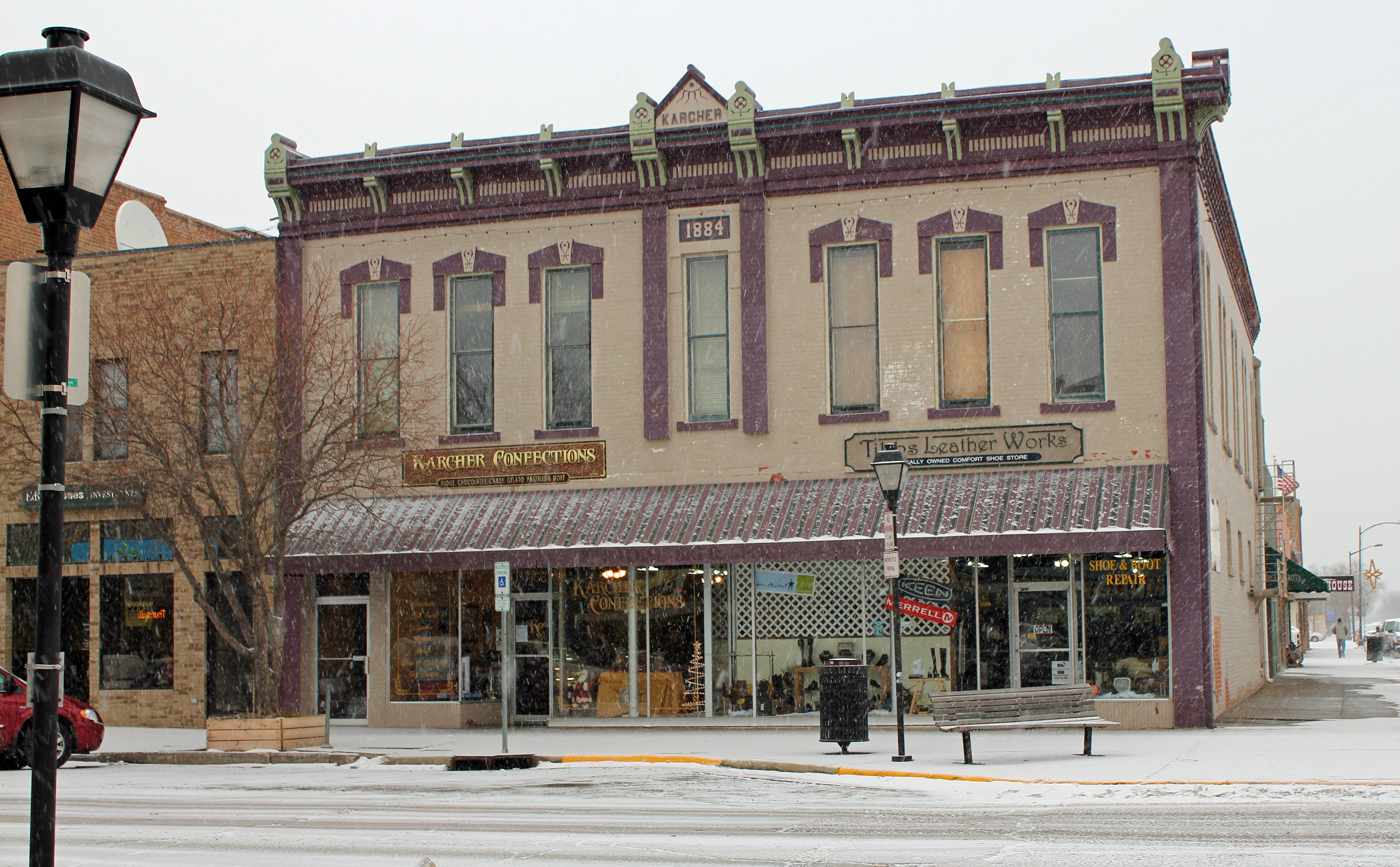
Karcher Block, Pierre, South Dakota, 1884.

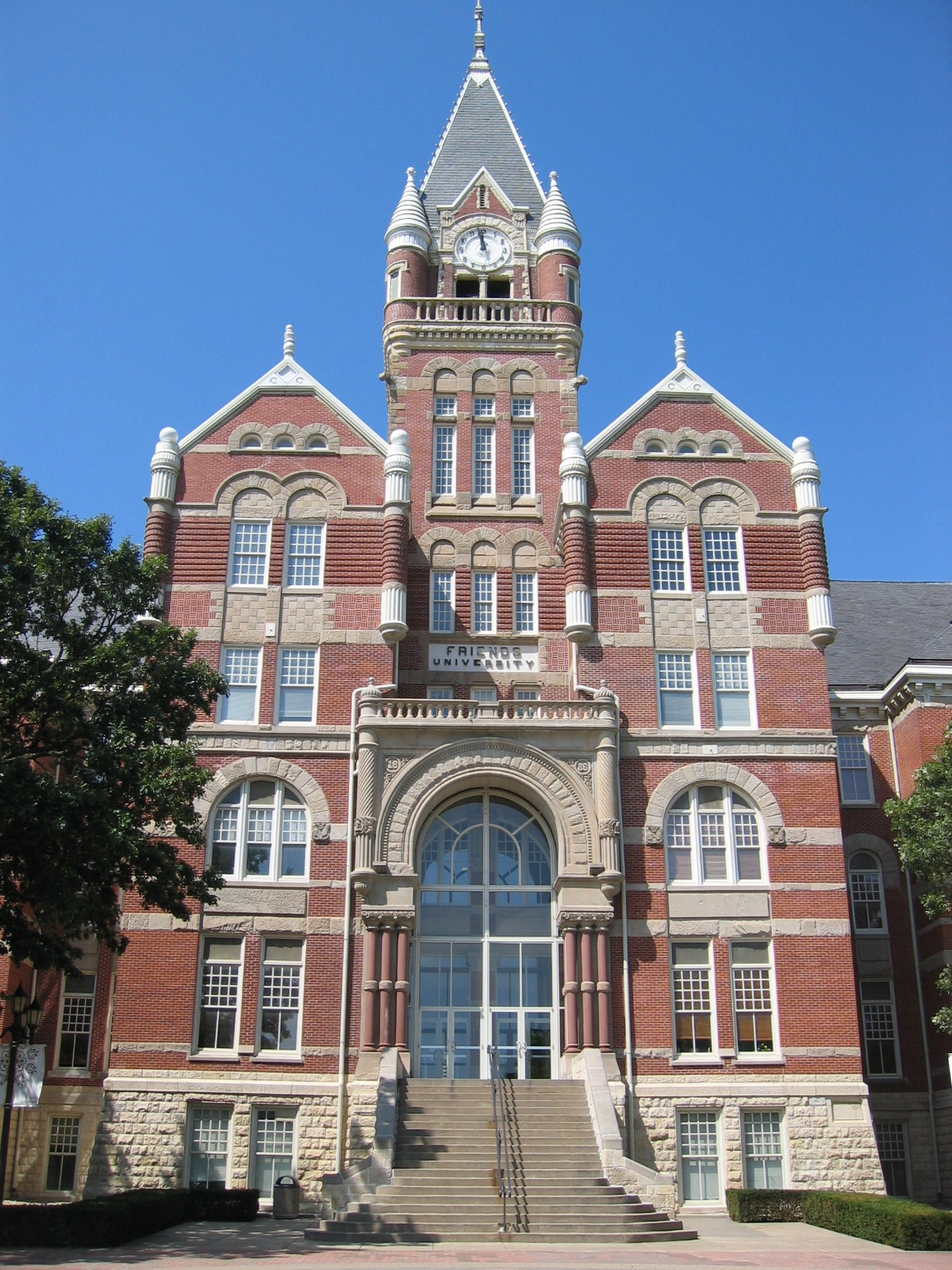
Davis Administration Building, Friends University, Wichita, Kansas, 1886-88.

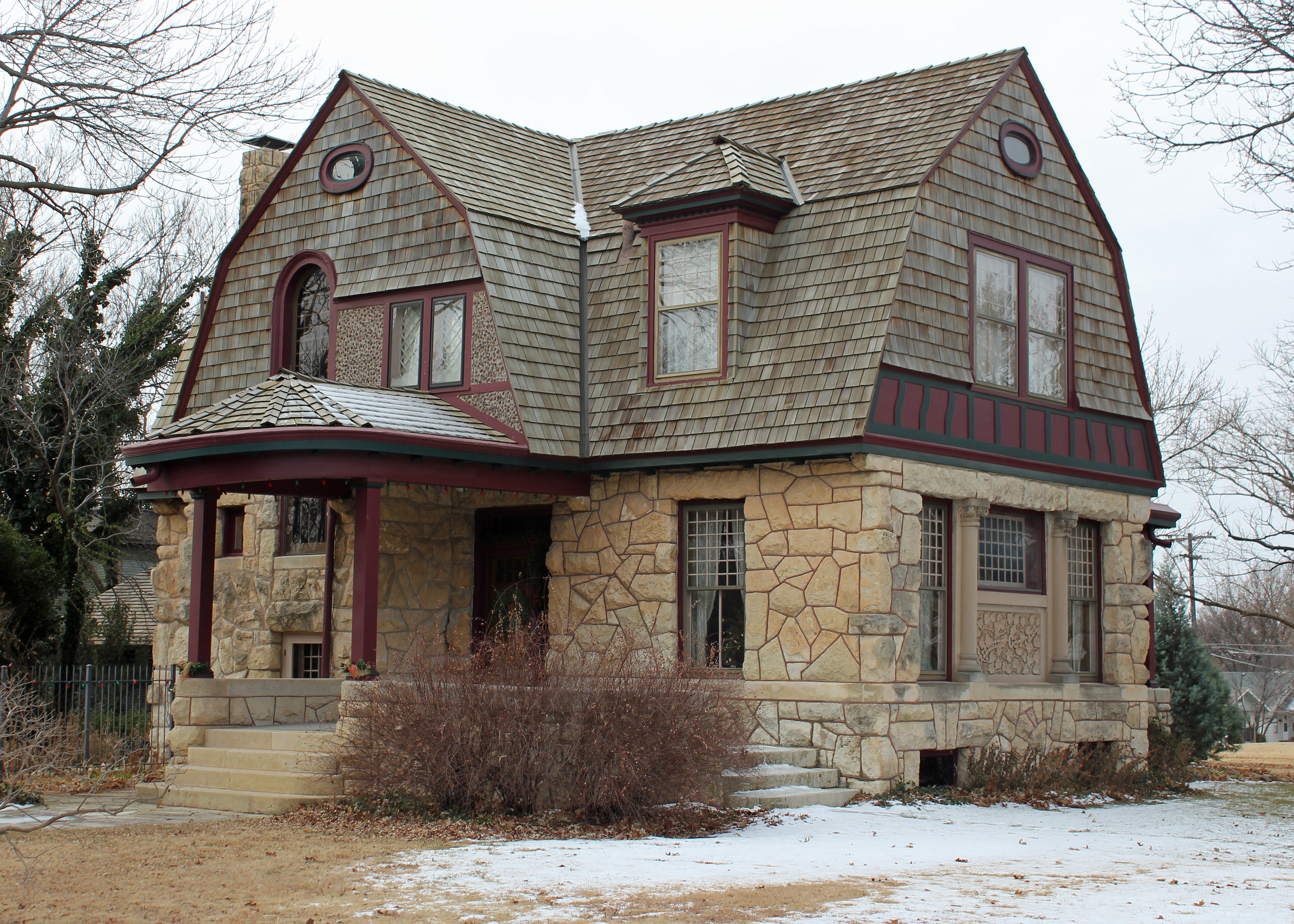
Hillside Cottage, Wichita, Kansas, 1887.

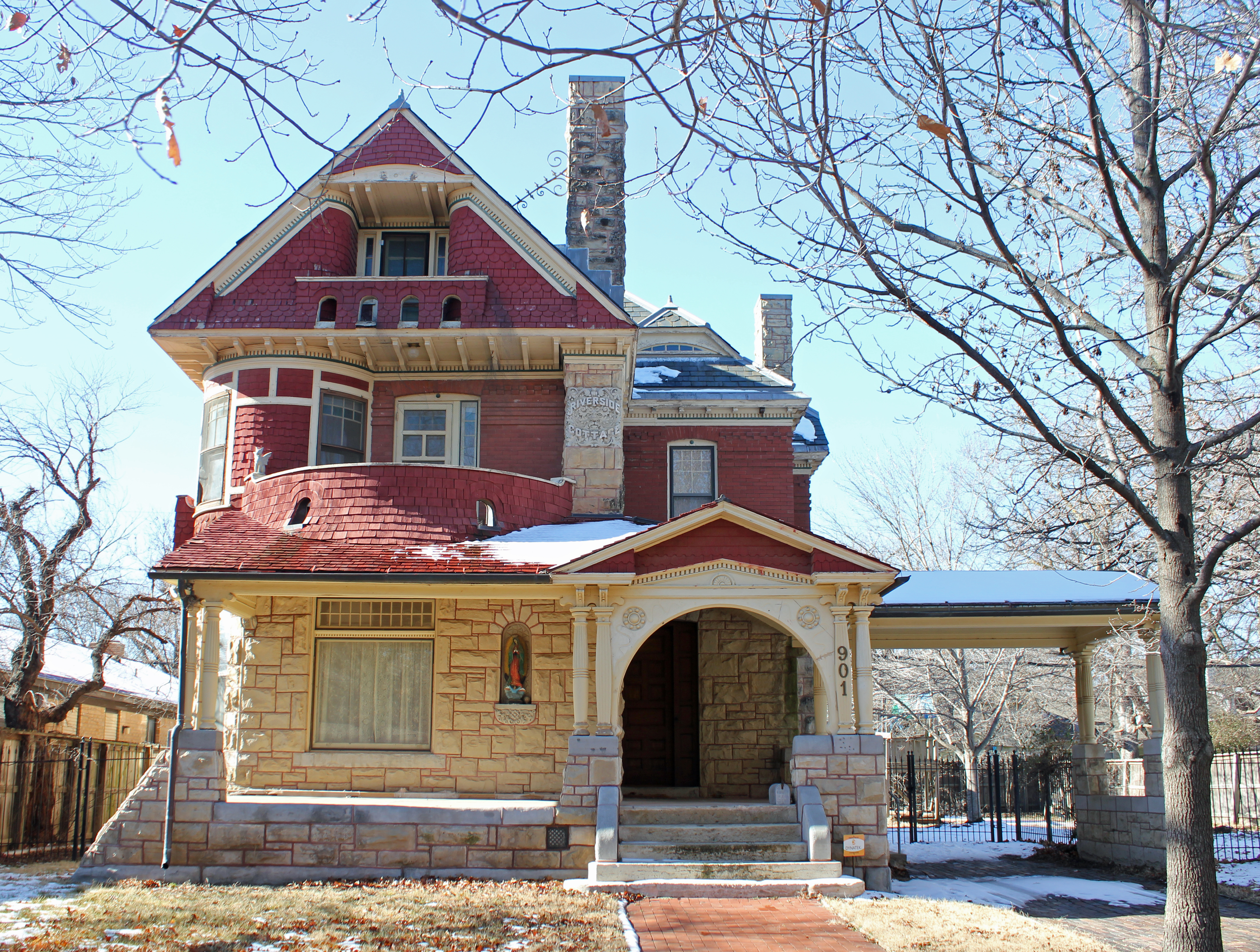
Riverside Cottage, Wichita, Kansas, 1887.

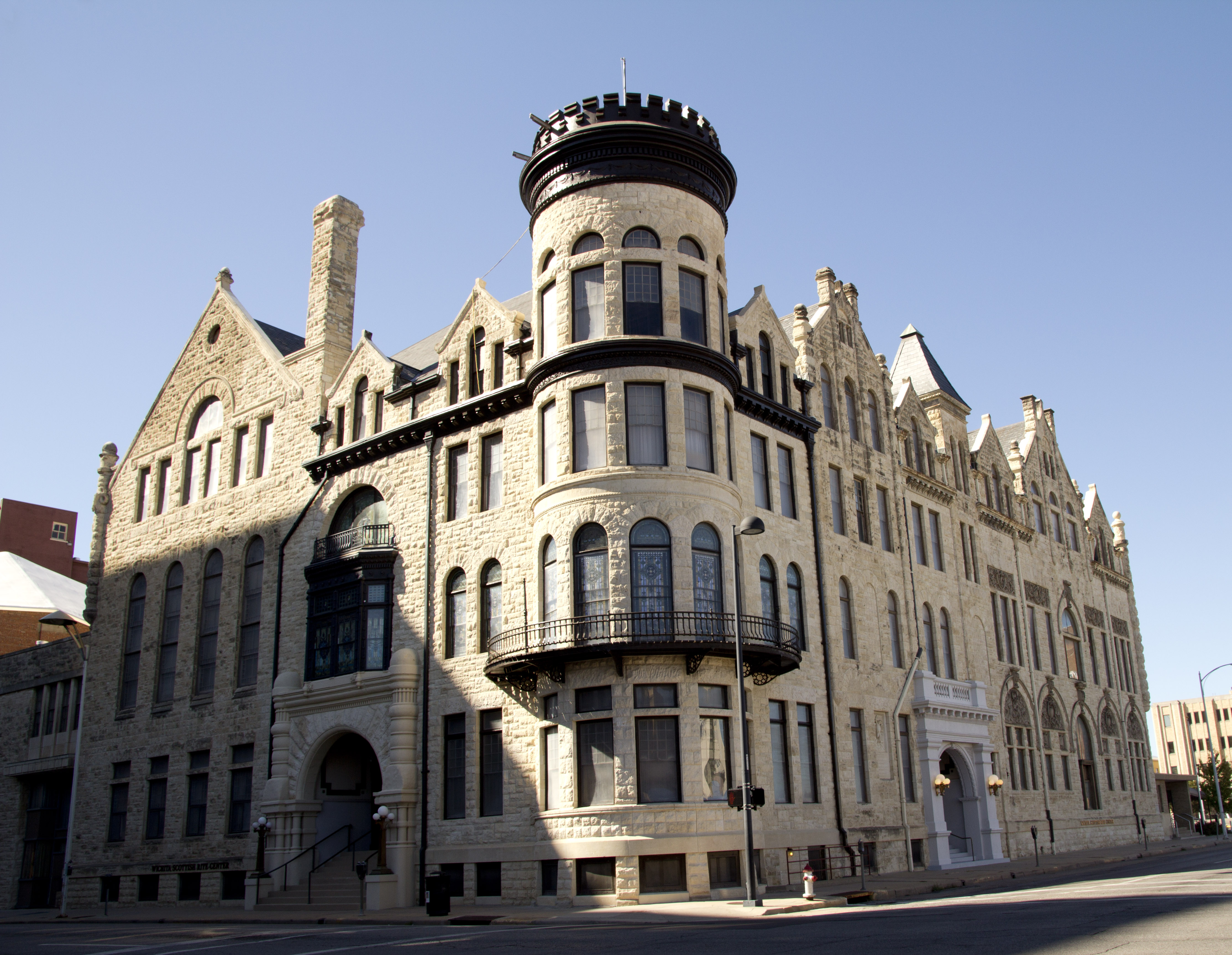
YMCA Building, Wichita, Kansas, 1887-88.

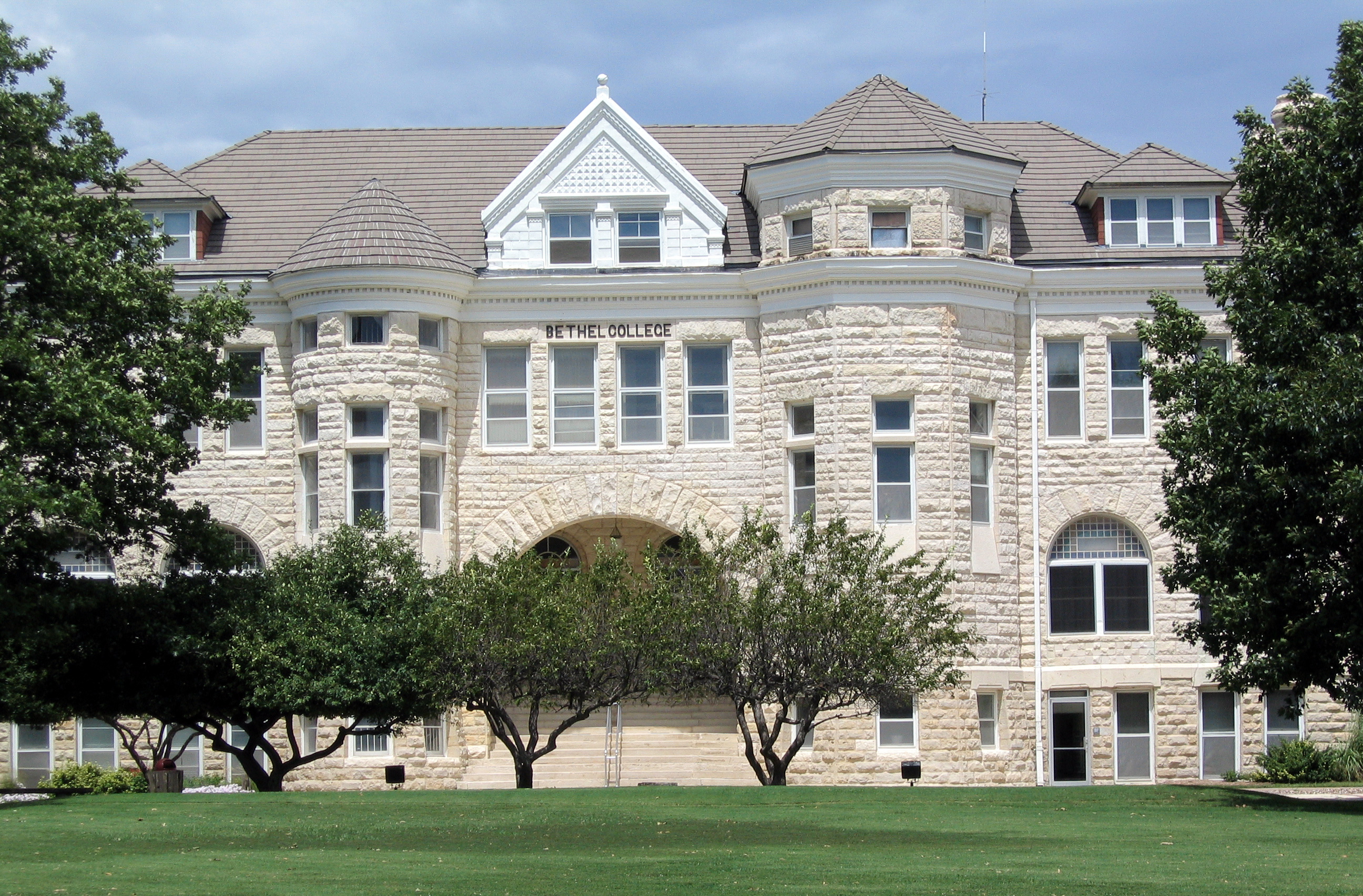
Bethel College Administration Building, Bethel College, North Newton, Kansas, 1888-92.

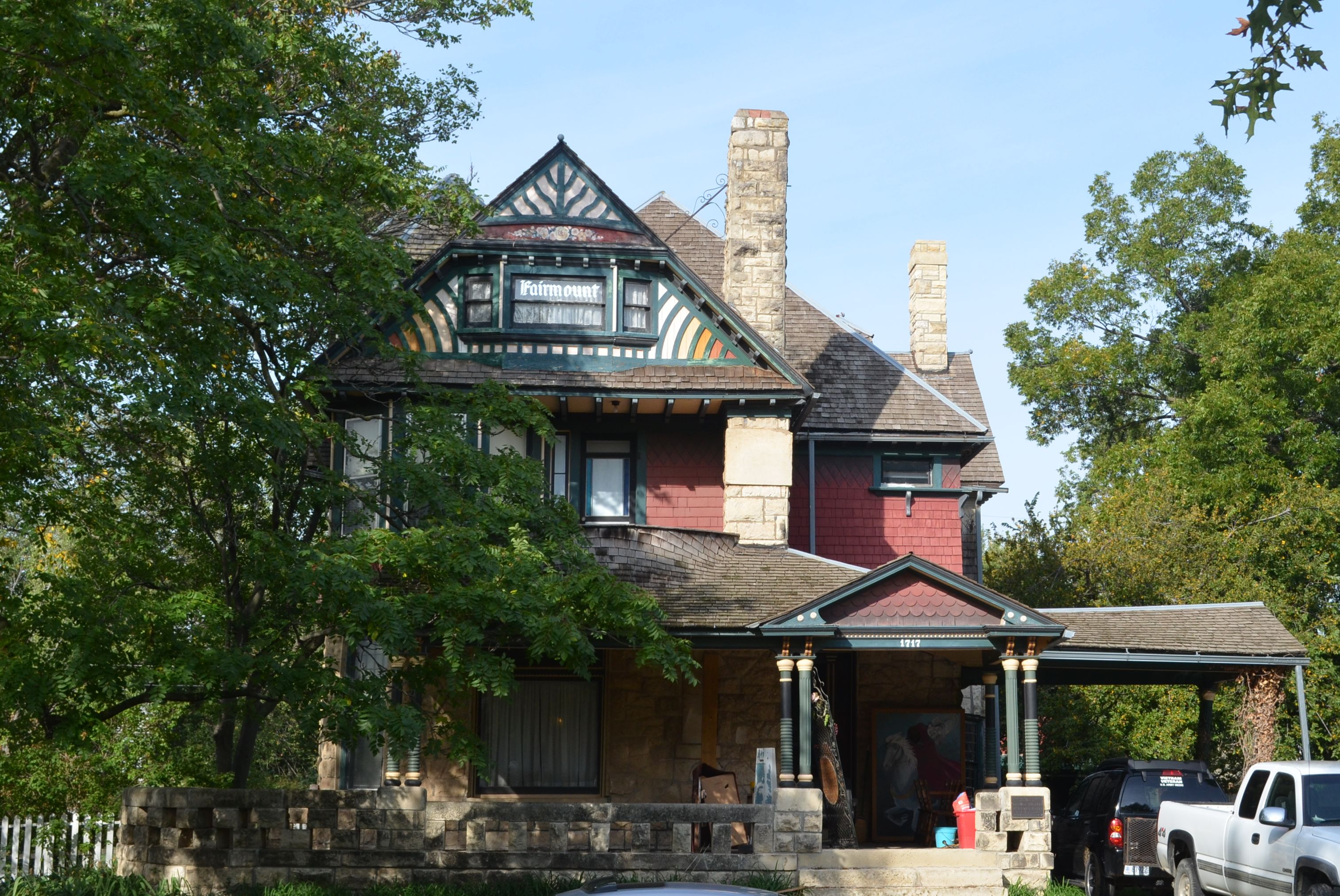
Fairmount Cottage, Wichita, Kansas, 1888.

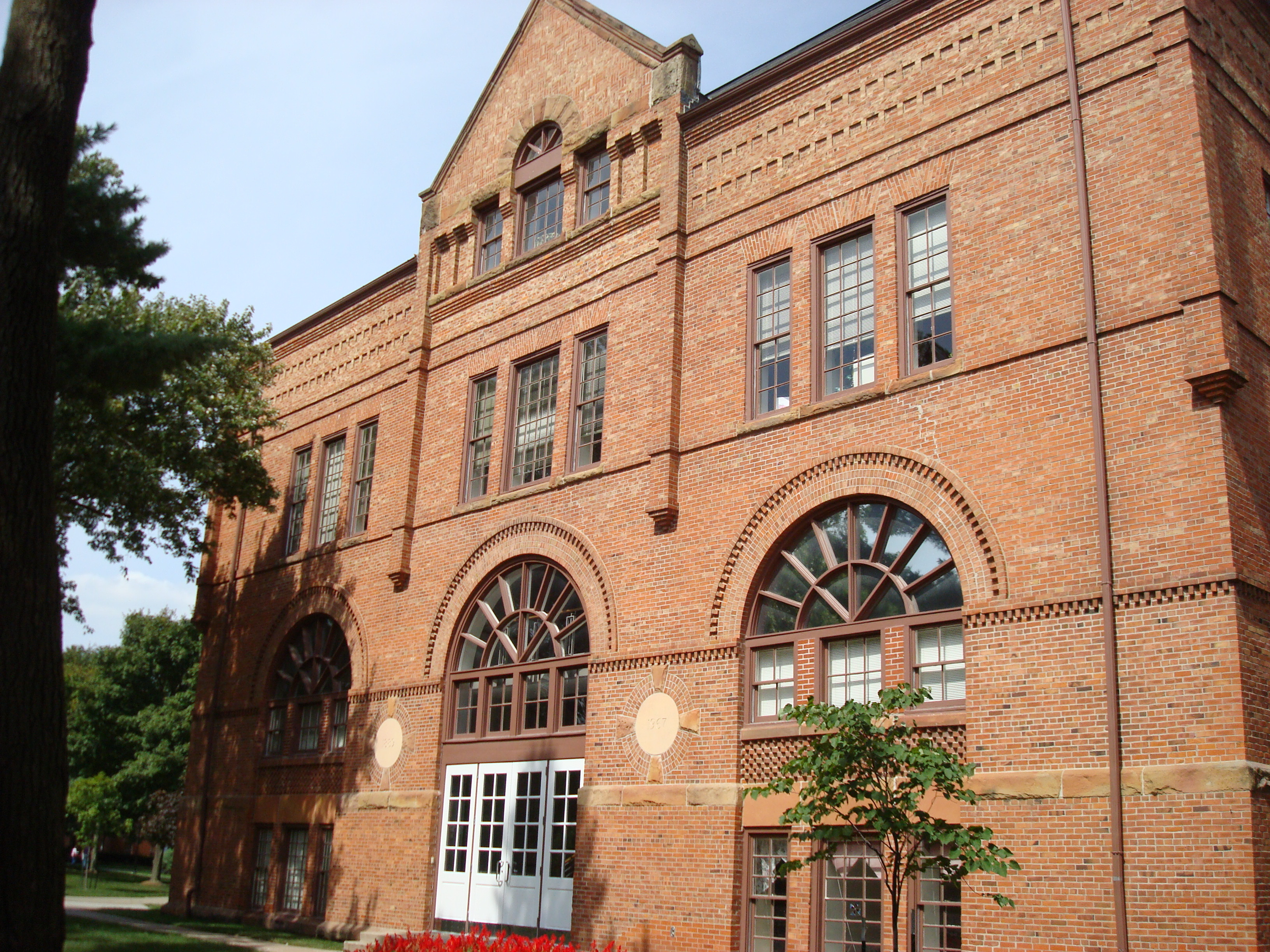
Wallace Hall, Simpson College, Indianola, Iowa, 1888.

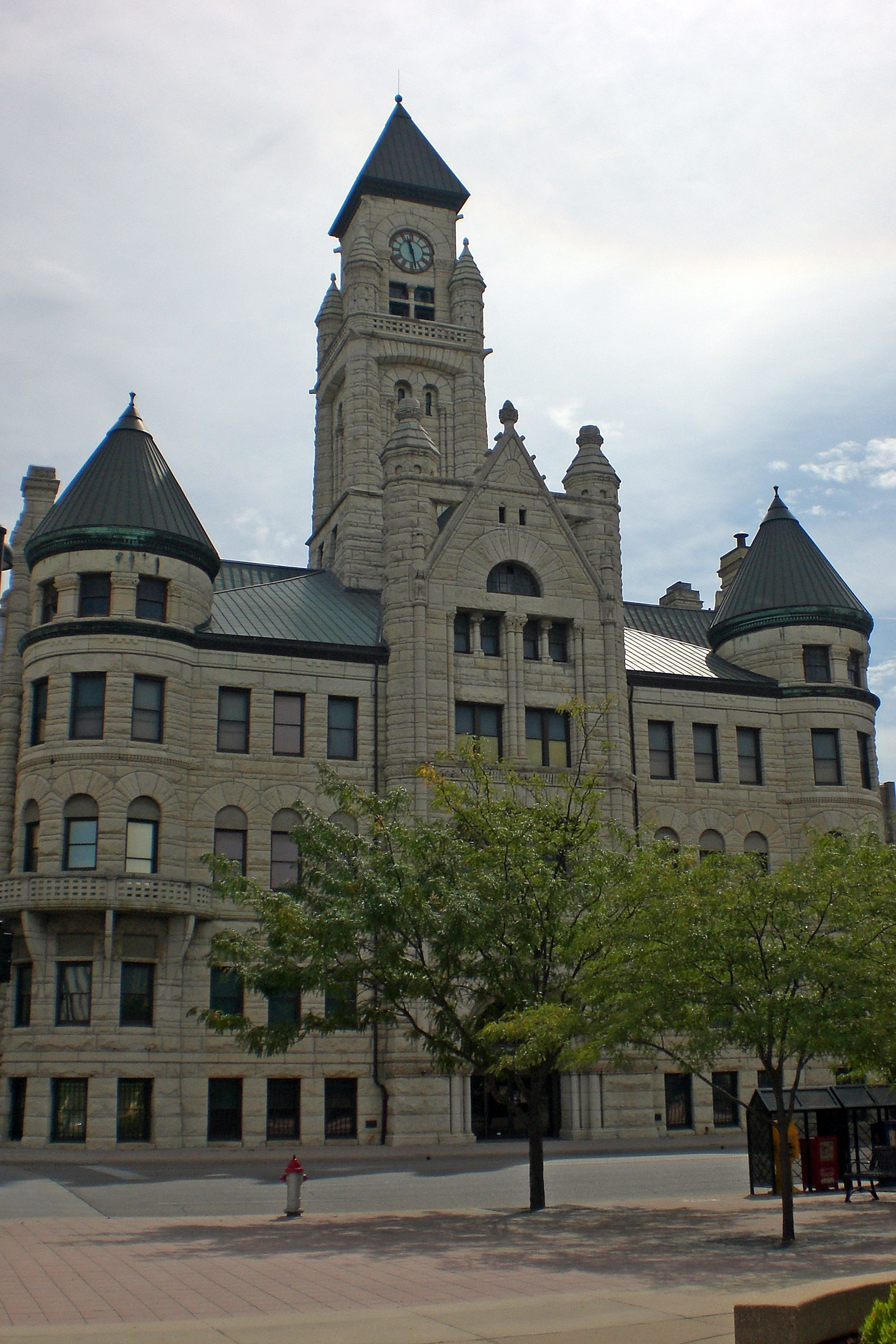
Wichita City Hall, Wichita, Kansas, 1890-92.

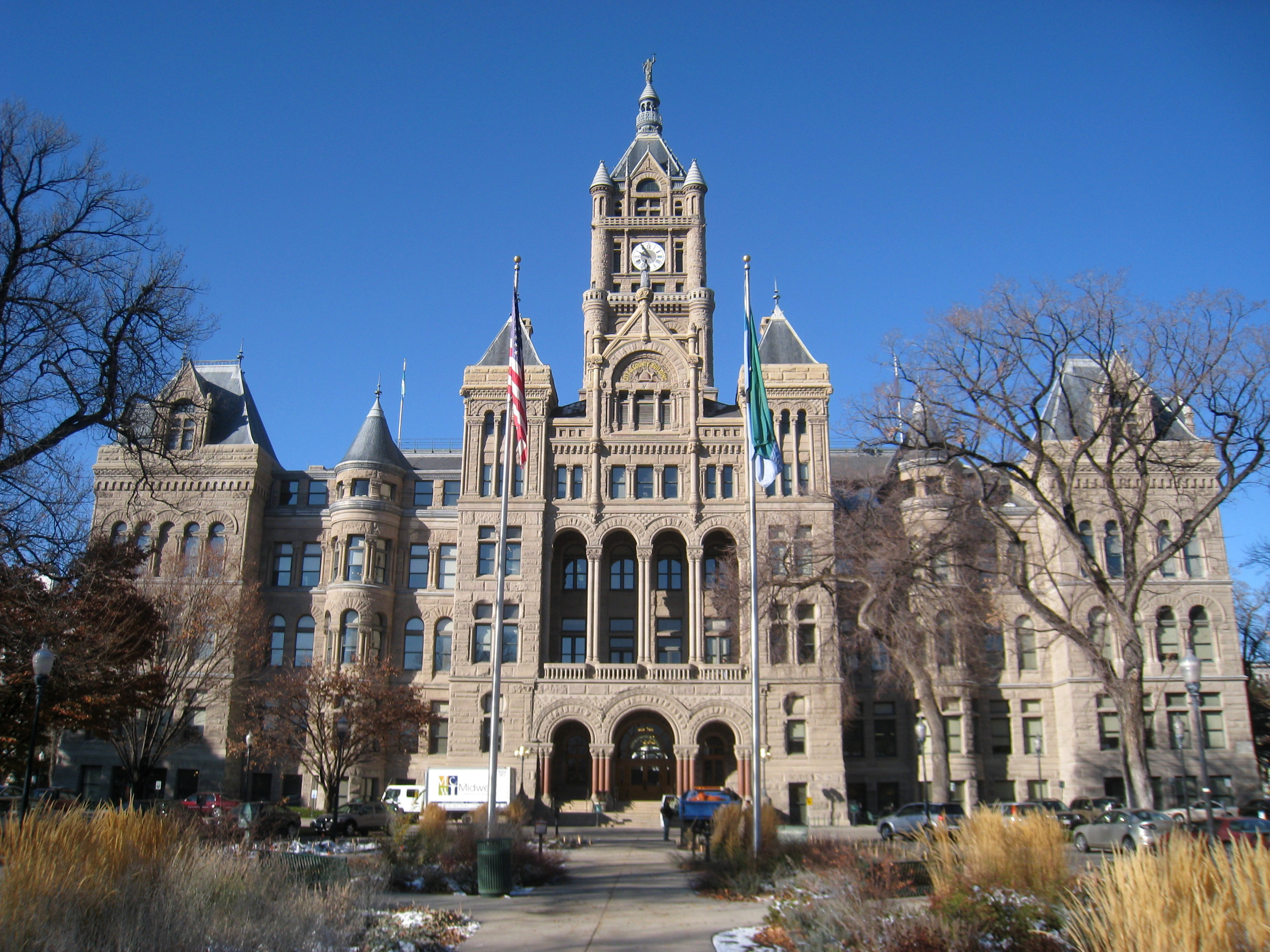
Salt Lake City and County Building, Salt Lake City, Utah, 1891-94.

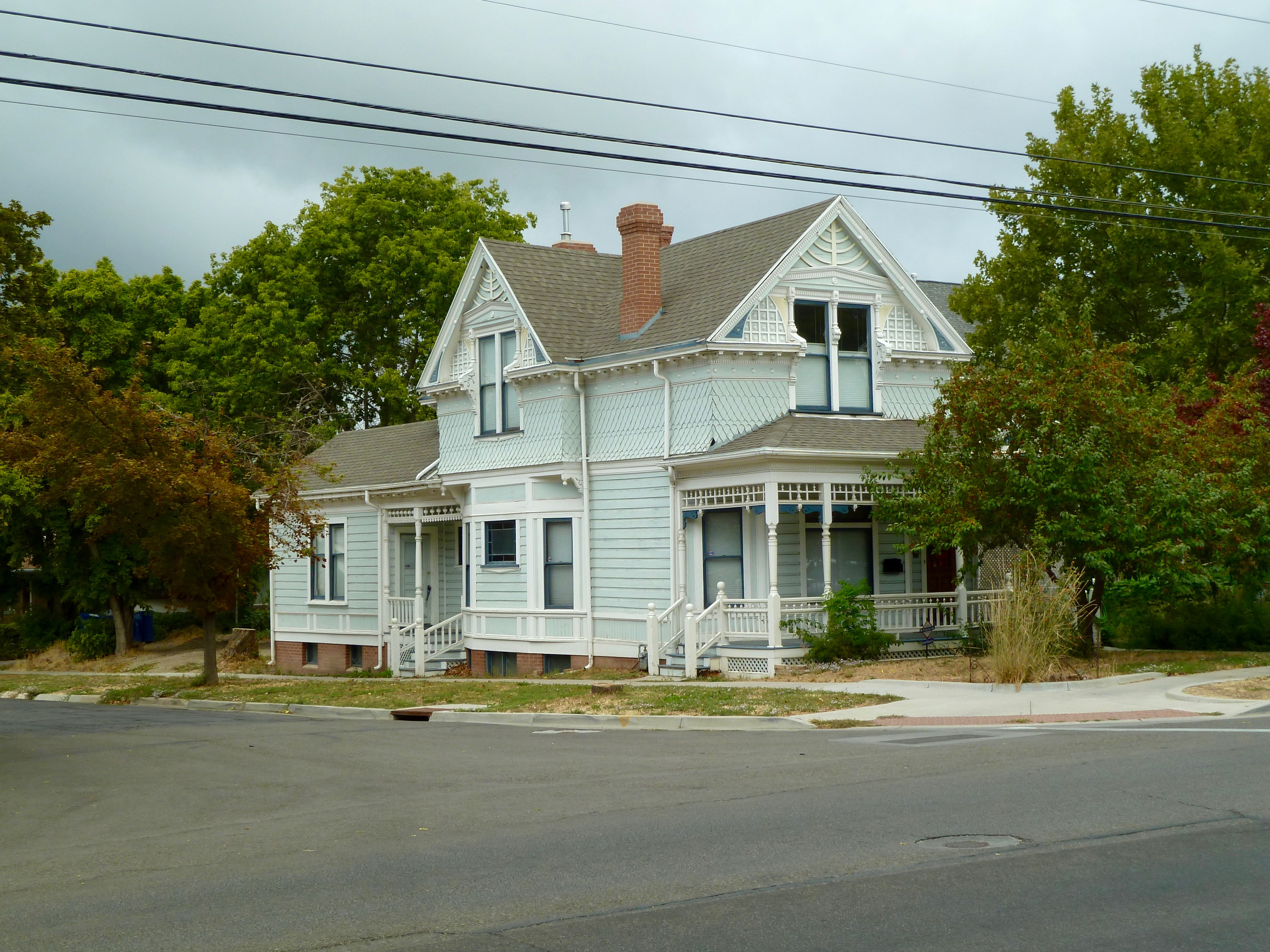
House for Elliott M. S. Best, Salt Lake City, Utah, 1893.

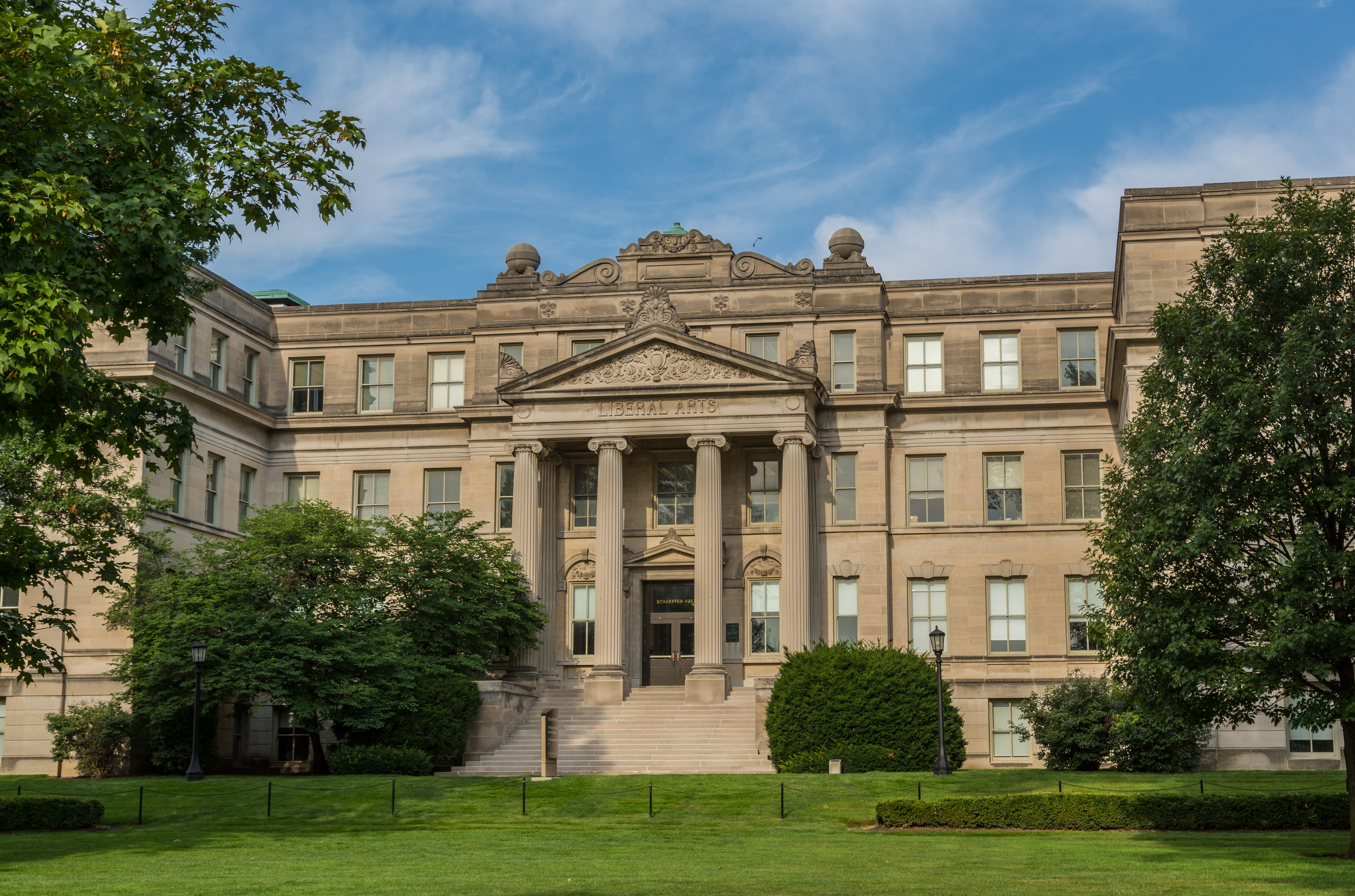
Schaeffer Hall, University of Iowa, Iowa City, Iowa, 1898-99.

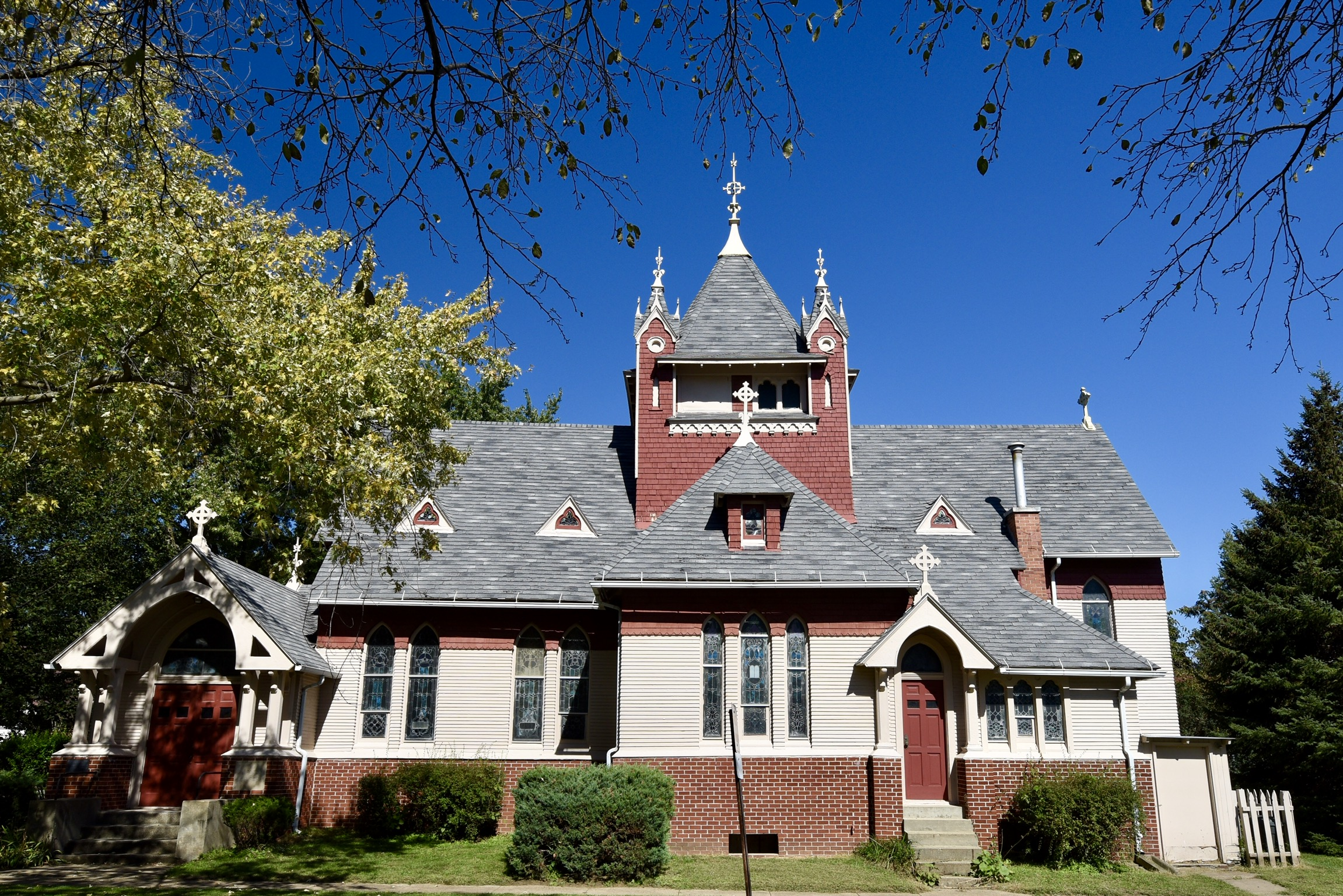
St. Paul's Episcopal Church, Harlan, Iowa, 1899-1900.

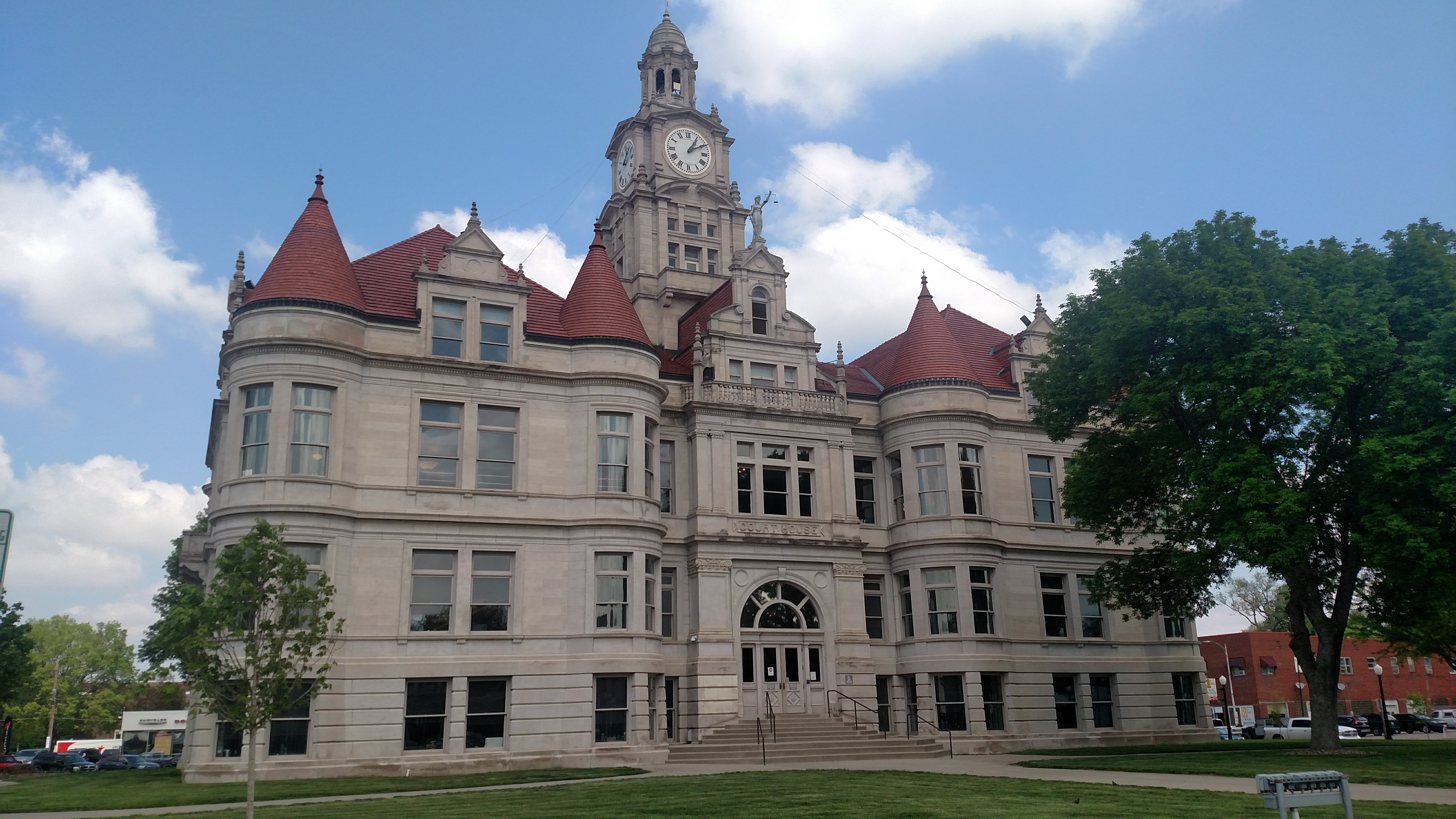
Dallas County Courthouse, Adel, Iowa, 1900-01.

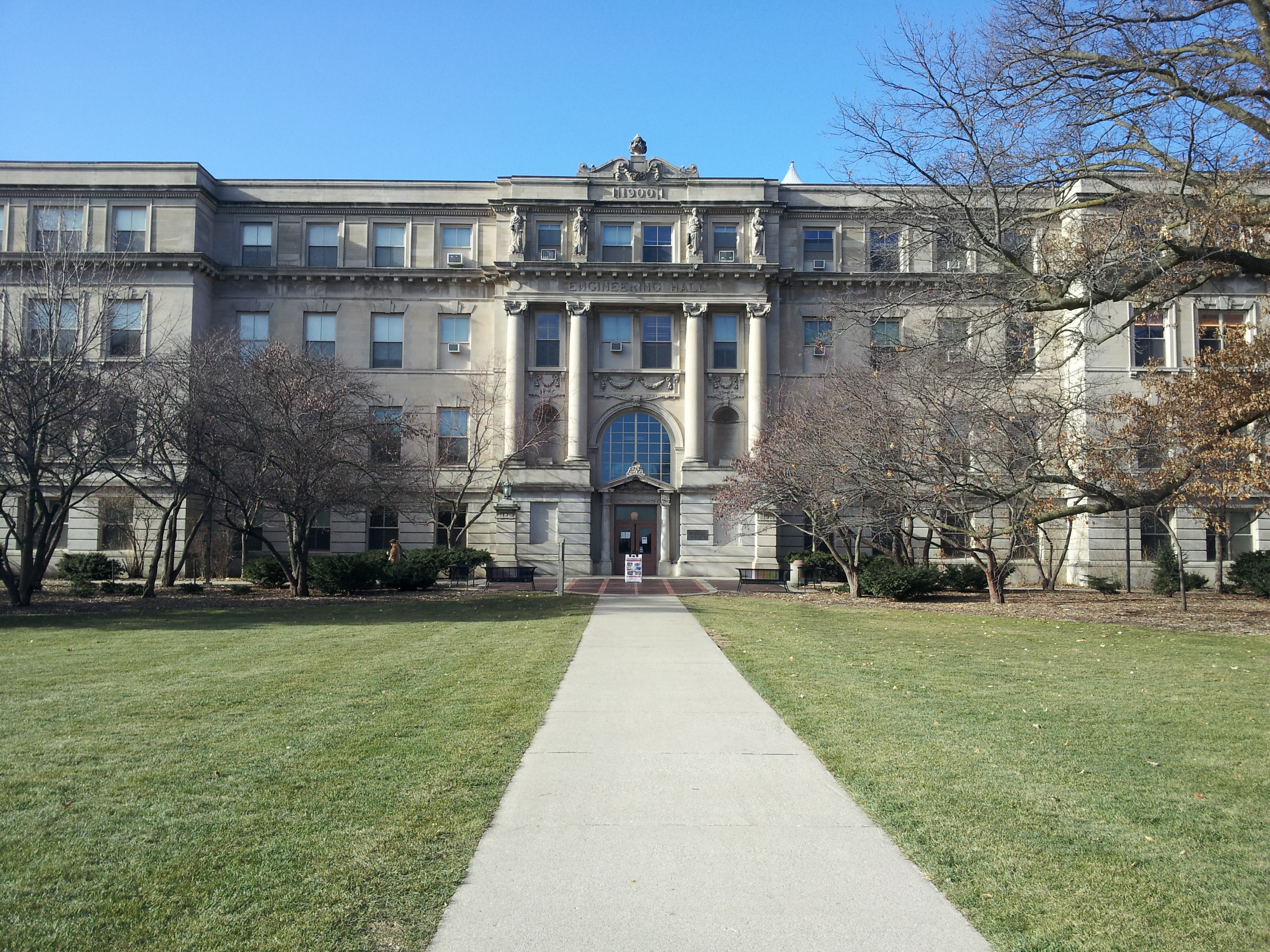
Marston Hall, Iowa State University, Ames, Iowa, 1900-03.

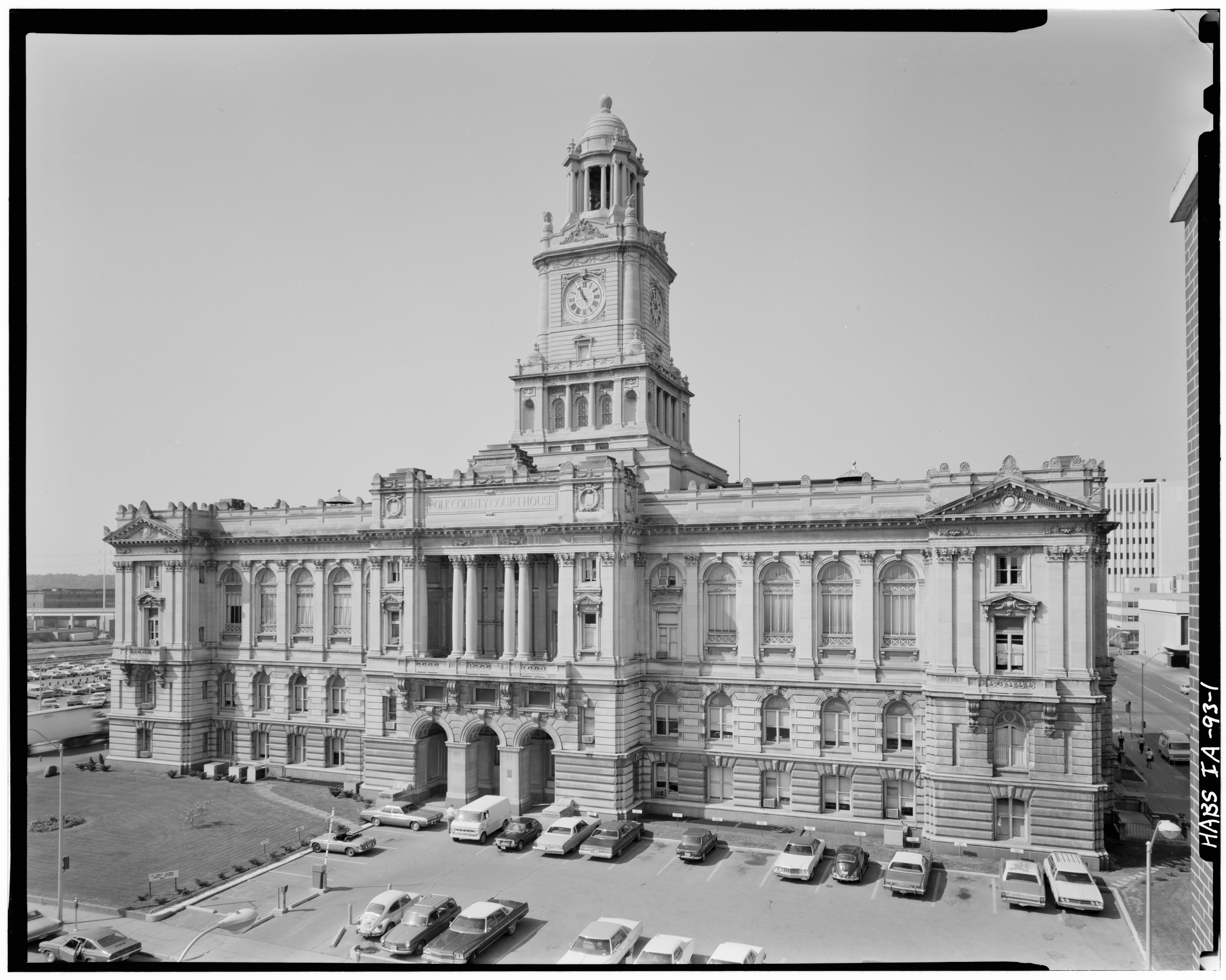
Polk County Courthouse, Des Moines, Iowa, 1902-06.

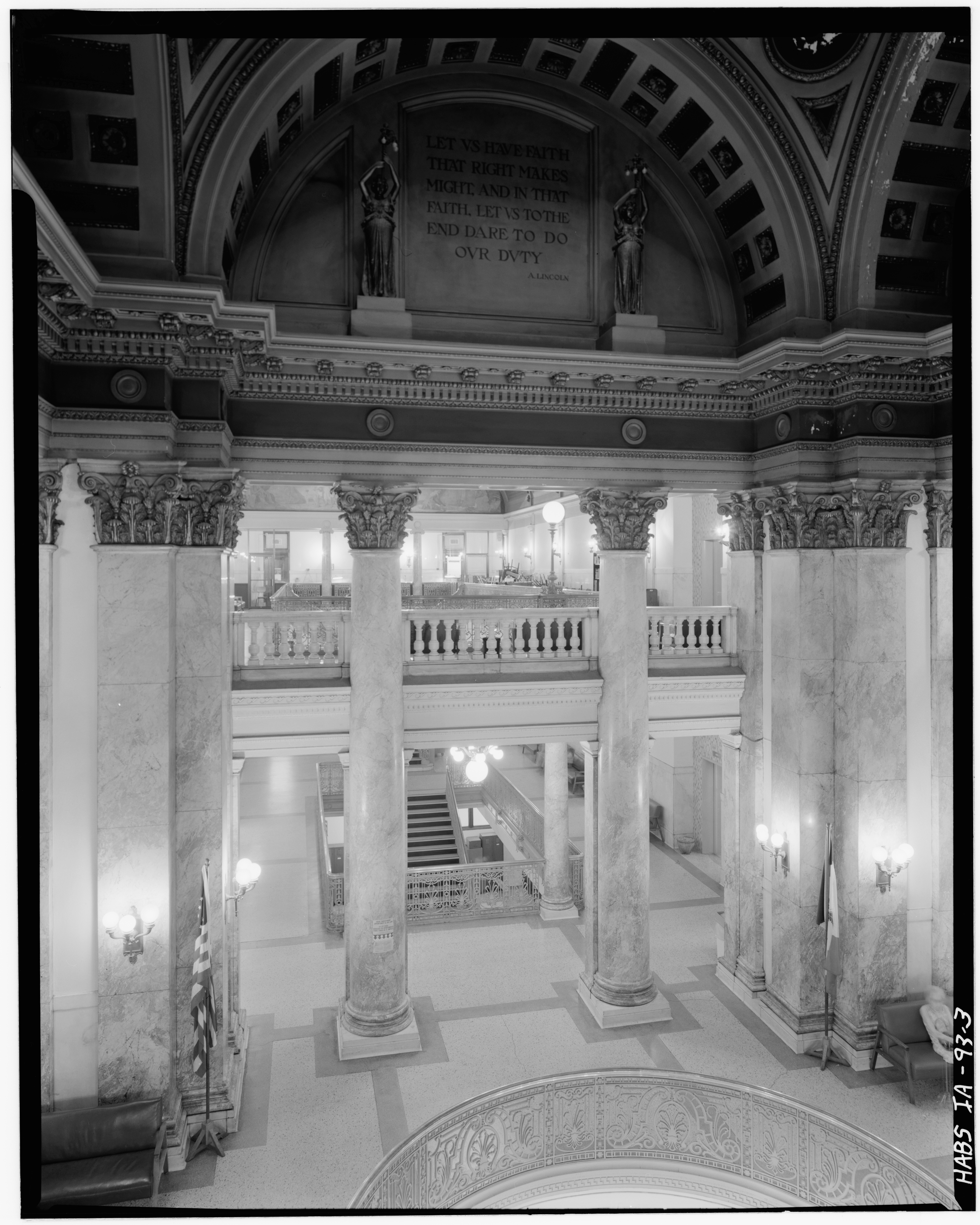
Interior view of the Polk County Courthouse, Des Moines, Iowa, 1902-06.

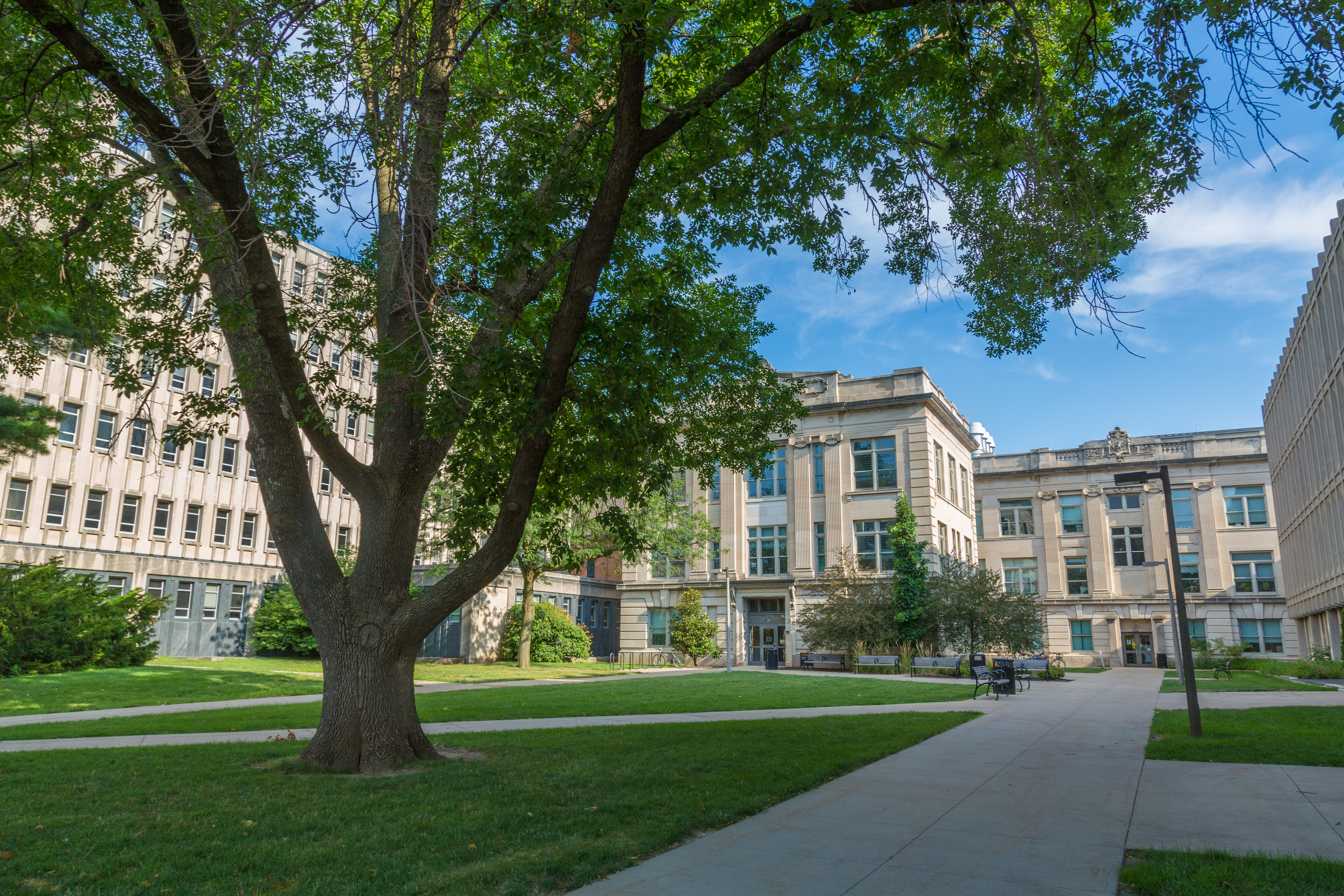
Sciences Library (center) and Biology Building (right), University of Iowa, Iowa City, Iowa, 1902-04.

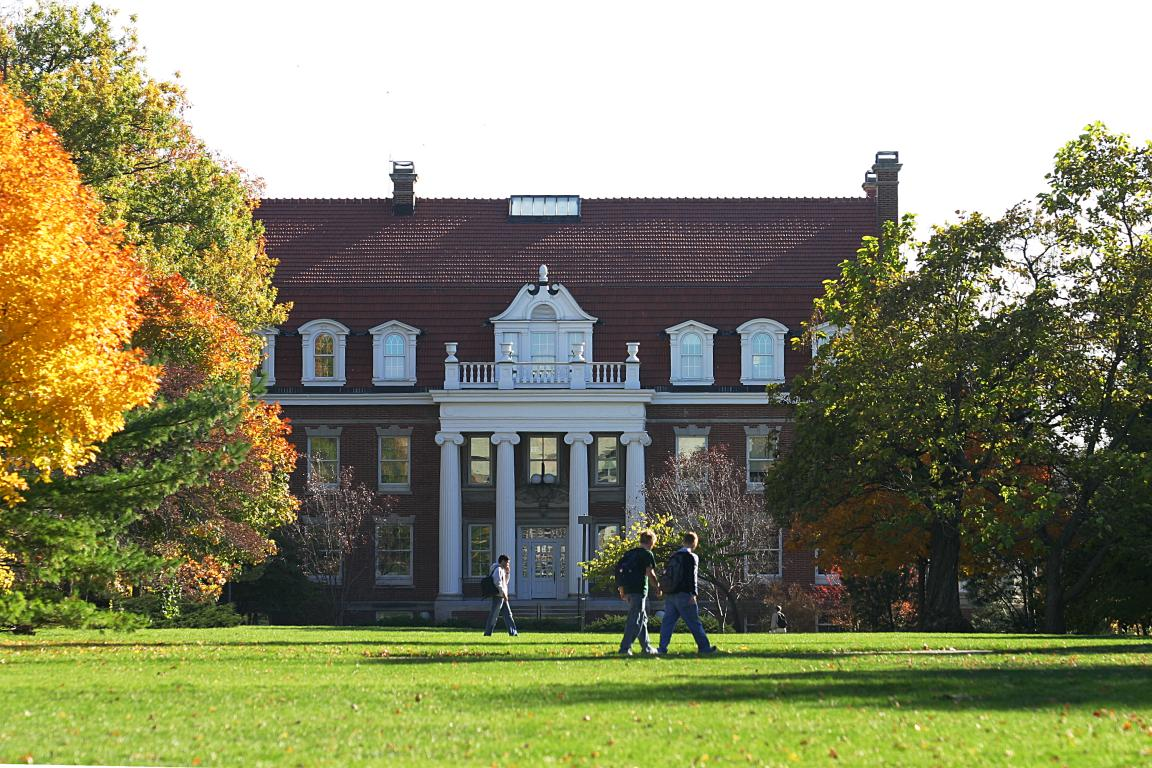
Alumni Hall, Iowa State University, Ames, Iowa, 1904-07.

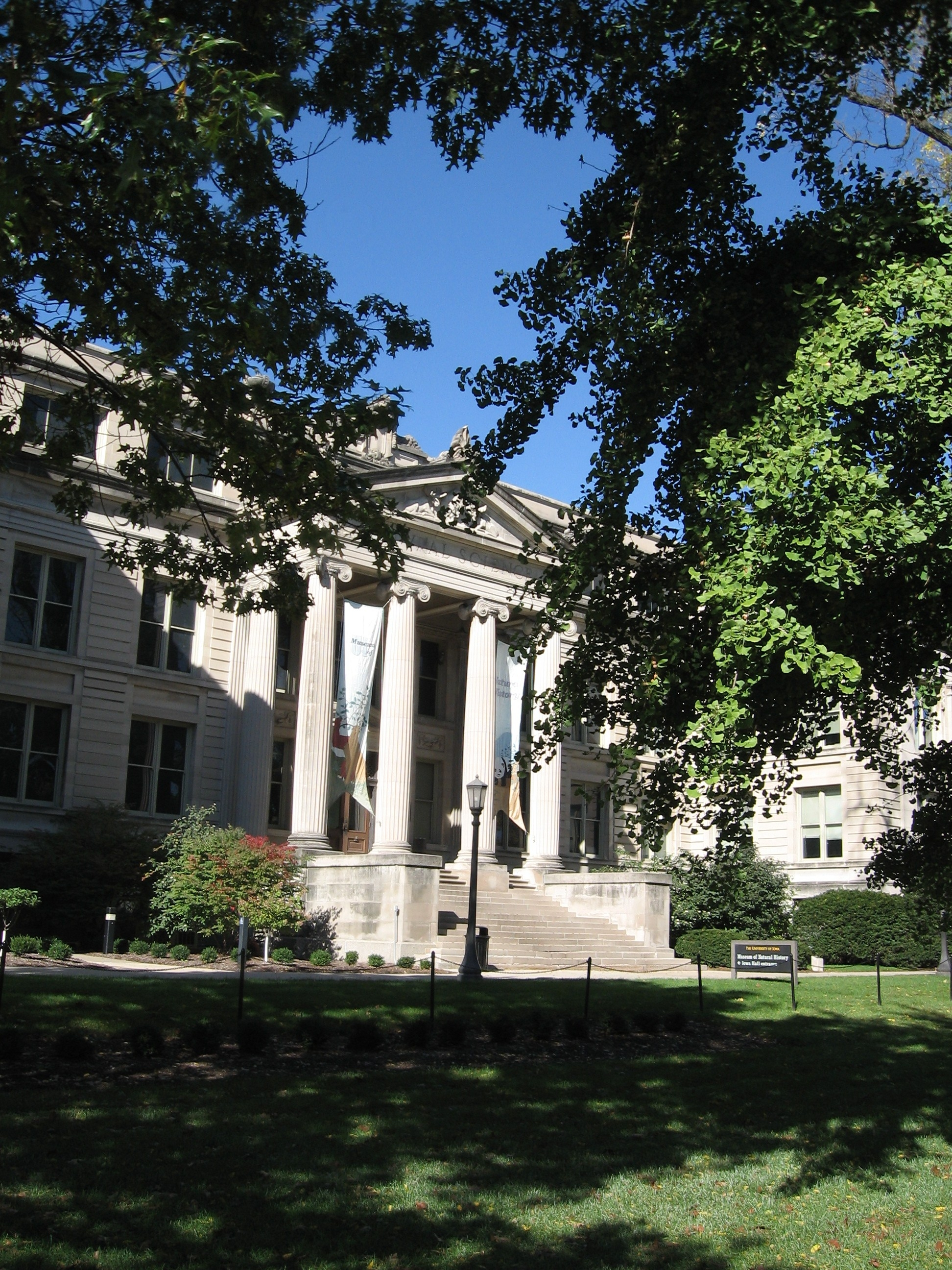
Macbride Hall, University of Iowa, Iowa City, Iowa, 1904-08.

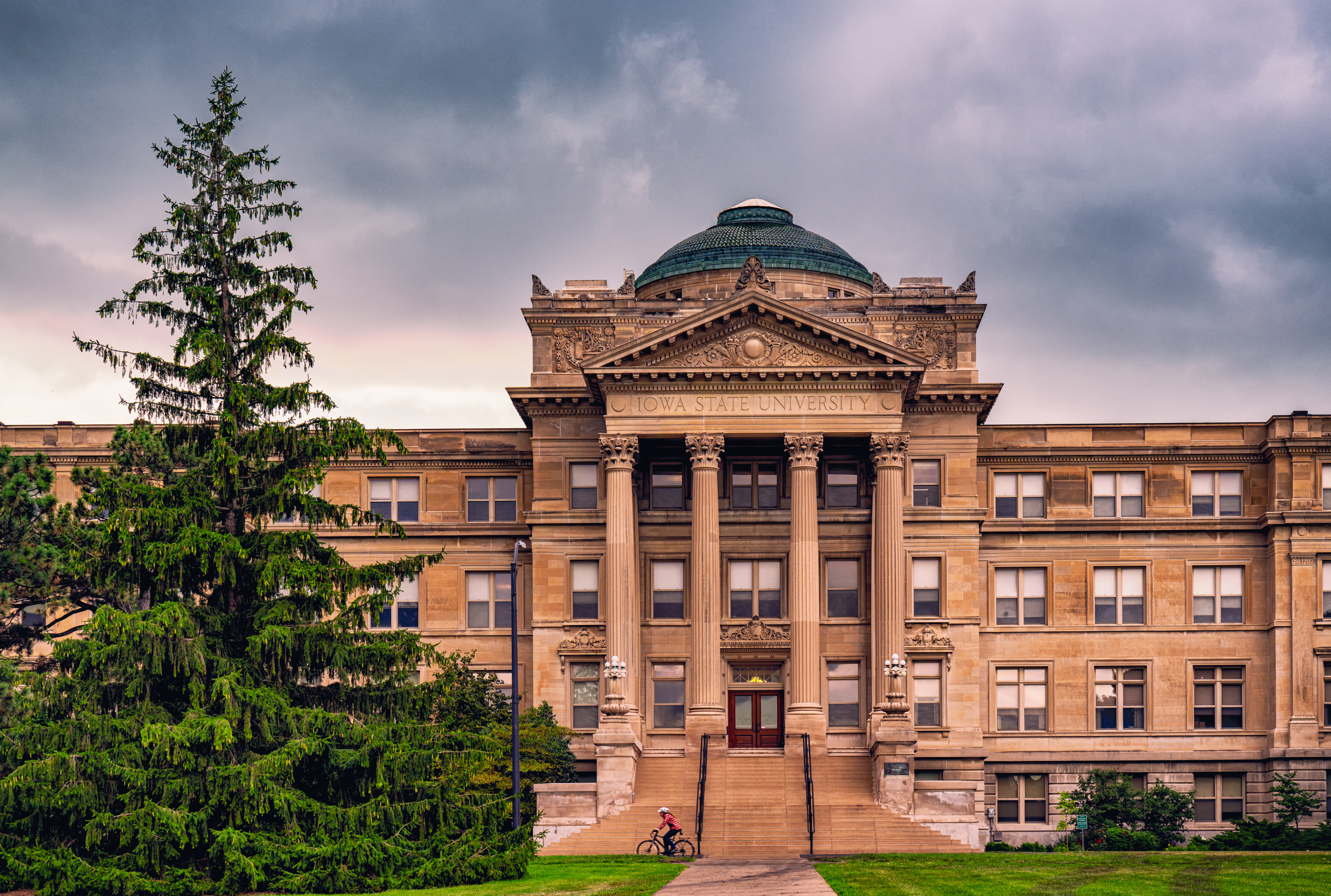
Beardshear Hall, Iowa State University, Ames, Iowa, 1906-08.

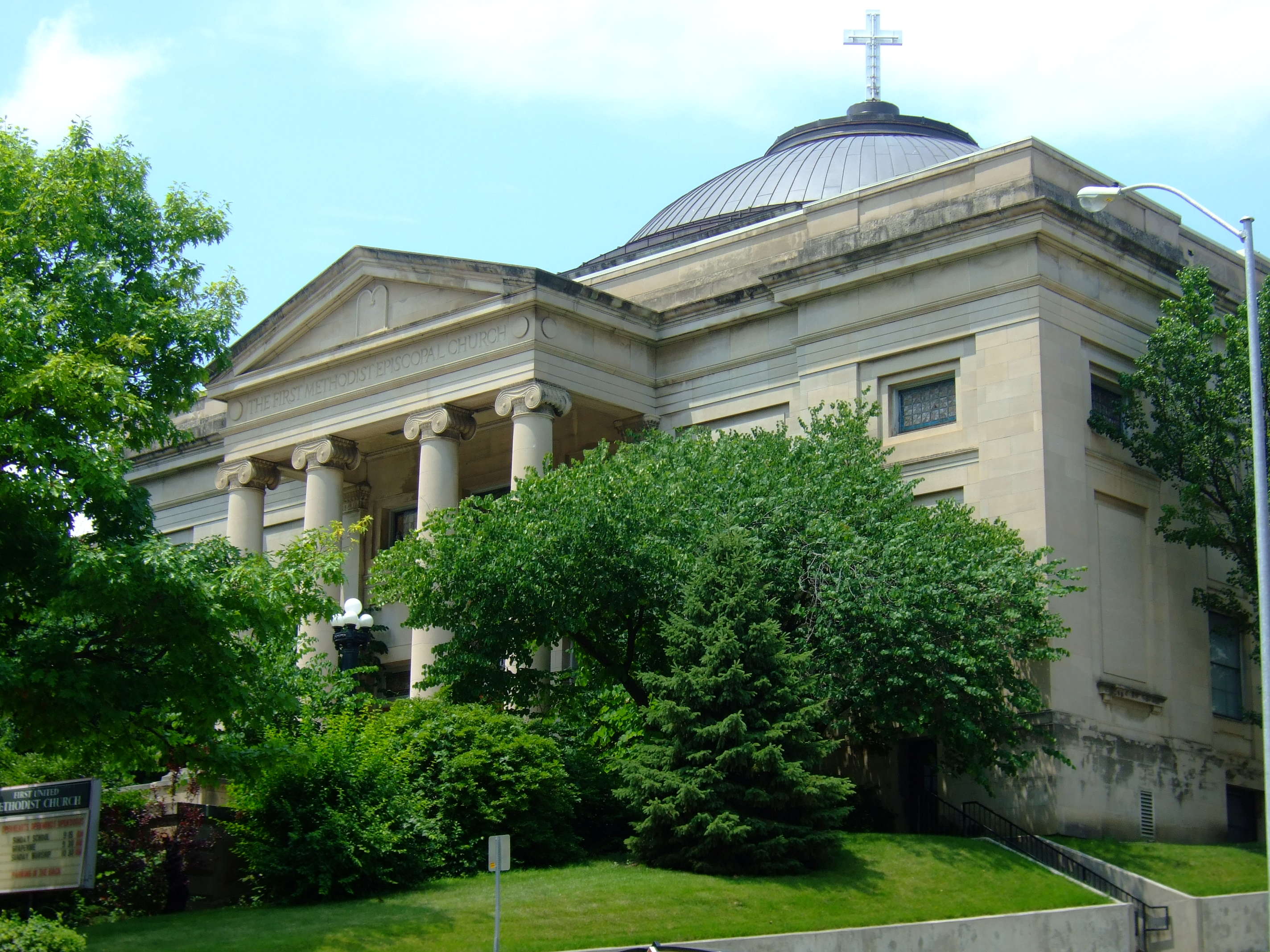
First United Methodist Church, Des Moines, Iowa, 1906-08.

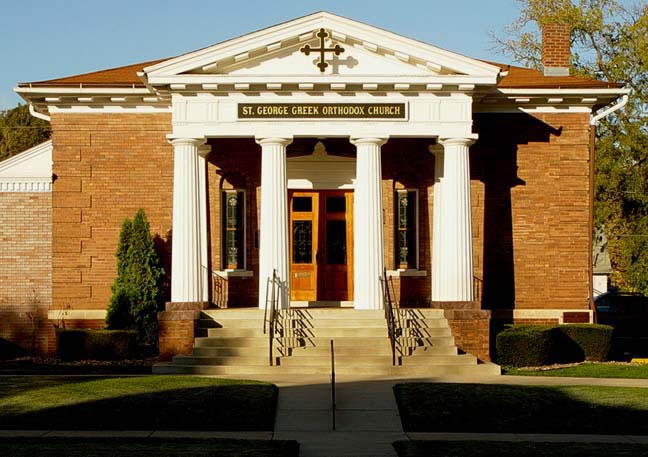
Greek Orthodox Church of St. George, Des Moines, Iowa, 1906.

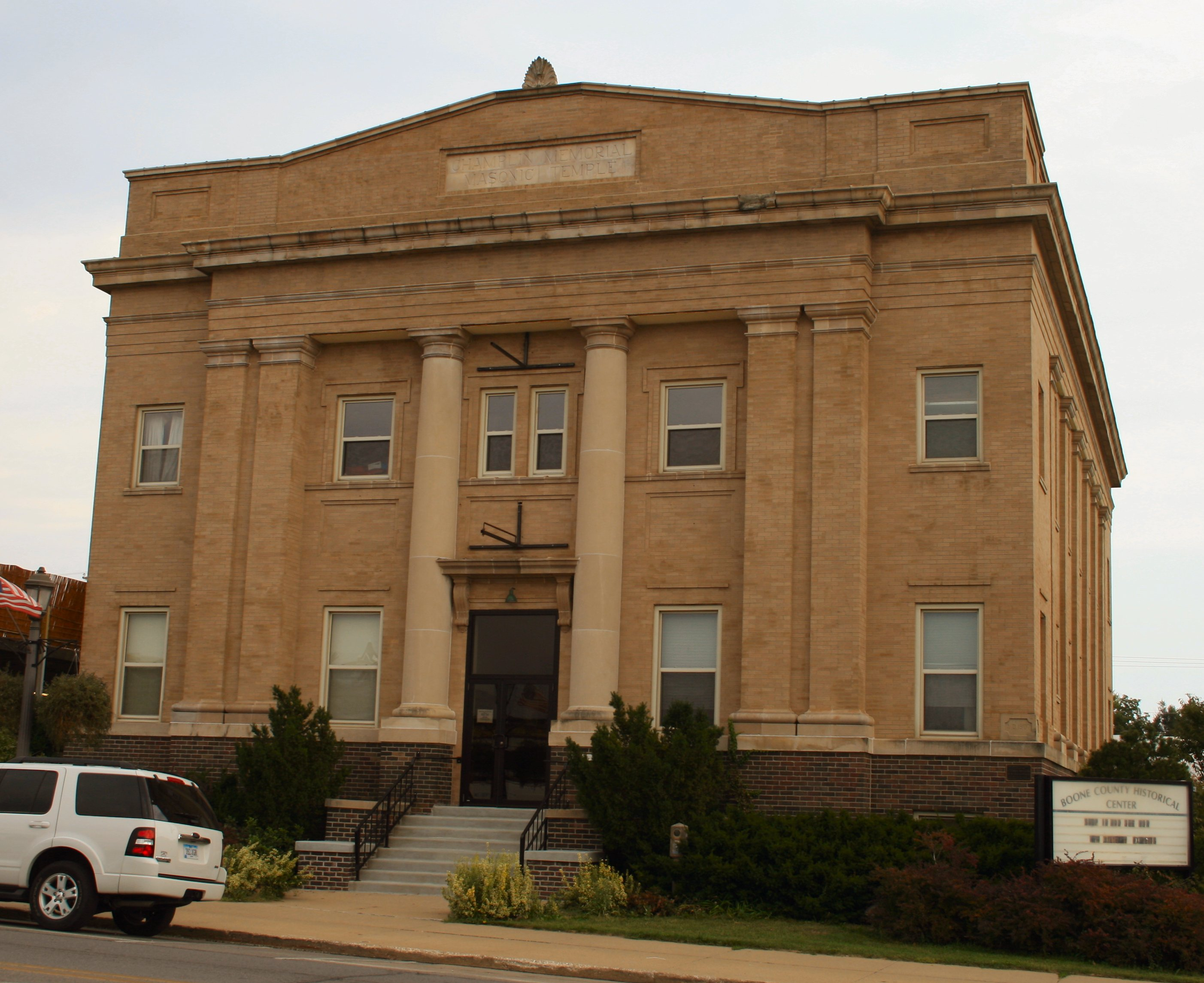
Champlin Memorial Masonic Temple, Boone, Iowa, 1907.

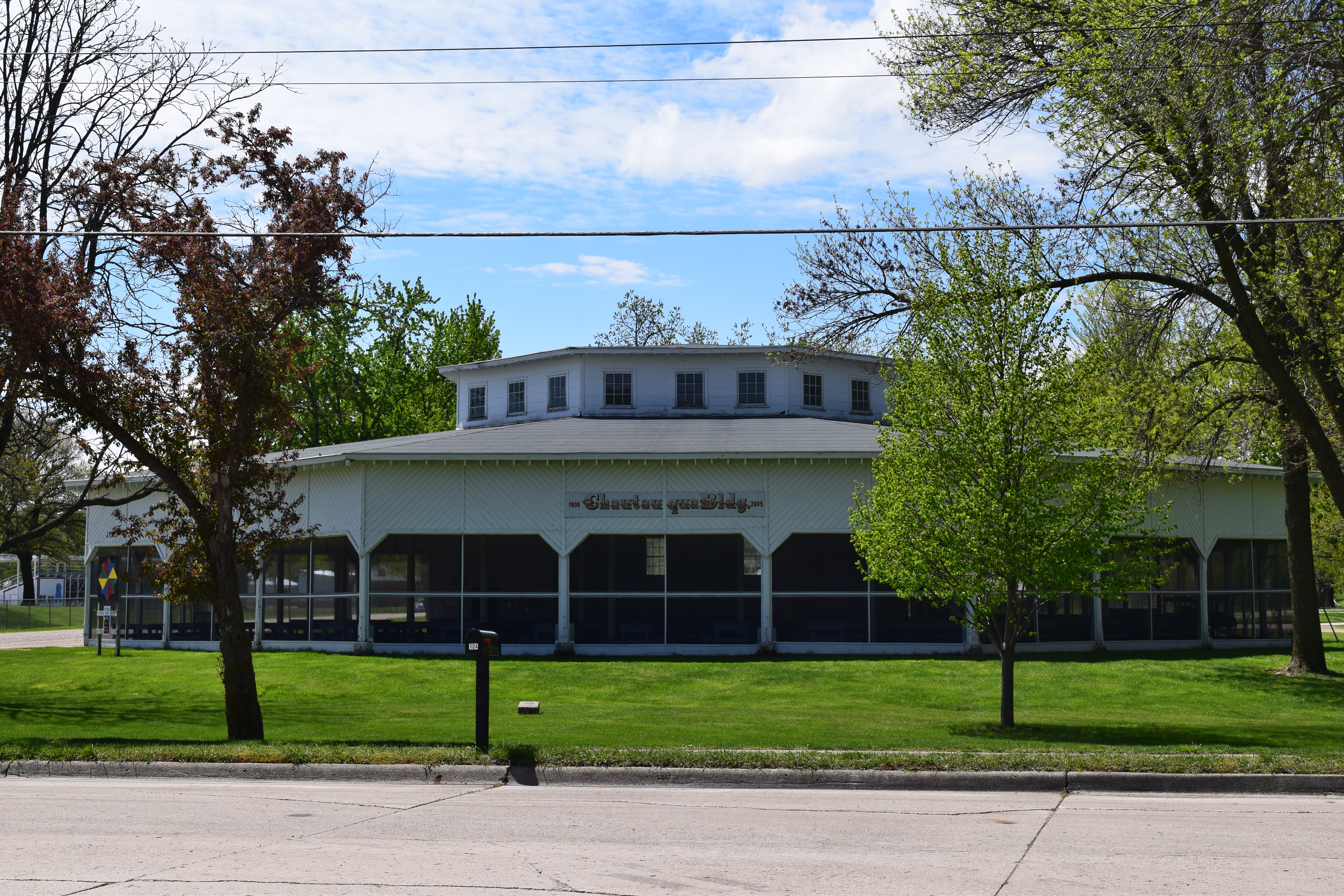
Chautauqua Auditorium, Chautauqua Park, Sac City, Iowa, 1908.

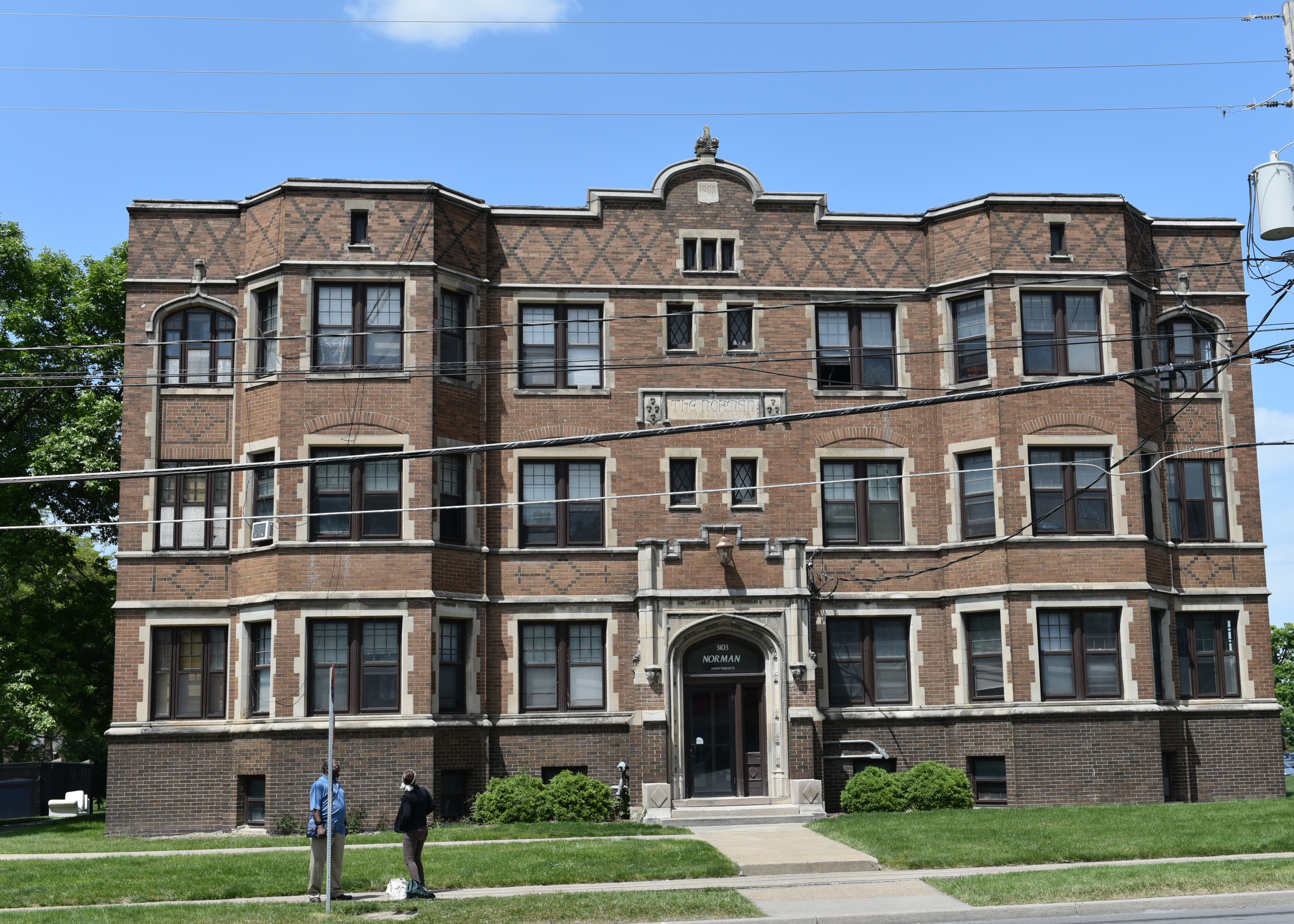
Norman Apartment Building, Des Moines, Iowa, 1908.

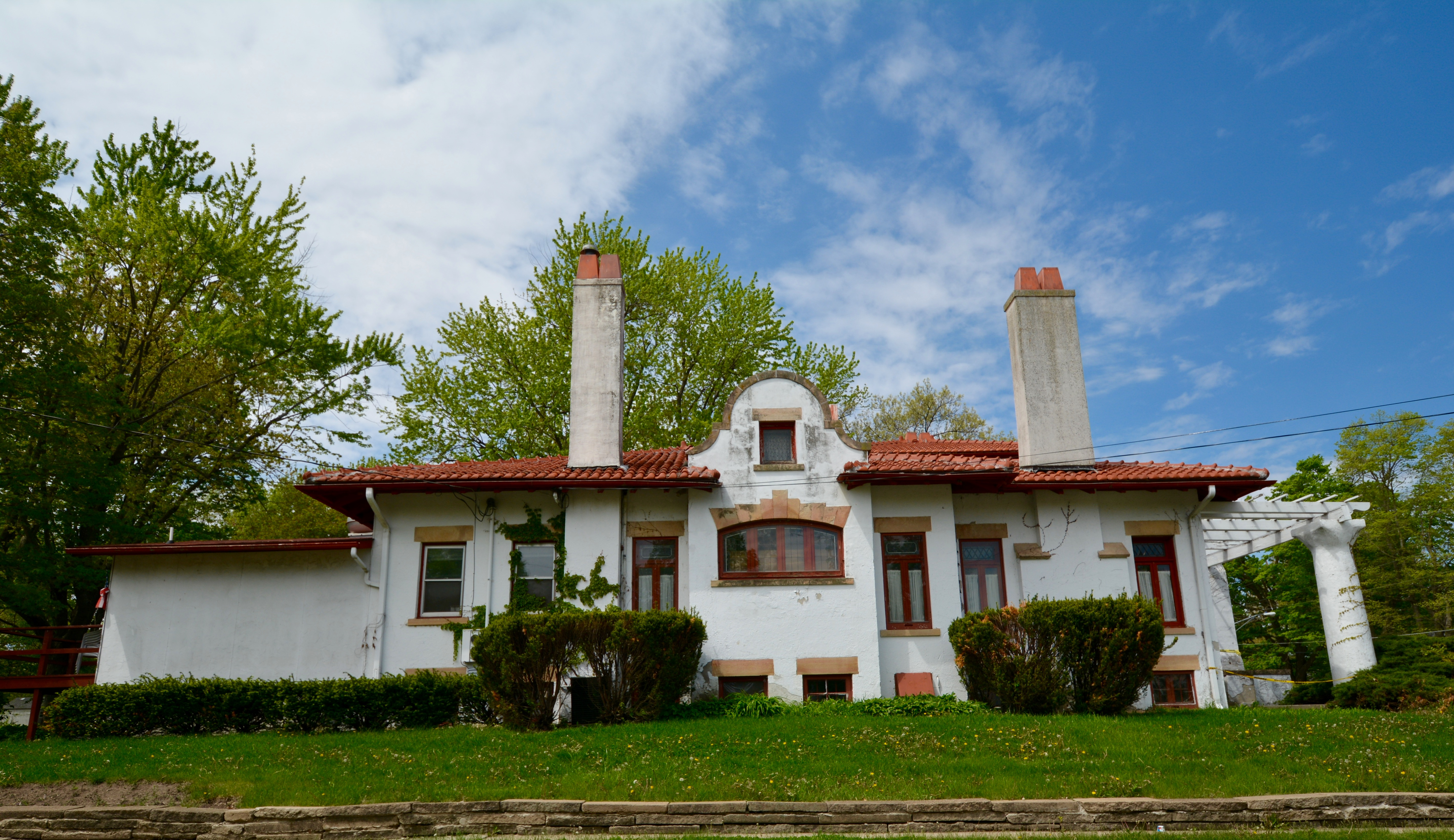
House for August H. Bergman, Newton, Iowa, 1909.

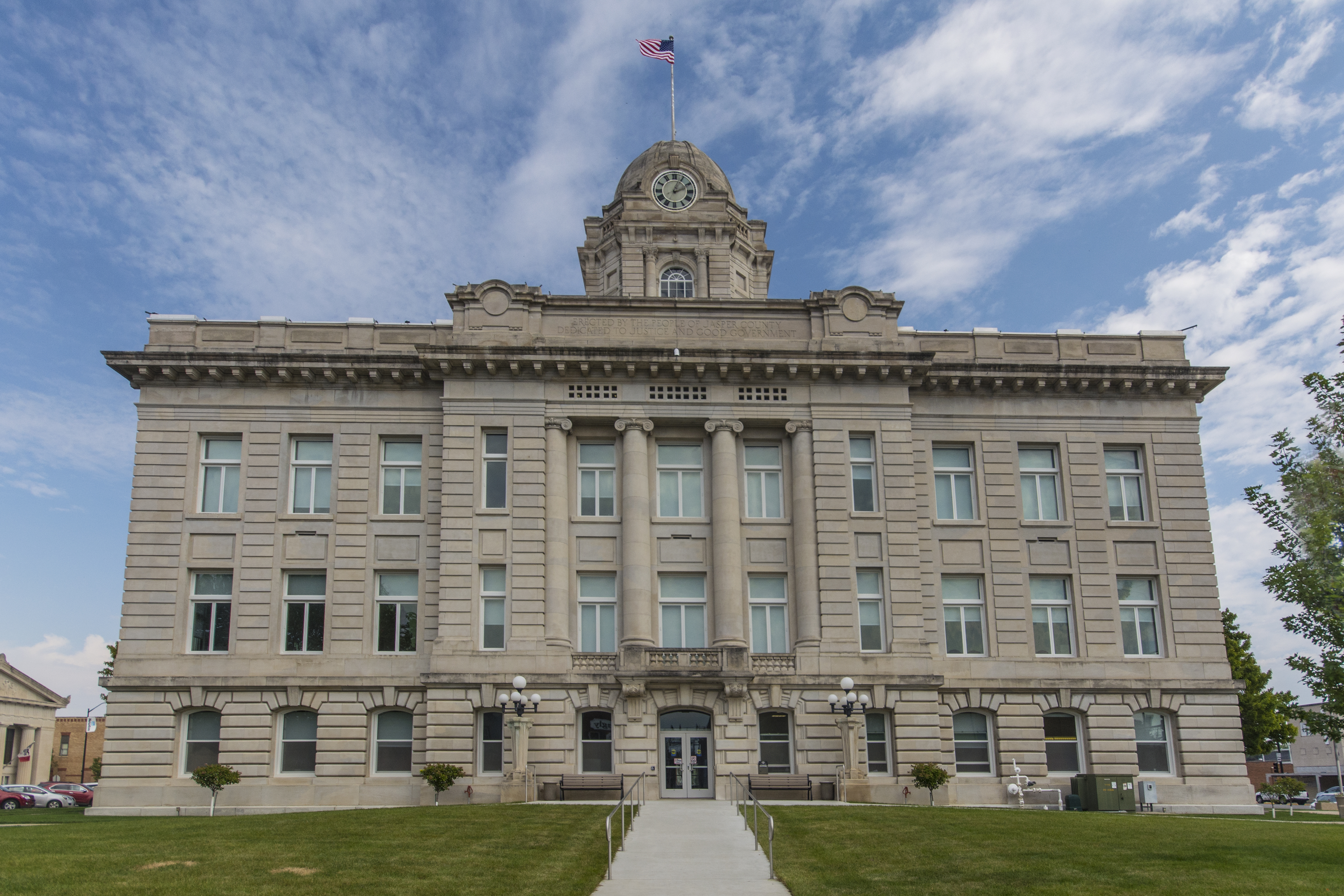
Jasper County Courthouse, Newton, Iowa, 1909-11.

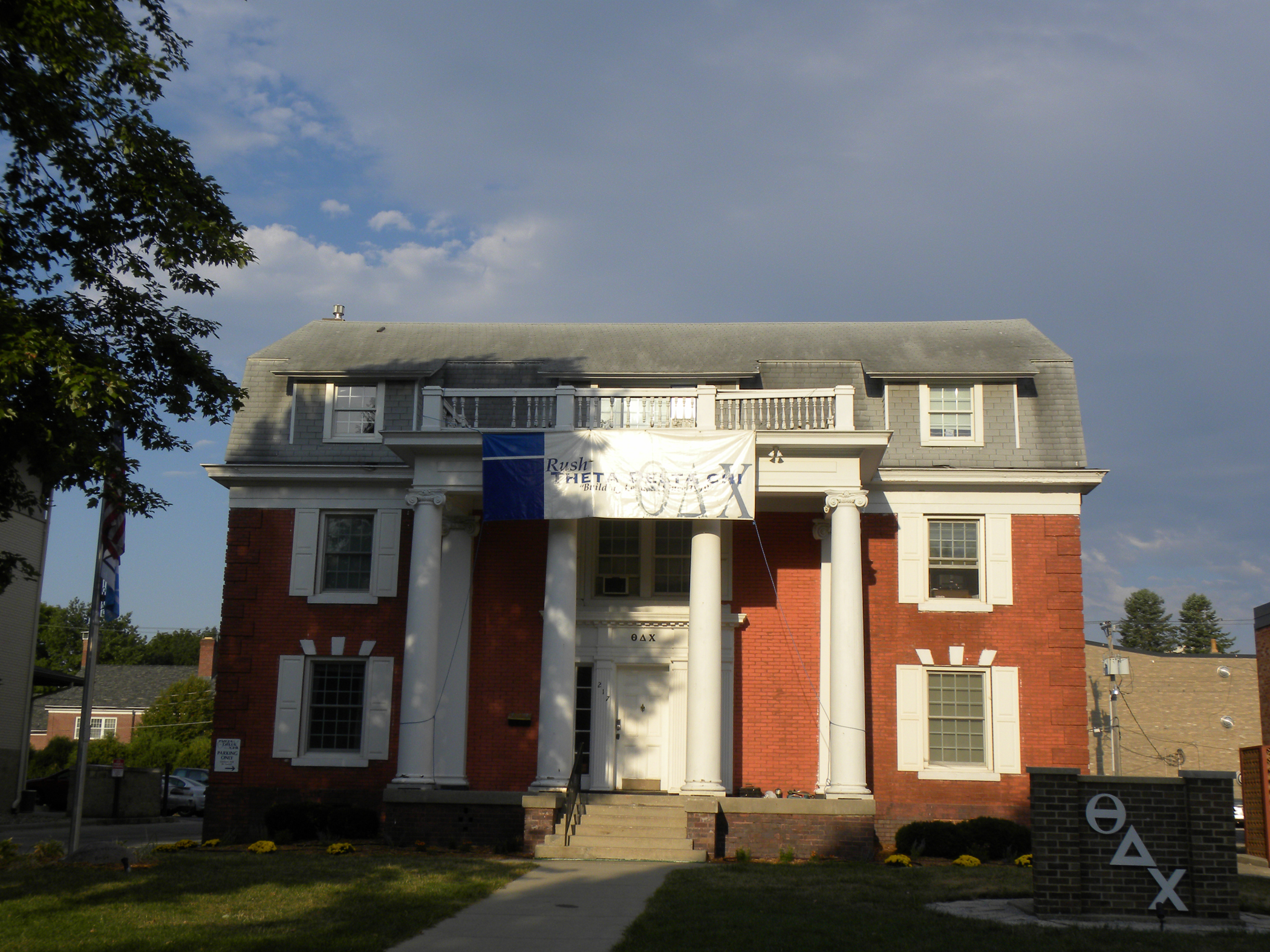
Colonials Club House, Ames, Iowa, 1910.

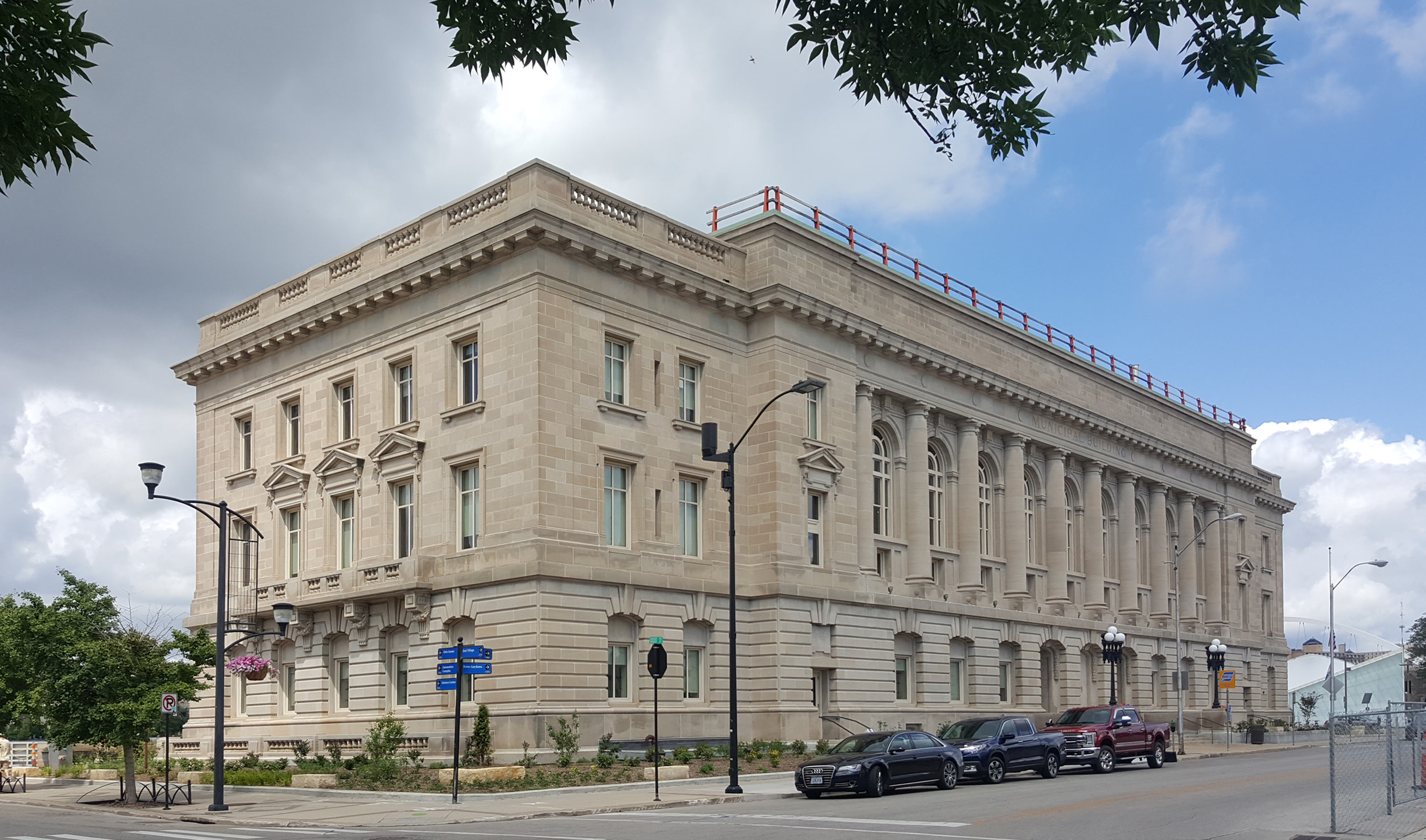
Des Moines City Hall, Des Moines, Iowa, 1910-12.

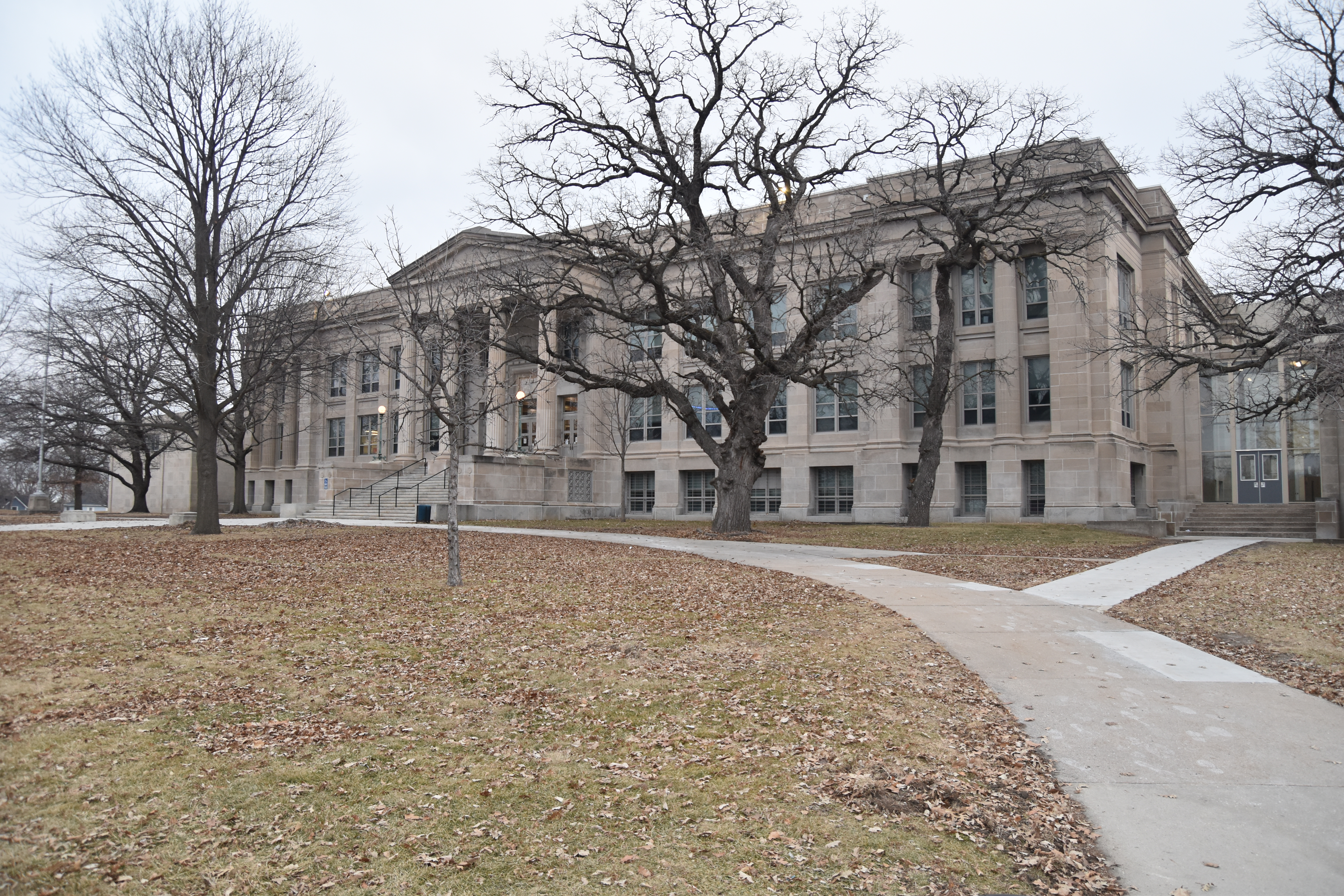
East High School, Des Moines, Iowa, 1910-11.

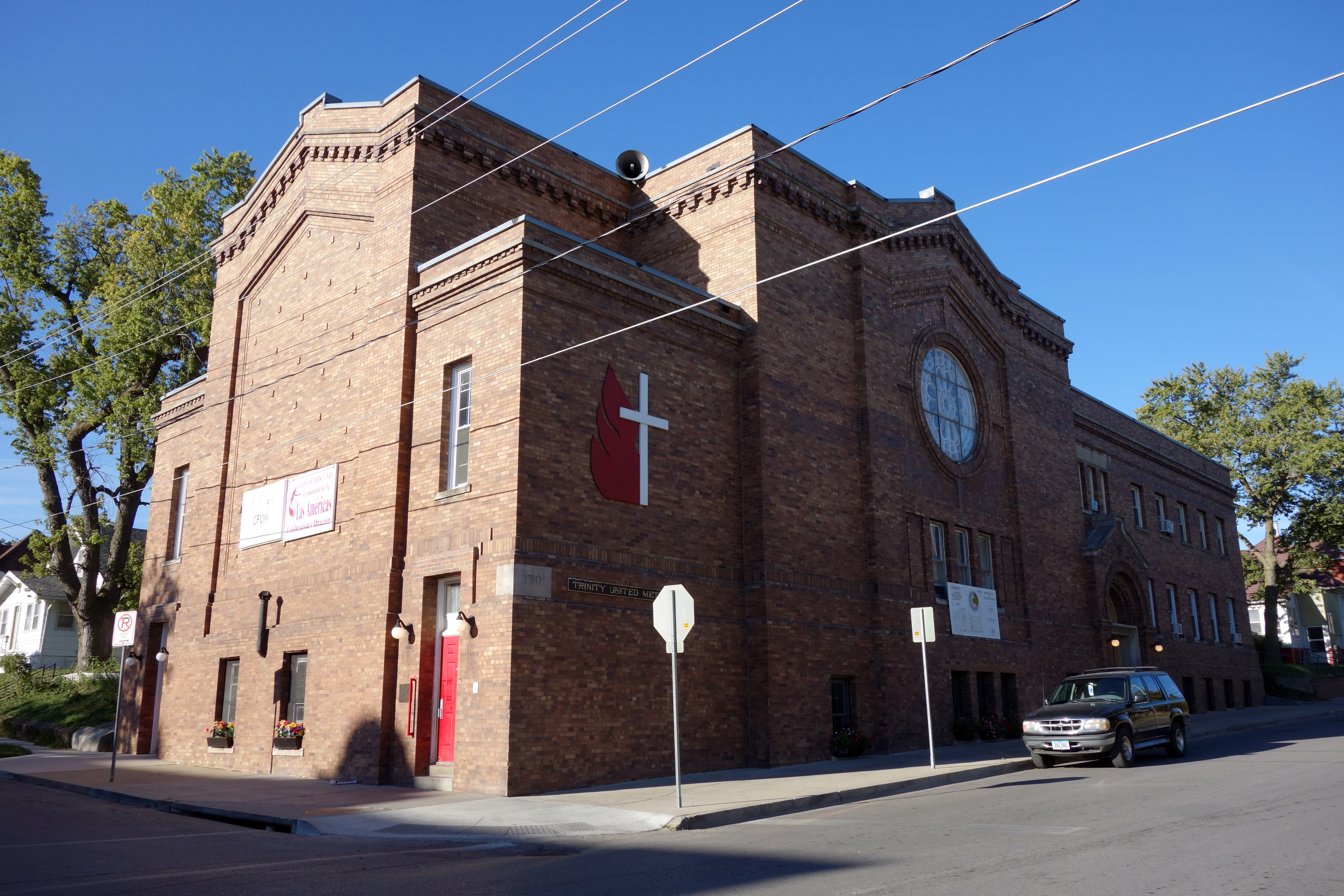
Trinity United Methodist Church, Des Moines, Iowa, 1911.

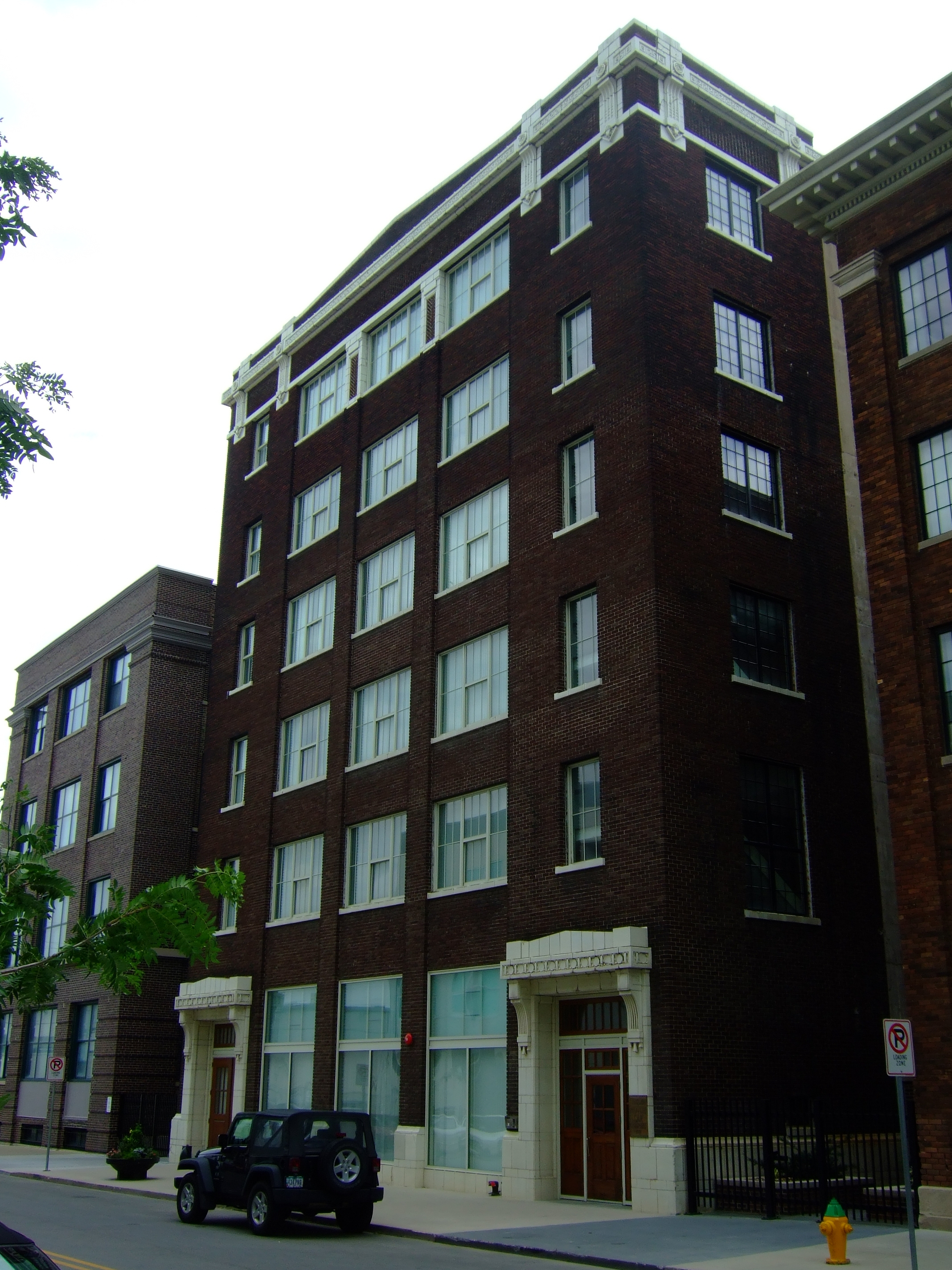
Herring Motor Car Company Building, Des Moines, Iowa, 1912-13.

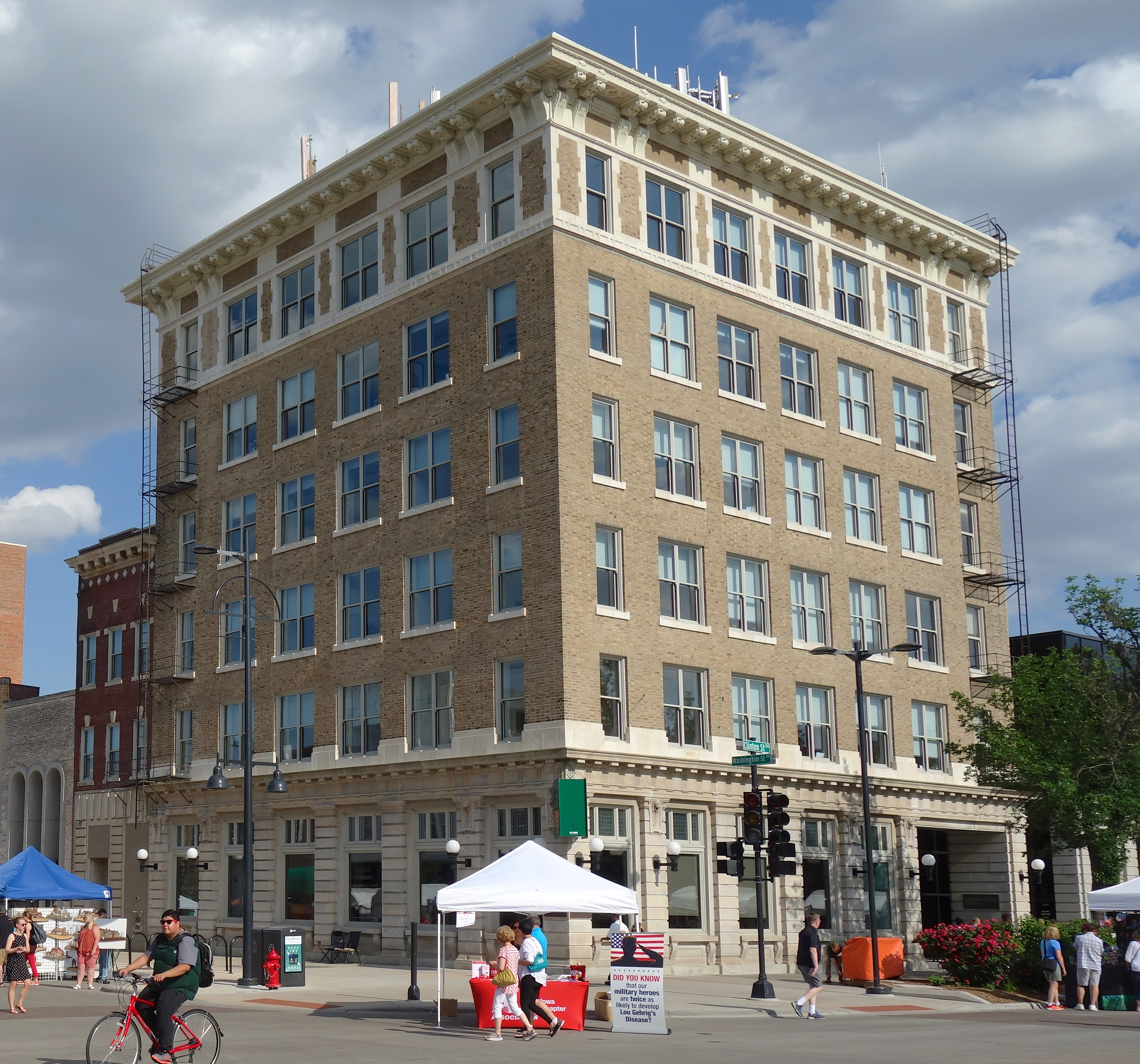
Johnson County Savings Bank Building, Iowa City, Iowa, 1912.

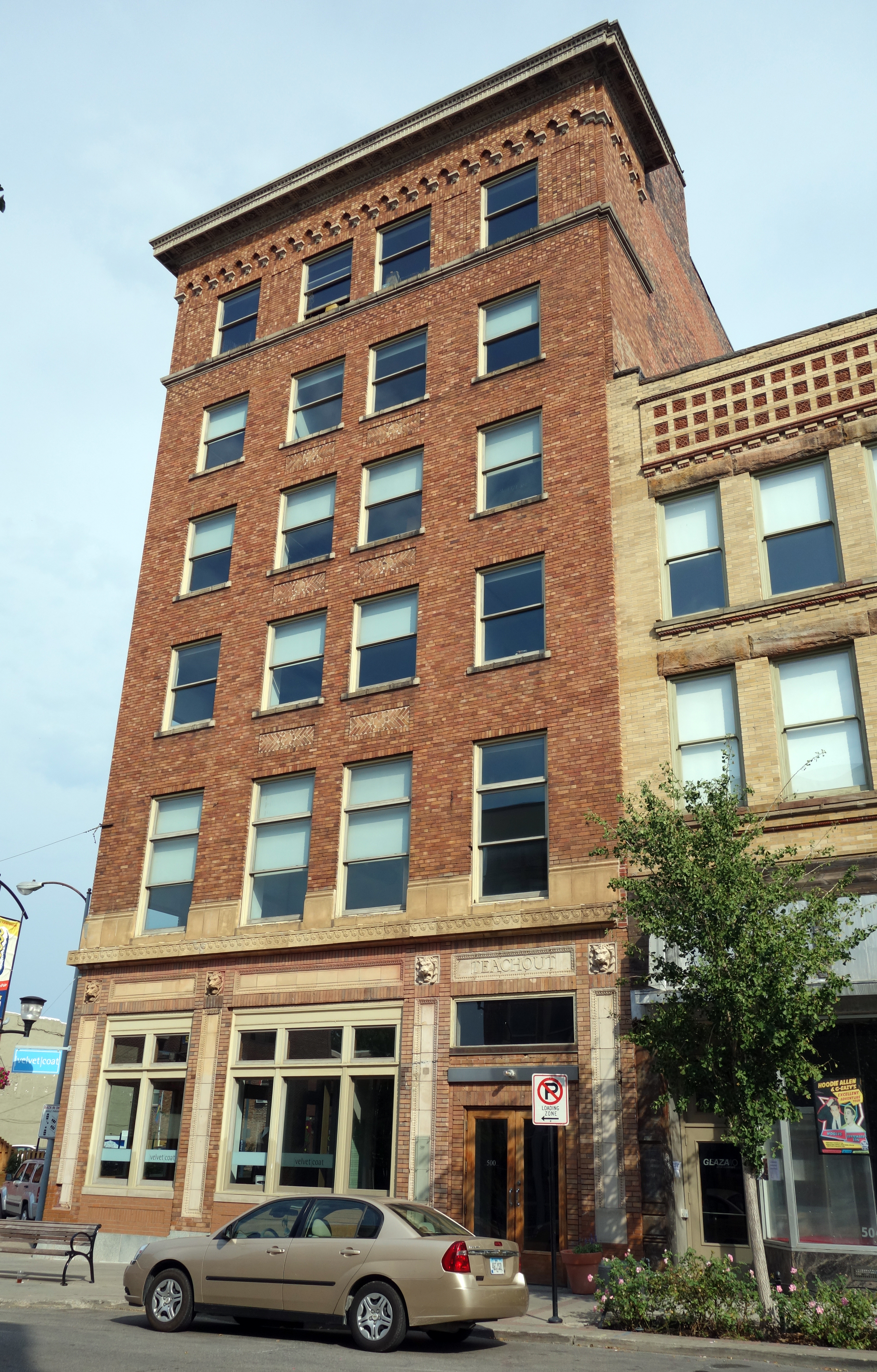
Teachout Building, Des Moines, Iowa, 1912.

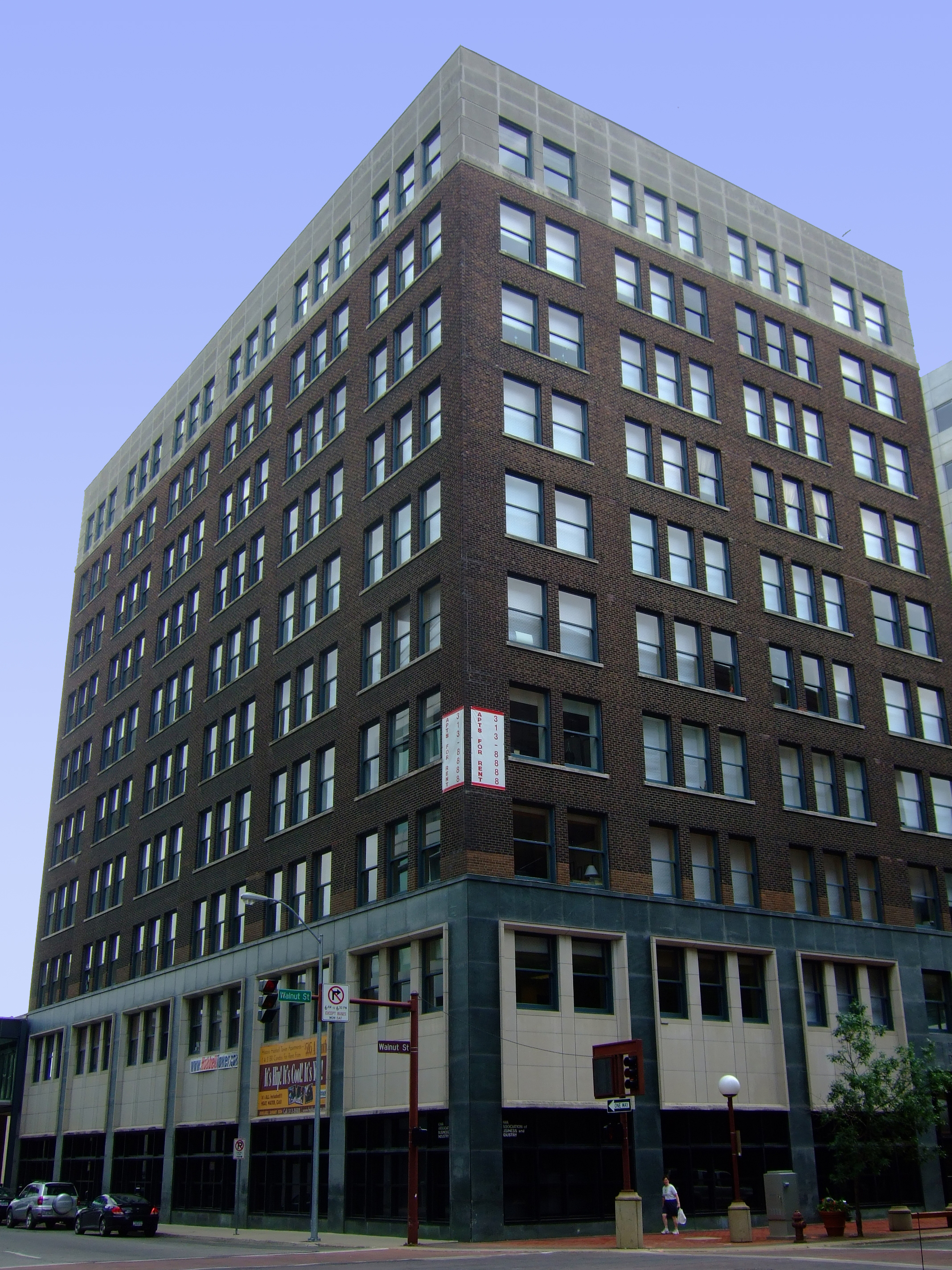
Hubbell Building, Des Moines, Iowa, 1913.

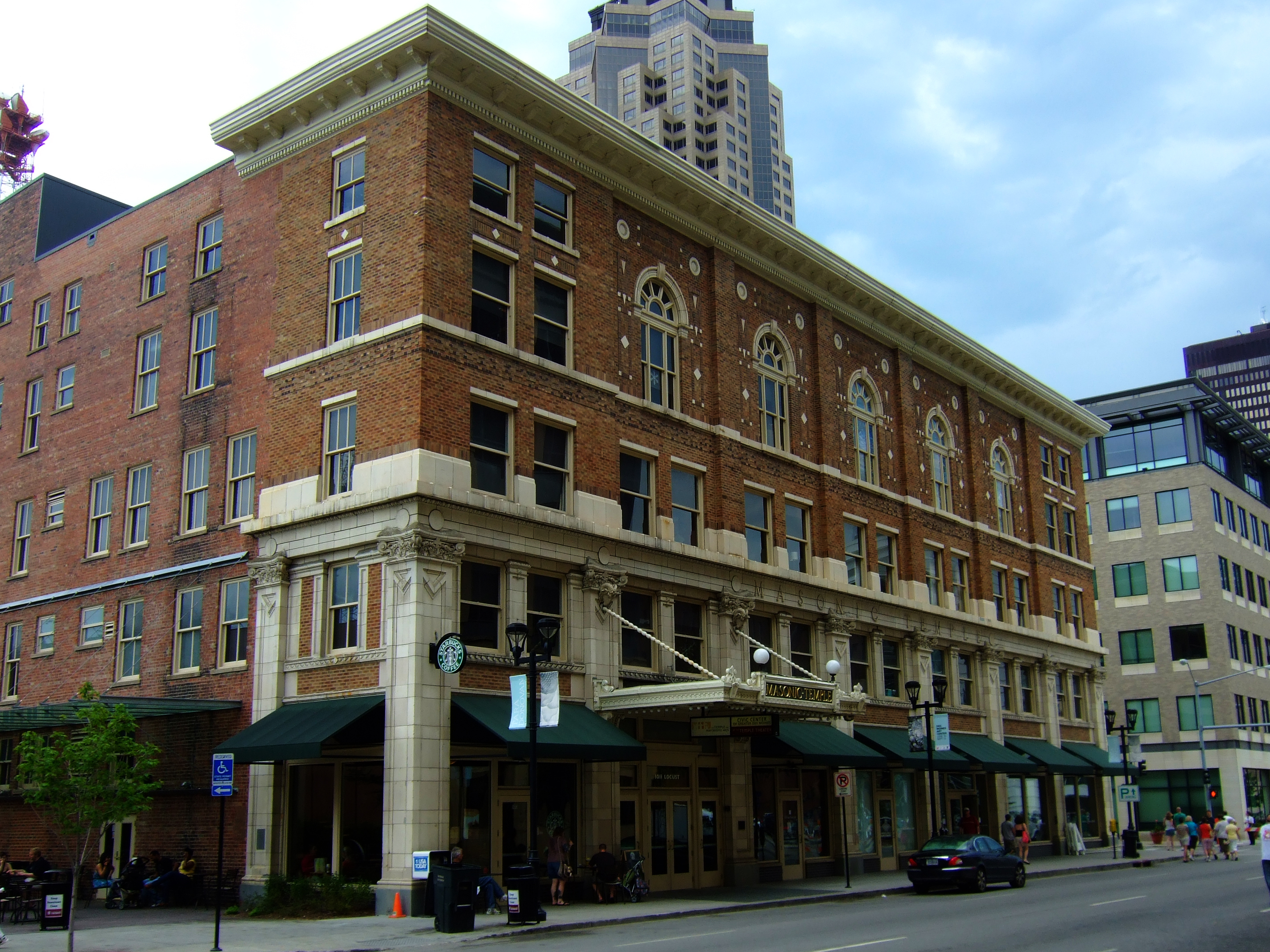
Masonic Temple, Des Moines, Iowa, 1913.

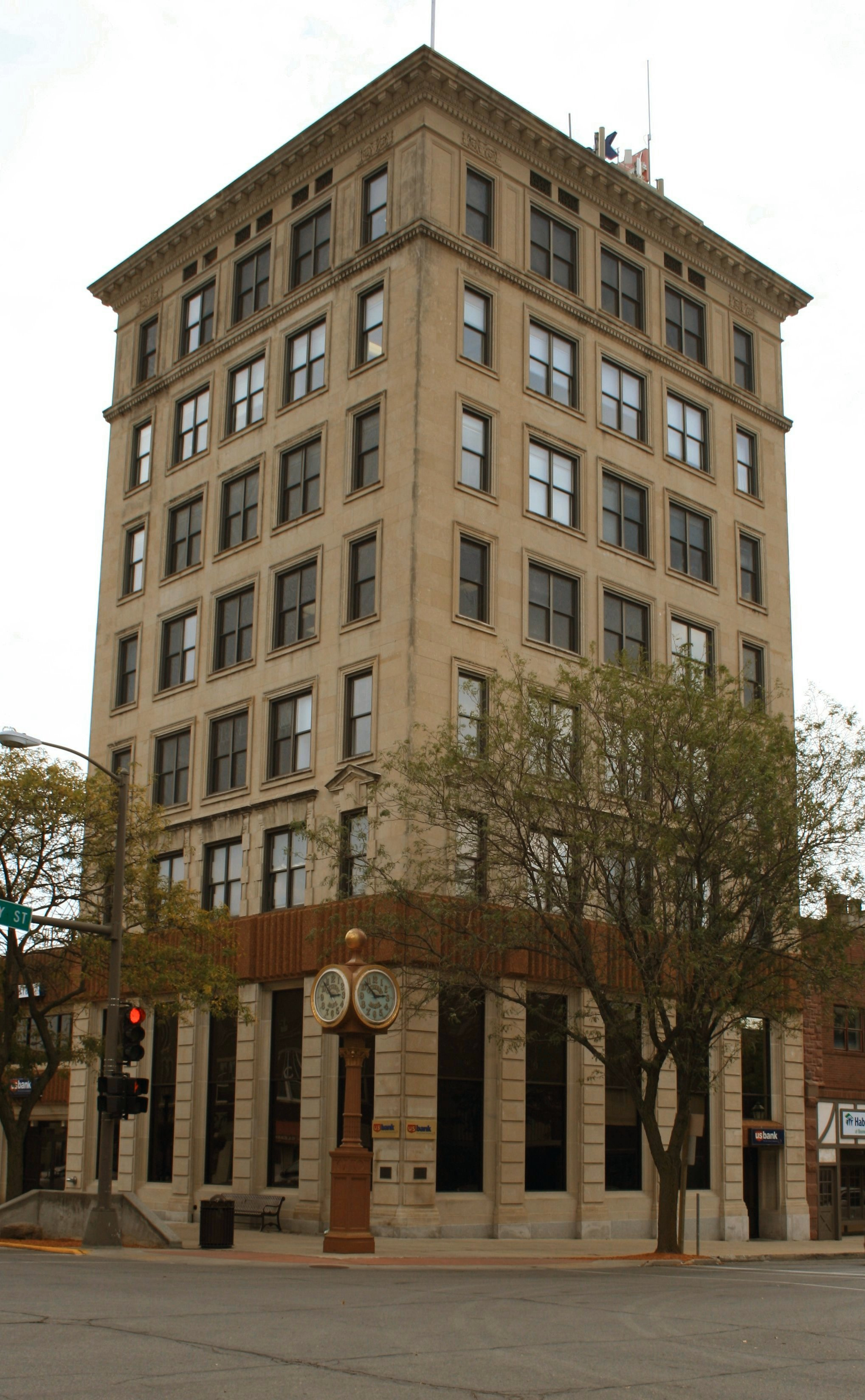
First National Bank Building, Boone, Iowa, 1915-16.

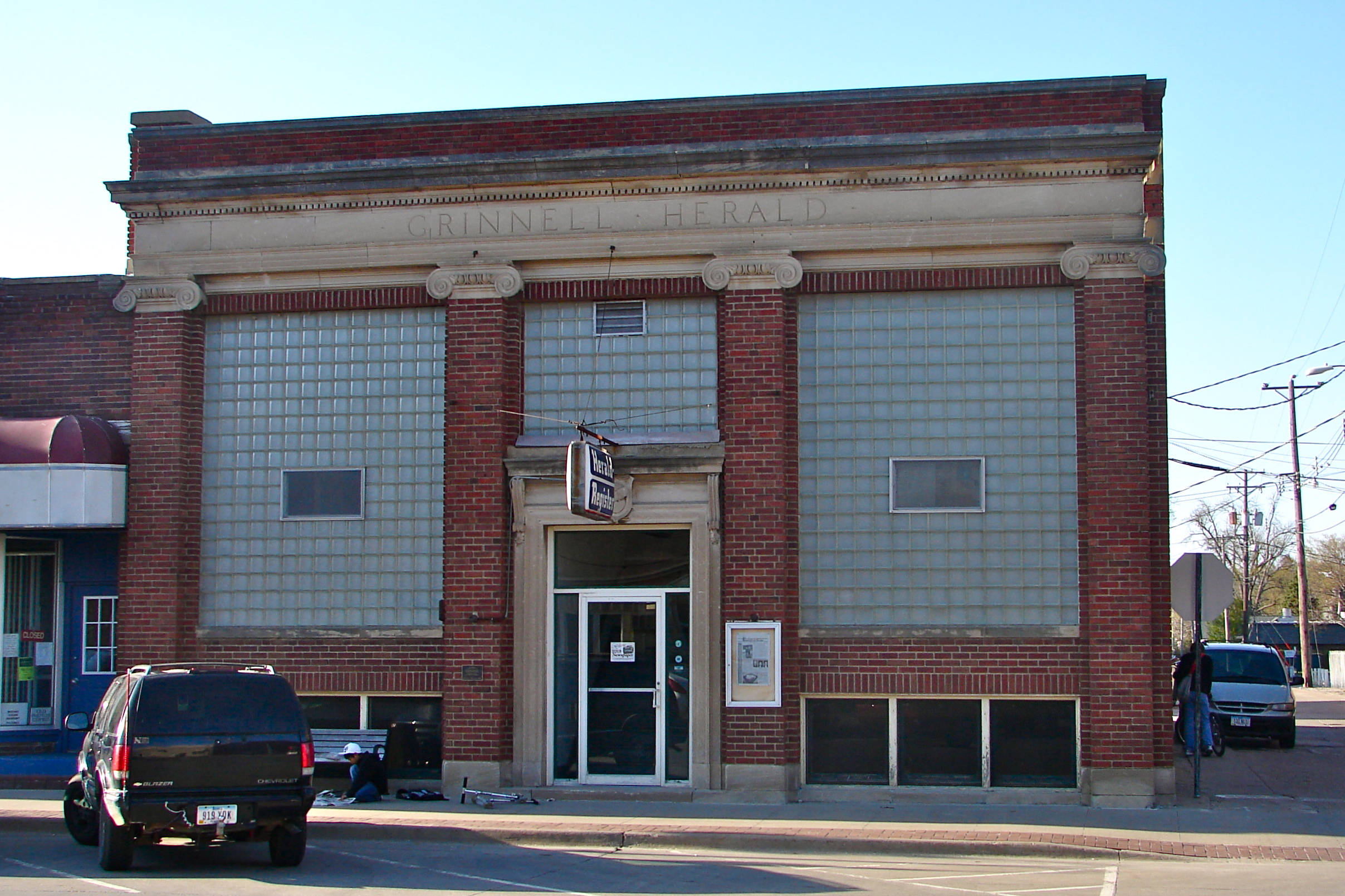
Grinnell Herald Building, Grinnell, Iowa, 1916.

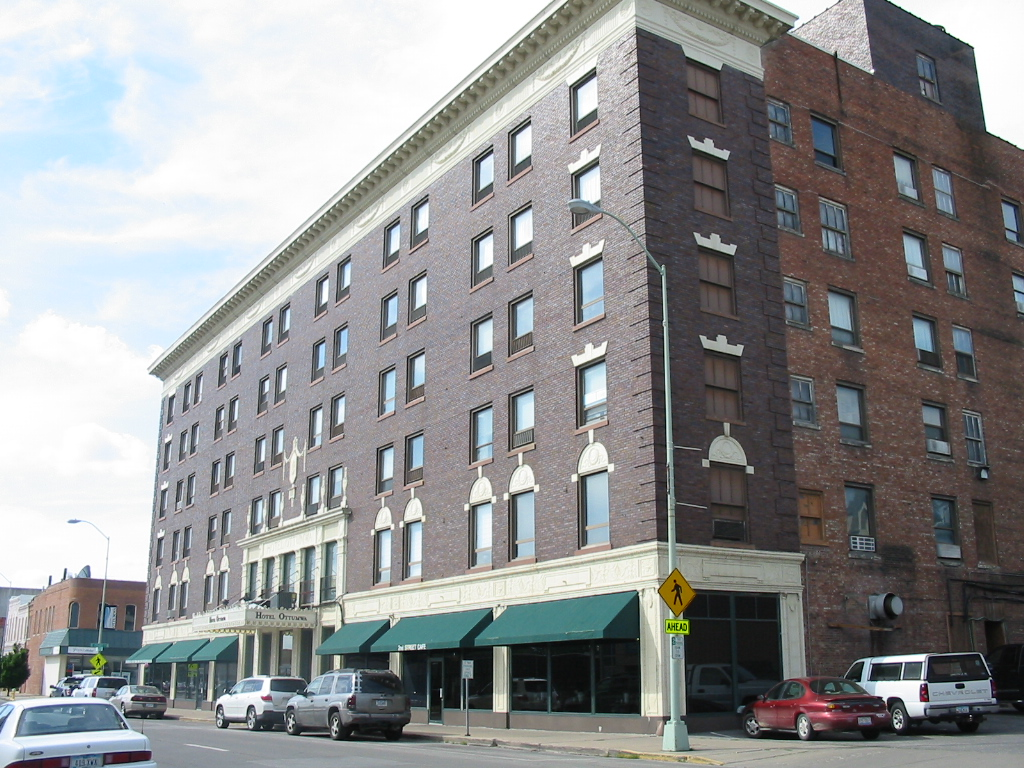
Hotel Ottumwa, Ottumwa, Iowa, 1916-17.

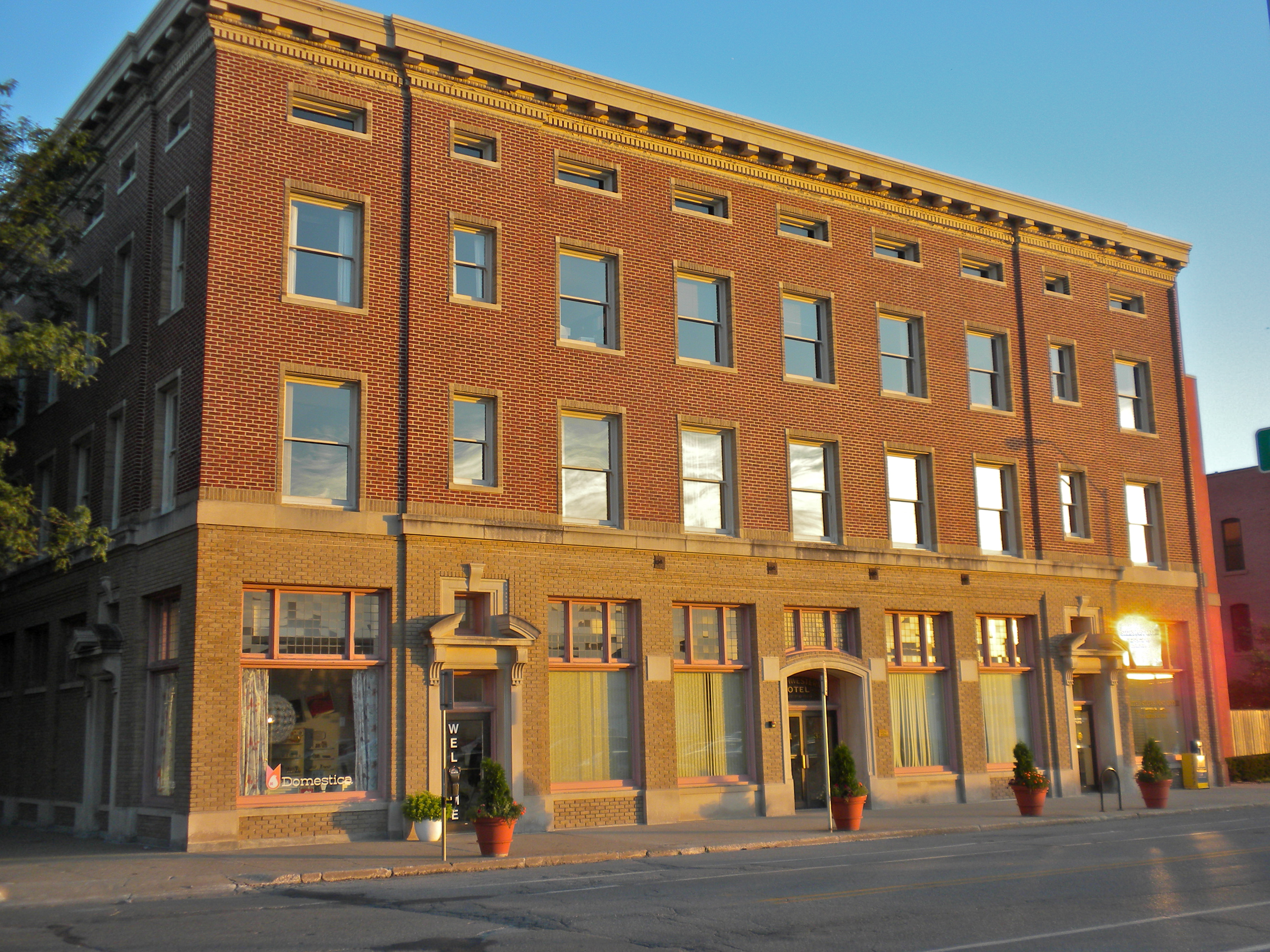
Northwestern Hotel, Des Moines, Iowa, 1916.

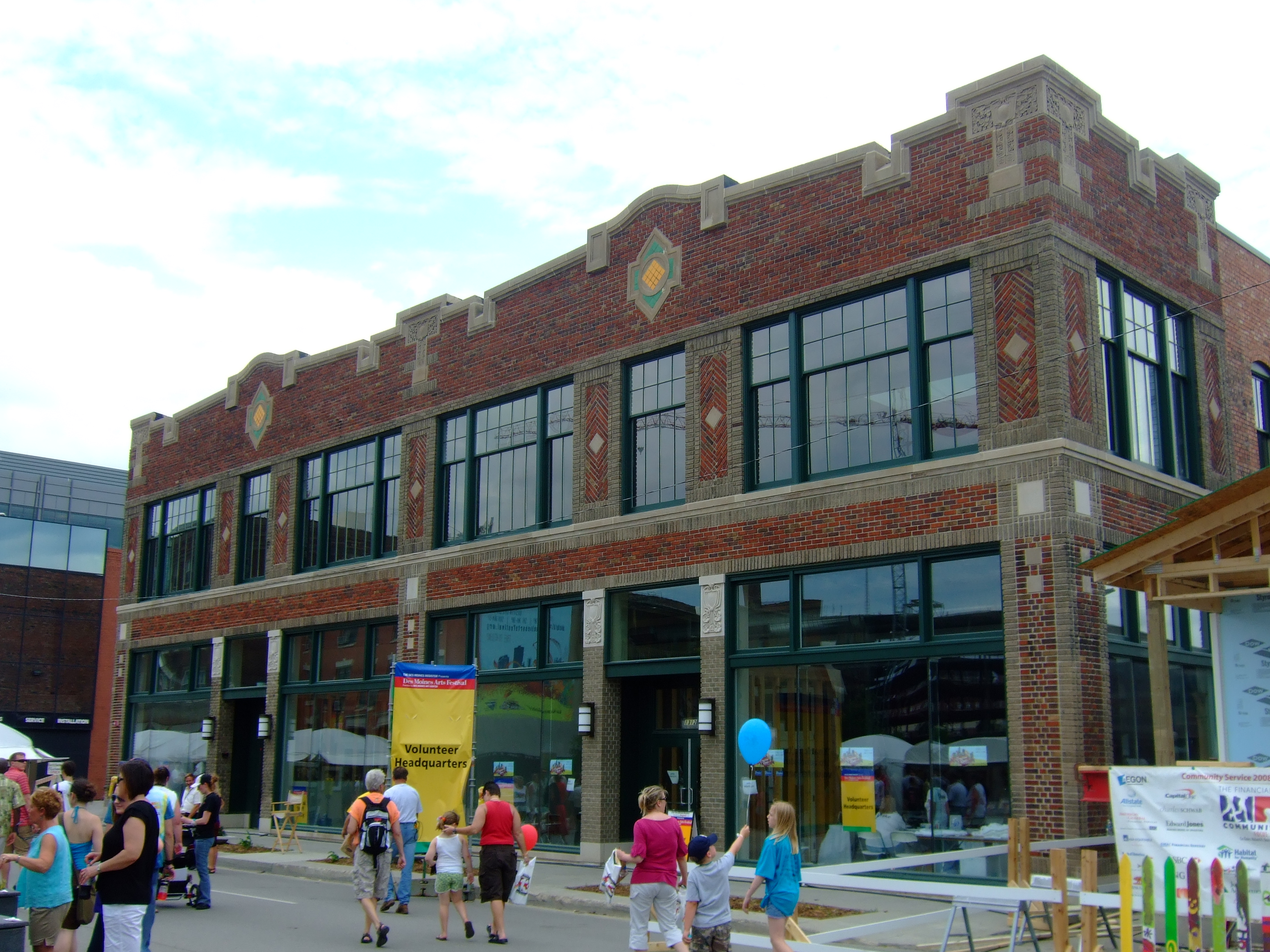
D.S. Chamberlain Building, Des Moines, Iowa, 1917.

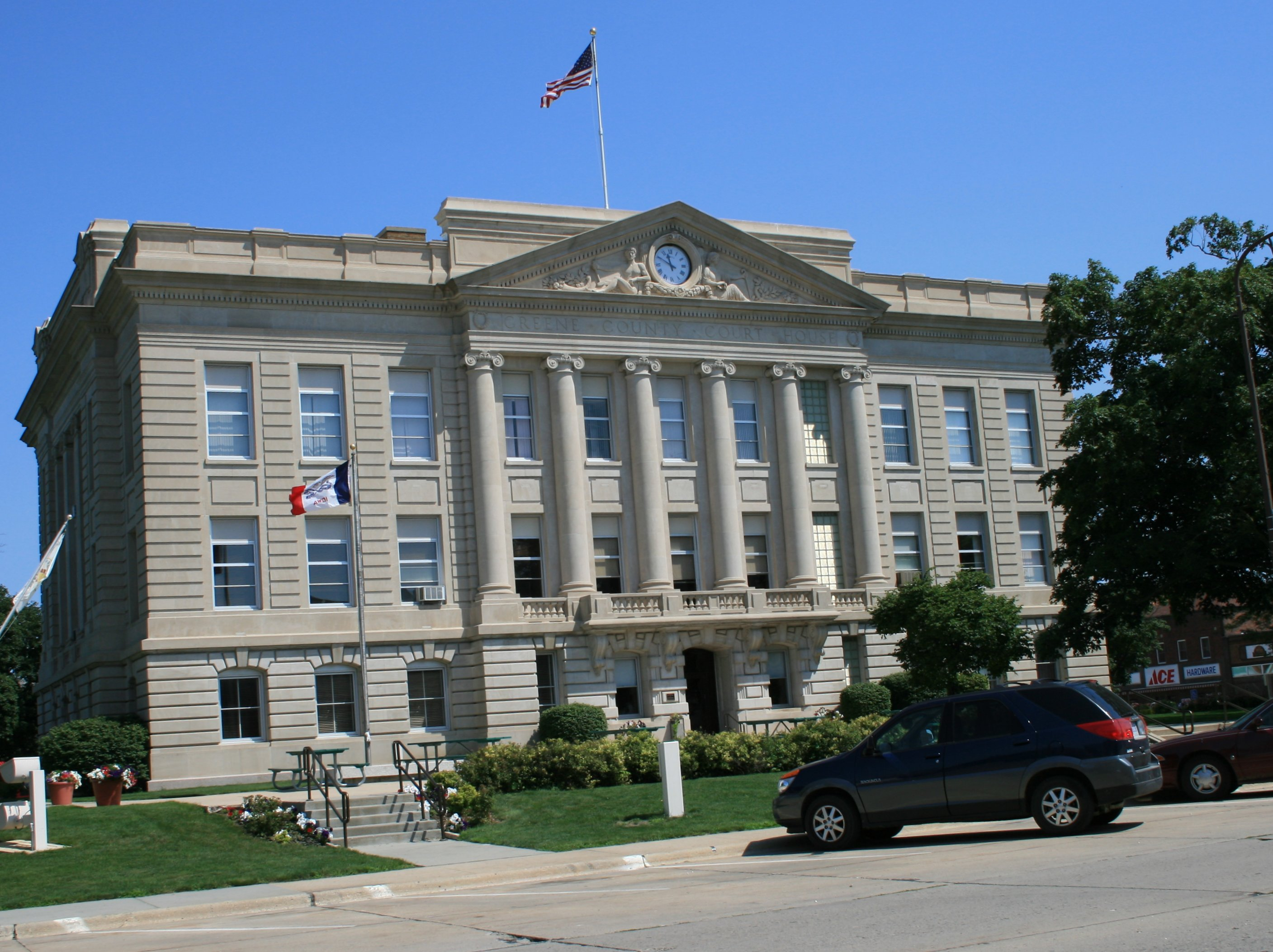
Greene County Courthouse, Jefferson, Iowa, 1918.

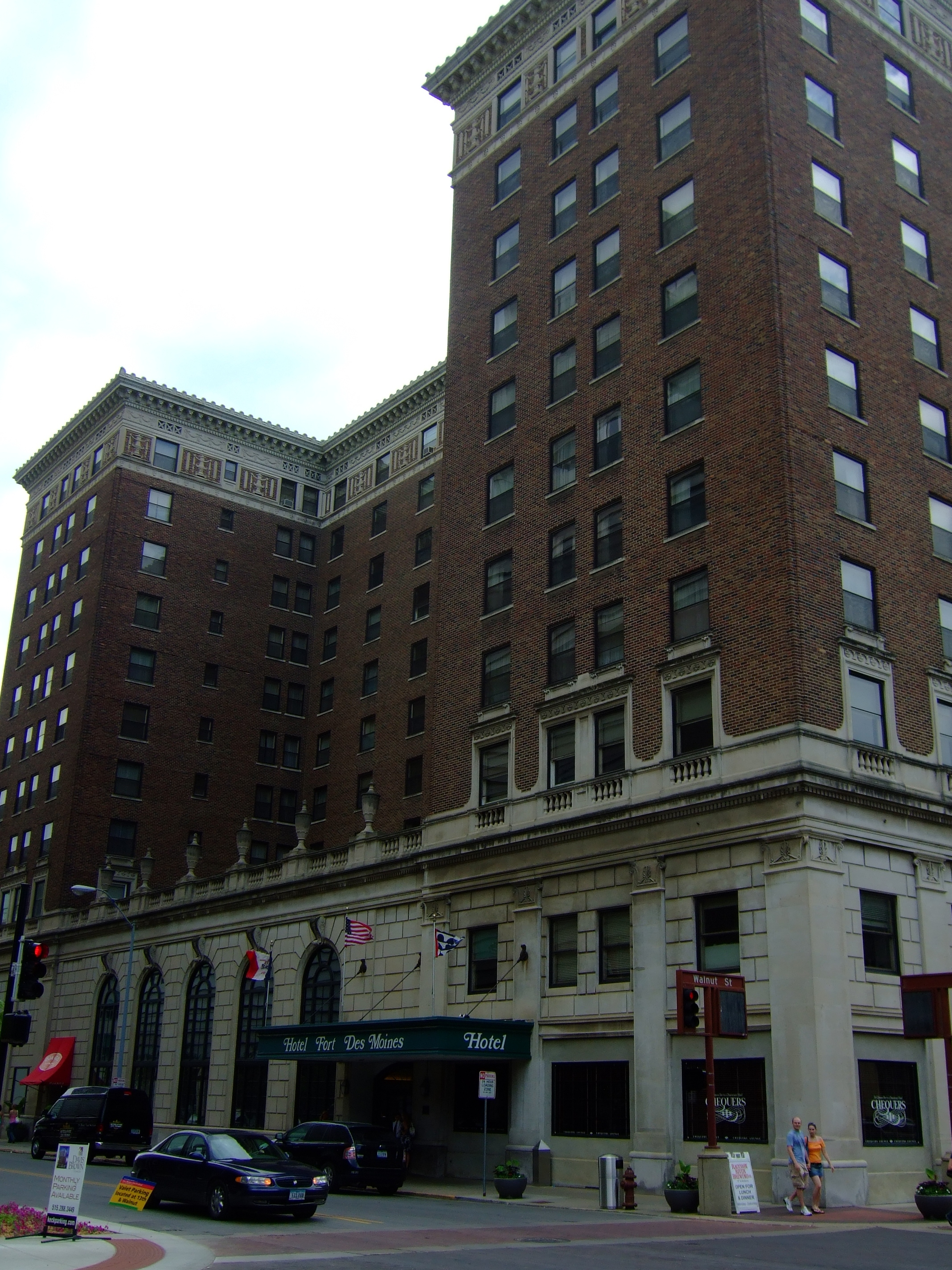
Hotel Fort Des Moines, Des Moines, Iowa, 1918-19.

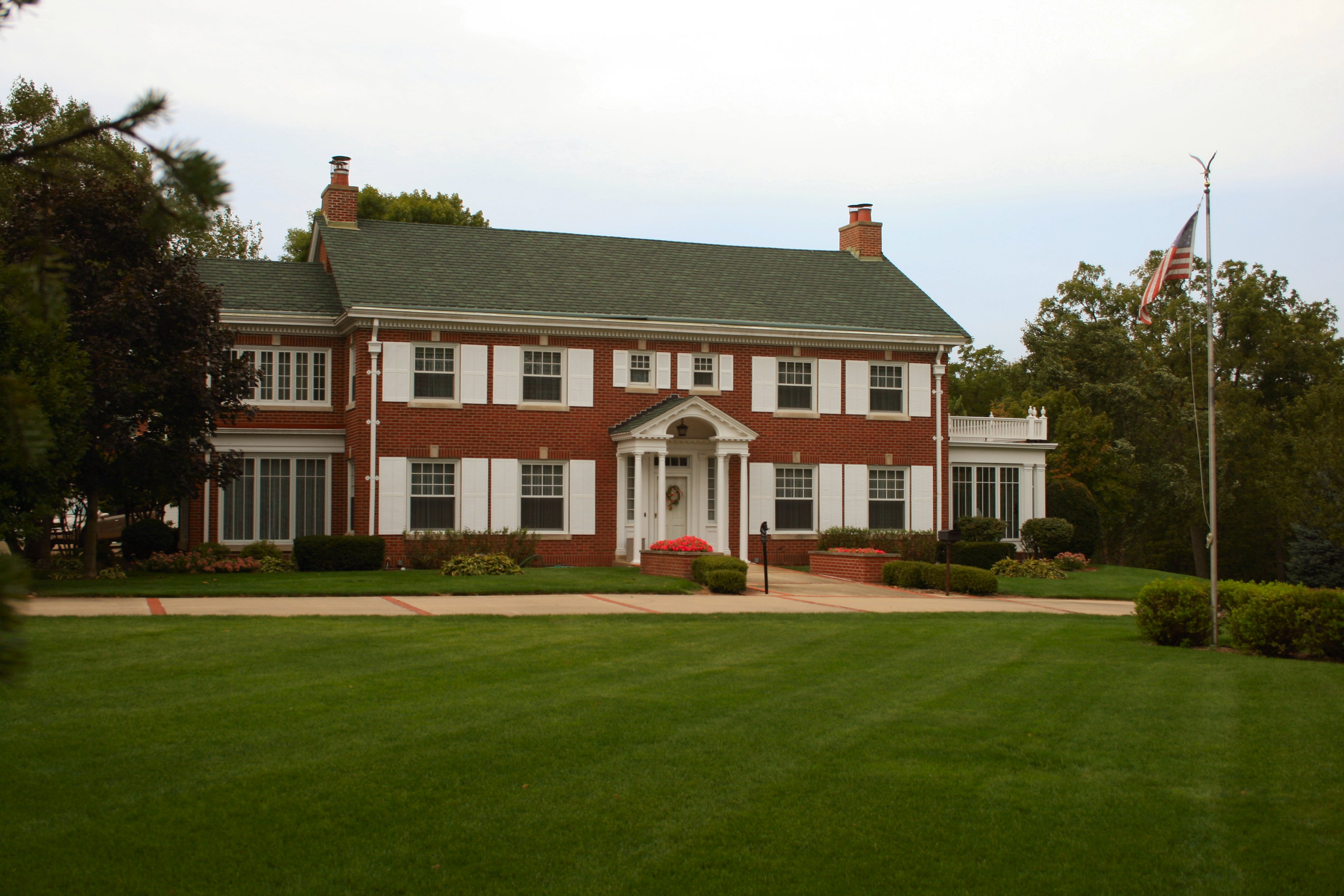
House for John H. Herman, Boone, Iowa, 1919.

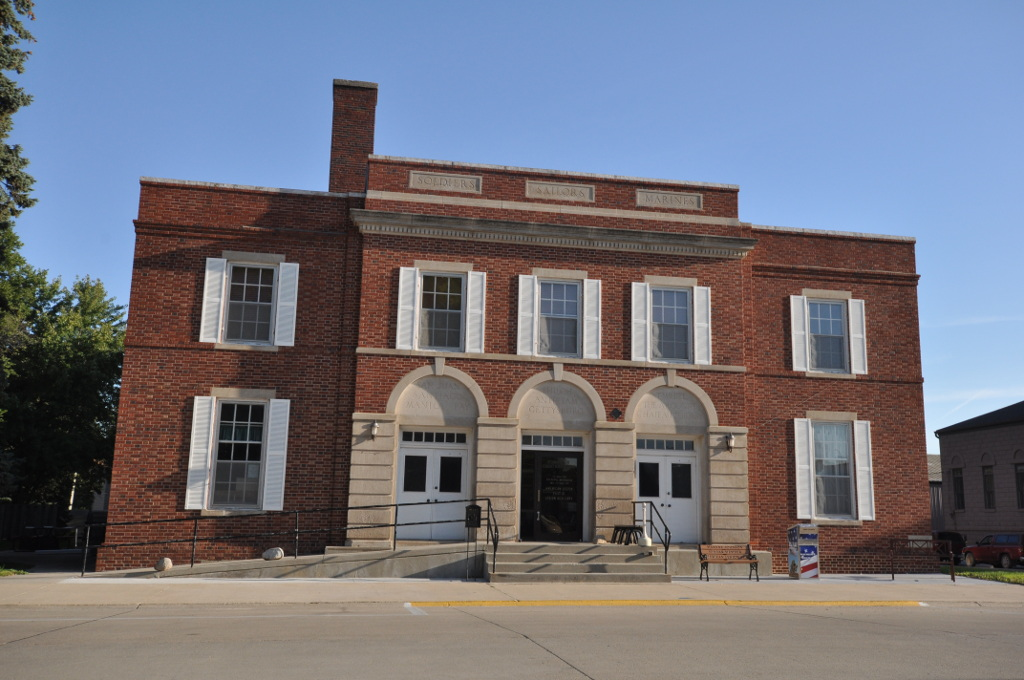
Lake City Community Memorial Building, Lake City, Iowa, 1920.

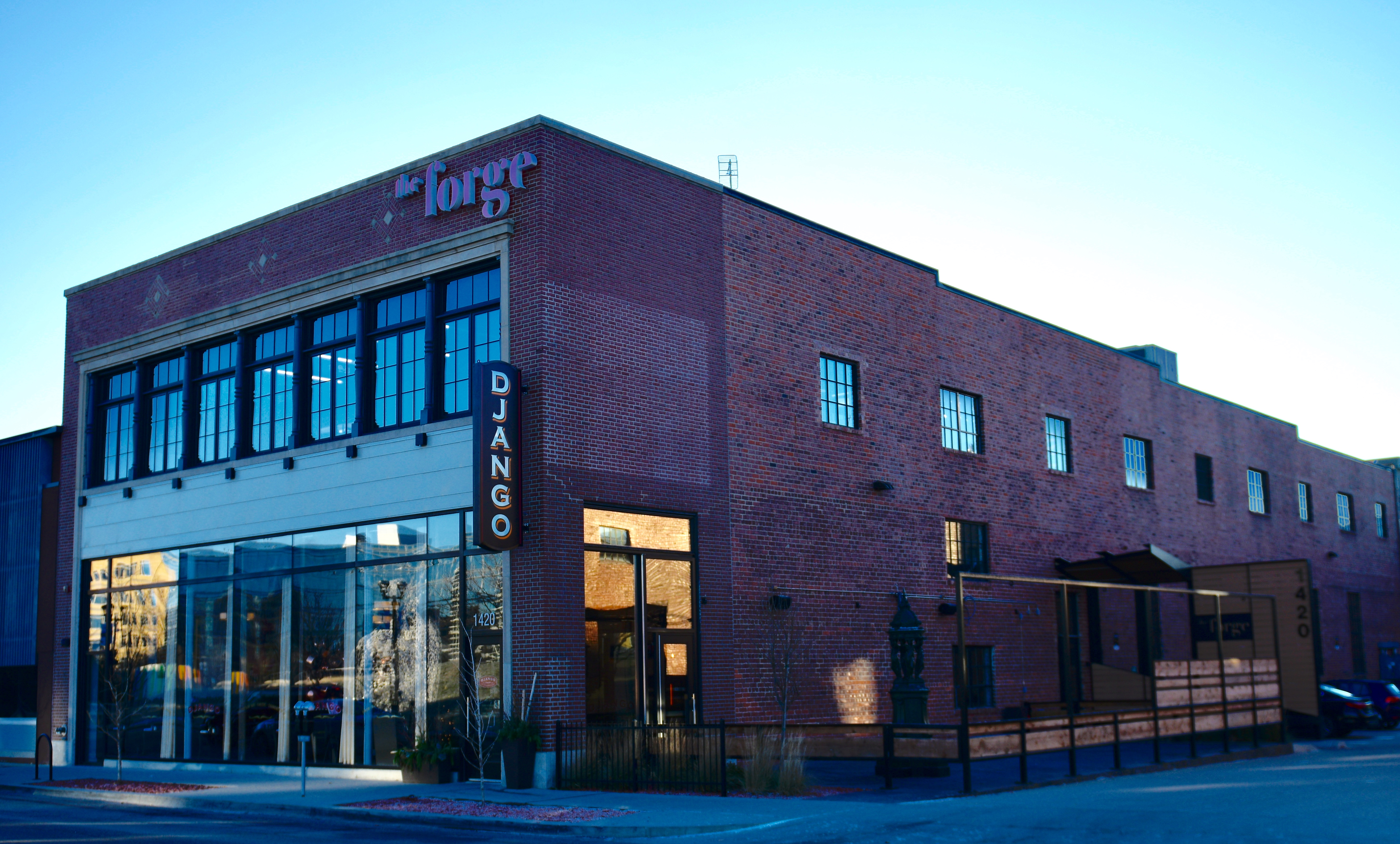
Apperson Iowa Motor Car Company Building, Des Moines, Iowa, 1921.

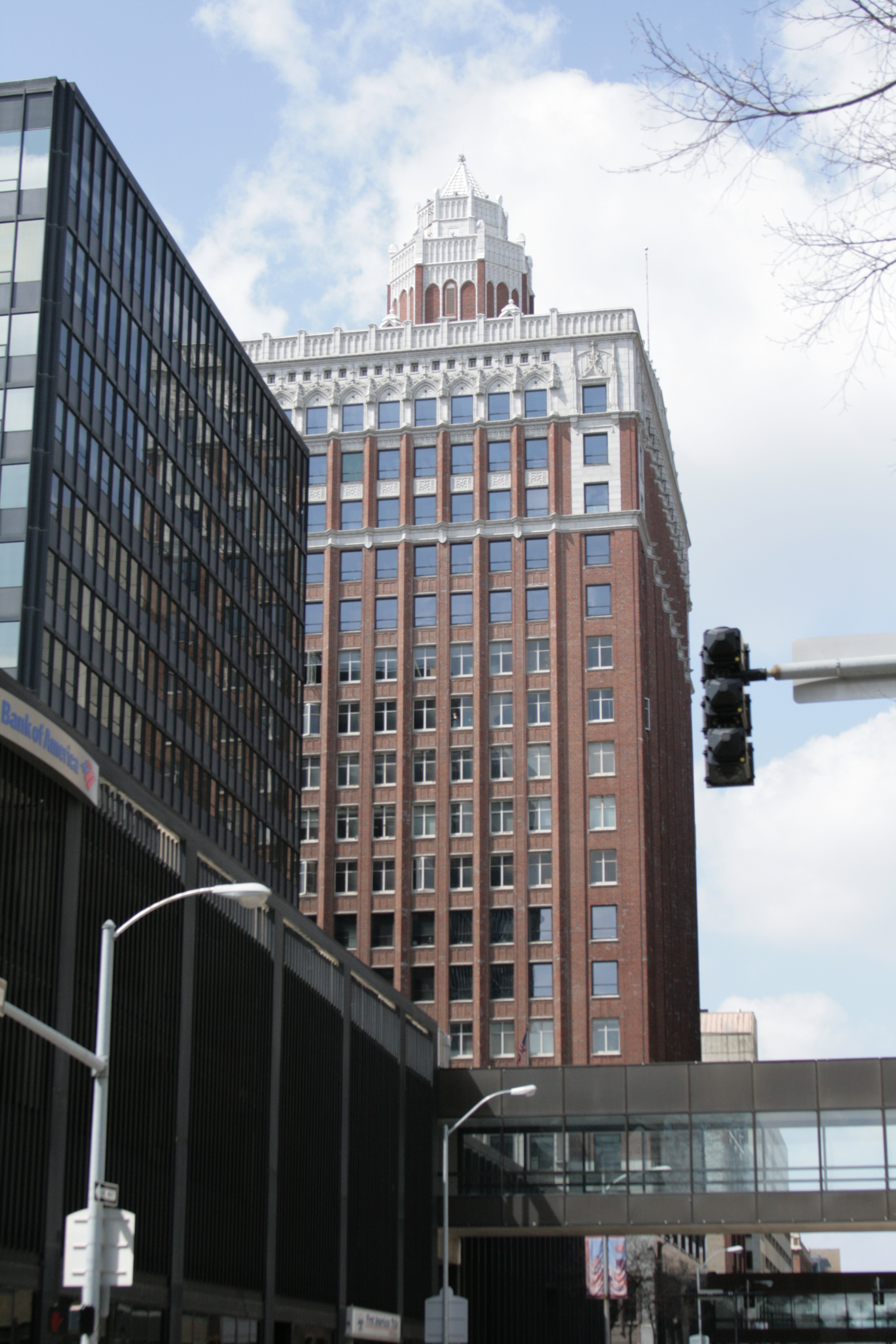
Equitable Building, Des Moines, Iowa, 1922-24.

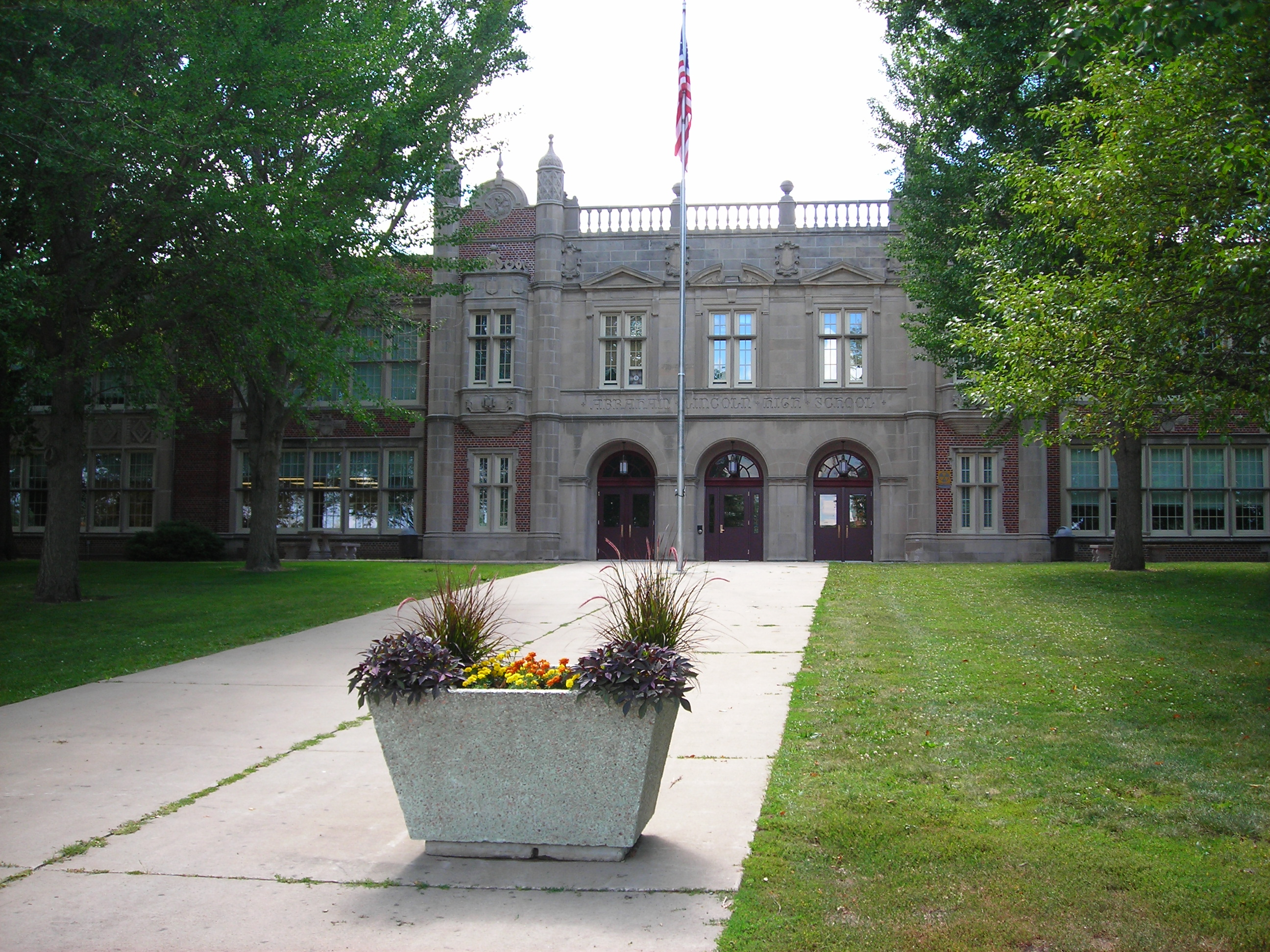
Abraham Lincoln High School, Des Moines, Iowa, 1922.

Theodore Roosevelt High School, Des Moines, Iowa, 1922.

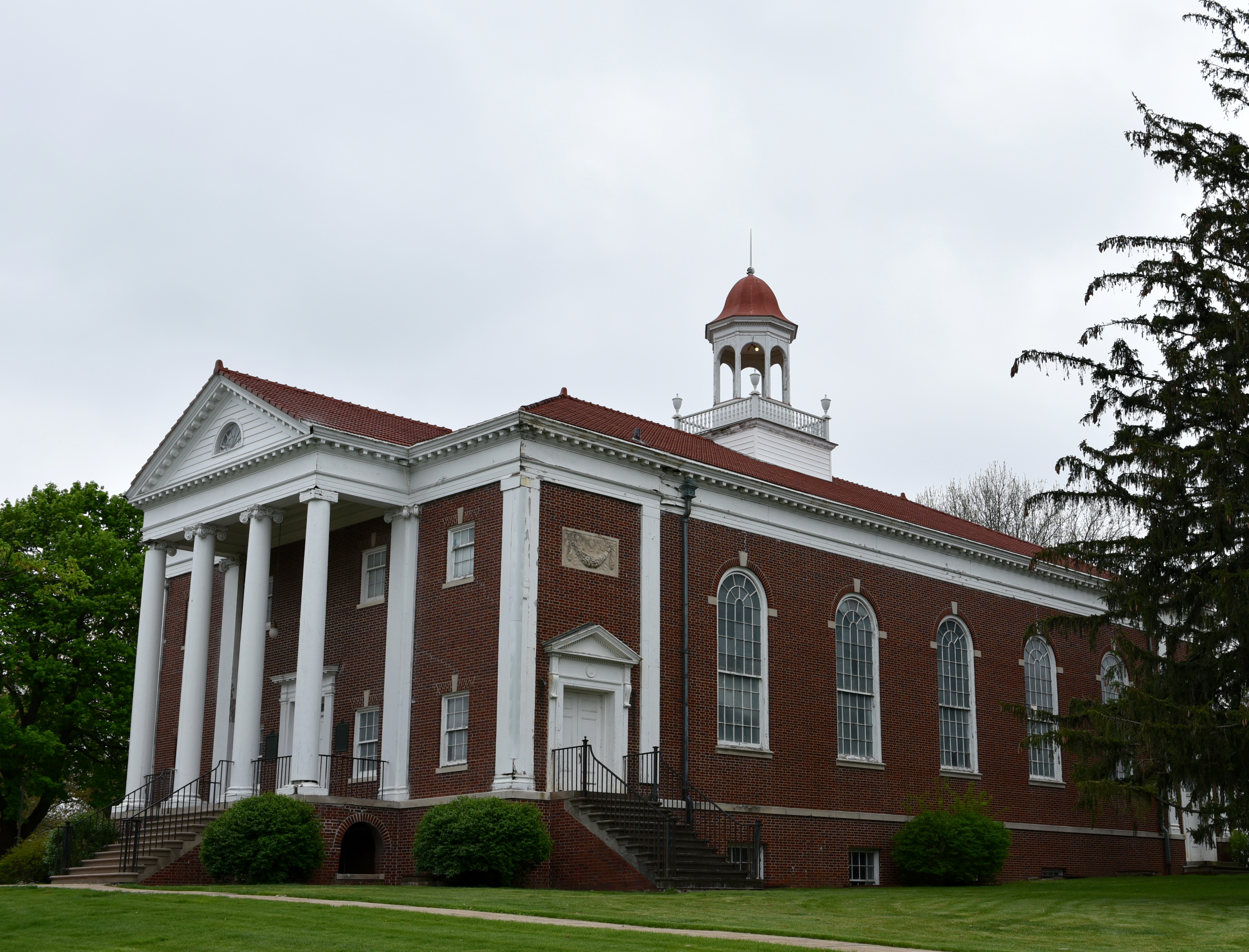
Spencer Memorial Chapel, William Penn University, Oskaloosa, Iowa, 1922-23.

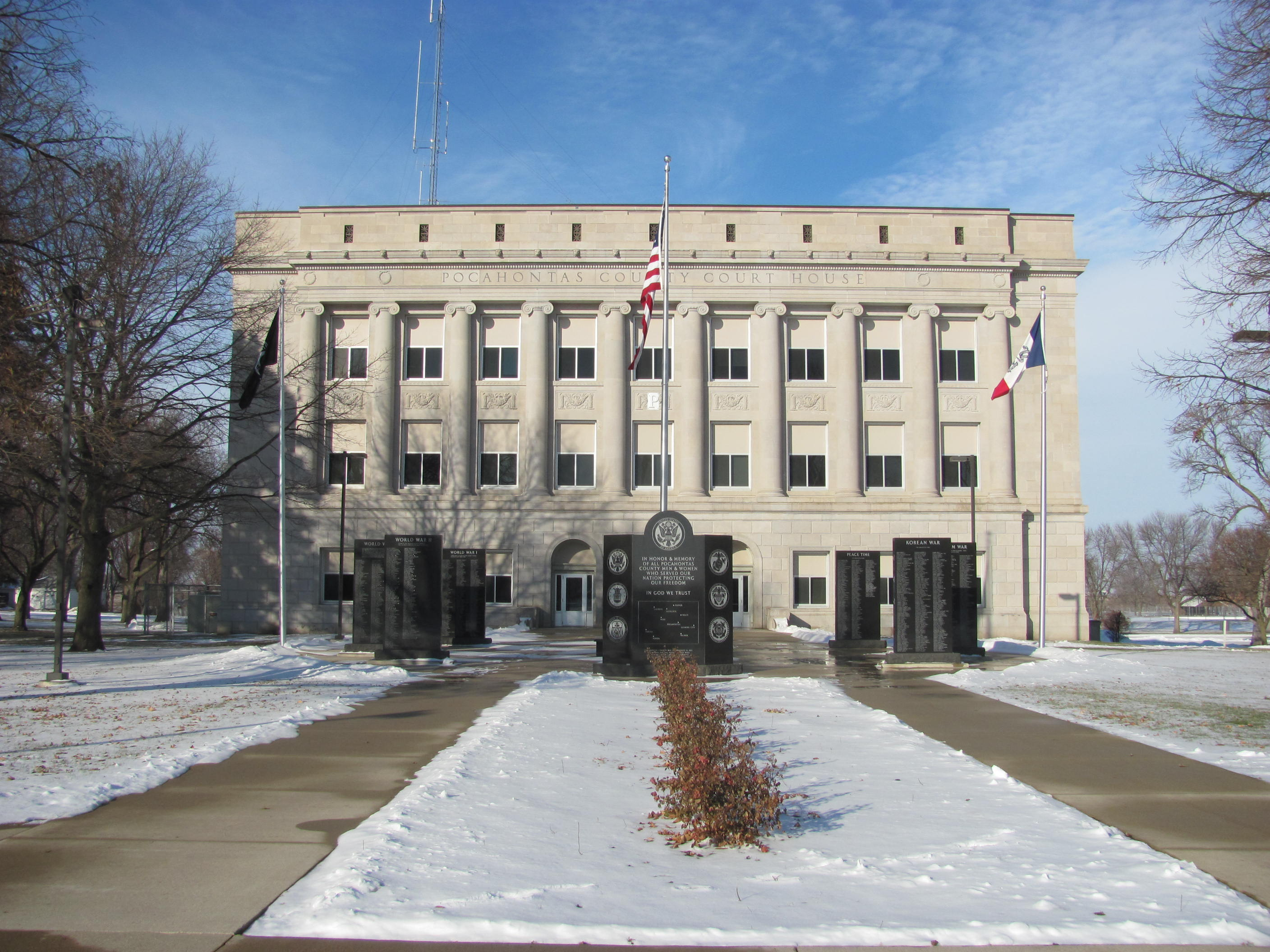
Pocahontas County Courthouse, Pocahontas, Iowa, 1923.

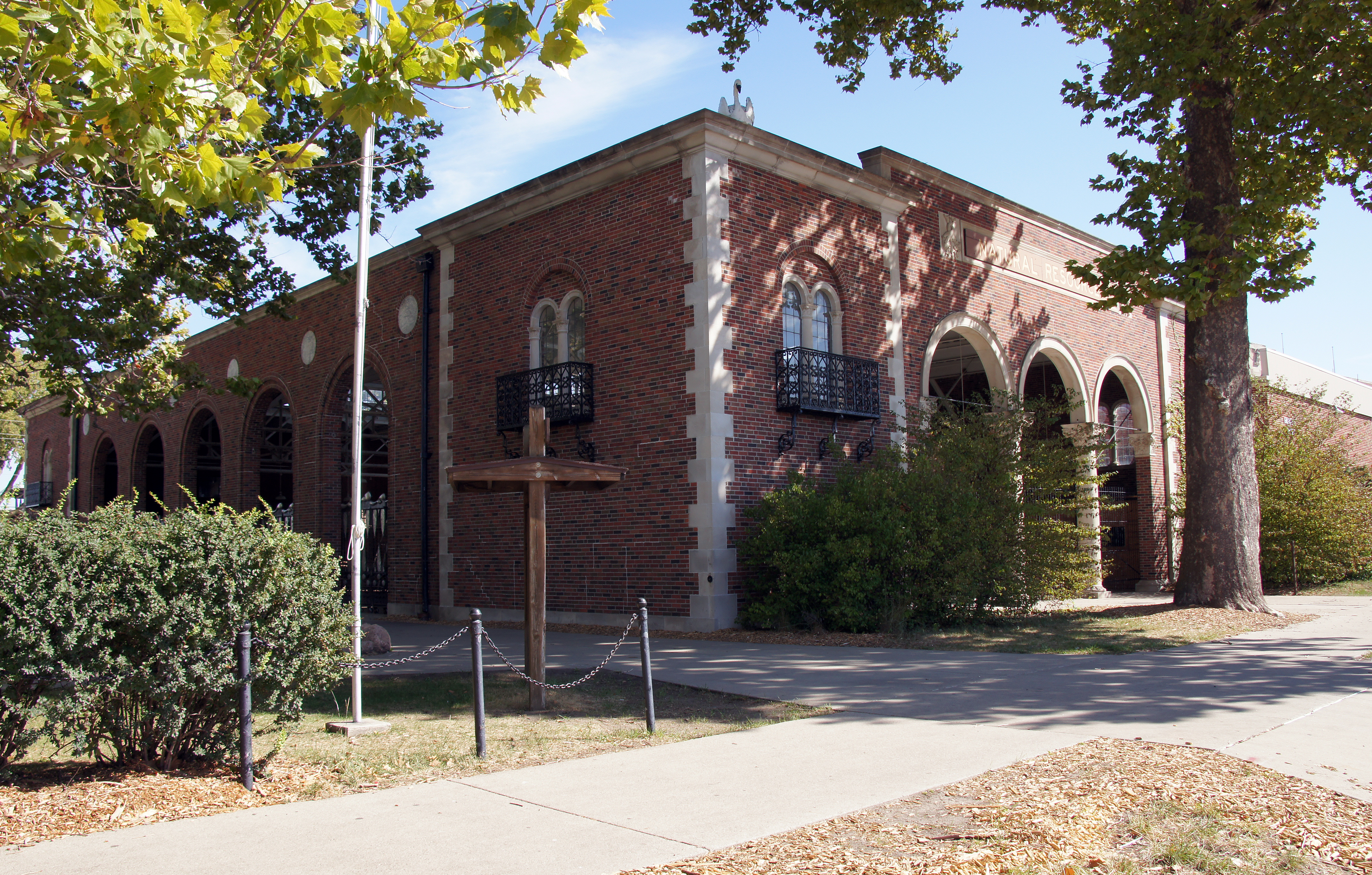
Fish and Game Pavilion and Aquarium, Iowa State Fairgrounds, Des Moines, Iowa, 1926-27 and 1929.

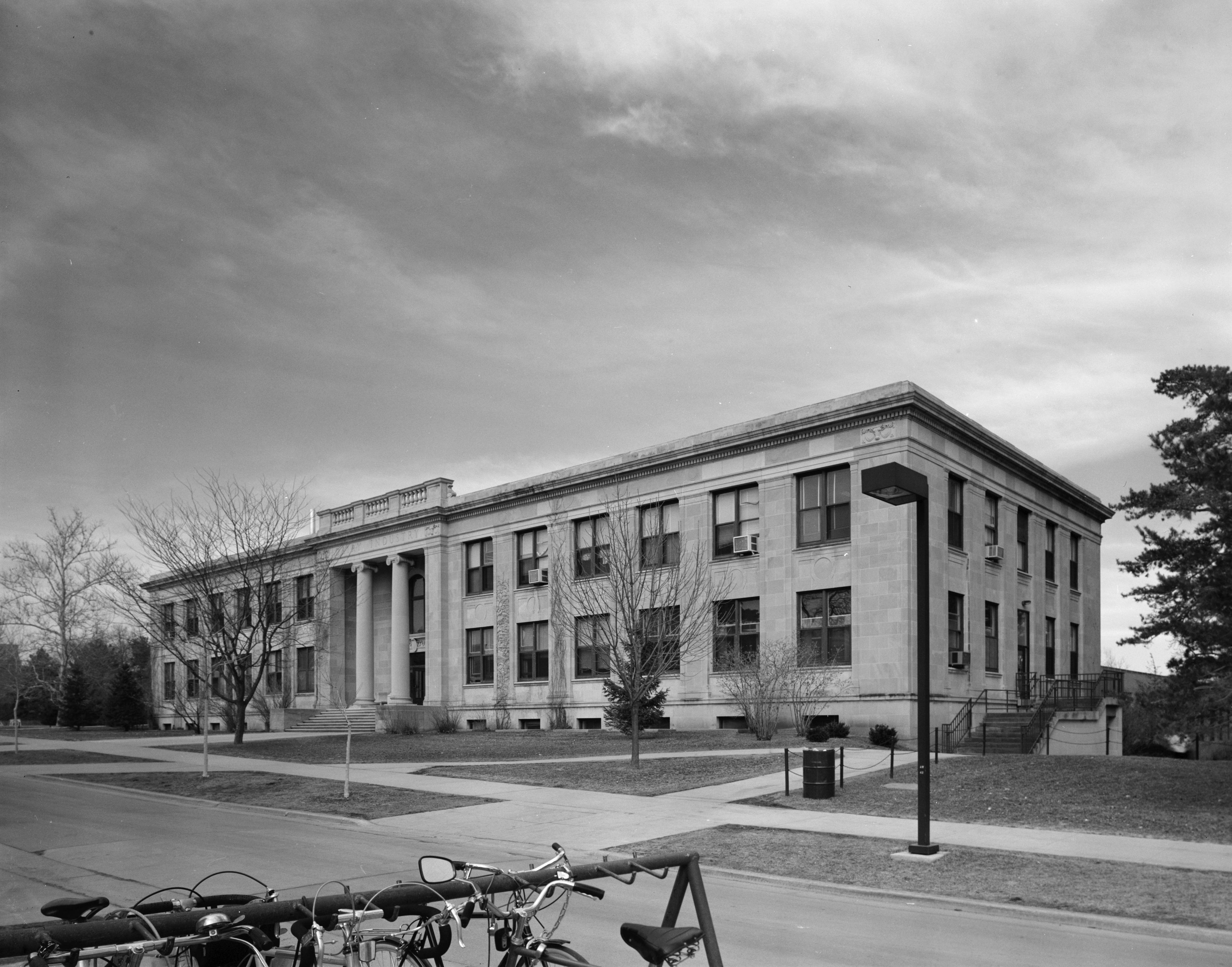
Food Sciences Building, Iowa State University, Ames, Iowa, 1927-28.

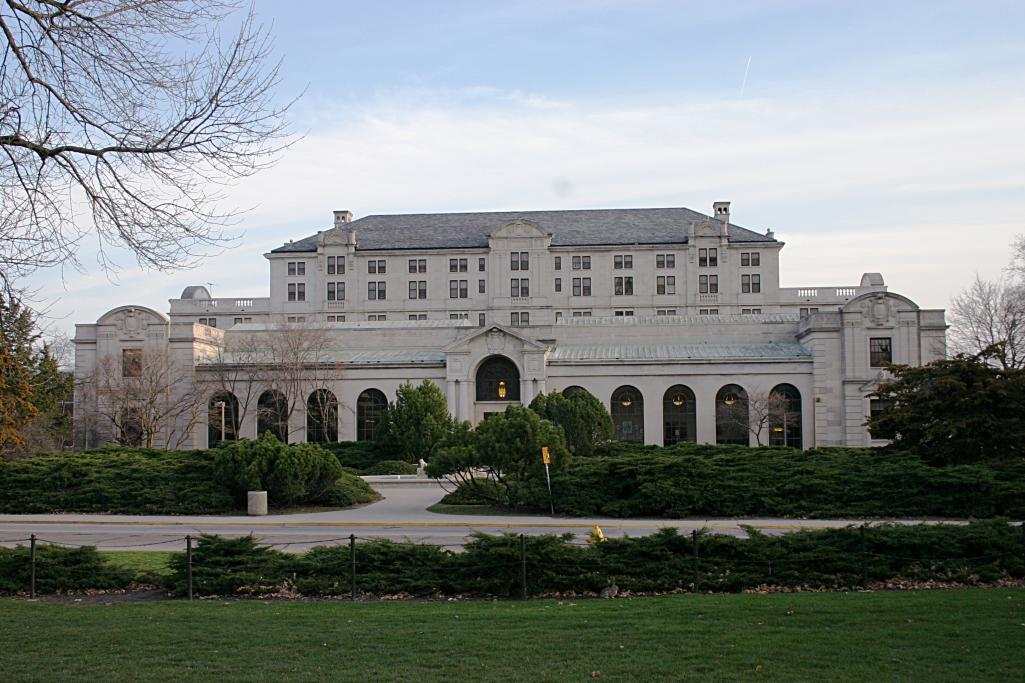
Memorial Union, Iowa State University, Ames, Iowa, 1927-28.

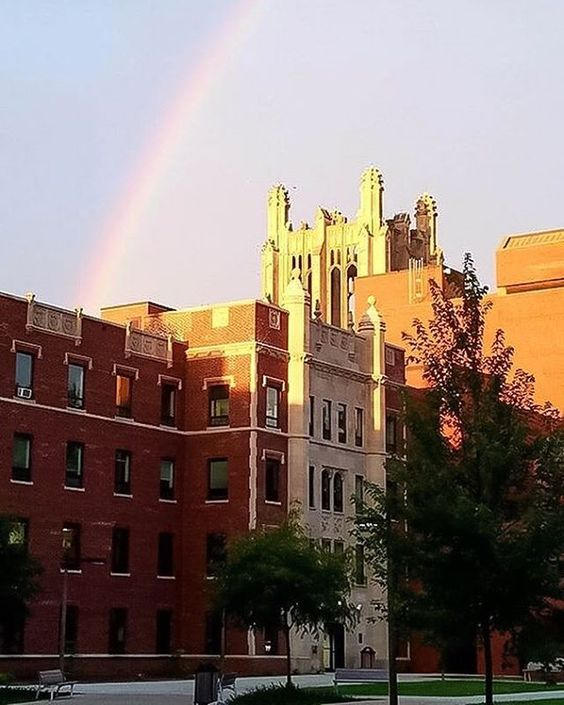
University of Iowa Hospitals and Clinics, Iowa City, Iowa, 1928.

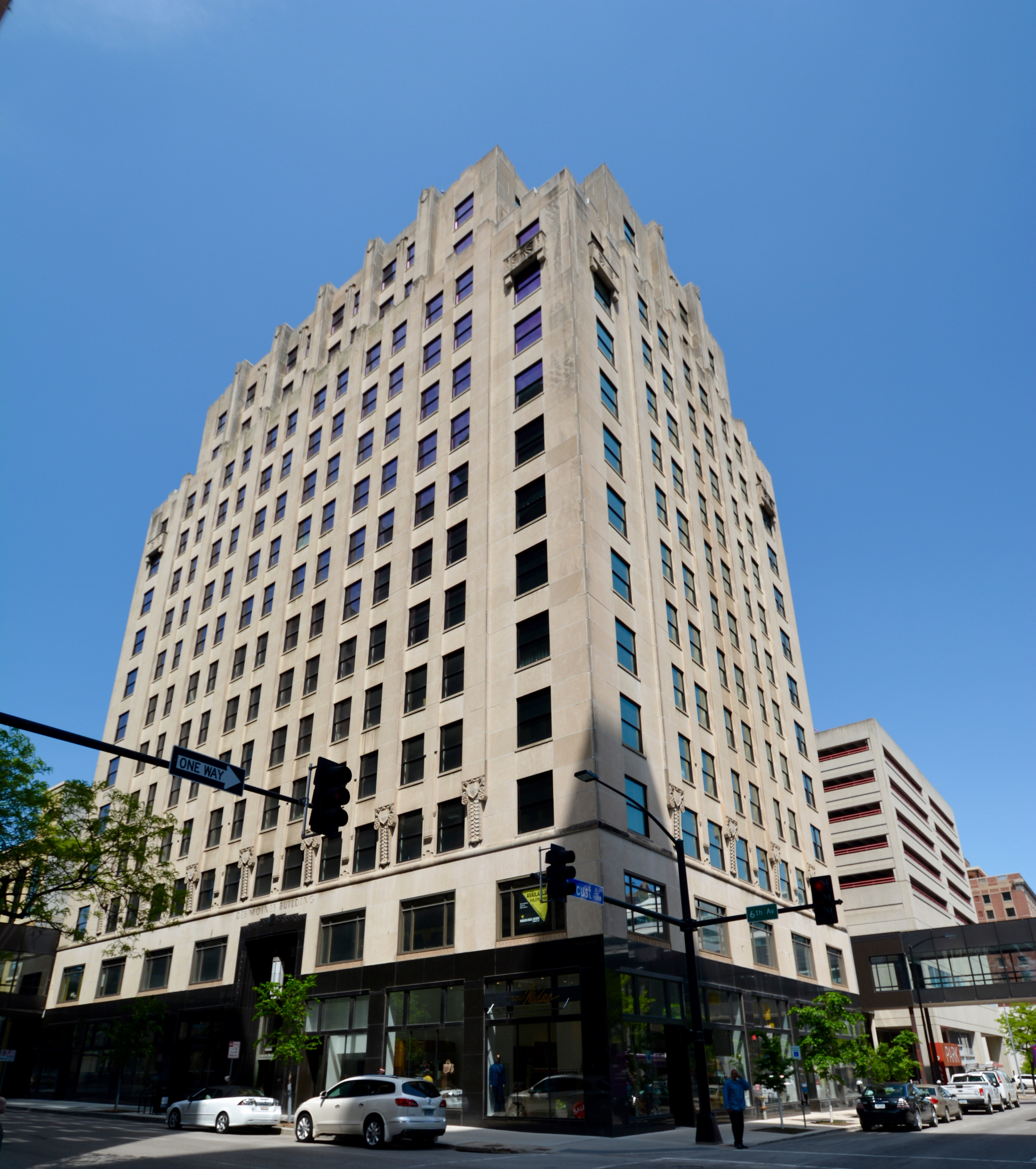
Des Moines Building, Des Moines, Iowa, 1930-31.

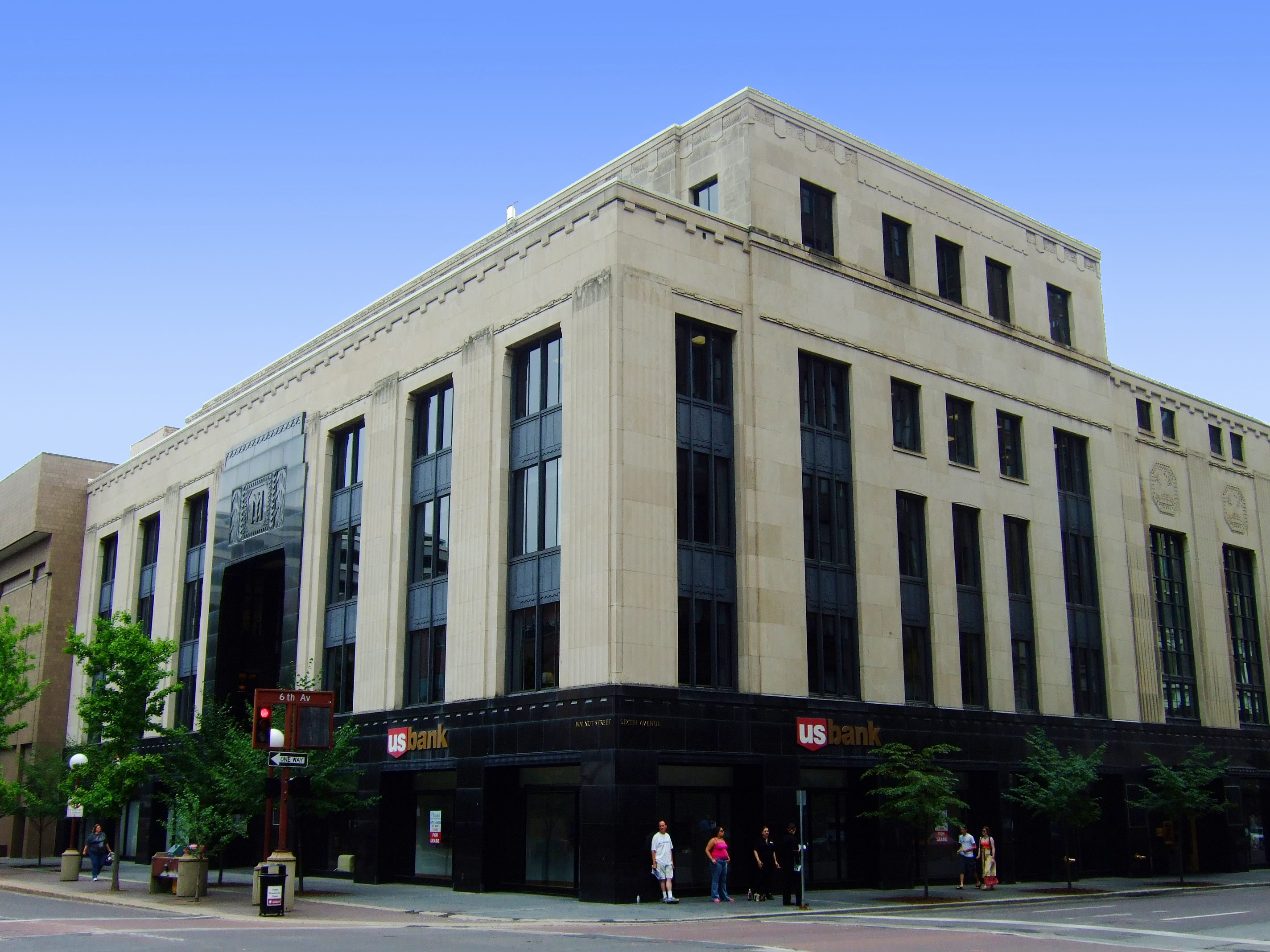
Iowa-Des Moines National Bank Building, Des Moines, Iowa, 1931-32.

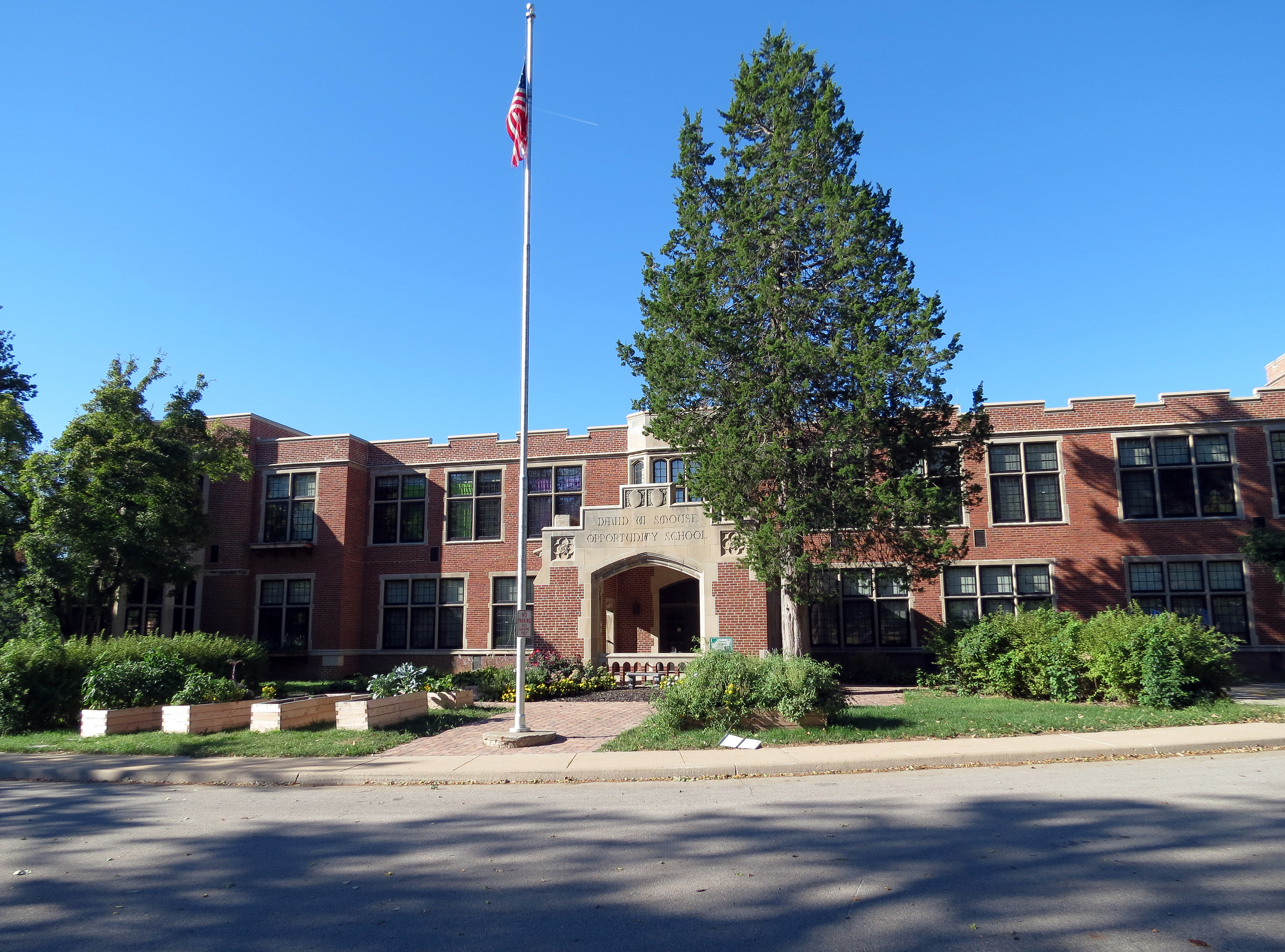
David W. Smouse Opportunity School, Des Moines, Iowa, 1931.

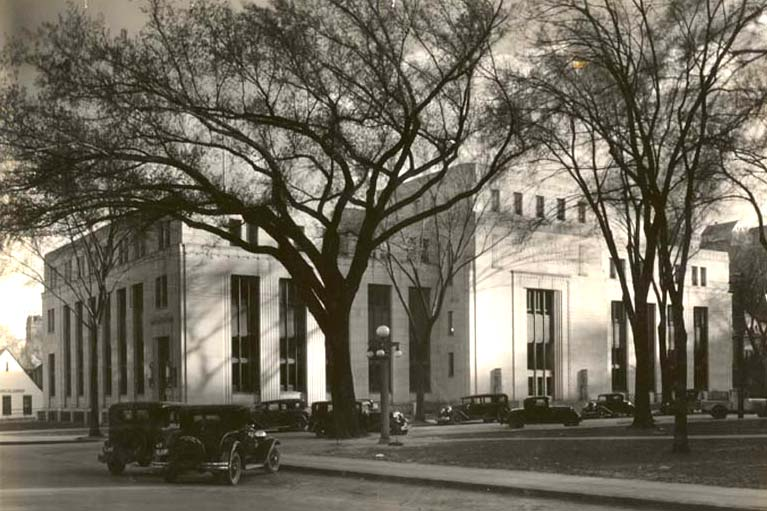
United States Post Office and Courthouse, Dubuque, Iowa, 1932-34.

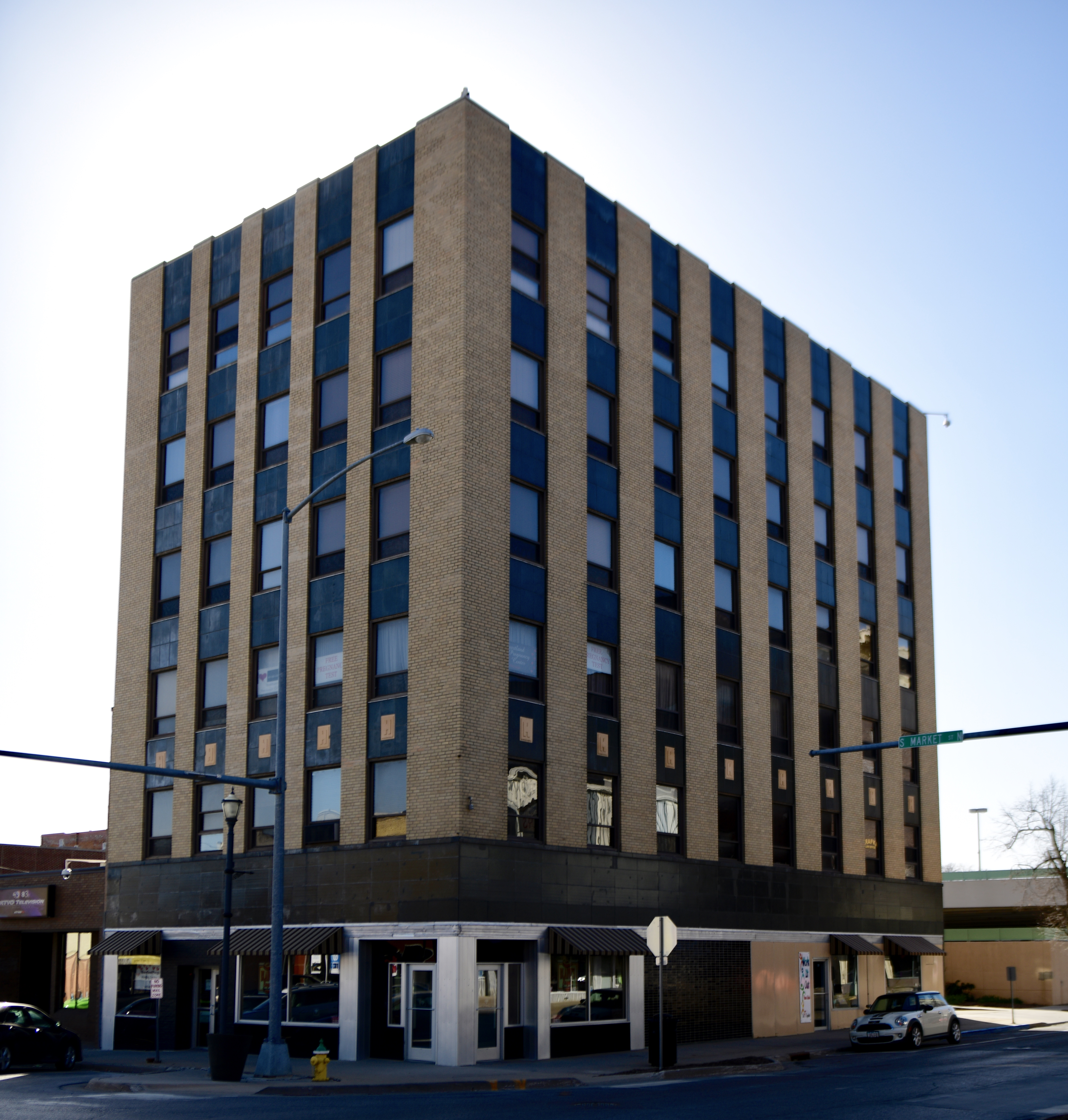
Hofmann Building, Ottumwa, Iowa, 1941.

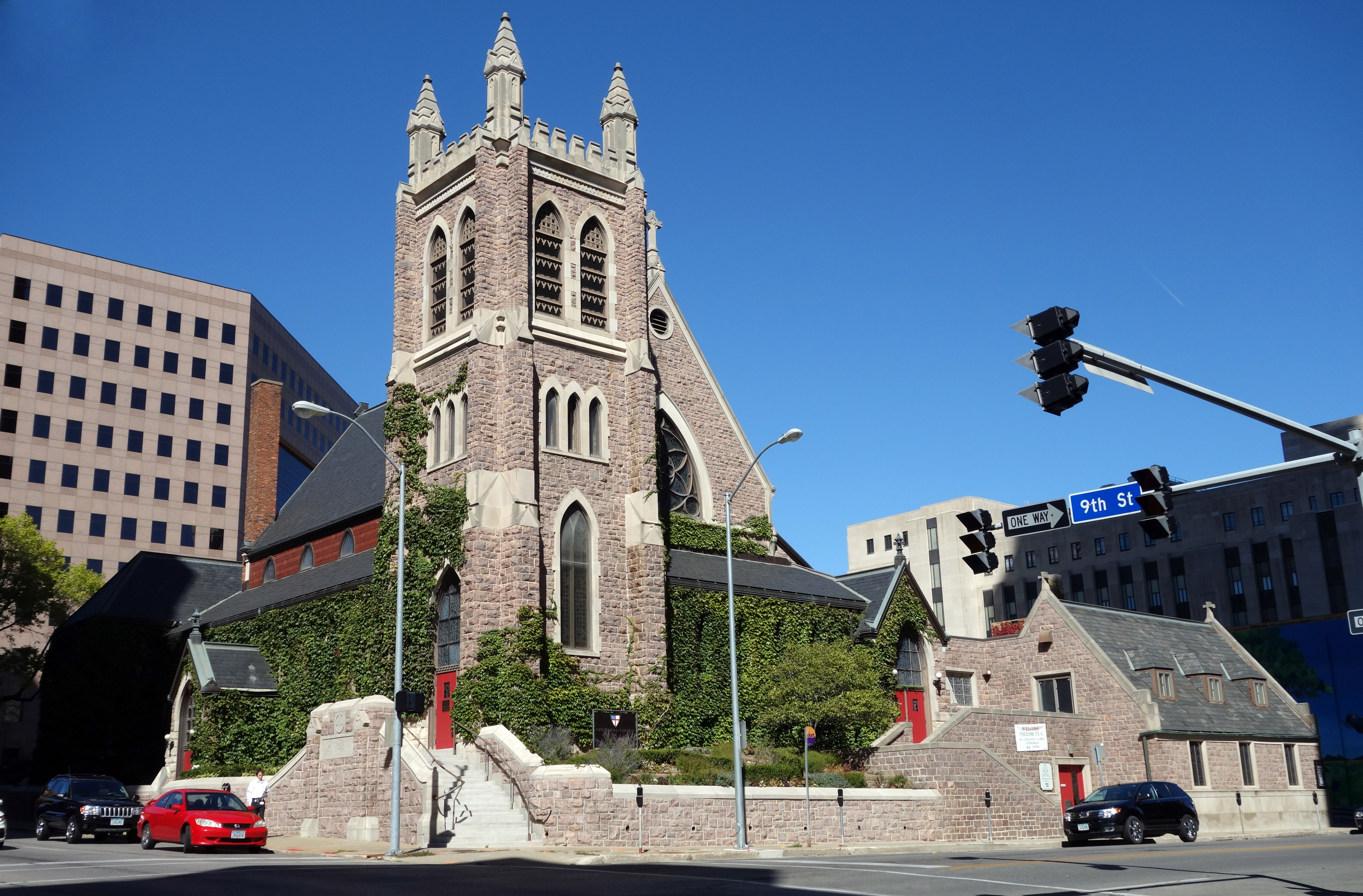
Cathedral Church of Saint Paul parish house (right), Des Moines, Iowa, 1952.
