= Butter (2011 film) =

2011 film by Jim Field Smith

- Theatrical release poster
- Directed by: Jim Field Smith
- Written by: Jason Micallef
- Produced by: Michael De Luca; Jennifer Garner; Alissa Phillips
- Starring: Jennifer Garner; Ty Burrell; Olivia Wilde; Rob Corddry; Ashley Greene; Alicia Silverstone; Yara Shahidi; Hugh Jackman
- Cinematography: Jim Denault
- Edited by: Matt Garner; Dan Schalk
- Music by: Mateo Messina
- Production companies: Vandalia Films; Michael De Luca Productions
- Distributed by: RADiUS-TWC
- Release dates: September 4, 2011 (Telluride Film Festival); October 5, 2012 (United States)
- Running time: 90 minutes
- Country: United States
- Language: English
- Budget: $10.8 million
- Box office: $175,706

Butter is a 2011 American independent comedy film directed by Jim Field Smith, from a screenplay by Jason Micallef, starring Yara Shahidi, Jennifer Garner, Ty Burrell, Olivia Wilde, Rob Corddry, Ashley Greene, Alicia Silverstone, and Hugh Jackman. The film is about an Iowa State Fair butter sculpture contest and the competitors and onlookers who attend said contest. It premiered at the 2011 Telluride Film Festival on September 4, 2011, and was released on October 5, 2012, by The Weinstein Company through its RADiUS-TWC distribution arm. The film is said to be a satire of the 2008 Democratic presidential primary. Butter received mixed reviews from critics, who questioned Smith's direction of the film's script in terms of humor and satire and the performances from the ensemble cast. The film was a box-office bomb, grossing $175,706 worldwide against a production budget of $10.8 million.

== Plot ==
In Johnson County, Iowa, Destiny is a 10-year-old African American foster child being raised by a white couple, Ethan and Jill Emmet. While visiting the Iowa State Fair by herself, she wanders into the exhibit of the winning butter sculpture, a life-sized Last Supper, and skillfully finishes the Holy Grail cup, which impresses the sculpture's creator, Bob Pickler.

Bob has won the fair's butter-sculpture contest for the past 15 years straight; because of his dominance, he is asked to abstain from future competitions to give others a chance. Bob's overly-competitive, socially-ambitious wife Laura goes to the home of the competition's organizer to protest. He goes to a strip club and stripper Brooke talks him into having sex in his minivan. Laura discovers them, T-boning the van with her SUV.

Laura decides to enter the county's preliminary sculpture competition herself because of the social status that comes with winning. Destiny decides to enter as well, as does Brooke, who just wants to harass the Picklers because Bob owes her $600. Despite practice, Laura comes in second to Destiny.

When Brooke appears at the Picklers' seeking her money, Bob's daughter Kaitlin admits her, letting her in her window. After they talk a bit, Kaitlin challenges Brooke to a game of truth-or-dare which escalates to them having sex. She is drawn to Brooke's alternative style and attitude. Brooke wants the money (she ups the amount to $1200), which she says she can get.

Meanwhile, Kaitlin's stepmother, Laura hooks up with Boyd Bolton, an old high-school boyfriend who is now an owner of a used-car dealership, also is a skilled butter sculptor. She seduces him to get him to falsely testify to county officials that Ethan paid him to help Destiny in the competition. Laura suggests a rematch at the state fair. Destiny agrees; everyone else is disgruntled.

Brooke gets her money from an infatuated Kaitlin, meets Destiny after school, and takes her to the mall to buy her a $1200 set of chef's knives to help her in the rematch with Laura. When Destiny gets home, a social worker informs her that her biological mother has died and gives her a picture of her mom holding her as a baby.

At the state fair, Laura carves a replica of John F. Kennedy's car immediately after his assassination, complete with his blown-up skull and Jackie Kennedy and Clint Hill crawling onto the trunk; Destiny creates her biological mother holding her infant self in a rocking chair. That night before the judging, Boyd sneaks into the butter-sculpture room and defaces Destiny's sculpture with a blowtorch.

Destiny, disappointed and expecting to lose now, encounters Laura in the restroom and offers the forgiveness of her handshake. Laura tells her that winning the butter-sculpting contest means more to her than the little girl can comprehend. Laura feels she has little opportunity to distinguish herself otherwise, while Destiny has talent and her entire life to realize her own potential.

Despite the damage, Destiny's sculpture wins. The sabotage of the piece is recognized as "higher art" as the judges believe the melted face lends the butter sculpture a greater depth. She goes on to win in the state competition, where judges give a positive critique on her piece, deeming it an "angst-ridden exploration of post-natal abandonment."

Upon her victory, Destiny comforts Laura by telling her, "This isn't all you have." Laura hugs her, understanding that she must move on to greater triumphs that are her own.

Later, Destiny is officially adopted by the Emmets and Laura runs for Governor, claiming that God appeared to her and advised her to run.

== Cast ==
- Jennifer Garner as Laura Pickler
- Yara Shahidi as Destiny
- Ty Burrell as Bob Pickler
- Olivia Wilde as Brooke
- Rob Corddry as Ethan Emmet
- Ashley Greene as Kaitlin Pickler
- Alicia Silverstone as Jill Emmet
- Hugh Jackman as Boyd Bolton
- Kristen Schaal as Carol-Ann Stevenson
- Phyllis Smith as Nancy
- Corena Chase as Mrs. Schram
- Brett Hill as Hayden

== Production ==
The screenplay is the debut of Jason Micallef. He submitted a draft of the script for a Nicholl Fellowship with the Academy of Motion Picture Arts and Sciences in 2008 and won. This was the first film produced by Jennifer Garner's production company, Vandalia Films. The script came third on Leonard Franklin's 2008 Blacklist of Hollywood's most popular unproduced screenplays.

The Weinstein Company acquired film rights shortly before production began. The film was shot in Shreveport and Bossier, Louisiana.

== Release ==
Butter premiered at the Telluride Film Festival on September 3, 2011. It also screened at the Toronto International Film Festival on September 13.

RADiUS-TWC planned for a March 26, 2012 release, but was moved to October 5. On its opening weekend, the film grossed $70,931 from 90 theatres, averaging $788 per theater and ranking number 43 at the box office. The film earned $105,018 domestically from only one week of release, with a widest release of 90 theatres. It earned $70,688 internationally, for a total gross of $175,706.

== Reception ==
Butter garnered mixed reviews from critics. On the review aggregator website Rotten Tomatoes, 34% of 67 critics' reviews are positive, with an average rating of 4.6/10. The website's consensus reads: "Despite its talented cast and a few funny moments, Butter's satirical aims are largely undone by a lack of subtlety and air of smugness." Metacritic, which uses a weighted average, assigned the film a score of 40 out of 100, based on 23 critics, indicating "mixed or average" reviews.

Peter Debruge of Variety gave high praise to director Jim Field Smith for his moments of upbeat comedy and honest dramatics, and Jennifer Garner's comedic performance, saying that "In another helmer's hands, Butter might have been a dark comedy; here, the humor is twisted but the world is bright as can be." Sean O'Connell of The Washington Post gave the film 3 out of 4 stars, similarly praising Garner for showing great humorous timing and Smith's direction of biting satire that falls just shy of the works of Christopher Guest and Alexander Payne, concluding that "But with Garner’s triumphant turn as a buttoned-down manipulator and Smith’s broad, scatological punch lines, Butter often proves it's sharp enough to . . . okay, I'll say it, to slice through butter." Joel Arnold of NPR found the film's satire a bit obvious in its message but said that it gets by with its cast of characters delivering strong humor, saying that "this is a movie centrally about a competition, and there Butter finds its comedic footing."

The majority of critics were more mixed on the film's script in terms of humor, performances and political leanings. Christian Shoard of The Guardian said that despite the minor roles of Schaal and Wilde, the film's confused parody of the 2012 Republican election elicits few laughs and a message that amounts to nothing, concluding that "there's something about this film's churn of goo and grit that lingers ambivalently, difficult to digest." Peter Travers of Rolling Stone gave the film 2 out of 4 stars, finding it too broad and lacking sharpness in its political satire and Garner's absurdly humorous performance barely getting any laughs, concluding that "she's stuck in a movie that wishes it were a Christopher Guest sendup but comes off like a cheap imitation."

Scott Bowles of USA Today felt the cast was wasted with cheap humor and underwritten characters, calling it "a film more enamored of its premise than interested in making it work." He gave it 1 and-a-half out of 4 stars. Sam Adams of The A.V. Club gave the film a D+ for using its premise as a failed satire mouthpiece to make lackluster jokes about the Midwest, saying that "Mostly, Butter is a venue for writer [Jason] Micallef and director [Jim Field] Smith to lob spitballs at people about whom they seem to know nothing, and care less." Ty Burr of The Boston Globe also felt the film lacked focus with its off-target satire and cartoonish characters, singling out Garner's performance as a "one-note caricature" that makes pot-shots at Michele Bachmann and Sarah Palin, concluding that, "It may play to audiences who like their satire cynical and safe, but the aftertaste of Butter is rancid."
