= Iowa State Fairgrounds =

- Iowa State Fair and Exposition Grounds Historic District
- U.S. National Register of Historic Places
- U.S. Historic district
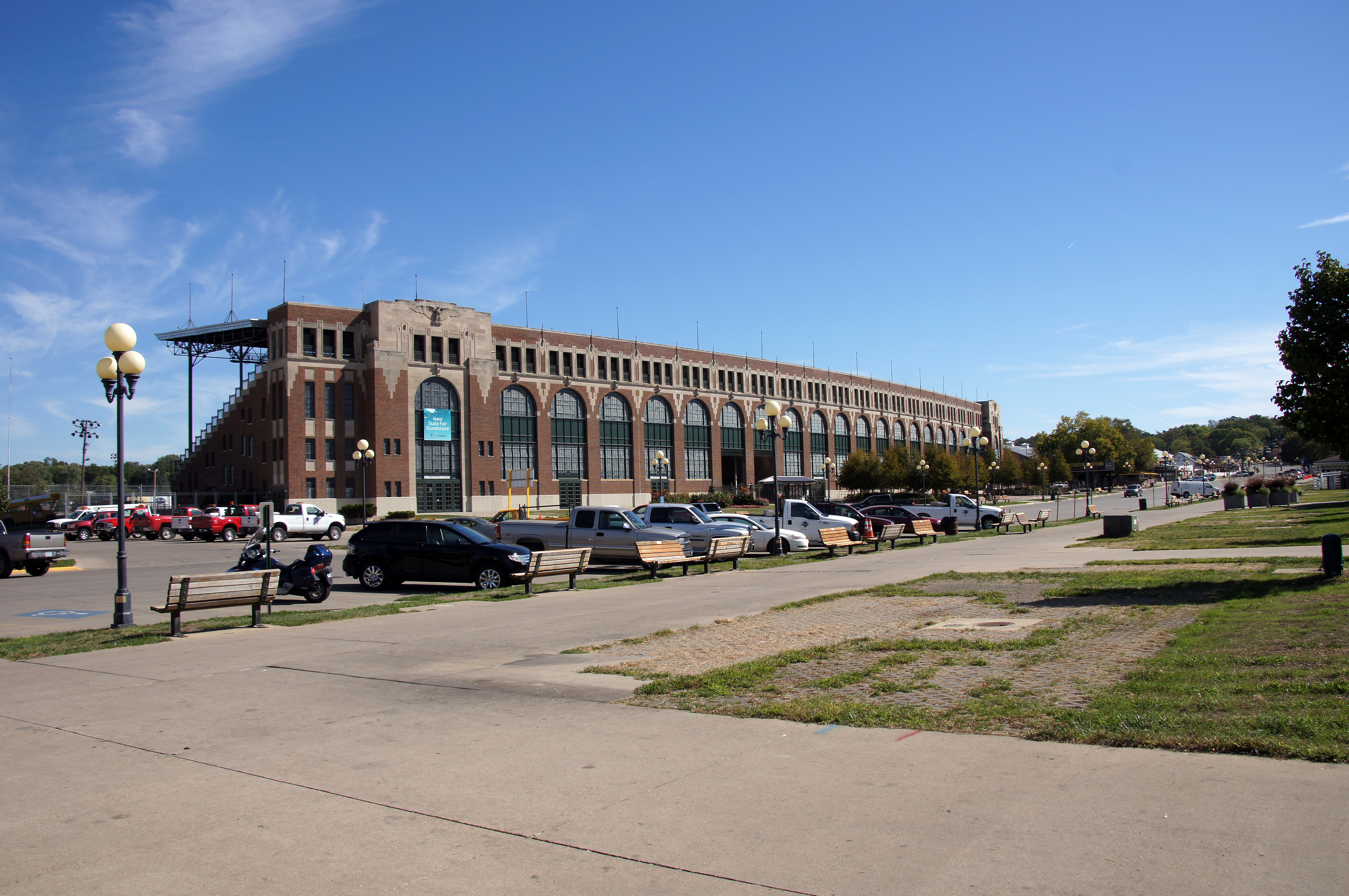
- Grandstand

- Location within Iowa Location within the United States
- Location: East 30th Street and Grand Avenue; Des Moines, Iowa, United States
- Coordinates: 41°35′43″N 93°32′58″W
- Area: 313 acres (127 ha)
- Architect: Various
- NRHP reference No.: 87000014
- Added to NRHP: September 14, 1987

The Iowa State Fairgrounds is located on the east side of Des Moines, Iowa, United States. It annually hosts the Iowa State Fair in late summer. The state fair was begun in Iowa in 1854 and the current fairgrounds were established in 1886. The fairgrounds were listed as a historic district on the National Register of Historic Places in 1987 as the Iowa State Fair and Exposition Grounds.

== History ==
The Iowa State Fair was held in a different community every two years after it was first established. The first fair was held in Fairfield in 1854. The other towns that hosted the fair included Muscatine, Oskaloosa, Iowa City, Dubuque, Burlington, Clinton, Keokuk and Cedar Rapids. The state fair moved to Des Moines permanently in 1878. The fairgrounds were initially located on the west side of the city between East 38th Street on the east, East 42nd Street on the west, Center Street on the north and Grand Avenue on the south. In 1886 the fairgrounds were moved to the east side of town on University Avenue. The property had previously been the Calvin Thornton Farmstead. The original house and barn are still on the fairground's property. Other structures from the farm survived into the late 1940s when they were torn down.

In 1886 the Iowa Legislature and the city of Des Moines appropriated funds and the first buildings were built. They were frame buildings that used boards and battens as exterior wall covering. They were mostly single-story structures that were built quickly and under a tight budget. Because they were poorly built they were constantly in need of repair. However, the buildings lasted into the early 20th century when they began to be replaced or expanded. Pioneer Hall remains from this period. The streets within the fairgrounds followed the same basic pattern as they do today, although they were unpaved and without curbing or gutters in the early years. A street lighting system was put in about 1890 when oil lamps were added. The following year 500 electric lights were installed on the grounds.

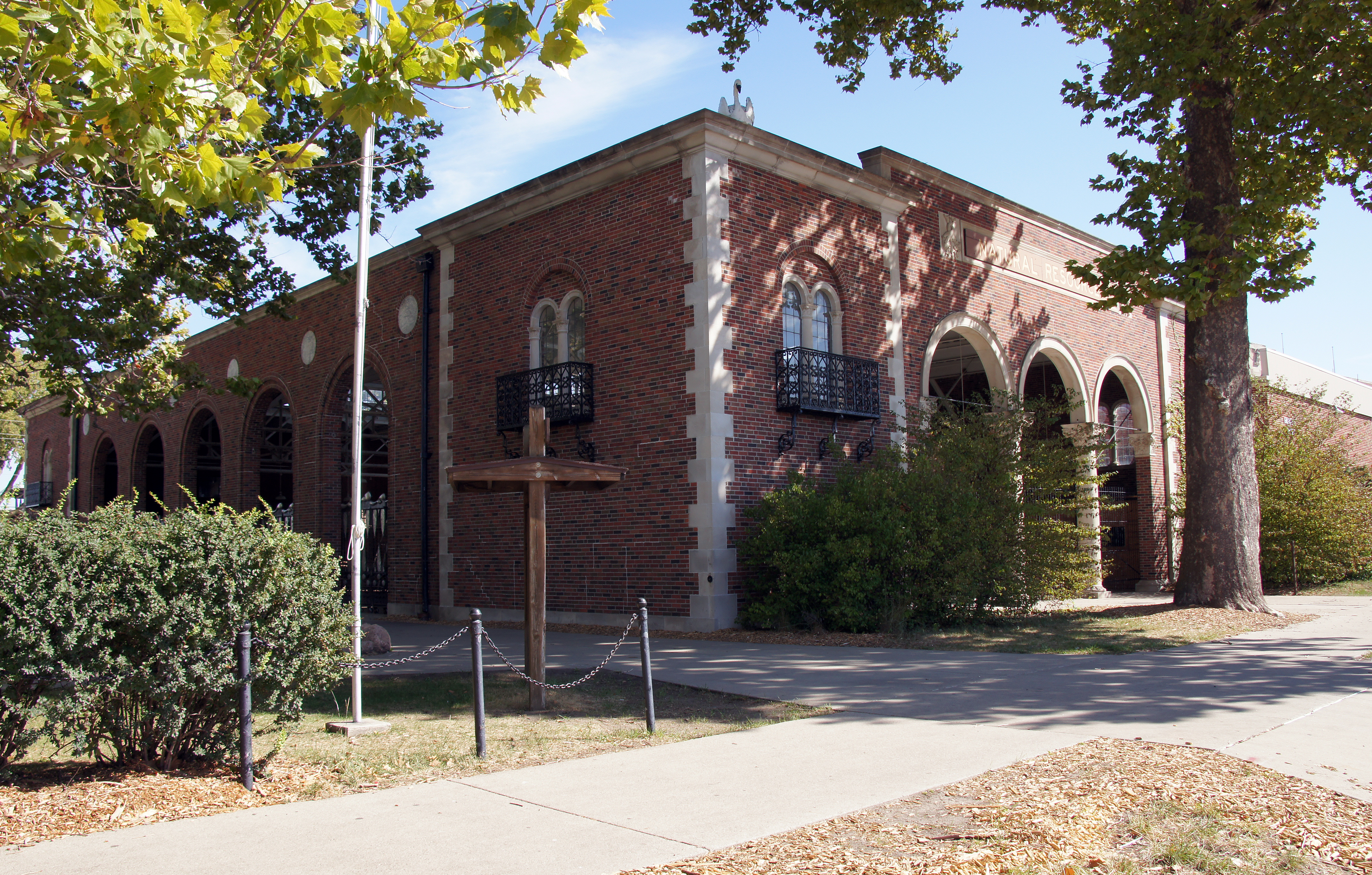
Fish & Game Pavilion

The new buildings built in the early 20th-century were steel frame structures covered in red brick. They included a new Livestock Pavilion that was built in 1902, Agriculture Building (1904), Administration Building (1908). A new race track and grandstand were built in 1909 and the Varied Industries Building was built in 1911. Some of the frame buildings from 1886 were moved to a different location and continued to be used. A sewer system was added at this time. The streets remained unpaved, but curbing had been added. They were also oiled to control the dust and cinders were spread to improve their durability. A park triangle had been established at the intersection of Grand and Rock Island Avenues by 1920.

By 1942 when the United States Army leased the fairgrounds for a storage depot for the Air Corps there were only minimal changes to the fairgrounds. The livestock buildings had been enlarged. Running water had been installed, bath and shower houses had been built at the campgrounds and restrooms were placed throughout the fairgrounds. Street pavement began in the 1930s and both brick and concrete sidewalks were added. Storm sewers were a Works Progress Administration project in 1936.

Since the end of World War II most of the buildings have been pole barn structures, although the exteriors, for the most part, are still covered in brick. Older buildings from around Iowa have been added to the fairgrounds in the 1960s and 1970s and are known as Heritage Village. Some of the buildings in the village are also those built on the fairgrounds in 1886.

== Fairgrounds today ==
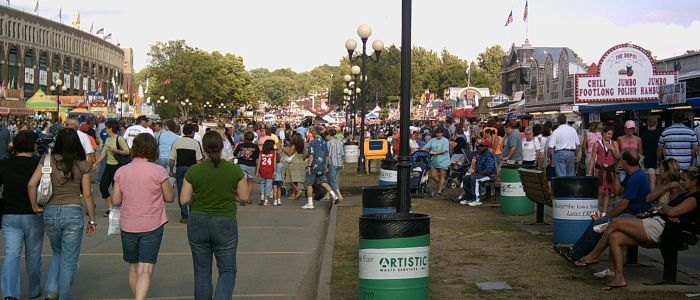
The Grand Concourse

The fairgrounds are composed of 435 acres (176 ha), of which 275 acres (111 ha) are devoted to the fair proper and about 160 acres (65 ha) are campground. The grounds are organized with activities grouped into departmental areas. The livestock departments such as cattle, horses, sheep and poultry are on the south; historically there was a railcar unloading area south of the barns, but this has since been decommissioned and cut back to serve a nearby animal feed company. The plant departments, which includes cash crops, fruits and floral are located in the center. The amusement area with the midway and race track/grandstand is in the northeast section of the fairgrounds. The machinery department is in the west and the campgrounds are in the east. There is also a street plan based on a T-shaped road arrangement. The east/west artery is Grand Avenue, also called the Grand Concourse, and the north/south artery is Rock Island Avenue. The eastern portion of the fairgrounds is hilly while the western portion is flat.

In addition to the annual state fair the fairgrounds also hosts auto shows, livestock exhibitions, flea markets, antique shows, concerts, trade shows and other events.

The Grateful Dead played two concerts at the Fairgrounds - the first in May 1973 and the second in June 1974.

=== Barns ===
The fairgrounds have a Horse Barn, Swine Barn, Sheep Barn, Poultry Barn, Cattle Barn and the Paul R. Knapp Animal Learning Center.

=== Varied Industries Building ===
The Varied Industries Building was originally built in 1911 as the Machinery Hall. It was renamed to the Varied Industries Building in the 1930s. It was fully renovated in 2001, and named the William C. Knapp Varied Industries Building. During the fair, it displays new products and designs. The Iowa State Fair Fabric and Threads Department on the second story displays Iowa's quilts, rugs, and dolls, and hosts an annual Sew-In.

=== Agriculture Building ===
The Agriculture Building was originally built in 1904. The butter cow is located in this building during the fair.

=== Heritage Village ===
A Heritage Village section depicts Iowa life around the time of the Fair's establishment in 1854, including church hymn sings, a country school, general store, barber shop, telephone company and train depot.

== See also ==
- Fish and Game Pavilion and Aquarium
