= National Junior Angus Show =

The National Junior Angus Show is the premier youth cattle-raising show held every year in the midwestern United States. The young farmers exhibit Angus cattle for prizes. In July 2008, it was held at the Iowa State Fair grounds in Des Moines, Iowa. Over 1,000 young persons aged 9 to 21 years of age exhibit, attend mentoring workshops, and compete, in this show, which has taken place for 42 years.

The National Junior Angus Show is an annual event organized by the American Angus Association. The show is designed for young people involved in the Angus cattle industry. The primary purpose of the National Junior Angus Show is to provide young Angus enthusiasts with an opportunity to showcase their cattle, gain valuable industry knowledge, and participate in various educational and leadership activities.

The event typically attracts junior Angus breeders, aged 9 to 21, from across the United States. Participants are involved in the Angus cattle industry and may come from diverse backgrounds, including 4-H, FFA (Future Farmers of America), and other agricultural organizations. Participants can engage in various competitions and events, including cattle shows, showmanship contests, skill-a-thon competitions, and educational contests. These activities allow young breeders to demonstrate their knowledge of Angus cattle, husbandry practices, and overall showmanship skills.

The National Junior Angus Show often includes educational seminars, workshops, and clinics conducted by industry experts. These sessions cover topics such as cattle genetics, herd management, and advancements in the Angus breed. The goal is to enhance the participants' understanding of the cattle industry.

The National Junior Angus Show is held at various locations in different states each year. In 2023, KSNB Local 4 of Nebraska reported that that year's show was the third to be held in Grand Island, Nebraska, attracting entrants representing over 1,700 cows.

The specific dates of the National Junior Angus Show vary from year to year, and participants need to check the American Angus Association's official website or other relevant sources for the most up-to-date information.
