= Jack Trice =

American football player (1902–1923)

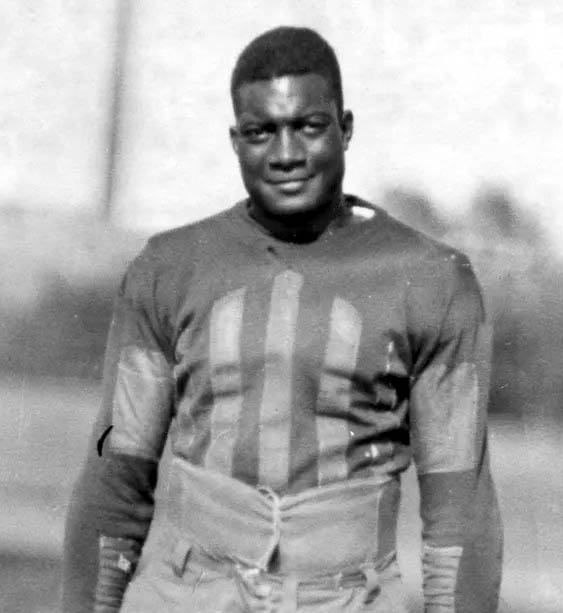

No. 37
- Position: Tackle

Personal information
- Born: May 12, 1902; Hiram, Ohio, U.S.
- Died: October 8, 1923 (aged 21); Ames, Iowa, U.S.
- Listed height: 6 ft 0 in (1.83 m)
- Listed weight: 215 lb (98 kg)

Career information
- High school: East Technical
- College: Iowa State (1922–1923)

John G. Trice (May 12, 1902 – October 8, 1923) was an American college football player who became the first African-American athlete for Iowa State College. Trice died due to injuries suffered during a game against the University of Minnesota on October 6, 1923. He is the namesake for Jack Trice Stadium, Iowa State's football stadium.

== Background ==
Trice was born in Hiram, Ohio, in 1902, the son of a former Buffalo Soldier, Green Trice. As a child, Trice was active in sports and demonstrated outstanding athletic skills. In 1918, Trice's mother sent him to Cleveland to live with an uncle. Trice attended East Technical High School, where he played football. In 1922, Trice followed five of his teammates, as well as his former high school coach, Sam Willaman, to Iowa State College in Ames, Iowa.

While attending Iowa State, Trice participated in track and football (primarily as a tackle). He majored in animal husbandry, with the desire to go to the South after graduation, and use his knowledge to help African-American farmers. Trice also was a member of Alpha Phi Alpha fraternity, and initiated through the Alpha Nu chapter (Drake and Iowa State University).

On October 5, 1923, the night before his second college football game, Trice wrote the following in a letter on stationery at a racially segregated hotel in Minneapolis/St. Paul (the letter was later found in Trice's suit just before his funeral):

My thoughts just before the first real college game of my life: The honor of my race, family & self is at stake. Everyone is expecting me to do big things. I will! My whole body and soul are to be thrown recklessly about the field tomorrow. Every time the ball is snapped, I will be trying to do more than my part. On all defensive plays I must break through the opponents' line and stop the play in their territory. Beware of mass interference. Fight low, with your eyes open and toward the play. Watch out for crossbucks and reverse end runs. Be on your toes every minute if you expect to make good. Jack.

== The game, Trice's death, and aftermath ==
Tackle Jack Trice and end Jim Snyder team up on Minnesota defender, No. 10 Hugh MacDonald, to open a hole for ball-carrier John Behm in the ill-fated game of October 6, 1923.

On October 6, 1923, Trice and his Iowa State College teammates played against the University of Minnesota in Minneapolis. On the night of the game, Trice and his teammates stayed at the Radisson Hotel, but he could not eat with them in the dining room.

In the third quarter, while attempting to tackle a Minnesota ball carrier, Trice ended up on his back after a roll block (a now banned play that is similar to the also illegal chop block) and was trampled by three Minnesota players. Although he claimed to be fine, Trice was not able to stand and was removed from the game and sent to a Minneapolis hospital. The doctors declared him fit to travel and he returned by train to Ames with his teammates. On October 8, 1923, Trice died from hemorrhaged lungs and internal bleeding as a result of the injuries sustained during the game.

There was a great deal of speculation surrounding the play that resulted in Trice's death. Iowa State teammate Johnny Behm told the Cleveland Plain Dealer in a 1979 interview that "one person told me that nothing out of the ordinary happened. But another who saw it said it was murder."

Iowa State dismissed all classes after 3 p.m. on October 9, 1923, in honor of Trice.

Trice's funeral was held at the Iowa State College's Central Campus in Ames on October 16, 1923, with 4,000 students and faculty members in attendance. His casket was draped in cardinal and gold (Iowa State's school colors) before he was buried. Trice's casket was transported to Hiram, Ohio for burial at Fairview Cemetery.

As a result of his death, Iowa State did not renew its contract to play against Minnesota for 66 years. The teams did not play again until 1989.

== Legacy ==
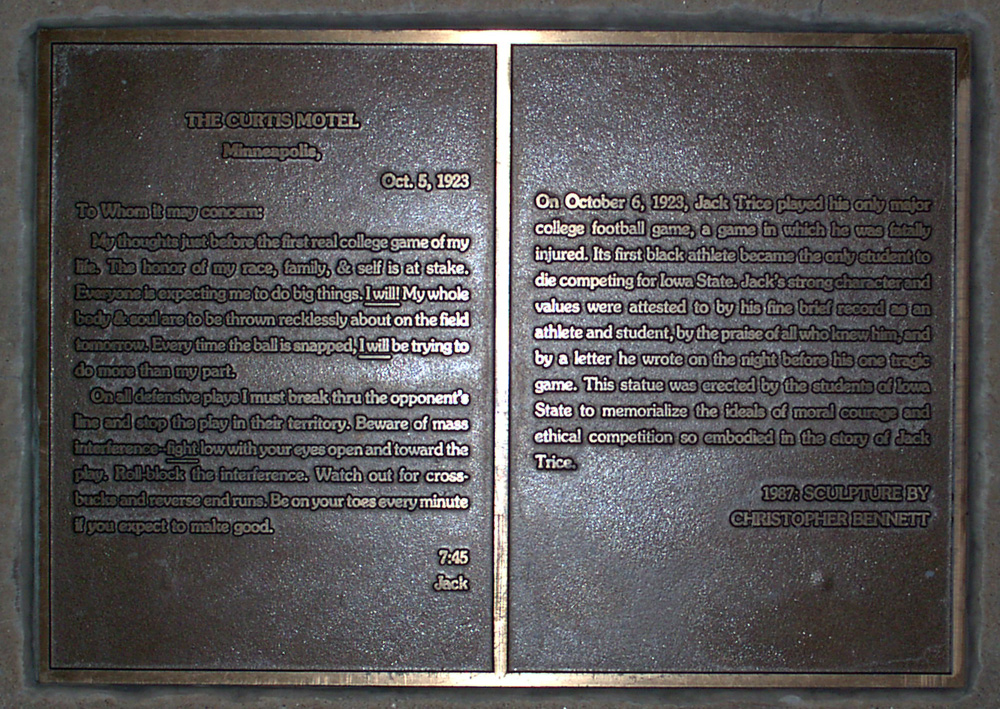
Plaque at the Jack Trice memorial near Jack Trice Stadium

In 1973, Jack Trice's legacy was renewed and a promotion began to name Iowa State's new stadium after him. In 1974, Iowa State University's student body government voted unanimously to endorse this effort. In addition, the Jack Trice Stadium Committee compiled more than 3,000 signatures from supporters. However, an Iowa State University ad hoc committee voted to advise then-Iowa State University President W. Robert Parks to name the stadium "Cyclone Stadium."

In 1984, the stadium was named Cyclone Stadium and the playing field was named "Jack Trice Field." The ISU student body government, wanting to do more to honor Trice, raised money to erect a statue of Trice in 1987. Due to the persistence of the student body government, students, alumni, faculty and staff, and other supporters (including public figures such as Paul Newman, and Nikki Giovanni), the football stadium at Iowa State University was finally named Jack Trice Stadium in 1997. Jack Trice Stadium is currently the only Division I FBS stadium or arena to be named after an African American.

Under former head coach Matt Campbell, Iowa State football made a major effort to honor Trice's legacy throughout the program. The team has adopted a striped, pentagonal secondary logo, an homage to the uniform design worn during Trice's era and worn on all uniforms. More recently, the Cyclones have added the phrase "I will!", in Trice's handwriting, to the rear bumper of their helmets. Iowa State's primary name, image, and likeness scheme is known as the "We Will Fund" as a tribute to Trice and his final message.

In 2015, the story of Jack Trice was being shopped around to movie studios with the hopes that a film is made. A successful stage play debuted in 2010.

Trice was one of three Iowa college athletes, each from one of the state's three public four-year universities, to be the subjects of butter sculptures at the 2023 Iowa State Fair. Trice was joined by Caitlin Clark (Iowa basketball) and Kurt Warner (Northern Iowa football).

Throughout 2023 and culminating in a closing ceremony on Central Campus marking the 100th anniversary of his death on October 8, a Commemoration Committee led by Toyia Younger (Senior Vice President for Student Affairs) curated various events to honor his legacy. Programs included exhibitions on campus and at the Iowa State Fair, lectures, grants, the renaming of the street in front of the football stadium that bears his name to Jack Trice Way, dedication of a commemorative sculpture titled Breaking Barriers by artist Ivan Toth Depeña, hosting a Jack Trice Legacy football game on October 7, and finally the presentation of a posthumous degree in animal husbandry accepted by George Trice, a relative of Jack Trice and ISU Graduate.

== See also ==
- Johnny Bright incident, a race-related on-field incident involving a player from a different Iowa school
- List of gridiron football players who died during their careers
