= Butter sculpture =

Sculptural technique

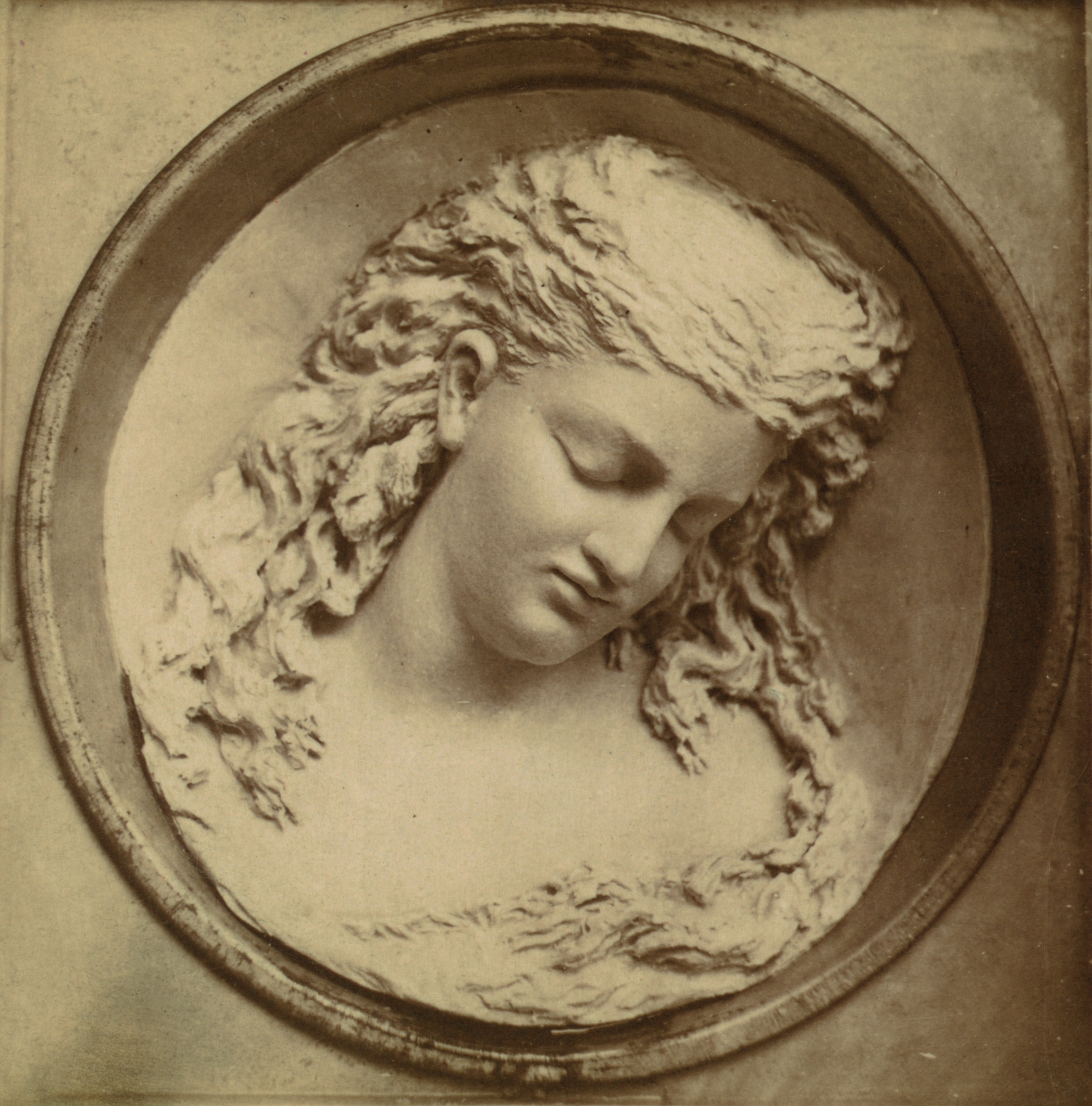
Dreaming Iolanthe, by Caroline Shawk Brooks, depicting Yolande, Duchess of Lorraine, the heroine of Henrik Hertz's play King René's Daughter. It was this 1876 masterpiece that ignited popular interest in butter sculpting as a public art form. The bowl was kept cool with ice underneath it.

Butter sculptures are three-dimensional works of art created with butter, a dairy product made from the fat and protein components of churned cream. The works often depict animals, people, buildings and other objects. They are best known as attractions at state fairs in the United States as lifesize cows and people, but can also be found on banquet tables and even small decorative butter pats. Butter carving was an ancient craft in Tibet, Babylon, Roman Britain and elsewhere. The earliest documented butter sculptures date from Europe in 1536, where they were used on banquet tables. The earliest pieces in the modern sense as public art date from ca. 1870s United States, created by Caroline Shawk Brooks, a farm woman from Helena, Arkansas. The heyday of butter sculpturing was about 1890–1930, but butter sculptures are still a popular attraction at agricultural fairs, banquet tables and as decorative butter patties.

== History ==
The history of carving food into sculptured objects is ancient. Archaeologists have found bread and pudding molds of animal and human shapes at sites from Babylon to Roman Britain.

In Europe, during the Renaissance and Baroque periods molding food was commonly done for wealthy banquets. It was during this period that the earliest known reference to a butter sculpture is found. In 1536 Bartolomeo Scappi, cook to Pope Pius V, organized a feast composed of nine scenes elaborately carved out of food, each carried in episodically as centerpieces for a banquet. Scappi mentioned several butter sculptures for the feast, including an elephant with a palanquin, a figure of Hercules struggling with a lion, and a Moor on a camel. Another early reference is found in the biography of Antonio Canova (1757–1822), who said he first came to his patron’s attention when as a humble kitchen boy he sculpted an impressive butter lion for a banquet - the story is now thought apocryphal, though it reaffirms the existence of butter sculptures during that period. Butter sculpting continued into the 18th century when English dairy maids molded butter pats into decorative shapes.

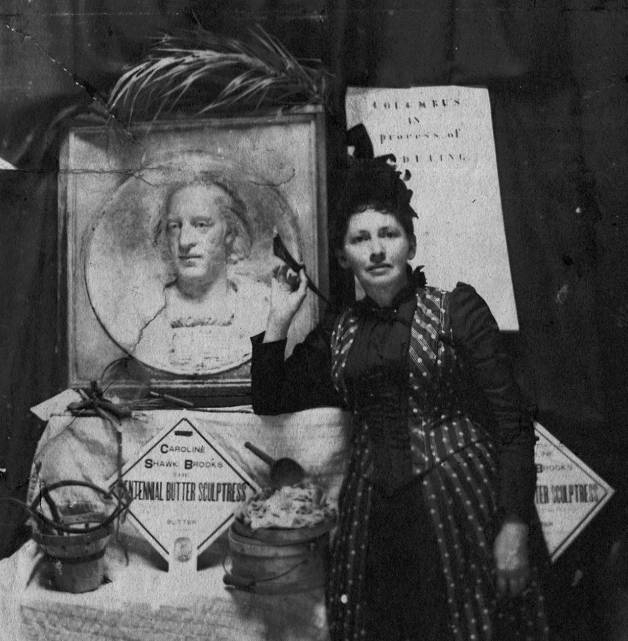
Caroline Shawk Brooks with a butter sculpture basrelief of Columbus for the 1893 Chicago Columbian Exposition.

The earliest butter sculpture in the modern sense (as public art and not a banquet centerpiece) can be traced to the 1876 Centennial Exhibition where Caroline Shawk Brooks, a farm woman from Helena, Arkansas, displayed her Dreaming Iolanthe, a basrelief bust of a woman modeled in butter. It was kept cold with a system of layered bowls and frequent ice changes. Brooks had no formal art training but as a farmer she spent years making butter and in 1867, to make the work more interesting, she began sculpting it, eventually using it as a selling point. As her skills progressed she began to see it as more than marketing butter, indeed as an art form unto itself. In 1873 she made her masterpiece Dreaming Iolanthe, which she would re-do over the years at regional exhibitions around the US. Thus she was invited to bring a replica to the Centennial Exhibition in 1876 where it drew so much attention and praise she was invited to sculpt live for the crowds. Afterwards she studied in Paris and Florence and eventually became a professional sculptor who worked in marble, but occasionally continued to make butter art. She returned for the 1893 Chicago Columbian Exposition and made busts of Queen Isabella and Christopher Columbus. By then, however, there were other butter sculptors: the art form had come into its own.

The heyday of butter sculpting was from about 1890 to 1930. During this period refrigeration became widely available, and the American dairy industry began promoting butter sculpture as a way to compete against synthetic butter substitute like Oleomargarine (margarine). Butter sculpting decreased during the Great Depression and WWII due to shortages but picked up again after the war.

== United States ==
The first butter cow sculpture to appear at a state fair was displayed at the Ohio State Fair in 1903, sculpted by A. T. Shelton & Company. New cow and calf sculptures are created each year, reflecting positive ideals and cultural trends in Ohio, and have become a Fair tradition.

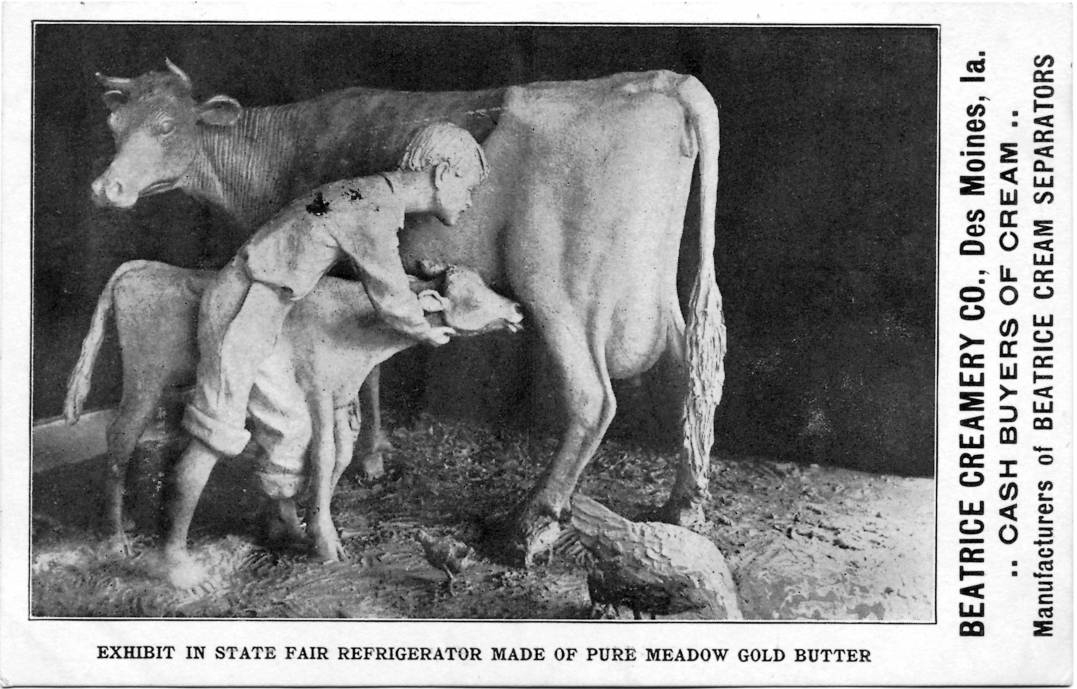
Postcard of John K. Daniels’s butter sculpture of a boy, cow, and calf. Iowa State Fair, 1911.

The first butter cow in Iowa was made by sculptor John K. Daniels at the 1911 Iowa State Fair. The sculpture was sponsored by the Beatrice Creamery Co., now part of Con-Agra Foods. The exhibit, designed as a way to promote dairy products in the area, was a big hit with fairgoers. Because of its success, the butter sculpture was continued each year. Over the years, several different artists have sculpted the Butter Cow for the Iowa State Fair. Daniels created sculptures and was followed by J.E. Wallace of Florida, who held the position until 1956. Wallace started making an additional butter sculpture for the exhibit each year. This second sculpture typically depicted people in everyday activities such as butter churning, or playing with a dog. This tradition has continued with each sculptor since. Earl Frank Dutt of Illinois became the third official sculptor. Dutt was trained at the Art Institute of Chicago and had experience sculpting many materials, from plaster and clay to lard. Over the next few years he sculpted cows in Iowa, Illinois, Wisconsin, and Michigan, spreading the love of the Butter Cow throughout the Midwest United States. His additions to each year's exhibit were far more cartoonish than those of J.E. Wallace, depicting such things as a fight between political party mascots or a parade of smiling pigs.

It was Dutt who trained Norma "Duffy" Lyon, now known widely as The Butter Cow Lady. She began her career as an assistant to Frank Dutt in 1959. The previous year she saw a photo of Dutt's creation and told the fair director she could do better. In 1960, she took over as the sculptor in residence—and first female to do so—and created a new piece for the fair each year until 2005. Some of her more notable sculptures include likenesses of Garth Brooks, John Wayne, Elvis Presley, and her own full version of The Last Supper, all made of butter. Duffy (a nickname derived from her maiden name, Duffield), as she was lovingly known, also sculpted Butter Cows for other states such as Illinois and Utah over the years. In 2006, Duffy retired, due to health limitations, and was succeeded by her apprentice Sarah Pratt. In 2025, the Renwick Gallery featured a butter cow sculpted by Pratt in its exhibit State Fairs: Growing American Craft.

The process through which the artists work varies according to the sculptor, but often follows the same general steps. Most start with choosing one of the six dairy cattle breeds (Holstein, Guernsey, Jersey, Brown Swiss, Ayrshire, and Milking Shorthorn) to recreate. Usually, they produce drawings of the cattle or take several photographs from which to work. As the sculpting actually begins, it is important for the butter to be of the right consistency, which has been described as feeling like cold cream. In total, about 500–600 pounds of butter is used. Over the years, sculptors moved from working in chilled rooms to large refrigerated display cases with temperatures between 35 and 40 °F. The butter is placed on a wooden-and-wire armature, at first in large amounts to achieve the general shape of the cow, and later in smaller quantities to fine-tune the form. The butter is added layer upon layer until the cow is in its finished form, taking between two days and a week, depending on the artist. Though the sculptors claim it was never a secret that the Buttercow is built on a wooden armature, many people assumed the sculpture was solid, and made entirely from butter, despite the logistical impossibilities.

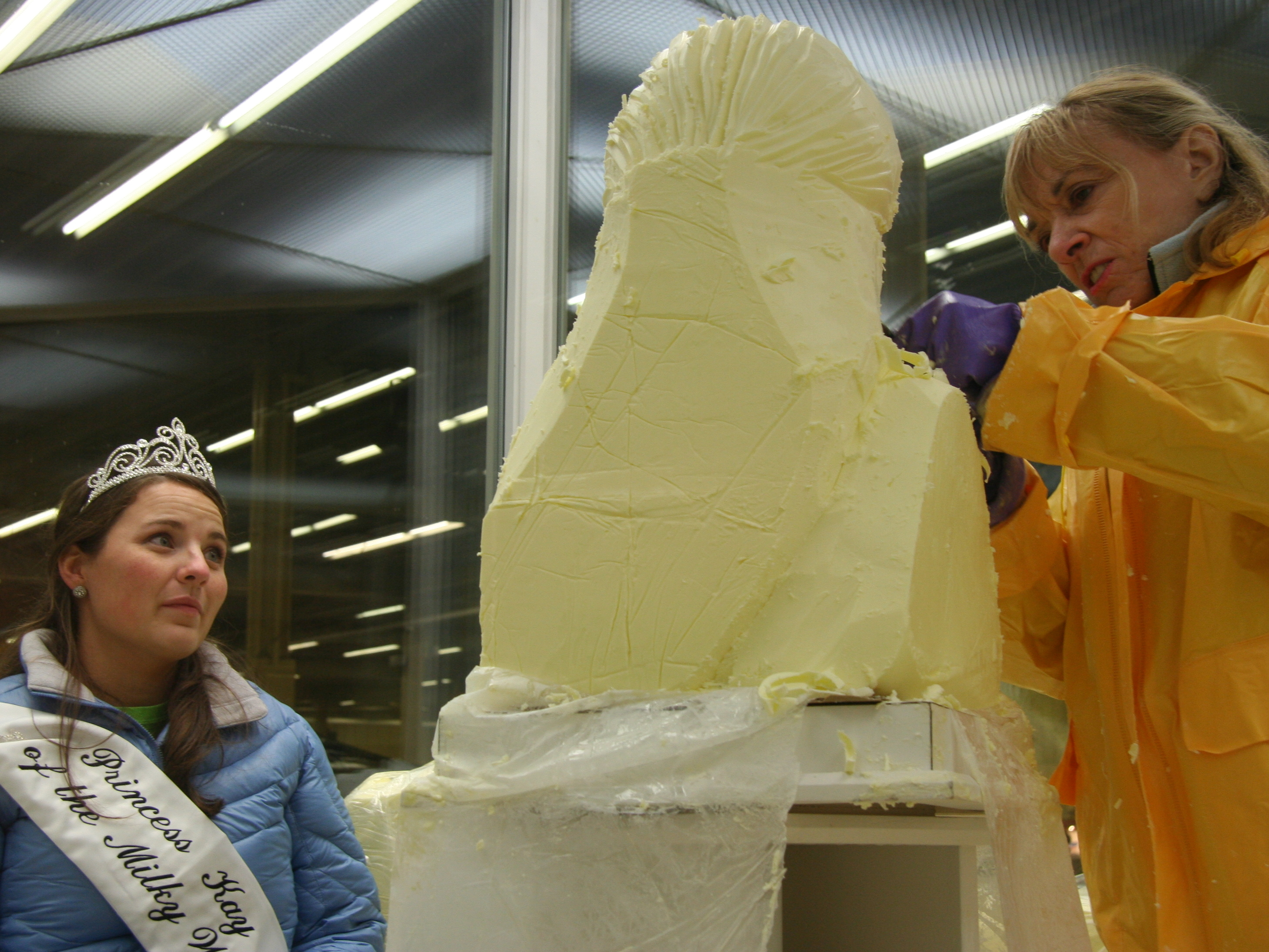
Linda Christensen sculpting butter at the 2010 Minnesota State Fair.

The Minnesota State Fair has never had a Buttercow, but showcases butter sculpture in another way. The fair commissions carvings in butter of the twelve finalists of the Princess Kay of the Milky Way contest. These finalists are chosen from young Minnesotan women between the ages of 16 and 23 to be Dairy Princesses. Their likenesses are carved from 90 lb. blocks of butter. Each of the twelve days of the fair one finalist will be carved, currently by Linda Christensen, a California sculptor originally from Minnesota. While a princess poses on a turning platform in a chilled display case, Christensen takes about six hours to carve her likeness, all in front of fairgoers, passing by the refrigerated display area. Once the carving is complete it is displayed for the remainder of the fair, and at its closing each dairy princess may take hers home and use it as she wishes (sometimes used at graduation parties or wedding receptions).

== Australia ==
Having seen the success of the Prince of Wales in butter in the Canadian Pavilion in the 1924 season of the British Empire Exhibition, in 1925 the Australians placed a larger butter sculpture in their pavilion at Wembley Park. It showed England cricketer Jack Hobbs being stumped at the Sydney Cricket Ground during the 1924–25 test series, which Australia had won 4–1.

== Canada ==
In 1924 and 1925 the Prince of Wales featured in two butter sculptures in refrigerated cases in the Canadian Pavilion at the British Empire Exhibition at Wembley Park, Wembley, north-west London. The sculptures were both displays of patriotism and an effective advertisement for the Canadian dairy industry. In 1924 the sculpture depicted the Prince standing beside his horse outside his ranch at Pekisko, Alberta. 3,000 lb (1,400 kg) of butter were used to produce the sculpture. The 1925 sculpture showed the Prince seated in the dress of a First Nations chief and was based on Edward’s visit to Banff in 1919, where he had been made an honorary chief by the Assiniboine. It was sculpted by George Kent and Beauchamp Hawkins. The figures of First Nations women in the 1925 butter sculpture case were the only reference to Canada's First Nations in the Canada Pavilion.

It is on record that the Prince was pleased with both sculptures. When Queen Mary saw the butter sculpture of her son she laughed and said it was "quite a remarkable likeness." The British press was impressed too, declaring the 1925 sculpture one of the wonders of Wembley. Others were equally impressed. One schoolgirl said that the prince of Wales in butter "was the one feature that captured everybody's imagination," while a schoolboy said that his favourite exhibit at the Exhibition was the Prince of Wales in butter, and that "an ear’d keep us a week." Some in the Canadian press were however unhappy about the 1925 sculpture, with one paper writing "it is time that Canada should cease to be advertised by representations of Indians in war paint.”

Shortly after the end of World War II, the Ontario Cream Producers Marketing Board and the Dairy Producers of Canada began a campaign to promote their products. Butter sculpting was initiated as part of this campaign along with the slogan "It's better with butter". This was intended to increase butter's market share in competition to the high-powered advertising for margarine in the late 1940s.

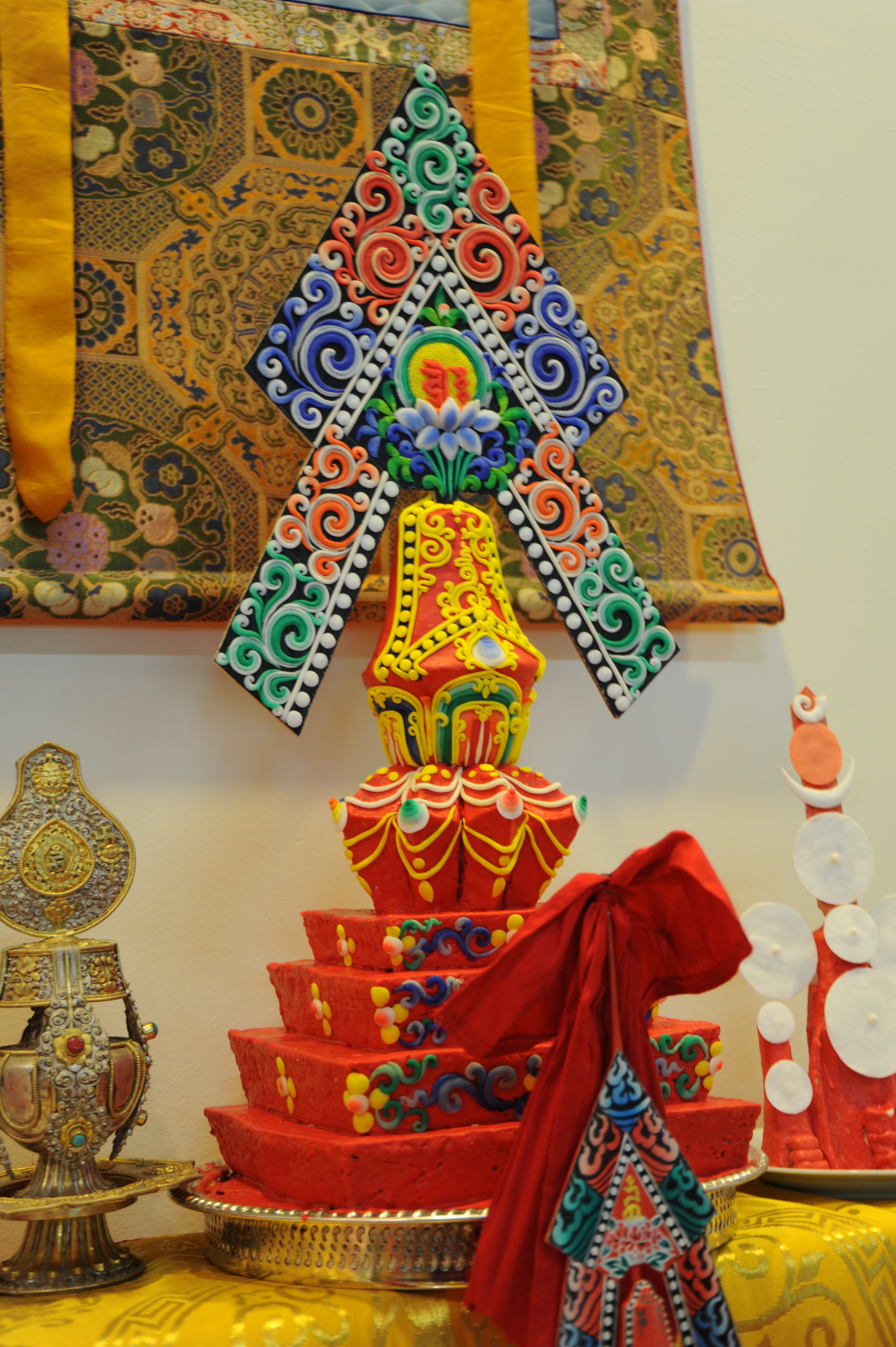
Tibetan Torma in Vancouver, Canada

Butter sculptures were displayed at both the Canadian National Exhibition and Royal Agricultural Winter Fairs in Toronto. Ross Butler was the first Canadian artist to sculpt in butter at these fairs. Ross' reputation as a farm animal artist was well known by the dairy people. He created many different life size butter sculptures between 1947 and 1954. Some of the subjects included Bessie the Butter Cow with her calf Buttercup, Barbara the Milkmaid and her butter cow, Ideal Guernsey, Canadian Olympic Figure Skater Barbara Ann Scott, Laura Secord and her cow, Royal Canadian Mounted Policeman and Queen Elizabeth II on her horse Winston. Each sculpture was life sized. They were created in refrigerated, glass cased enclosures and were displayed for the duration of each fair. At the end of the events, the butter was reclaimed and put back in the trade. The last butter sculptures that Ross created were Queen Elizabeth II and Prince Philip at the Western Fair in London, Ontario in 1956. After that, he returned to working in clay with the familiar subjects of cattle and horses. In 1986, a fitting tribute to Ross Butler at the Royal Agricultural Winter Fair included his likeness sculpted in butter by Windsor artist, Christopher Rees.

== Tibet ==
Butter sculptures (or Torma) are part of an ancient Tibetan Buddhist tradition; yak butter and dye are still used to create temporary ritual offerings for altars during the Tibetan New Year and other religious celebrations. They are normally brightly colored with dye, and include milk, flour and other substances. Ideally yak butter is used.

== See also ==
- The Butter Cow at the Iowa State Fair
- Butter sculptures at the Iowa State Fair
- Butter lamb
- Butter (2011 film)
