= Butter sculptures at the Iowa State Fair =

Comprehensive list of Iowa State Fair butter sculptures

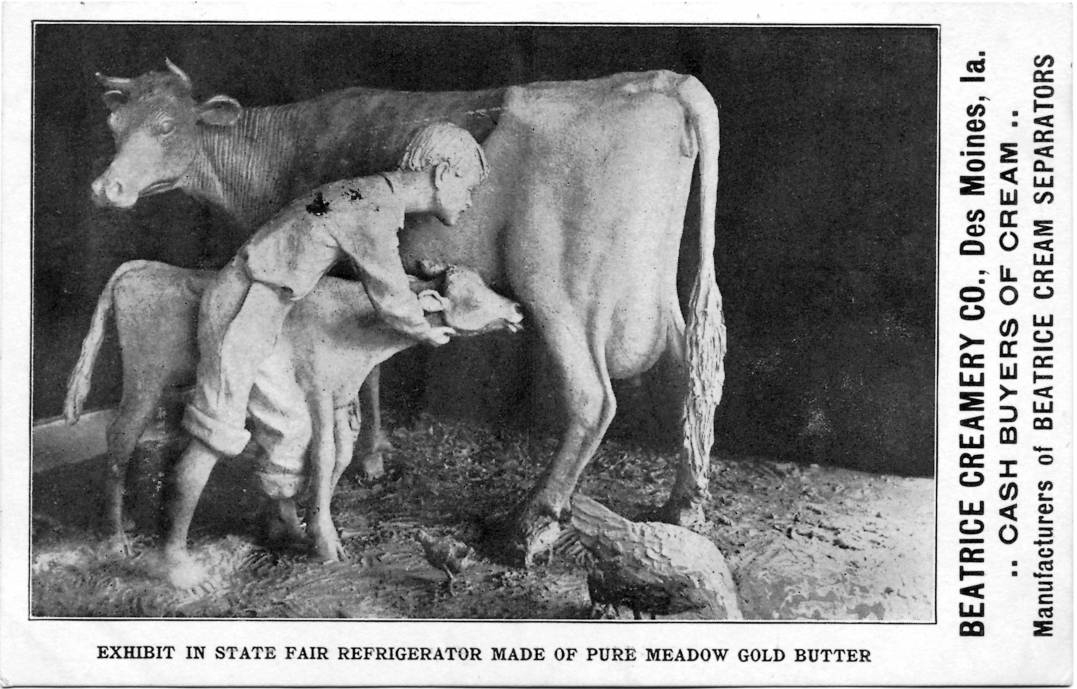
John K. Daniels' butter cow at the 1911 Iowa State Fair.

The butter cow has been an Iowa State Fair staple since 1911, when J.K. Daniels created the first cow. The popular exhibition, which consists of hundreds of pound of local butter applied to a wood and metal wireframe, is showcased in the coolers of the fairground's Agricultural Building.

== History ==
The Iowa State Fair butter cow has had just five sculptors in its more-than 110-year history. Daniels was succeeded by J.E. Wallace, a sculptor and taxidermist, who also created butter sculptures for state fairs nationwide, including Florida, New York, and Texas. Wallace sculpted the State Fair's butter cows for 36 years until his death in 1956. Earl Frank Dutt was the butter cow's official sculptor from 1957–1959

Norma "Duffy" Lyon petitioned fair officials to become sculptor for the 1960 Iowa State Fair; she would go on to have the longest tenure, sculpting the fair's butter cows and companion sculptures for the next 45 years. Lyon was succeeded in 2006 by Sarah Pratt, her apprentice of 15 years.

Pratt is State Fair's butter cow sculptor as of 2022.

== Companion sculptures ==
In 1994, Lyon won the fair's approval to create her first butter sculpture of a living person, country music singer Garth Brooks. Subsequent companion butter sculptures paid tribute to famous people, as well as historical, cultural, and current events, including entertainers Elvis Presley and John Wayne; athletes Tiger Woods and Olympic gymnast Shawn Johnson; a Harley-Davidson motorcycle, for the manufacturer's 100th anniversary; Grant Wood's American Gothic and Leonardo da Vinci's The Last Supper; and the 50th anniversaries of Star Trek, Sesame Street, and the fair's Sky Glider ride.

| Year | Additional Butter Sculpture |
|---|---|
| 1994 | Garth Brooks |
| 1996 | Grant Wood's American Gothic (honoring Iowa's Sesquicentennial) |
| 1997 | Elvis Presley |
| 1998 | An American eagle |
| 1999 | Duffy's own version of Leonardo da Vinci's The Last Supper |
| 2000 | Christian Peterson sculpting The Gentle Doctor statue (Petersen was Duffy's mentor and teacher.) |
| 2001 | John Wayne |
| 2002 | Peanuts Gang |
| 2003 | Harley-Davidson motorcycle (in honor of the company's 100th anniversary) |
| 2004 | Birthday cake in honor of the Fair's Sesquicentennial and an Iowa barn |
| 2005 | Tiger Woods |
| 2006 | "Mr. State Fair" Bill Riley (in honor of his 60th Fair) and Superman (Norwalk, Iowa, native Brandon Routh) |
| 2007 | Harry Potter |
| 2008 | Olympic gymnast Shawn Johnson and a tribute to four Iowans who changed the face of the world's agriculture: Etta May Budd, George Washington Carver, Henry Wallace and Norman Borlaug. |
| 2009 | Tribute to the 40th anniversary of Neil Armstrong’s walk on the Moon |
| 2010 | 50th anniversary of Dr. Seuss’ Green Eggs and Ham |
| 2011 | Replica of 1911 butter cow sculptures, including a calf, young boy and chicken. A sculpture of a young girl with a butterfly was added as a tribute to Norma "Duffy" Lyon. |
| 2012 | 75th anniversary of Disney's Snow White and the Seven Dwarfs |
| 2013 | A Tribute to the Historic Lincoln Highway (and President Lincoln) |
| 2014 | 25th anniversary of Field of Dreams, a film set and mostly shot in rural Iowa |
| 2015 | Monopoly's mascot Rich Uncle Pennybags - 80th Anniversary |
| 2016 | 50th Anniversary of Star Trek - Captain Kirk, Spock, Dr. McCoy, and Uhura |
| 2017 | 150th Birthday of Laura Ingalls Wilder |
| 2018 | 100th Anniversary of John Deere's Waterloo Boy Tractor |
| 2019 | 50th Anniversary of Sesame Street |
| 2020 | Canceled due to COVID-19 |
| 2021 | 50th anniversary of the Giant Slide (an attraction at the fair) |
| 2022 | The Music Man |
| 2023 | Kurt Warner, Caitlin Clark, and Jack Trice (Note: At the time of the fair, each subject was a former or current athlete at one of Iowa's three public four-year universities—Warner for Northern Iowa football, Clark for Iowa basketball, and Trice for Iowa State football. The year of the fair was also the 100th anniversary of Trice's death.) |
| 2024 | 50th anniversary of the Sky Glider ride at the fair: Jimmy Fallon, Steve Higgins and Johnny Carson, along with a replica of the ride's seat. |
| 2025 | 30th anniversary of Toy Story, featuring Andy's room |
| 2026 | State Fair Pepsi Clock |
