= Fish and Game Pavilion and Aquarium =

- U.S. National Register of Historic Places
- U.S. Historic district – Contributing property
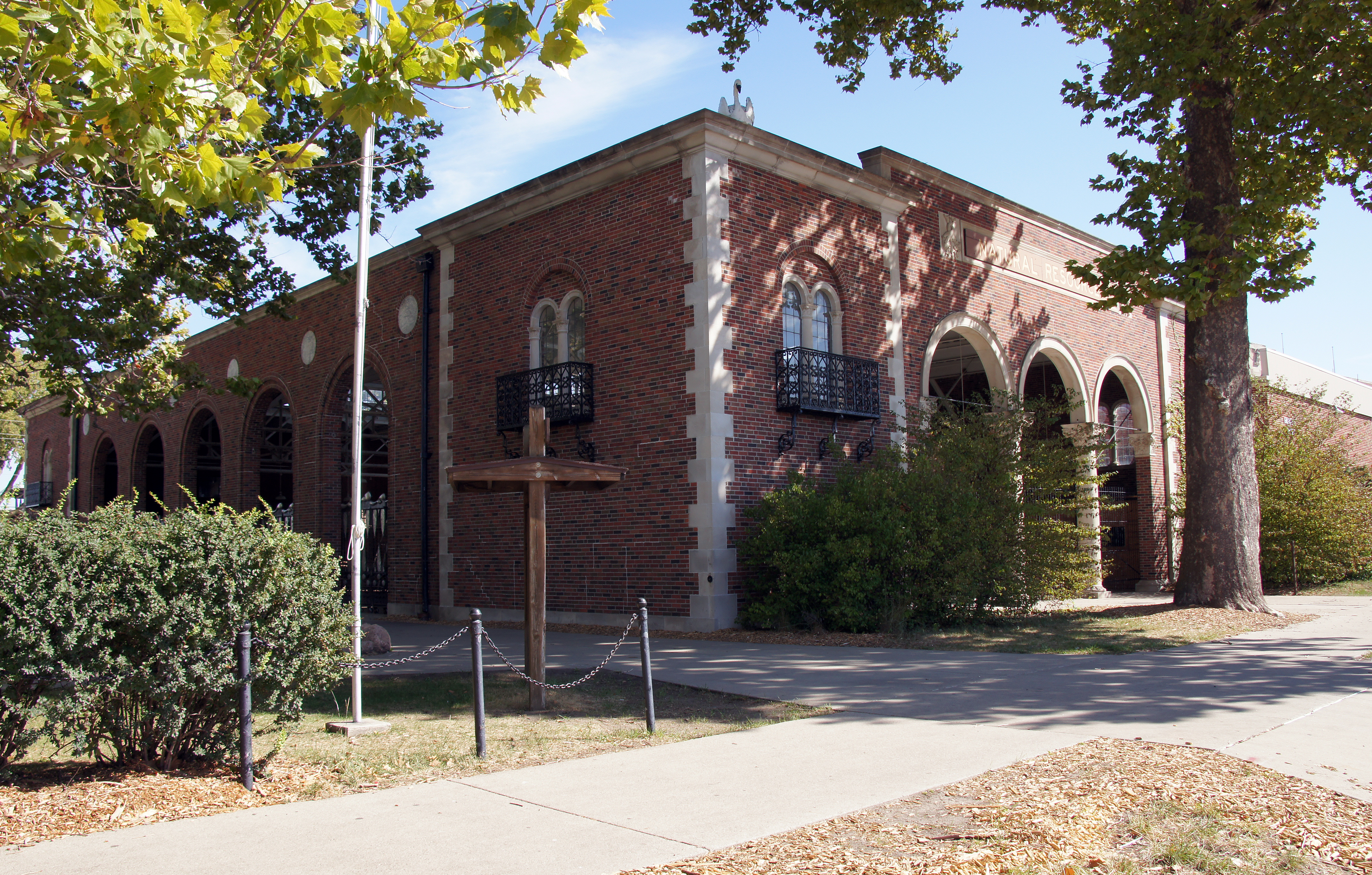

- Location within Iowa Location within the United States
- Location: Iowa State Fairgrounds; Des Moines, Iowa
- Coordinates: 41°35′45.9″N 93°33′23.8″W
- Built: 1926-1929
- Architect: Proudfoot, Rawson & Souers
- Architectural style: Late 19th & early 20th century Revivals
- Part of: Iowa State Fair and Exposition Grounds (ID87000014)
- MPS: Conservation Movement in Iowa MPS
- NRHP reference No.: 91001836
- Added to NRHP: December 23, 1991

The Fish and Game Pavilion and Aquarium is located in the Iowa State Fairgrounds in Des Moines, Iowa, United States. The structure was erected with financial support from the State of Iowa. It was designed by the Des Moines architectural firm of Proudfoot, Rawson & Souers. It is a masonry building with a steel frame structural system and exhibits eclectic, Italian Renaissance detail. It was originally built from 1926 to 1927 and was expanded in 1929. The building was listed as a contributing property on the National Register of Historic Places in 1987 as a part of the Iowa State Fair and Exposition Grounds and it was individually listed in 1991 as a part of the Conservation Movement in Iowa MPS.
