= Canada Pavilion, British Empire Exhibition =

Display area at the 1924–25 British Empire Exhibition

The Canada Pavilion was the Dominion of Canada's display area at the 1924–25 British Empire Exhibition at Wembley Park, north-west London. Like most of the Exhibition's structures it was built of ferro-concrete and designed by John William Simpson and Maxwell Ayrton, assisted by Owen Williams. According to the Metropolitan Railway's British Empire Exhibition number of its Metro-Land guidebook, the Pavilion was "an imposing building in neo-Grec style."

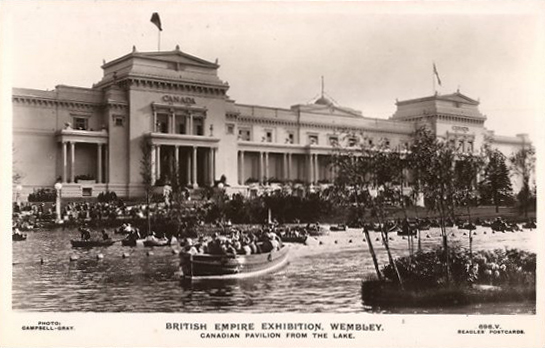
Canada Pavilion, British Empire Exhibition

The Pavilion was large, with a ground area of some six acres. It was painted white to make it stand out. Inside were displays on mineral mining, including of precious metals; sections on farming, the dairy industry and forestry; exhibits on Canadian industry; a section on hydro-electric power and displays advertising Canada as a holiday destination, including a working model of Niagara Falls.

On 9 May 1924 Evelyn Wrench wrote in The Spectator of the Canadian Pavilion's "wonderful panoramic views." However, probably the best remembered display in the Pavilion was the dairy produce section's butter sculpture of the Prince of Wales standing beside his horse outside his ranch at Pekisko, Alberta, preserved in a refrigerated case. In 1925 this was replaced by the Prince seated in the dress of a First Nations chief.

The figures of First Nations women in the 1925 butter sculpture case were the only reference to Canada's First Nations in the Canada Pavilion. There was also a lack of representation of French Canada.

The Canada Pavilion was flanked by two smaller pavilions for the Canadian Pacific and Canadian National railway companies. The CNR Pavilion was designed by Mr. Eustace G. Bird of Toronto, while there were bronze statues of a moose and a buffalo by the entrance of the CPR Pavilion. The two railway pavilions told the story of Canadian railways (and the CPR's liners and hotels) and further advertised holidays in Canada. Both railway pavilions contained a cinema. The CPR Pavilion contained an entire section devoted to Japan, one of the destinations served by its Pacific liners.
