= Fried Coke =

Fried Coca-Cola flavored batter

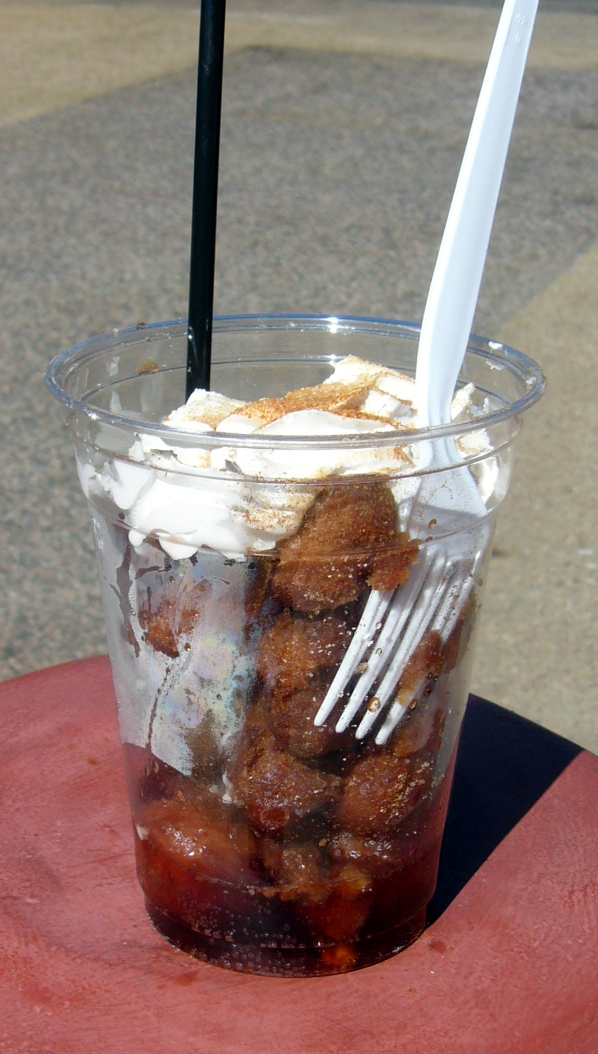
- Type: Dessert
- Place of origin: United States
- Main ingredients: Batter, Coca-Cola syrup, whipped cream, cinnamon sugar, cherry

Fried Coke or Deep Fried Soda is a frozen Coca-Cola-flavored batter that is deep-fried and then topped with Coca-Cola syrup, whipped cream, cinnamon sugar, and a cherry. It was introduced by inventor Abel Gonzales Jr. at the 2006 State Fair of Texas; Gonzales is also the creator of recipes for deep-fried butter and deep-fried beer at later Texas State Fairs. The concoction won the title of "Most Creative" in the second annual judged competition among food vendors. It proved very popular in Texas, selling 10,000 cups in the first two weeks. It quickly spread to other states, appearing in at least 47 state fairs in 2007; and now it is sold worldwide. It is unavailable in most European countries though. In 2009, Fried Coke was featured on the Travel Channel's Bizarre Foods with Andrew Zimmern. Fried Coke is estimated to have 830 calories (3,500 kJ) per cup.

== Variations ==
Since its introduction in 2006, several variations have appeared, using different types of soda and different toppings. A New York Times article published in 2007 about the Indiana State Fair mentions deep-fried Pepsi as being an innovation. In that particular variation, the balls were served with toothpicks and were described to taste "like a doughnut hole but with a noticeable Pepsi undertone." They were served with either cinnamon sugar, powdered sugar or whipped cream.

== See also ==
- List of regional dishes of the United States
- List of doughnut varieties
- List of fried dough varieties
