= Deep-fried butter =

Snack food made of butter

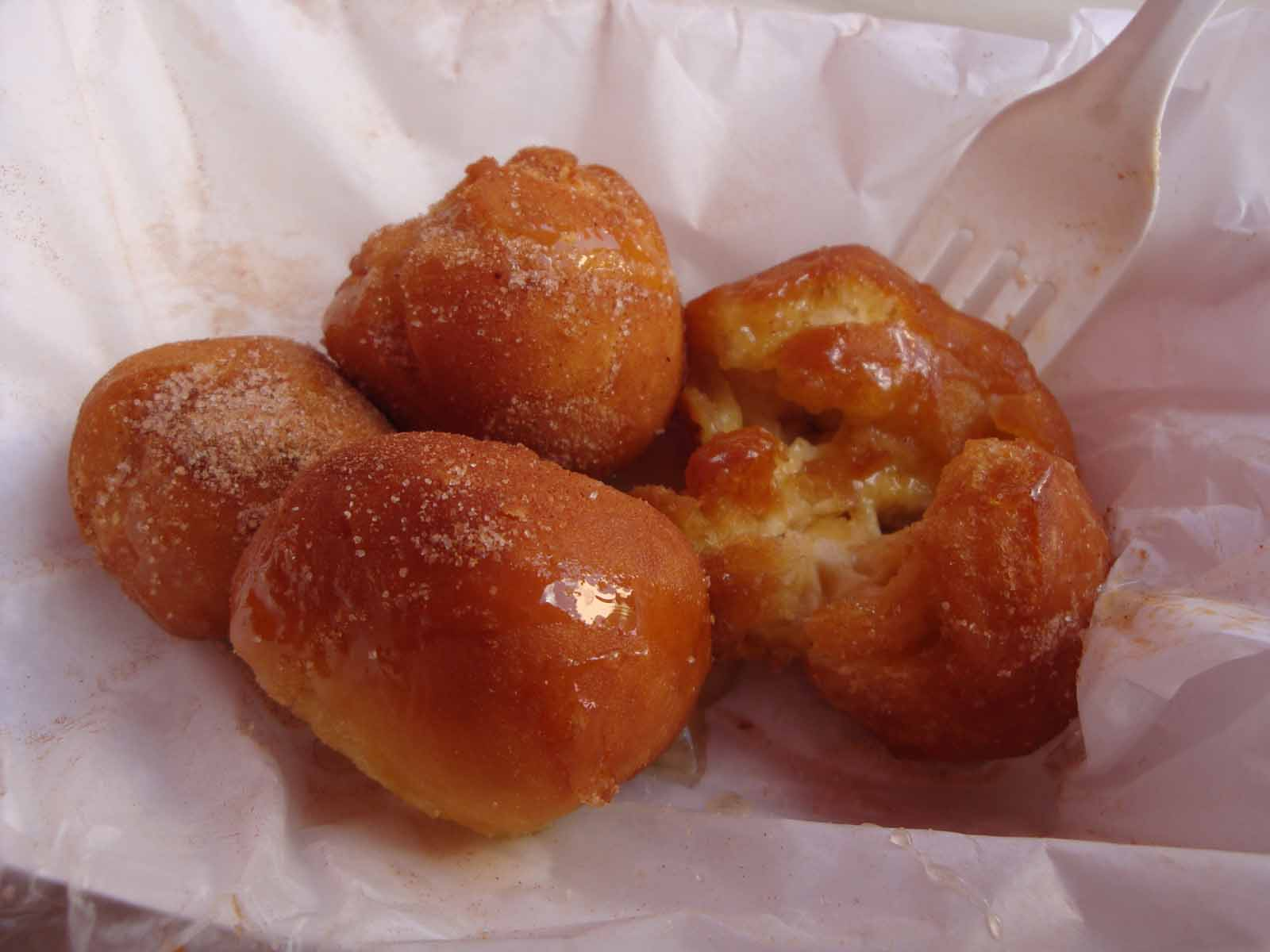
Deep-fried butter at the State Fair of Texas, 2009

Deep-fried butter is a snack food made of butter coated with a batter or breading and then deep-fried. The dish has often been served at fairs in the US; among them, the State Fair of Texas in Dallas, Texas, the South Carolina State Fair, the Iowa State Fair in Des Moines, Iowa, and County Fairs across Ohio. Roast butter is a similar dish, for which recipes exist dating to the 17th century.

== History ==
=== United States ===
Deep-fried foods are common at American fairs, and include snacks such as deep-fried Oreos. Abel Gonzales Jr., also known as "Fried Jesus", of Dallas, Texas, invented deep-fried butter, serving it at the 2009 State Fair of Texas in Dallas, Texas. Prepared using frozen, battered butter, it was awarded the "Most Creative food prize" at that time.

A version of deep-fried butter on a stick debuted at the Iowa State Fair in 2011, which was prepared using frozen butter that is dipped in a honey- and cinnamon- flavored batter, deep-fried until browned, and then topped with a confectioner's sugar glaze. This concoction on a stick was invented by Larry Fyfe, an entrepreneur and concessionaire at the fair. Deep-fried butter has also been served on a stick at the State Fair of Texas.

In 2011 at the Orange County Fair in Costa Mesa, California, deep-fried butter was paired with chocolate-covered bacon and dubbed the "coronary combo." ABC News made a comparison regarding the pricing of this food pairing, stating, "the $10.50 price rivaled some health plans' co-payments for a visit to a cardiologist." This dish has also been served at other events and venues, such as the State Fair of Virginia and the Musikfest music festival in Bethlehem, Pennsylvania.

=== Canada ===
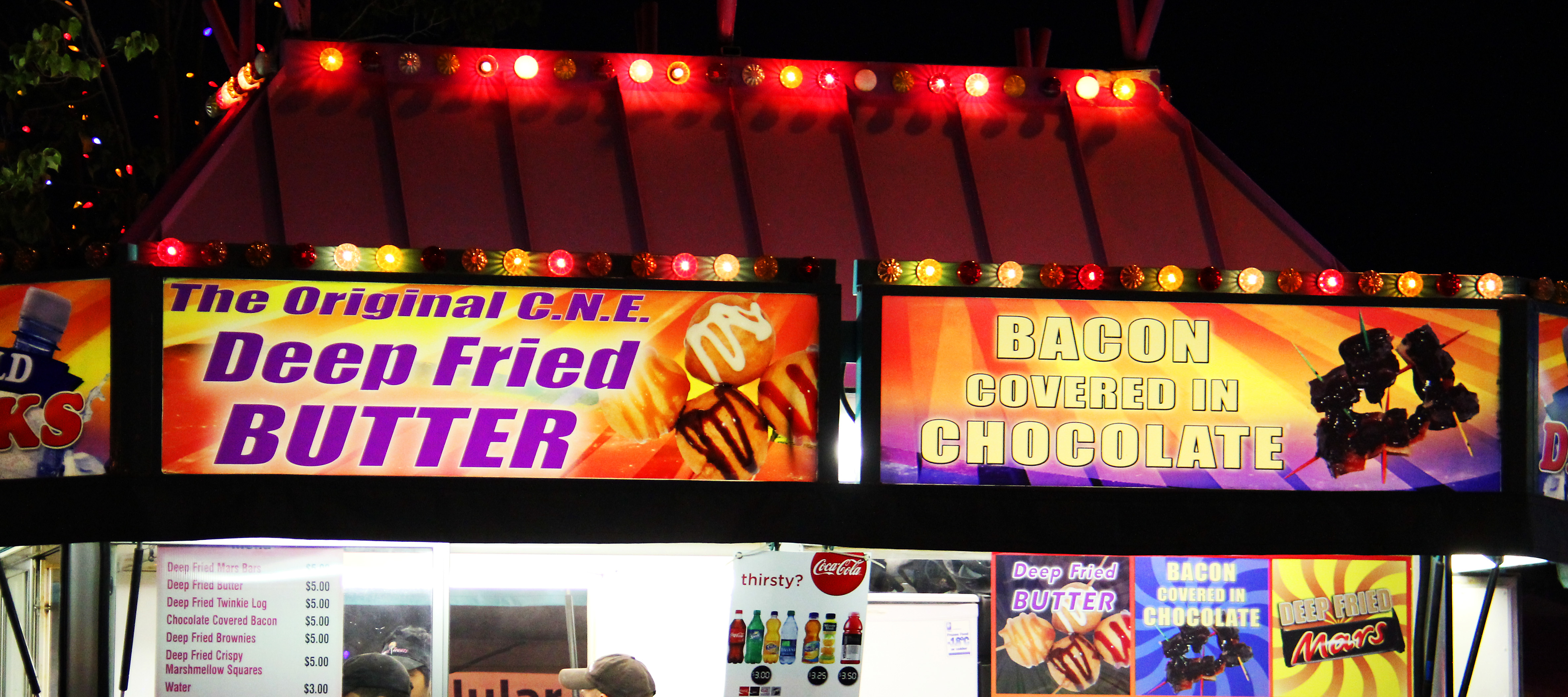
Food signage for deep-fried butter and other foods at the Canadian National Exhibition in Toronto

The debut of deep-fried butter in 2010 at the Canadian National Exhibition in Toronto, Canada may have led to a rise in attendance at the event. During the 18-day event in 2010, the concession stand purveying the dish sold 9,000 orders, which equated to 36,000 individual deep-fried butter balls using 800 pounds of butter. The dish was served in portions of four balls at the event, which totaled 315 calories.

=== United Kingdom ===
In 2011 in Edinburgh, Scotland, a pub named The Fiddler's Elbow served a dessert dish named "Braveheart Butter Bombs" that consisted of deep-fried butter served with ice cream infused with Irn-Bru and coulis. Some critics in Edinburgh have referred to deep-fried butter as a "coronary on a plate", but chefs at the pub have stated that when consumed in moderation it "should be all right". The pub also planned on offering a variation using whisky in place of Irn-Bru.

== Characteristics ==
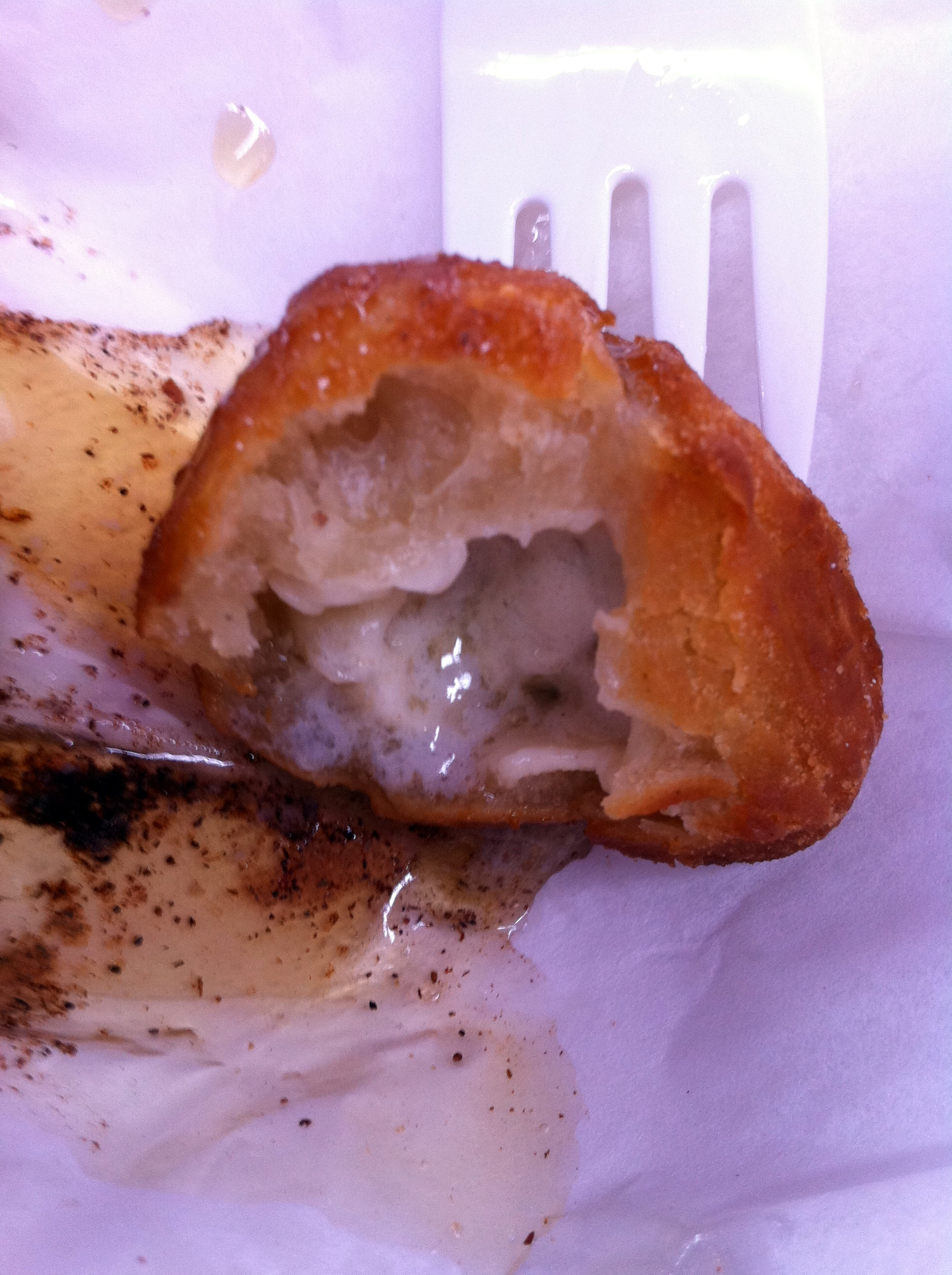
A cross section view of deep-fried butter at the State Fair of Texas, 2010

Deep-fried butter's flavor was compared to that of French toast, and described as tasting like "the most buttery bread you've ever had".

ABC News called it an "artery-clogging snack." Celebrity chef Paula Deen published a recipe for fried butter balls, which uses a blend of cream cheese and butter. The cooking time in this recipe is short, for only ten to fifteen seconds, whereupon the product attains a "light golden" color.

== Roast butter ==
Roast butter is a similar dish, for which recipes exist dating to the 17th century. A recipe appears in Arte de cocina, pastelería, vizcochería y conservería, a 1611 text from the Spanish cook Francisco Martínez Motiño. Titled "How to roast a butterball on a spit" (Cómo se puede asar una pella de Manteca de vacas en el asador), it mixed butter with sugar, and coated them breadcrumbs, turning them over a spit.

A similar recipe appears in Gervase Markham's The English Huswife (1615). Roast butter continued to appear in a number of cookbooks over the following centuries, including The Art of Cookery Made Plain and Easy in 1747. The recipe entailed soaking butter in salted water for a few hours, placing it on a rotisserie ("spit it"), covering it with breadcrumbs and nutmeg, and roasting it under a low fire while continuously covering it with egg yolks and additional bread crumbs. Oysters were recommended to accompany the dish. William Ellis, writing around the same time in The Country Housewife's Family Companion attests that the dish was being eaten Ireland, and provides a recipe "To roast a pound of butter or more the Irish Way", seasoning butter with salt and coating it with oatmeal. He says of the dish being a Christmas custom in the country:

A certain Irish woman told me this eats very nicely, insomuch that she has done on a Christmas Eve twenty-seven different pounds so, at a farmer’s house in her country, where it has been kept all the holidays, to accommodate a friend with a slice or two, as we do cakes or minced pies here.

In 19th-century France, Alexandre Dumas gave another recipe for the dish, noting it as à la Landais and supplied by Dionysius Joseph Vuillemot. The recipe calls for butter to be repeatedly rolled in beaten eggs and rolled in breadcrumbs. This is cooked on a spit, and served with oysters and old Barsac wine.

== See also ==
- Fried Coke – introduced by inventor Abel Gonzales, Jr. at the 2006 State Fair of Texas
- List of deep-fried foods
