= Abel Gonzales =

American chef of deep fried foods

- Born: Abel Gonzalezs Jr. November 1969 (age 56–57); Dallas, Texas, US
- Other name: Fried Jesus
- Known for: Deep fried food

Abel Gonzales Jr. (born November 1969), also known as Fried Jesus, is an "extreme fryer" and the five-time winner of Big Tex Choice Awards, an annual contest at the Texas State Fair, and the inventor of several deep fried items including Fried Coke, deep-fried butter and deep-fried turkey ribs. He has also been a judge on the television show Deep Fry Masters.

== Early life ==
The son of a Tex-Mex restaurateur, Gonzales was born in Dallas, Texas, in November 1969. In his youth he grew up working long hours around his father's restaurant, A. J. Gonzales’ Mexican Oven and graduated from Woodrow Wilson High School where he was later inducted into their hall of fame in 2014.

== Career ==
Gonzales worked as a database analyst before quitting his job in 2009 to work selling his deep fried foods at the Texas state fair. This allows him to spend the rest of the year traveling and experimenting with new forms of deep fried foods. He has also been hired previously by a beer distribution company to create a variant of deep fried beer. In 2014, he became a judge on the deep fried themed cooking show Deep Fry Masters.

In 2017, Gonzales opened a Dallas restaurant called Republic Ranch which featured "a blending of Mexican food and barbecue". It featured tacos with fillings such as ribeye and pulled pork as well as fried chicken and brisket. Gonzales left Ranch Republic in 2018 and the following year opened a New York-style Italian cuisine restaurant called Cocina Italiano in Dallas. It focuses on low cost pastas, sandwiches, and salads similar to food he encountered in New York City and Boston.

=== State Fair of Texas ===
Since 2004, Gonzales has been entering into the Big Tex Choice Award contest, a contest for the most creative deep fried food, and has been a finalist every year except for 2014. He has won the contest five times in categories such as "best taste" and "most creative" with multiple deep fried inventions. In 2004, he won with the fried peanut butter and jelly sandwich, in 2005 with Fried Coke, in 2006 with fried cookie dough, in 2008 with deep-fried butter, and in 2011 with Fried Jambalaya. Other finalist inventions have included chicken-fried cactus bites, jelly and banana sandwiches, and deep fried pineapple rings.
