= Torma =

Tibetan Buddhist sculptures used in rituals and offerings

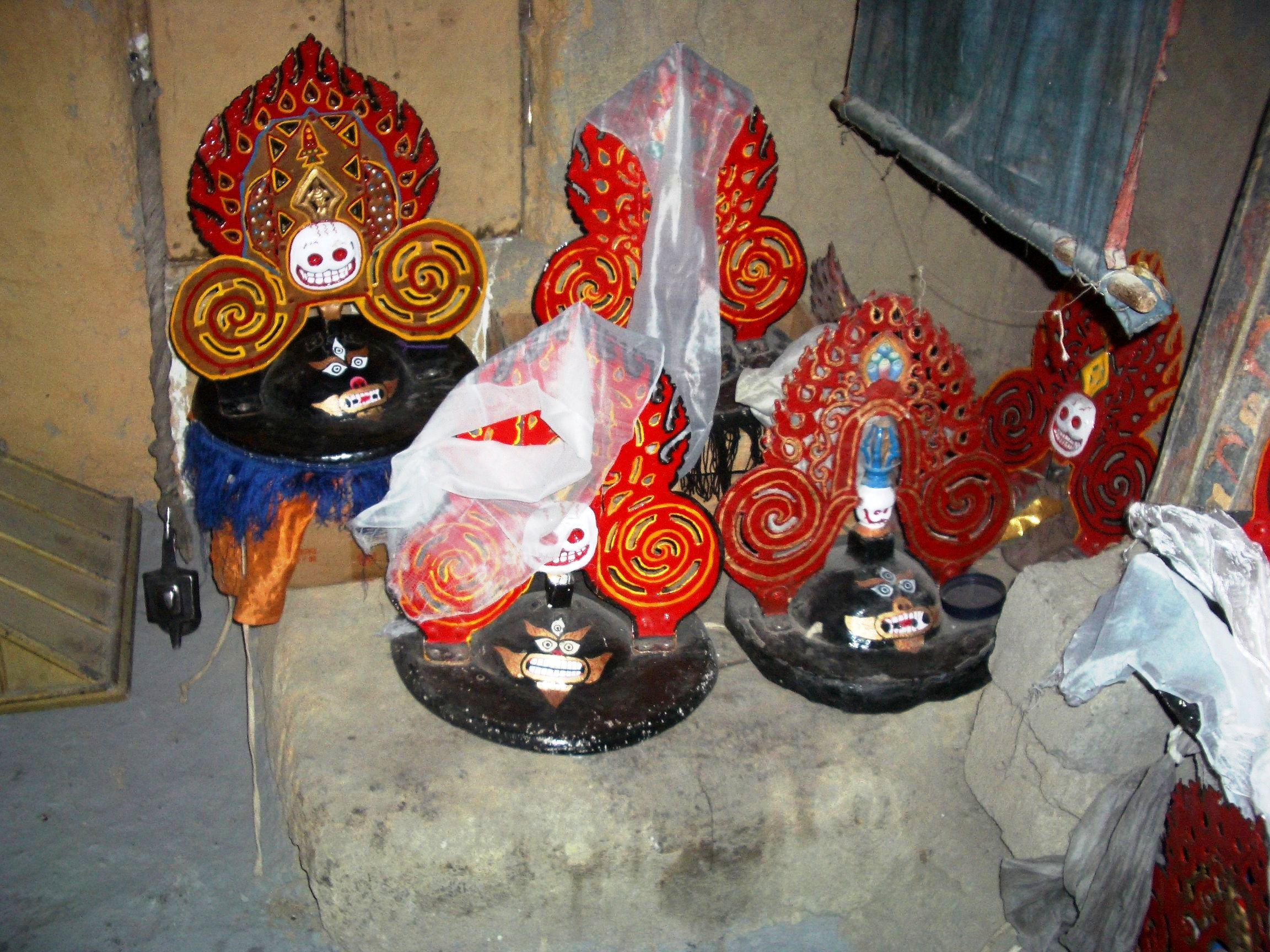
Torma or butter sculptures, Dhankar Gompa, Spiti

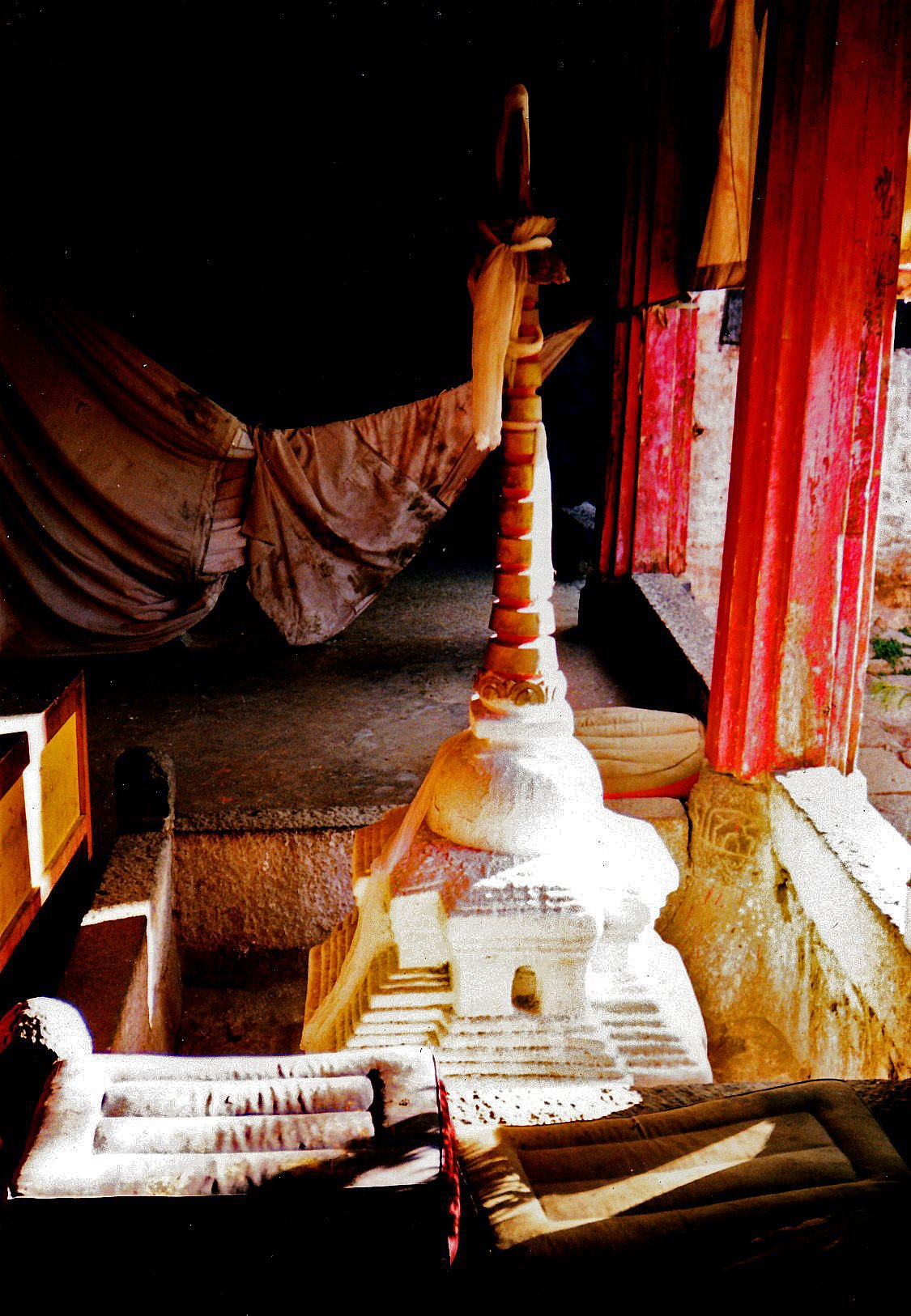
Torma, Ralung Monastery, Tibet, 1993

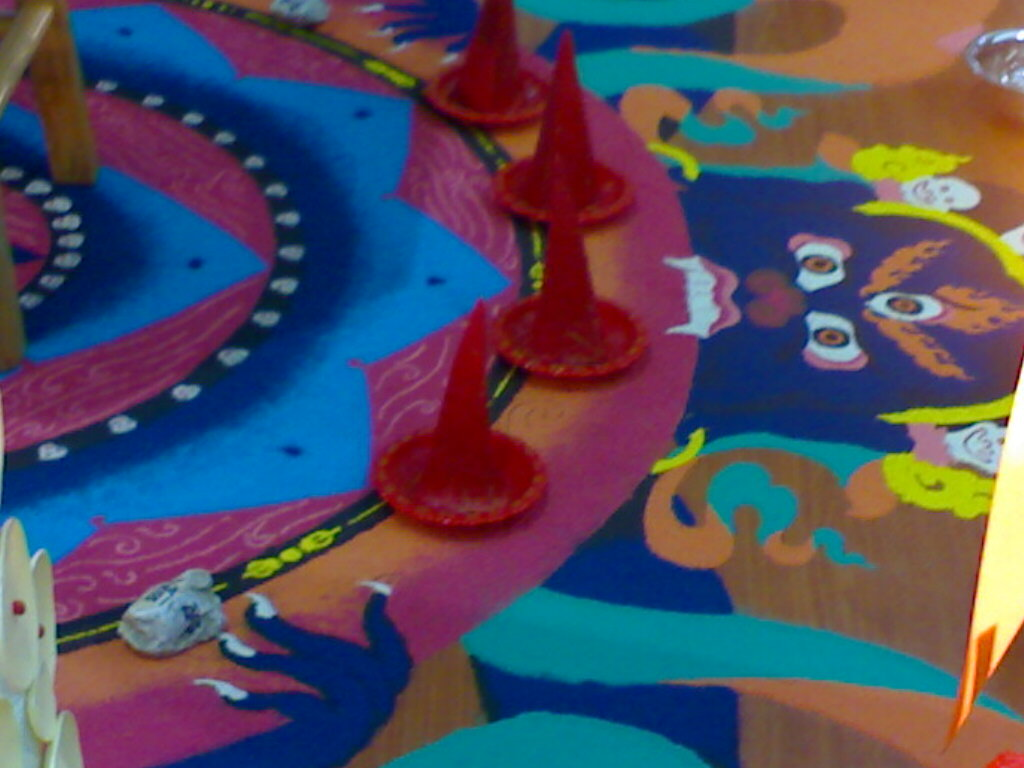
Torma cakes offered on the sand mandala

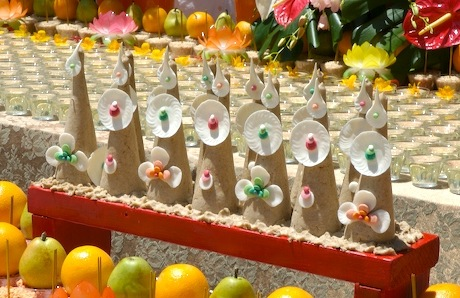
Tormas on a shrine

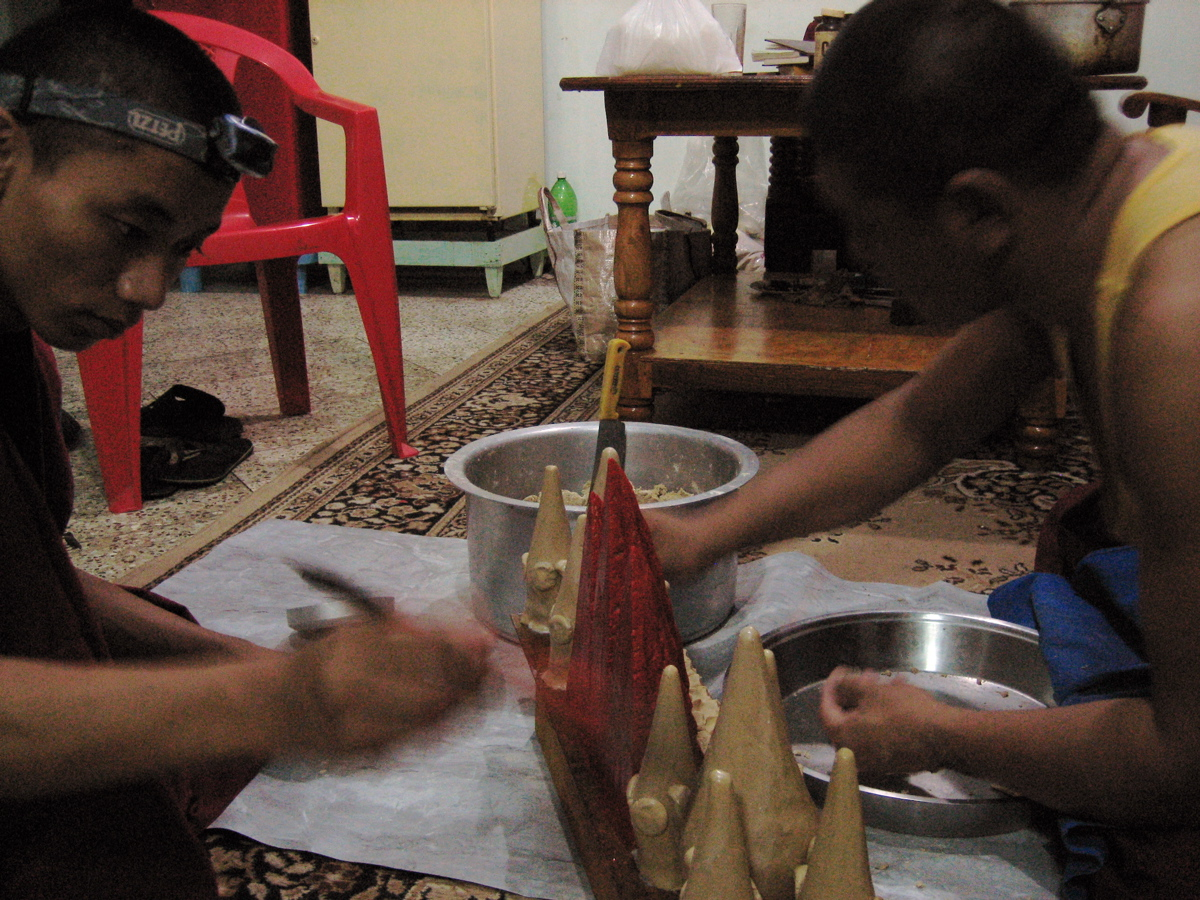
Making tormas

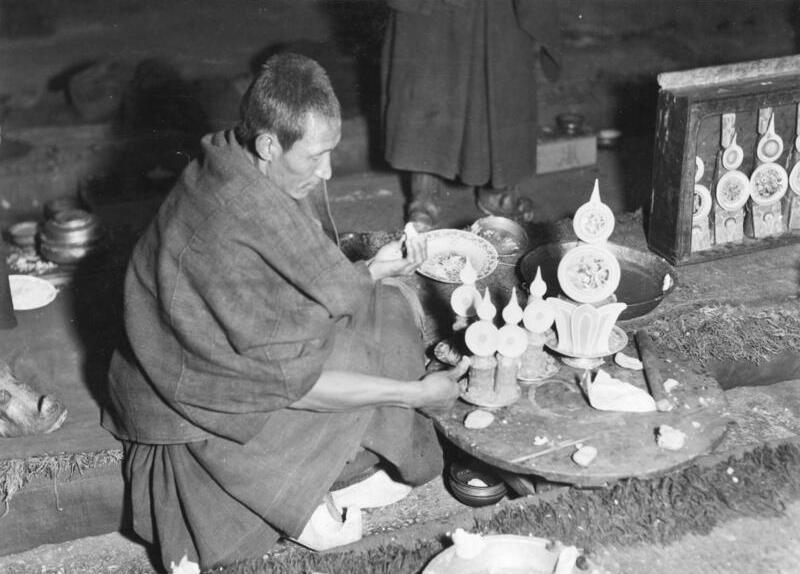
Monk making tormas in Sera Monastery in 1939

Torma (Skt: Balingta, Tibetan: གཏོར་མ, Wylie: gtor ma; Tor-ma) are sculptures made mostly of flour and butter used in tantric rituals or as offerings in Tibetan Buddhism. They may be dyed in different colors, often with white or red for the main body of the torma. They are made in specific shapes based on their purpose, usually conical in form. A very large, central shrine torma may be constructed for festivals, though typically they are small and placed directly on a shrine, on a plate, mounted on leather or held on a special base such as a skull.

== History ==
The tradition of offering cakes pre-dates Tibetan Buddhism, though traditional Indian offering cakes — called bali or balingha in Sanskrit — are flat instead of conical.

The Tibetan term comes from the root gtor-ba which means to "cast away, break up, or scatter". This implies both a sense of offering and of letting go or non-attachment.

== Variations ==
Tormas have different uses. Some are created and placed on shrines for ceremonies or to represent deities. Others are used in feast practice and consumed by practitioners during the practice. Others are made to appease spirits, accumulate merit, or remove obstacles. They are mostly made of barley flour and butter, but traditionally other ingredients such as egg, milk, sugar, honey, and even meat may be included depending upon the purpose of the torma.

=== Deity tormas ===
Deity tormas (Wylie: rten gtor) are kept on the shrine, and represent a particular tantric deity. These tormas vary in complexity from a very simple cone painted white for peaceful deities like Tara and Avalokiteshvara, to very complex designs for semi-wrathful deities like Vajrayogini and Chakrasamvara.

=== Food tormas ===
Food tormas (Wylie: skang gtor) are used in feast practices and are partially consumed by practitioners during the feast, with leftovers (Wylie: dme gtor) offered to lower beings after being blessed. In some traditions, food tormas are now made with more contemporary ingredients whereas others stay faithful to the barley flour tradition.

=== Offering tormas ===
Offering tormas may be made for and offered to deities (Wylie: sgrub gtor / mchod gtor), to Dharma Protectors, to obstructing spirits, or to other lower beings. Torma for obstructing spirits are called gektor (Wylie: gegs gtor).

=== Medicinal torma ===
A torma may be used in Tibetan medicine to extract an illness from a patient as a cure. The torma is then cast away.

=== Captured torma ===
A captured torma (Wylie: gta' gtor) may be used to speed completion of activities, by planning to offer the torma at the completion of the activity thereby encouraging successful activity.

=== Inner, secret and very secret torma ===
Practicing meditation with deity visualization is considered a form of torma offering, though no physical cake is created and then offered. Similarly, offering one's internal emotional and mental experiences and experience of suchness are non-physical forms of torma offerings.

== See also ==
- Butter sculpture
