= Norma Lyon =

American farmer and artist

Norma Duffield Stong "Duffy" Lyon (July 29, 1929 – June 26, 2011) was an American farmer and artist nicknamed The Butter Cow Lady. She was known for creating elaborate butter sculptures at the Iowa State Fair from 1960 until 2006, when she retired. She also produced sculptures on commission for politicians and celebrities, as well as for other state fairs.

== Early years ==
Lyon was born in Nashville, Tennessee on July 29, 1929, the daughter of Benton J. Stong, a newspaper reporter, and his wife, Elsa. Her grandmother, Bertha Clark, was a founder of the Knoxville Symphony Orchestra, and her uncle, Phil Stong, wrote the book State Fair, which was later made into three movies and a stage musical.

She studied animal science at Iowa State University, because they did not allow women in their Veterinary Sciences program at the time. There she trained in sculpture with artist Christian Petersen.

== Family ==
She married Gaylord "Joe" Lyon on July 22, 1950, in Ames, Iowa, and they moved to Toledo, Iowa, to run their dairy farm, Lyon Jerseys. The couple had nine children.

== Career ==
In 1960, she took over the Iowa State Fair butter cow creation, a tradition since 1911. She later expanded to creating other sculptures, including Garth Brooks, Elvis Presley, John Wayne, Peanuts characters, a Harley-Davidson motorcycle, American Gothic by Grant Wood and the Last Supper. She also made busts of Katie Couric, Matt Lauer, Barack Obama and a cheese bust of David Letterman.

Lyon appeared on To Tell the Truth in 1963, and was correctly identified as the Butter Cow Lady by two of the panelists, Kitty Carlisle and Tom Poston. She later appeared on Late Night with David Letterman with a cow carved from cheese. She was the subject of a 2002 book, The Butter Cow Lady, written by Brenda Mickle.

== Death ==
On June 26, 2011, she died of a stroke in Marshalltown, Iowa, age 81. She was survived by a large extended family, including her husband, nine children, 23 grandchildren, and five great-grandchildren.
