= Iowa State Fair =

Annual fair in Iowa

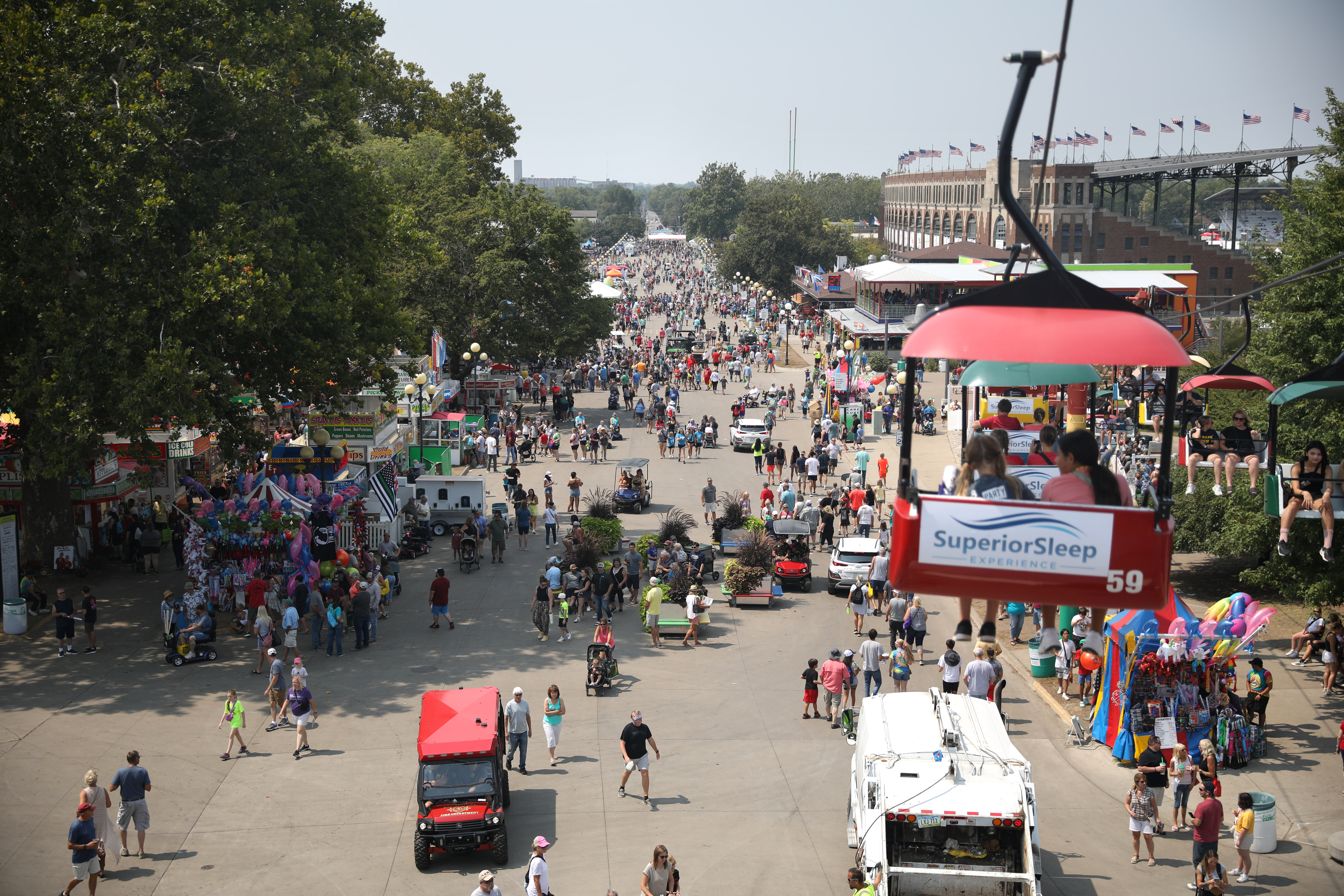
- "Nothing Compares"
- Genre: State fair
- Dates: 11 days
- Locations: Iowa State Fairgrounds; Des Moines, Iowa, United States
- Coordinates: 41°35′44″N 93°32′55″W
- Years active: 1854–present (excluding 1898, 1942–1945, 2020)
- Next event: August 12–22, 2027
- Attendance: 1,218,834 (2026) (Record)
- Area: 445 acres (180 ha)
- Website: Official Website

The Iowa State Fair is a state fair held in Des Moines, Iowa, every August. The first fair began in 1854 in Fairfield and has been held in the Iowa State Fairgrounds since 1886. It is based near the state capital over an 11-day period in August. With over a million visitors, it is the largest event in Iowa.

The fair is known to hold many competitions including the butter cow competition and multiple agricultural contests. It hosts multiple forms of entertainment for fairgoers including concerts hosted at the grandstands and a parade that takes place before the opening of the fair. It is also known to host many concerts, with the most sold showings being Sonny and Cher in 1972 which attracted 26,200 people, Johnny Cash in 1970 which attracted 23,500 people in two shows, and the Beach Boys in 1975, attracting 25,402 people.

== History ==
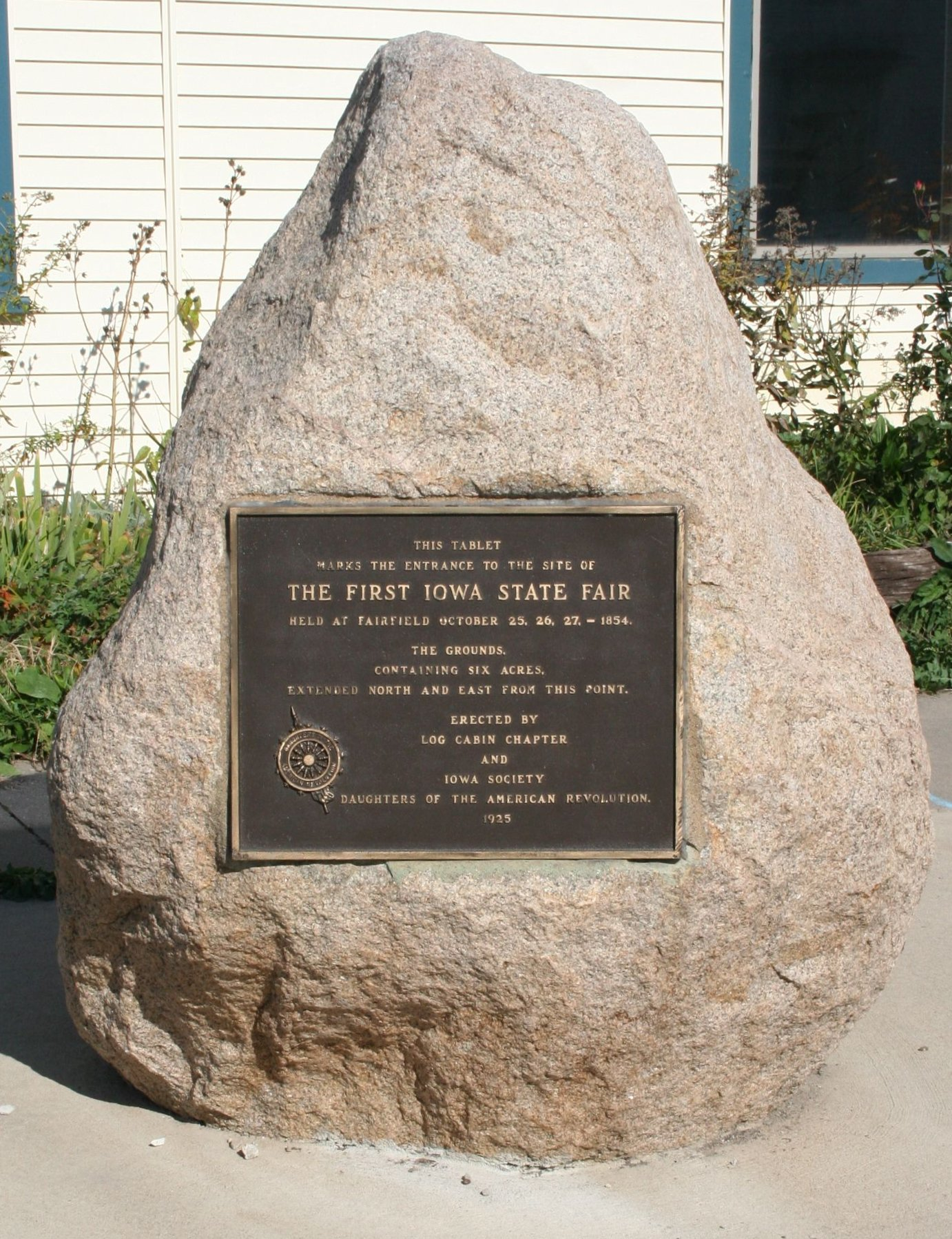
Site of First Iowa State Fair in Fairfield, Iowa.

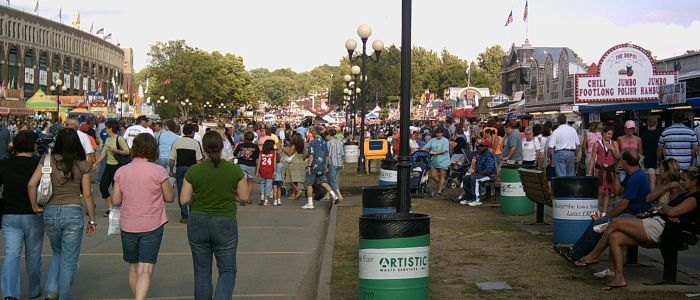
The Grand Concourse, located between the Grandstand and the Varied Industries Building, during the 2006 Iowa State Fair.

The first Iowa State Fair was staged in Fairfield on October 25–27, 1854, with a budget of $323. A crowd of 7,000 - 10,000 people showed up in the streets of Fairfield, with only 6 acres (2.4 ha) of fairground space. George C. Dixon delivered the first opening address for the fair saying how it was an historic event for the new state of Iowa. For the first few decades of the fair being open, poor transportation and facilities caused the fair to be mostly a local event. This caused the fair to be moved to other towns so more people could experience the fair. The Fair was held again in Fairfield in 1855, then for the next several years, moved from town to town, remaining mostly in eastern Iowa. The Fair was held in Muscatine in 1856–1857, Oskaloosa in 1858–1859, Iowa City in 1860–1861, Dubuque in 1862–1863, Burlington in 1864–1866, Clinton in 1867–1868, Keokuk in 1869–1870 and 1874–1875, and Cedar Rapids in 1871–1873 and 1876–1878.

During the time when the fair was held in Keokuk, residents in Iowa complained about the fair being too out of the way from the rest of Iowa, insisting the fair to be brought more west. The Fair moved permanently within the Des Moines city limits in 1879. The fair was in Brown's Park which consisted of 60 acres (24 ha), and over 100,000 people showed up. After the Iowa State Legislature and the City of Des Moines appropriated funds for the Fair in 1886, it moved to its current location at East 30th and East Grand in Des Moines. In 1911, Machinery Hall, opened. It covers roughly 5 acres (2.0 ha) worth of land and cost $75,000 to build. It showcased wares from Iowa companies that would be particularly interesting to farm families. During the 1917 fair, the Des Moines Register set up a wireless station at the fair and became the first newspaper in Iowa to receive a wireless message.

In 1959, Bill Riley created the Iowa State Fair Talent Search. Across Iowa they hosted talent shows, where local winners would go on to compete at the Fair. The stage was renamed to his name in 1996. In 1973, a group of Meskwaki singers and dancers protested for the ability to perform at the fair. The Iowa State Fair board granted the Meskwaki the opportunity to perform with a 4–3 vote.

The Fair was not held in 1898, due to the celebration of the World's Fair in nearby Omaha, Nebraska, as well as the Spanish–American War. It also was not held from 1942 to 1945 due to World War II, when the state allowed military personnel to use the grounds as a supply depot. In 2020 it was "postponed" due to the COVID-19 pandemic, however on August 13–23, 2020 a virtual fair was held in its place.

The Fair was the setting for the 1933 film State Fair, its 1945 musical adaptation, and the 1962 film State Fair.

The 2026 Fair was a record year for the fair when 1,218,834 people showed up. The 2026 Fair is followed by 2024 with 1,182,682 Fairgoers.

== Fairgrounds ==
$50,000 was saved up to buy a permanent site for the fairgrounds, and in 1884, farmland owned by Charles Thornton was bought and used for the fairgrounds. In the summer of 1885, the fairgrounds were finished being built, wither over 50 buildings on the ground. In 1987, the fairgrounds were listed as a historic district on the National Register of Historic Places. They are also known as the Iowa State Fair and Exposition Grounds. They are spread over 450 acres (1.8 km^{2}), including 160 acres (0.65 km^{2}) of campsites. Located at East 30th Street and East University Avenue, it is a 10-minute drive east from downtown Des Moines. The fairgrounds are filled with around 50 different carnival rides and multiple vendors during the Fair.

== Contests and competitions ==
=== Agricultural contests ===
Agricultural contests are held for the largest boar, ram, bull, and rabbit. There are 4-H, Future Farmers of America (FFA), and open-class shows for sheep, swine, beef and dairy cattle, horses, goats, llamas, rabbits, poultry and dogs. Contests include rooster crowing, hog calling, wood chopping, pie eating, monster arm wrestling and cow chip throwing.

=== The Butter Cow ===
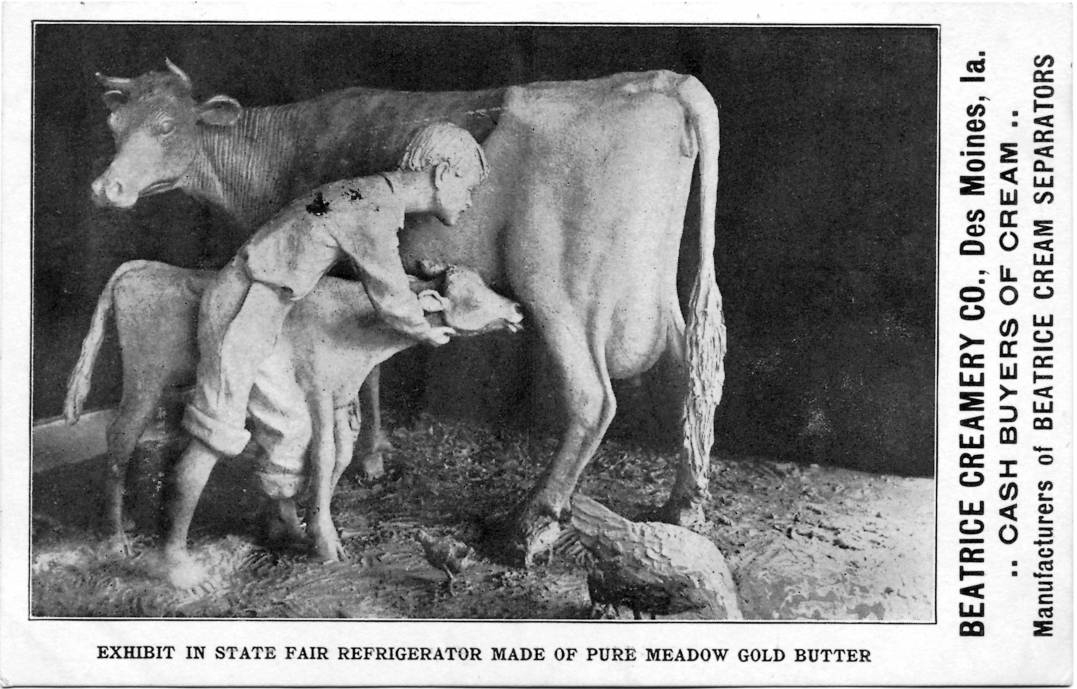
John K. Daniels' butter cow at the 1911 Iowa State Fair.

The Butter Cow, an Iowa State Fair staple since 1911 when J.K. Daniels sculpted the first one, is located in the Agricultural Building. After sculpting her first butter cow in 1960, Norma "Duffy" Lyon sculpted all six breeds of dairy cows over the next 45 years, as well as Garth Brooks, a butter version of Grant Wood's American Gothic, the Peanuts characters, Iowa native John Wayne and Elvis Presley, a Harley-Davidson motorcycle, various animals, and a butter rendition of Leonardo da Vinci's The Last Supper. Lyon was succeeded in 2006 by her longtime apprentice, Sarah Pratt. Pratt's 2023 butter sculpture featured iconic Iowa athletes Jack Trice, Kurt Warner, and Caitlin Clark.

=== Food competitions ===
Food competitions are also seen at the Fair. They are all gathered in the Elwell Family Food Center where cooks and bakers gather to create their creations. There is an annual Ugly Cakes contest where people make cakes shaped like spilled trash cans, human hearts, and couches topped with fingernail clippings.

== Food ==
The Iowa State Fair has a variety of food, including gluten-free offerings, from more than 200 food stands. The fair is known for its food on a stick, which numbered over 70 offerings in 2015. Some of the most distinctive are deep fried, including Snickers, Oreos, cheesecake, pickle dawg (pastrami or ham with cream cheese and pickle), and butter. The 2023 People's Choice Best New Food was Deep-Fried Bacon Brisket Mac-n-Cheese Grilled Cheese from What's Your Cheez. Other meat-on-a stick products include pork chop, bacon-wrapped hot dog dipped in a cornmeal batter, and the footlong corndog. 2025 saw boba drinks make their debut at the fair.

== Entertainment ==
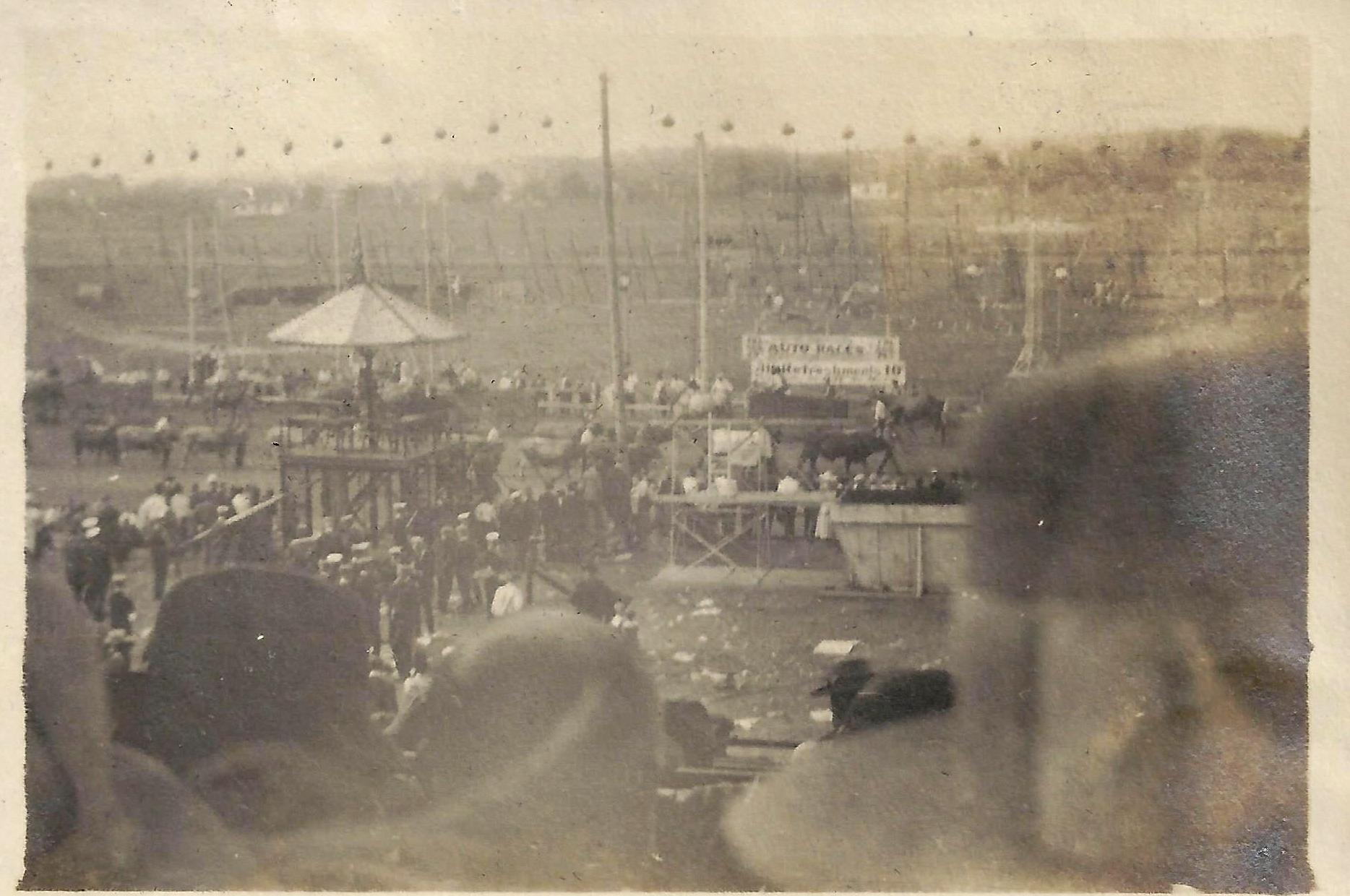
Horses on a race track on August 29, 1917, at the grandstands.

=== Grandstand ===
The Iowa State Fair Grandstand was built in 1909. It was made out of wood and seated 10,000. It was renovated in 1927 which was constructed out of steel and brick. It add 5,000 more seats and 600 feet (180 m). In 1997 and 2018 it was also renovated. At the time, it was the largest building in Iowa. It is located on Grand Ave, just off of the main gate. The largest Grandstand audience, for a single performance, was The Beach Boys in 1975 with 25,402 concertgoers. In 2025, the Grandstand recorded 131,755 concertgoers, surpassing the previous record set in 2019 with 128,504 concertgoers.

=== The Bill Riley Talent Search ===
Bill Riley's Iowa State Fair Talent Search debuted in 1959 and features Iowans ages 2 to 21. In 1996, Riley retired after 50 Fairs and 37 Fair Talent Shows and the Plaza Stage was renamed the Anne and Bill Riley Stage. He died in December 2006, succeeded by Bill Riley Jr., who has been host since 1997. Nearly 100 local qualifying shows are held across the state. There are seven days of preliminary competition for Sprouts (ages 2–12) and Seniors (ages 13–21), followed by the semi-finals and, ultimately, the selection of a Sprout and Senior champion.

=== Iowa State Fair Parade ===
The Iowa State Fair Parade is considered Iowa's largest parade, having around 200 floats, vehicles, and other performers. It occurs the evening before the opening of the State Fair. The parade begins at the State Capitol Complex and travels west on Grand to 15th Street.

=== Former entertainment ===
The Iowa State Fair has been home to many forms of entertainment over the years. Notably, in 1932 the Fair hired Joseph Connolly to crash two outdated locomotives together in front of the Grandstand. Connolly named one "Hoover" and one "Roosevelt" in honor of the presidential candidates of the day, presaging the State Fair's role in Presidential nominations. The trains accelerated to approximately 50 miles per hour and smashed in a fiery spectacle before 45,000 fairgoers. Other past entertainment includes a plane intentionally crashing into a model of a house, a circus elephant, and a human cannonball.

== Political soapbox ==
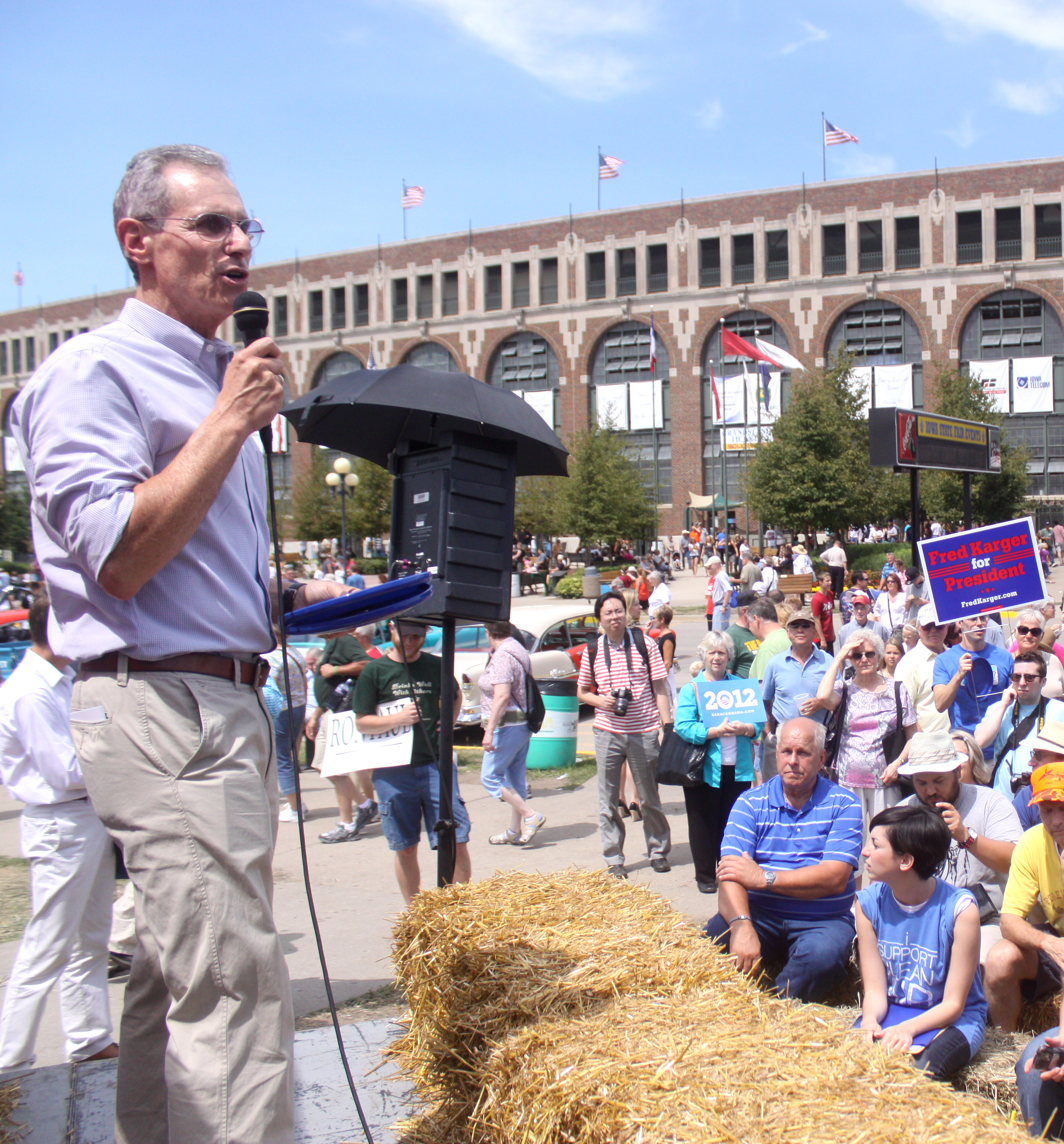
Fred Karger campaigning on April 28, 2012.

Many political candidates and presidents have gone to the Iowa state fair to campaign, with Dwight D. Eisenhower and Herbert Hoover being the first presidents to visit the Fair in 1954. Since 1954, 7 presidents have visited the fair. Gerald Ford in 1975, Jimmy Carter in 1976, George W. Bush in 2002, Barack Obama in 2007, Donald Trump in 2012, 2015, 2023, and 2025, and Joe Biden in 2019. Multiple other presidential candidates have visited the Fair, and the Des Moines Register currently sponsors the "Political Soapbox,” which provides space for candidates to speak to the public. Candidates have 20 minutes to speak and can take questions from the crowd as well. Historically the Iowa caucuses have been the first contest in the presidential nomination process, and the fair preceding the caucuses is a high visibility event for candidates.

== Police department ==
The Iowa State Fair Police Department was established in 2018, replacing the combination of private security guards and local law enforcement agencies that previously provided security and policing services to the Fairgrounds. Officers wear a blue uniform with a distinctive white cowboy hat. The police officers are state-certified officers but funded by the Iowa State Fair Authority. Officers work year-round, providing services to the State Fair and other events held at the Fairgrounds. There are six full-time police officers and a number of part-time officers, made up of both retired and active-duty officers. People arrested at the Fair are booked on site and transported to Polk County Jail by Des Moines Police Department and the Iowa State Patrol.
