= Culture of Texas =

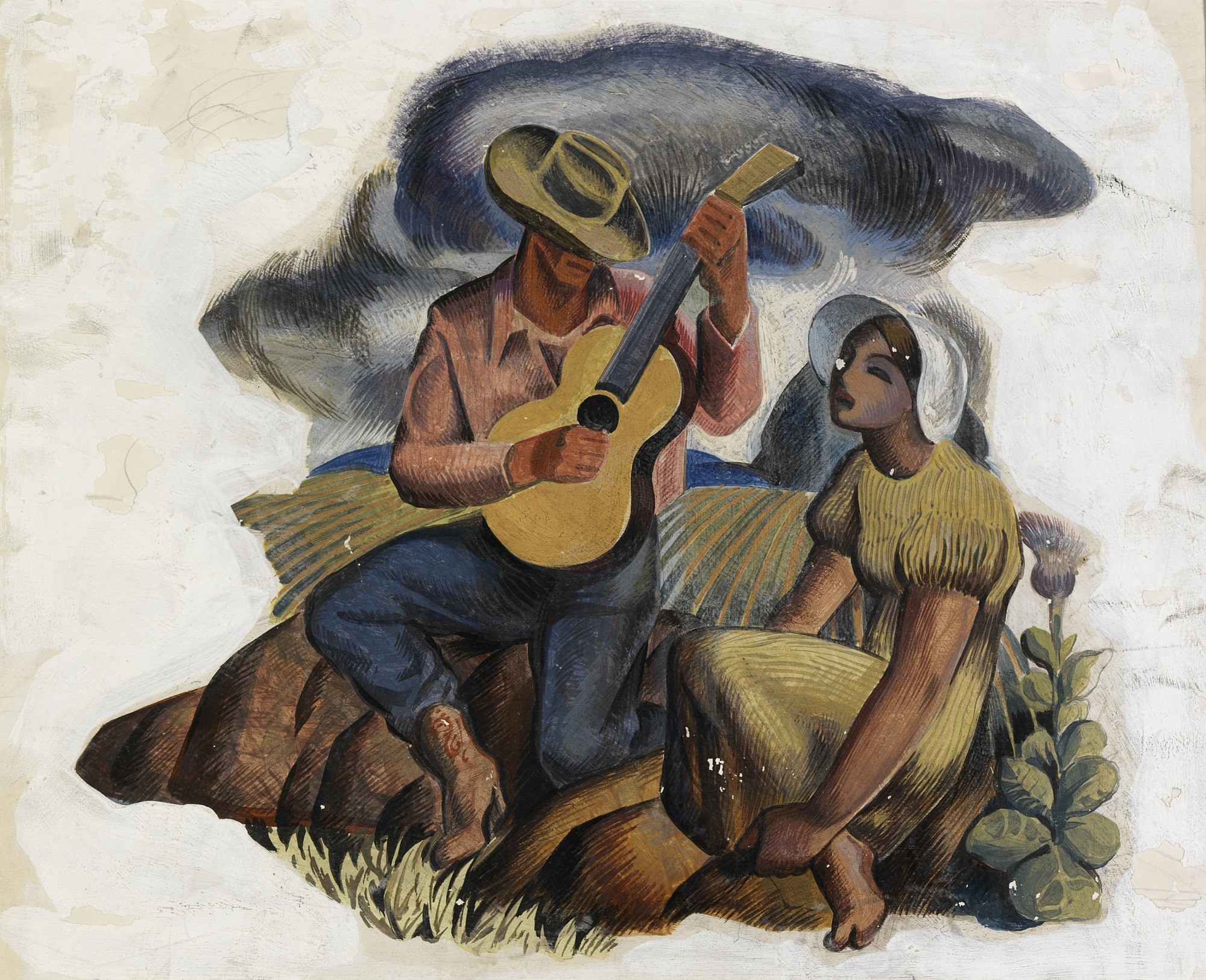
“Music of the Plains” (mural study, Kilgore, Texas, 1939) by Xavier Gonzalez.

The culture of Texas has been influenced by migration from the American North and West, differing from that of its eastern neighbors in the Deep South. It encompasses many different subcultures as well as regional and cultural influences from the German Texans, Tejanos, Cajuns, Irish, African American, Indigenous and White Anglo-Southern communities established before the republic era and statehood.

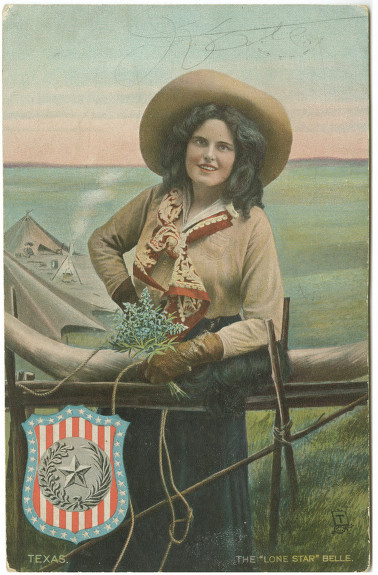
The "Lone Star" Belle, postcard, around 1908.

Texas is divided into five major regions: East Texas, Central Texas, North Texas, South Texas, and West Texas. These regions are defined by urban centers and varying cultural characteristics. The Texas Triangle, formed by Houston, Dallas-Fort Worth, and San Antonio, is an interstate corridor between the three major Texan cities closest to the geographic center.

Texas' location between the western prairies, the Deep South, and Mexico has contributed to the blend of Hispanic, African, and Anglo traditions. Texas also includes communities with origins in Germany, Czechoslovakia, Poland, Mexico, Southern Africa, White Southern, and Native American populations. The United States Census Bureau places Texas in the Southern United States.

== Agriculture ==
Texas has the most farms and farm acreage in the United States. The state is ranked first in revenue generated from total livestock and livestock products. It is ranked second in total agricultural revenue, behind California. At $7.4 billion, or 56.7 percent of Texas's annual agricultural cash receipts, beef cattle production represents the largest single segment of Texan agriculture. This is followed by cotton at $1.9 billion (14.6 percent), greenhouse/nursery at $1.5 billion (11.4 percent), broiler chickens at $1.3 billion (10 percent), and dairy products at $947 million (7.3 percent).

Texas produces the most cattle, horses, sheep, goats, wool, mohair, and hay in the United States. The state also grows significant amounts of cereal crops and produce.

=== Ranch and cowboy culture ===
Texas's ranching tradition has significantly shaped American cowboy culture, especially in rodeo. The state is often associated with an image of a cowboy, shown in westerns, and connected to country music, for which Texas is known nationally and internationally. The state's natural resource production and numerous oil tycoons are a popular topic in pop culture, and appear in media such as the TV series Dallas.

=== Rodeo ===
The Texas Legislature declared rodeo the official state sport in 1997. The annual Houston Livestock Show and Rodeo is the world's largest known rodeo by attendance, drawing over 2.7 million visitors over roughly 20 days from late February through early March. The event begins with trail rides that originate from several points throughout the state, all of which convene at NRG Park for a barbecue cook-off. The rodeo includes typical rodeo events as well as concert performances from major artists and carnival rides. The Fort Worth Livestock Show and Rodeo lasts three weeks in late January and early February. It has many traditional rodeos as well as a cowboy rodeo and a Mexican rodeo that both have large fan bases.

=== State Fair ===
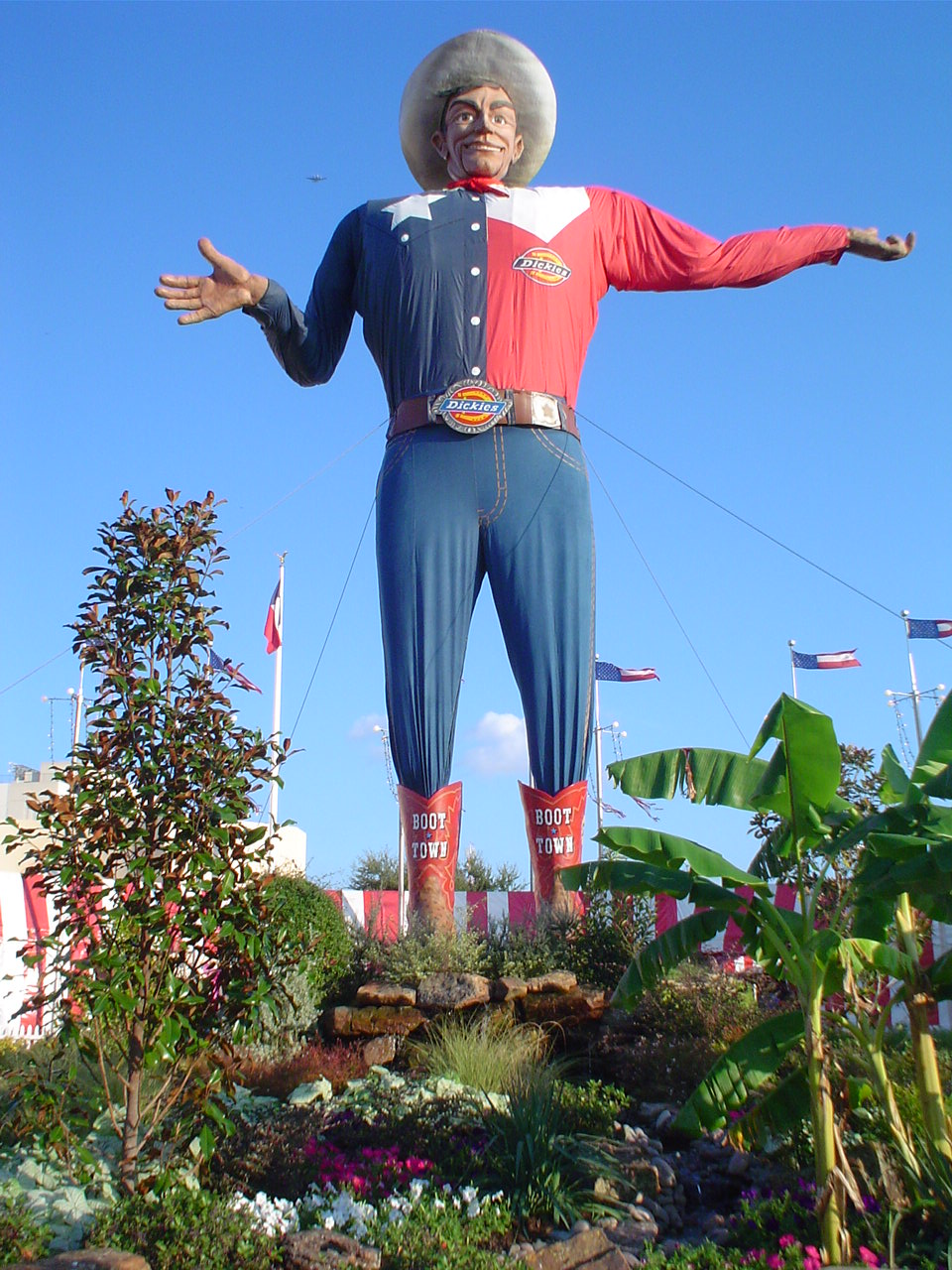
Big Tex, the mascot of the State Fair of Texas since 1952

The State Fair of Texas is one of the largest state fairs in the United States by attendance. It is held in Dallas each year between late September and mid-to late October at Fair Park. Two major college football games, the Red River Rivalry between the University of Oklahoma Sooners and the University of Texas Longhorns, and the State Fair Classic between the Grambling State University Tigers and the Prairie View A&M University Panthers, are played at the Cotton Bowl in Fair Park during the fair. In 2025, the State Fair hosted the inaugural ‘State Fair Clásico’, a women’s soccer match between Dallas Trinity FC and Club América Femenil. The friendly attracted 22,938 spectators on October 18, 2025, setting a record for attendance at a Dallas Trinity FC home match. The event is known for its fried food, especially corn dogs. The State Fair is also home to the Texas Star, the tallest Ferris wheel in the Western Hemisphere, and Big Tex, a 55-foot-tall (17 m) cowboy statue.

Other state fairs held in Texas include the North Texas State Fair in Denton, the South Texas State Fair in Beaumont, and the East Texas State Fair in Tyler.

== History ==
Texas was originally home to many tribes, like the Caddo, Apache, Comanche, Karankawa, and Tonkawa. The word “Texas” comes from the Caddo word “Taysha,” meaning friends or allies. Spain controlled Texas for about 300 years, contributing to the growth of missions, ranching traditions, and general Catholic influence.

The history of Texas, particularly of the old independent Republic of Texas, is intimately bound up with its present culture. Frontier Texas! is a museum of the American Old West in Abilene. Texas is also home to many historical societies, such as the Texas Historical Commission and Texas State Historical Association

=== Folklore of Texas ===
Texas has a considerable independent body of folklore, primarily in connection with historical ranching and cowboy cultures, the American Old West, and the Texas War of Independence. The Texas Folklore Society is the second-oldest folklore organization continually functioning in the United States. Many figures and stories in American folklore are associated with Texas, some of them being:

- Pecos Bill, the fictional American cowboy
- Davy Crockett, 19th-century American folk hero, frontiersman, soldier, and politician who served in the Texas Revolution and died at the Battle of the Alamo.
- Ottine Swamp Thing, the urban legend of a Bigfoot-like swamp monster in Ottine, Texas.

== State holidays ==
Texas has several recognized state holidays, including:

- Texas Independence Day
- Lyndon Baines Johnson Day
- San Jacinto Day (Celebration of defeating Mexico for Independence)
- Juneteenth
- Confederate Heroes Day (partial staffing day)
- Sam Houston Monument

== Art ==
=== Monuments & Statues ===
- Dealey Plaza National Historic Landmark District
- John Fitzgerald Kennedy Memorial Plaza
- San Jacinto Battleground State Historic Site
- Eiffel Tower (Paris, Texas)
- Mustangs of Las Colinas

=== Music ===
Texas' musical culture encompasses a wide variety of ethnic genres and regional styles.

Texas has a significant live music scene in Austin, with more music venues per capita than any other U.S. city, consistent with the city's official slogan as "The Live Music Capital of the World." Austin's music revolves around the many nightclubs on 6th Street and an annual film, music, and multimedia festival known as South by Southwest. Austin City Limits, the longest-running concert music program on American television, has been taped at the University of Texas at Austin campus since 1974. Austin City Limits and Waterloo Records run the Austin City Limits Music Festival, an annual music and art festival held at Zilker Park in Austin.

In Houston, the annual Free Press Summer Fest is a major draw as well as the entertainment lineups at the annual Houston Livestock Show and Rodeo. Notable music venues for Houston are Fitzgerald's, Warehouse Live, and Walter's among others. Many renowned musicians' origins are in Houston including Lyle Lovett, Beyoncé, Clint Black, The Crusaders, Lightnin' Hopkins, and Kenny Rogers as well as groups including D.R.I., Helstar, La Mafia, the Geto Boys, and ZZ Top. The Houston Symphony and Houston Grand Opera are both attractions of the Houston Theater District.

San Antonio, Dallas, Lubbock, and El Paso have also contributed distinct musical traditions to Texas's cultural landscape. San Antonio, with its deep Mexican-American roots, is known for nurturing Tejano and conjunto music, blending traditional Mexican folk with modern influences. In the Panhandle and West Texas, artists like Buddy Holly and Roy Orbison helped pioneer early rock and roll, with Lubbock and El Paso continuing to serve as hubs for emerging talent. Dallas, meanwhile, has a thriving blues and jazz scene, historically rooted in Deep Ellum, a neighborhood once frequented by Blind Lemon Jefferson and T-Bone Walker.

=== Literature ===
Texas' literature is about the history and culture of Texas, some literary genres dating from the time of the first European contact. Representative authors include Mary Austin Holley and Katherine Anne Porter.

=== Japanese anime ===
Texas' two major cities, Dallas and Houston, currently house two major Japanese anime licensing and production companies: Crunchyroll and Sentai Filmworks, which dubs anime films in the English language.

== Sports ==
Rodeo is the official sport of Texas.

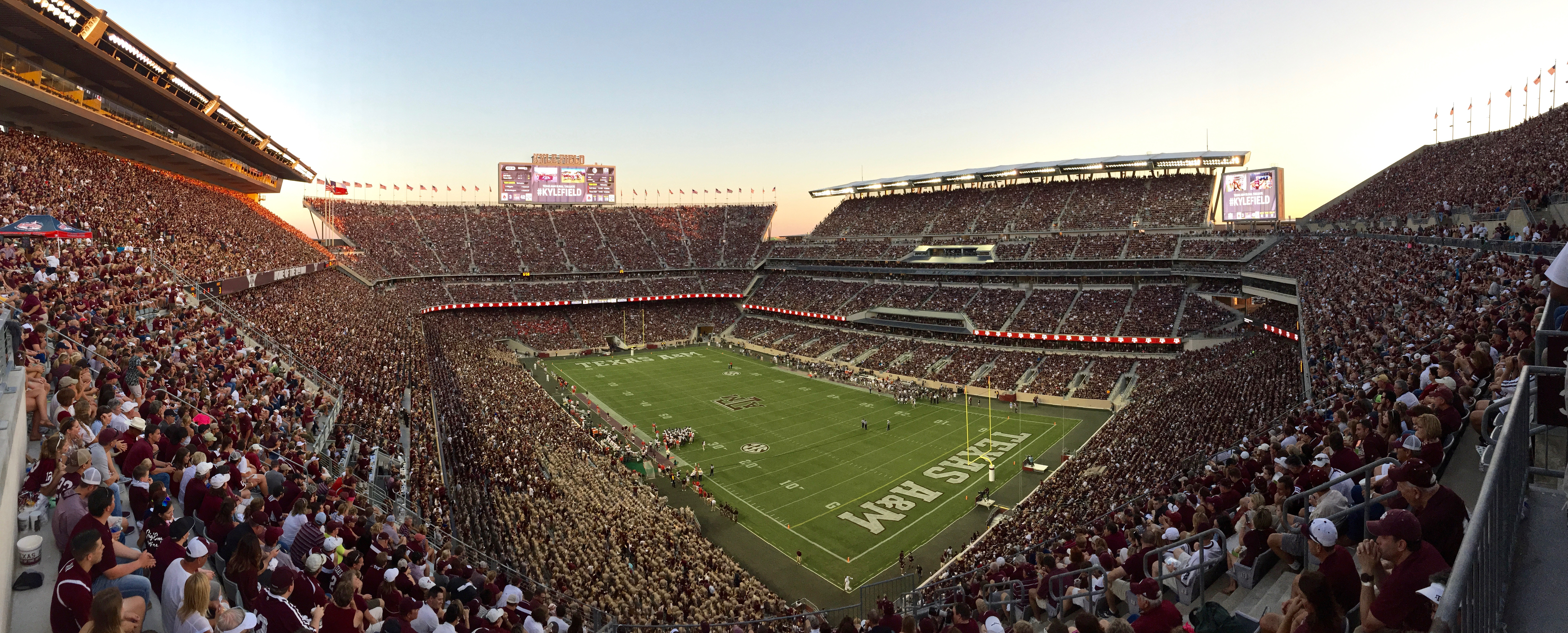
Kyle Field, a football stadium located on the campus of Texas A&M University, which is the largest stadium in Texas.

Texas has 12 NCAA Division I football teams, more than any other state. There are two NFL teams, Dallas Cowboys and Houston Texans.

The Texas Rangers and Houston Astros are Texas's teams in Major League Baseball. Texas has three minor league baseball teams in the Triple-A Pacific Coast League and five in the Double-A Texas League.

Texas has three NBA (National Basketball Association) teams: the Houston Rockets, San Antonio Spurs, and Dallas Mavericks.

The Texas Motor Speedway in Fort Worth is a large motorsport track, hosting both domestic and international events.

Lacrosse, which originated from indigenous tribes, is also played in Texas.

Soccer is a popular participatory sport—especially among children—but as a spectator sport, it does not yet have a large following despite three Texas teams in Major League Soccer (FC Dallas, Austin FC, and Houston Dynamo FC).

Ice hockey has been a growing participatory sport in the Dallas/Fort Worth area since the Minnesota North Stars became the Dallas Stars in 1993. Minor league professional hockey has since grown. Texas is home to the San Antonio Rampage and Texas Stars of the American Hockey League and the Allen Americans of the ECHL. Texas was also home to many Central Hockey League and Western Professional Hockey League teams prior to the leagues' dissolution. Some of the organizations involved with the former leagues launched junior ice hockey teams in the North American Hockey League and the league headquarters were moved to Frisco.

== Media ==
Media devoted to Texas culture include Texas Monthly, a monthly magazine headquartered in Austin.

== Cuisine ==
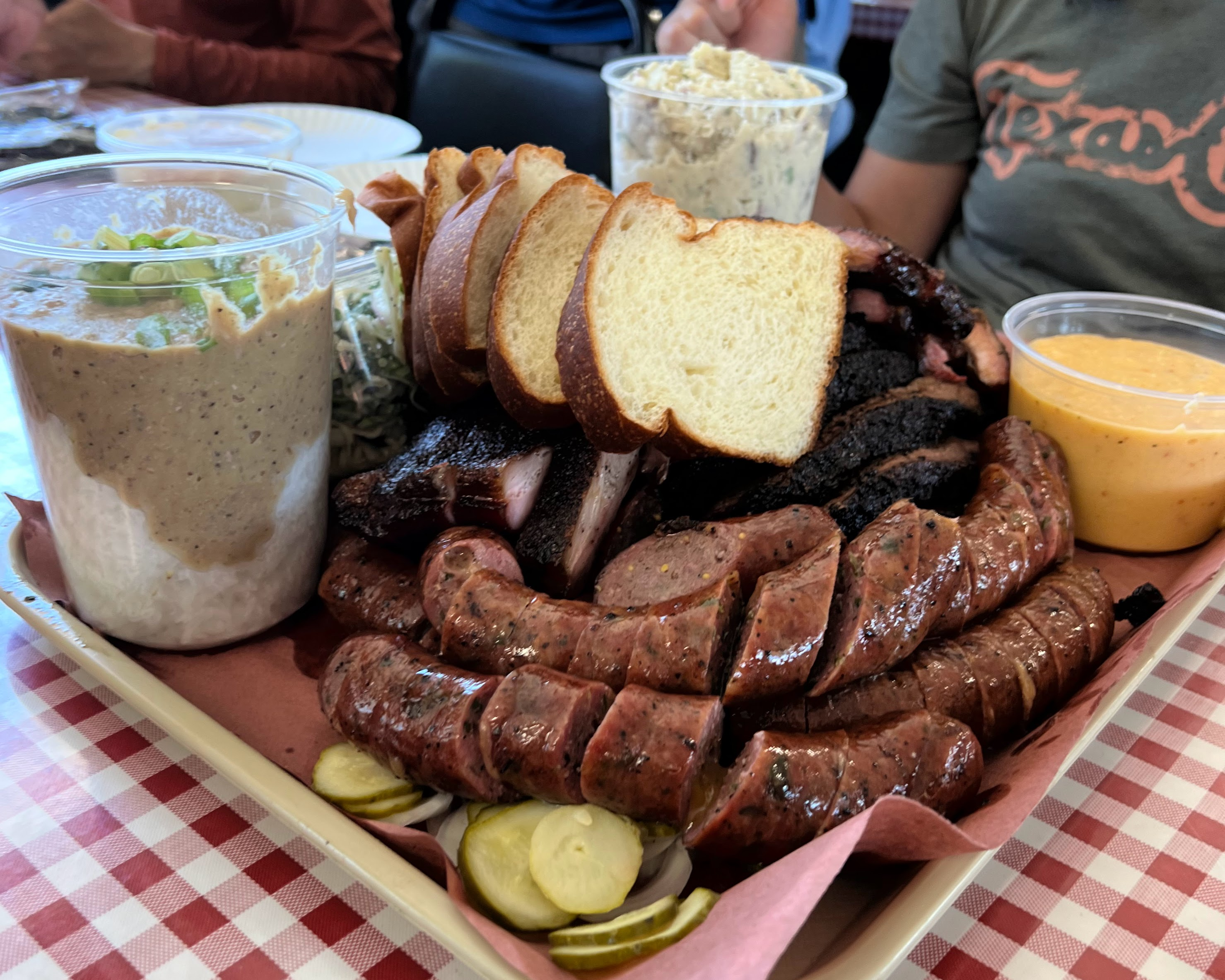
A plate of Texan barbecue including beef brisket, sausage, potato salad, toast and dill pickles, served at Goldee's Barbecue.

Aspects of Texas cuisine include:

- Texas barbecue and the local fusion of Southern, Mexican, American, and Southwestern cuisines called Tex-Mex cuisine.
- Tex-Mex cuisine, which blends Mexican and American cooking styles, featuring dishes such as fajitas, enchiladas, nachos, and chili con carne.

== Political ==
Texas’ political culture is generally described as a blend of traditionalist and individualistic orientations. Traditionalist values emphasize maintaining established social hierarchies and influence policies on issues such as same-sex marriage and abortion, while also contributing to historically low voter turnout. Individualistic values prioritize self-reliance and the interests of family or close networks, shaping preferences for lower taxes and the absence of a state income tax.

== Other ==
The Texas Folklife Festival is an annual event sponsored by the University of Texas at San Antonio's Institute of Texan Cultures celebrating the ethnicities represented in the population of the state of Texas. Thousands attend the three-day event each year, which features food, crafts, music, and dances from ethnic groups that immigrated to Texas.

A 2015 report by non-profit organization Mission: Readiness found that 73% of military-aged youth in Texas were physically ineligible for military service due to issues with obesity and ill-health, a rate significantly higher than the national average.

== See also ==
- Institute of Texan Cultures
- List of people from Texas
- List of Texas state symbols
- Languages of Texas, including Texas German
- Texas Institute of Letters
