= Mondell =

Mondell is a surname. Notable people with the surname include:

- Frank Wheeler Mondell (1860–1939), United States Representative from Wyoming
- Anthony Mondell (1916–2009), Academy Award-nominated art director
- Allen Mondell and Cynthia Salzman Mondell, directors of the 2009 film A Reason to Live
