= A Fair to Remember =

A Fair to Remember may refer to:

- A Fair to Remember (film)
- A Fair to Remember (Modern Family)

== See also ==
- A Faire to Remember, a 2001 album by Brobdingnagian Bards
- An Affair to Remember, a 1957 American romance film
- "A Fair to Remember", a Season 2 episode of Chowder
