= Norman Washington Harllee =

African American educator (c. 1847–1927)

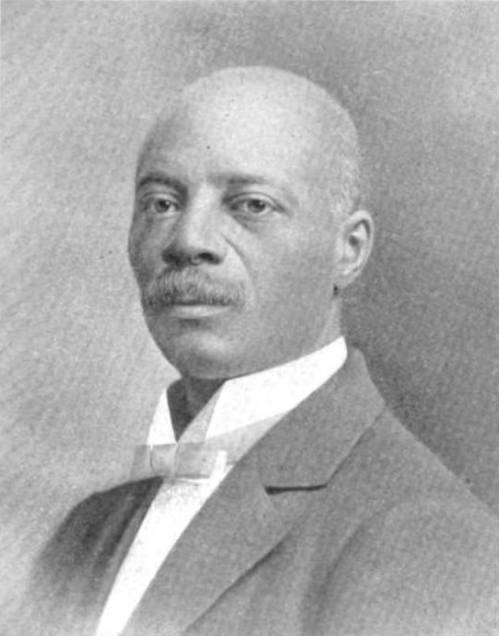
- Born: July 15, 1852; Robeson County, North Carolina, US
- Died: May 17, 1927 (aged 74); Dallas, Texas, US
- Education: Biddle University, A.B. University of Chicago, A.M.
- Occupation: Educator

Norman Washington Harllee (July 15, 1852 – May 17, 1927) was an African American educator. He was associated with the public schools in Dallas, Texas for more than 40 years.

== Early life and education ==
Harllee was born between 1847 and 1853 on the Harllee Plantation near Lumberton in Robeson County, North Carolina where he was enslaved. (Note: Daniel Wallace Culp states Harllee's birthdate was July 15, 1852.) His parents were Luisa and Evan Harllee, both enslaved. He taught himself to read and write using Webster's Blue Back Speller. He was also self-taught in shorthand. He taught school in Richmond County, North Carolina in 1867. He attended Biddle University, graduating with honors in 1879 with an A.B. Later, he earned an A.M. degree from the University of Chicago.

== Career ==
Harllee taught school in Richmond County, North Carolina after graduating from college. He was elected the register of deeds for Richmond County, North Carolina in 1881. He was a speaker at the Colored Fair in Raleigh, North Carolina in 1881. He was appointed to the position of postal clerk from 1882 to 1885, first serving on the Carolina Central Railroad in 1882, later transferring to Charlotte, Columbia, and August Railroad.

In 1882, he became the vice president of the North Carolina Teachers’ Education Association. That summer, he oversaw a Black teacher's institute in Laurinburg, North Carolina. He was in charge of the Colored Public School in Laurinburg, starting in 1883. He served on the executive committee of the North Carolina Industrial Association, advocating for the provision of industrial education to Black students.

He moved to Dallas, Texas in 1885. He was the principal of Grammar School No. 2 in Dallas, also teaching there at Ninth Street Colored Street. He was principal of Dallas Colored High School from 1901 to 1912.

During the summers, Harllee organized and taught normal institutes for teachers; he served in this role for nearly thirty years starting in 1895, training Black teachers in pedagogy. He helped organize and was president of the Texas Colored Teacher's State Association from 1897 to 1898. In this capacity, he advocated for a Colored Branch University in Austin, authorized by the Constitution of Texas in 1876 but not yet established. The Black educators efforts led to state funding of Prairie View State Normal and Industrial College in 1915. In 1913, Harllee was the founding president of the Colored Normal and Industrial Institute in Dallas; however, the institute closed after three years for financial reasons. In a letter the Dallas Express in 1920, G. W. Jackson wrote, "Prof. N. W. Harllee has been a bold, courageous, and aggressive leader whose diplomatic movements for his people have won friends for them where opposite races where not kindly disposed."

Harllee wrote the "Colored Society" column for The Dallas Morning News about Black community affairs from the 1890s to the 1900s. In 1913, Harllee established the Union City News in the all-Black town, Union City, Texas. From 1919 to 1923, he was a reporter and columnist for the Black-owned Dallas Express, covering churches, fraternal organizations, and education. He wrote the column "N. W. Harllee's Two-Minute Talk for Boys and Girls".

Harllee wrote several textbooks, including Harllee's Tree of History, Simplified Long Division, and c.

== Personal life ==
On January 7, 1891, Harllee married Florence Belle Coleman of Dallas. They had three children: Chauncey Depew Harllee, Lucretia Harllee, and Norman W. Harllee Jr.

While in North Carolina, Harllee was chairman of the Richmond County Republican Party in the early 1880s; he was nominated chair of the State Republican Convention but stepped aside to a white man to reduce racial conflicts within the party. He coordinated a fundraising campaign for Biddle University. in 1884.

After moving to Texas, Harllee was a founder and president of the Dallas Colored Literary Society. In 1887, he was the founder of the Colored Library Association in Dallas. In the 1880s, he was the first superintendent of the Colored Department of the Texas State Fair, serving in that position for at least fourteen years. He was chairman of the board of the YMCA of Dallas where he conducted a night school for all ages and genders, along with several other teachers. He belonged to the Bethel African Methodist Episcopal Church.

Harllee died on May 17, 1927, from bronchial pneumonia. He was buried in Dallas in the Woodland Cemetery.

== Honors ==
Daniel Wallace Culp included Harllee and his photograph in the 1902 book Twentieth Century Negro Literature or, a Cyclopedia of Thought on the Vital Topics Relating to the American Negro.

The Ninth Ward School in Dallas was renamed N. W. Harllee Elementary School in his honor in January 1927. After the elementary school closed in 2012, it was repurposed as the N. W. Harllee Early Childhood Center in 2013.

He was inducted into the African American Educators Hall of Fame and received the Pioneer/Trailblazer Award from the Dallas African American Archives and History Program in 2007.
