= A Reason to Live (2009 film) =

- Movie Poster
- Directed by: Allen Mondell, Cynthia Salzman Mondell
- Written by: Allen Mondell, Cynthia Salzman Mondell
- Produced by: Allen Mondell, Cynthia Salzman Mondell
- Edited by: Brian Hockenbury
- Distributed by: Media Projects, Inc.
- Release date: 2009
- Running time: College/adult version, 52:00; classroom version, 33:00
- Country: United States
- Language: English

A Reason to Live is a 2009 documentary film about teen and young adult depression and suicide. It captures twelve personal stories of despair and hope, told by young people of different ages, ethnicities and sexual orientations, and their families. It was produced and directed by Allen Mondell and Cynthia Salzman Mondell of Media Projects, Inc.

== Origins/production ==
Filmmakers Allen Mondell and Cynthia Salzman Mondell were asked to make this film by a close family friend whose son died by suicide. They wanted it to serve as a tool to educate others about the seriousness of depression and recognize the warning signs leading up to suicide.

CONTACT Crisis Line professionals in Dallas provided ongoing feedback about these issues and how to portray them sensitively on film. Members of their staff participated in the re-enactment of two crisis line calls that involved a team of mental health professionals, actors and film crew working to assure accurate and ethical treatment of these sensitive subjects and the individuals interviewed. The calls are intended to give viewers the verbal skills necessary to communicate to someone who is depressed and thinking about suicide.

In post-production, focus groups from North Texas area mental health organizations, the medical school, and university counseling centers provided input to assure that presentation of the issues in A Reason to Live upheld professional standards of mental health practice in this specific population.

== Distribution ==
Two DVD versions of the film were released by Media Projects, Inc. in 2009, including a 52-minute college/adult version, as well as a 33-minute classroom version that includes a panel discussion with community experts, filmmakers’ comments and a discussion and resource guide to be used by counselors/educators.

A Reason to Liveis being used as an educational tool by many high school and college counselors, as well as the National Alliance on Mental Illness.

The target audience includes young adults ages 15–24, families, youth agencies and civic organizations, public and private schools, community colleges, public and private colleges and universities, public libraries, coaches and mentors, mental health professionals, social workers and public health professionals, GLBT organizations and community centers, medical and rehabilitation professionals, hospitals and medical offices, child protective services and foster care systems, spiritual and religious institutions, law enforcement professionals and correctional facilities, elected officials and government agencies.

== Reception ==
A Reason to Live has received positive reviews from various health professionals, counseling facilities and education organizations.

American Library Association’s Booklist magazine calls the film a “useful resource for teens, parents, and educators.” Linda Holloway, chair of the Department of Rehabilitation, Social Work & Addictions at University of North Texas echoed that sentiment and commented “...(the film) is long overdue. It is a great resource for colleges and universities to open the dialogue with students.”

Missy Wall, director, Teen CONTACT Program, CONTACT Crisis Line Dallas, Texas commented, “Suicide is a silent killer of young adults, and A Reason to Live gives a voice and hope to the deadly silence. As an educator, this film has become an invaluable tool that has only begun to change and touch the lives of many young adults. At a recent training with the film, a teenage girl said, ‘I identified with so many things in the film and, now, I know that I am not alone.’ Hope saves lives, and A Reason to Live our new hope!”

Betsy Kennard, a researcher and associate professor of psychiatry at University of Texas Southwestern Medical Center at Dallas has said “This poignant documentary adds a personal perspective to a major public health problem, highlighting that while there is a need for suicide prevention and intervention, current treatments for depression are promising & offer hope."

Youth Today wrote "This sensitive, carefully constructed film leaves an unforgettable impression. From bleak moments to rays of hope, it tells the truth."

=== Other reviews ===
Other reviewers of the film include Educational Media Reviews Online and School Library Journal.

== Other films by Allen Mondell and Cynthia Salzman Mondell ==
- Sisters of '77
- A Fair to Remember
