= Half Moon Bay Art and Pumpkin Festival =

Annual festival in Half Moon Bay, California

Coordinates: 37°27′36″N 122°25′47″W

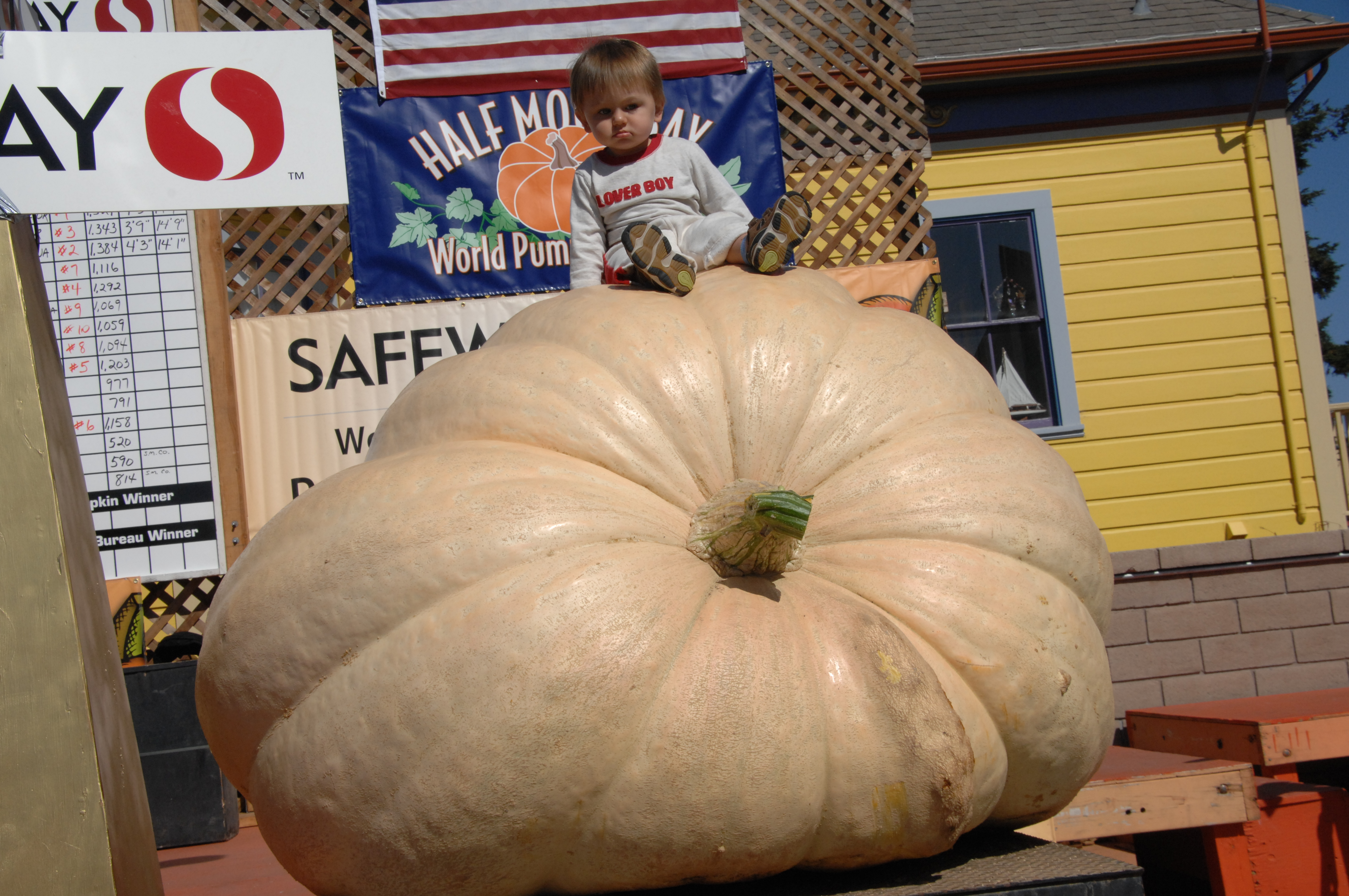
- Award-winning pumpkin with small child for reference
- Status: Active
- Genre: Festival
- Frequency: Annually
- Location: Half Moon Bay, California
- Country: United States
- Inaugurated: 1971

The Half Moon Bay Art and Pumpkin Festival is an annual festival held in the coastside community of Half Moon Bay, California, for one weekend during pumpkin harvest season. It is one of the oldest and largest local festivals in California. Proceeds go to local civic causes and to the beautification of the downtown area of Half Moon Bay. There is no admission charge for the event.

== Dates ==
The annual event is held in October. Columbus Day Monday is the Safeway World Champion Pumpkin Weigh-in contest. The Half Moon Bay Art and Pumpkin Festival is a two-day event held the following Saturday and Sunday, from 1971 to 2019, and since 2022.

The COVID-19 pandemic caused the festival to be canceled in 2020; the 50th was deferred to 2021. In 2021 the festival was again canceled, although there was a pumpkin weigh-off.

== Locations ==
The festival is located in downtown Half Moon Bay on Main Street between Miramontes and Spruce Streets. The Great Pumpkin Parade is held at noon on Saturday and runs east along Miramontes, North on Main St, and West on Mill Street. There are two music stages, one at the south entrance and one located next to the food court in the IDES grounds. A family stage is located at 620 Main Street. The associated Safeway World Championship Pumpkin Weigh-In is located on the IDES Grounds at 735 Main Street on Columbus Day, the Monday prior to the festival.

== History ==
The Half Moon Bay Art and Pumpkin Festival began in 1971 with the formation of the Main Street Beautification Committee. The group was formed to raise funds for the revitalization of Main Street, which was beginning to show signs of decay. With an abundance of pumpkin patches in the area, the committee organized an old-fashioned harvest-style pumpkin festival. The first festival attracted 30,000 people. That year only one non-profit organization offered food for sale. The festival now includes dozens of local non-profit groups operating food and game booths, selling everything from pumpkin pie to linguisa sandwiches. Proceeds go to various civic and local causes and have included the construction of two parks, multiple scholarship funds, the installation of old-fashioned downtown street lights, the underground wiring of Main Street, and the renovation of City Hall.

== Traditions ==
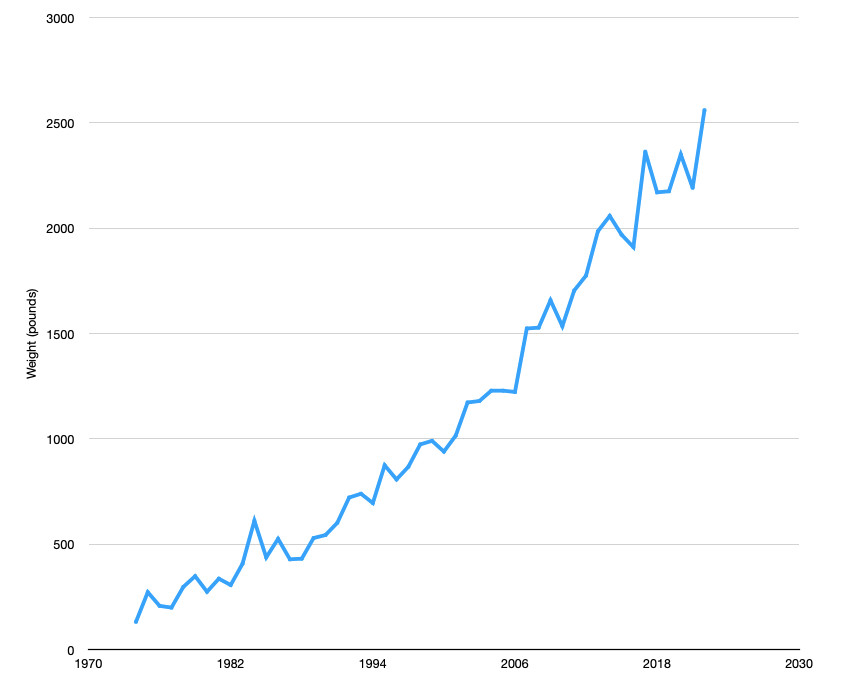
Weight of the winning pumpkin in the weigh-off in Half Moon Bay, 1974–2022

- The Safeway World Championship Pumpkin Weigh-Off attracts growers from around the United States. The weigh-off is held the Monday prior to the festival and the winners are on display during the festival weekend. In 2019 the Weigh-Off was awarded the Great Pumpkin Commonwealth's "World's Top Weigh-Off Site" award for having the ten heaviest pumpkins among the 114 GPC-sanctioned weigh-off sites worldwide. The heaviest pumpkin ever to win the contest was the champion in 2023, which weighed 2,749 pounds (1,247 kg).

List of champion pumpkins:
Year	Grower	Weight (pounds)
2023	Travis Gienger, Anoka, MN	2,749
2022	Travis Gienger, Anoka, MN	2,560
2021	Jeff Uhlmeyer, Olympia, WA	2,191
2020	Travis Gienger, Anoka, MN	2,350
2019	Leonardo Urena, Napa, CA	2,175
2018	Steve Daletas, Pleasant Hill, OR	2,170
2017	Joel Holland, Sumner, WA	2,363
2016	Cindy Tobeck, Little Rock, WA	1,910
2015	Steve Daletas, Pleasant Hill, OR	1,969
2014	John Hawkley, Napa, CA	2,058
2013	Gary Miller, Napa, CA	1,985
2012	Thad Starr, Pleasant Hill, OR	1,775
2011	Leonardo Urena, Napa, CA	1,704
2010	Ron Root, Citrus Heights, CA	1,535
2009	Don Young, Des Moines, IA	1,658
2008	Thad Starr, Pleasant Hill, OR	1,528
2007	Thad Starr, Pleasant Hill, OR	1,524
2006	Joel Holland, Puyallup, WA	1,223
2005	Joel Holland, Puyallup, WA	1,229
2004	Joel Holland, Puyallup, WA	1,229
2003	Steve Daletas, Pleasant Hill, OR	1,180
2002	Kirk Mombert, Harrisburg, OR	1,173
2001	Steve Daletas, Pleasant Hill, OR	1,016
2000	Kirk Mombert, Harrisburg, OR	940
1999	Jon Hunt, Elk Grove, CA	991
1998	Lincoln Mettler, Eatonville, WA	974
1997	Sherry LaRue, Tenino, WA	868
1996	Kirk Mombert, Harrisburg, OR	808
1995	Jack La Rue, Tenino, WA	875
1994 (tie)	Joel Holland, Puyallup, WA; Pete Glasier, Sequim, WA	696
1993	Joel Holland, Puyallup, WA	740
1992	Joel Holland, Puyallup, WA	722
1991	Cindi Glasier, Denver, CO	602
1990	Tom Borchard, Salinas, CA	544
1989	Mike Pezzini, Prunedale, CA	530
1988	Tom Borchard, Salinas, CA	432
1987	Tom Borchard, Salinas, CA	429
1986	Arthur Quint, Castro Valley, CA	526
1985	Arthur Quint, Castro Valley, CA	438
1984	Norm Gallagher, Cheland, WA	612
1983	Tom Borchard, Salinas, CA	408
1982	Tom Borchard, Salinas, CA	307
1981	Francis Collings, Petaluma, CA	337
1980	Tom Borchard, Salinas, CA	275
1979	Francis Collings, Petaluma, CA	349
1978	Francis Collings, Petaluma, CA	298
1977	Ray Chiesa, Half Moon Bay, CA	200
1976	John Minaidis, Half Moon Bay, CA	208
1975	John Minaidis, Half Moon Bay, CA	273
1974	John Minaidis, Half Moon Bay, CA	132

- Harvest inspired Arts and Crafts are represented by 250 artists and craftmakers. Original works are available in glass, ceramics, metals, fiber, leather, wood, jewelry and fine art.
- Food is a big item at the festival. Many food offerings include pumpkin such as pie, pancakes, bread, cheesecake, sausages, and ice cream. Local coastal favorites include Brussels sprouts, artichoke hearts, and Portuguese linguisa sandwiches. All food is provided by community non-profit groups.
- The Great Pumpkin Parade features the weigh-off champion pumpkin, marching bands, classic cars, and costumed children of all ages.
- Continuous entertainment is located on three stages throughout the festival. A variety of music is available from Country, to Blues, to Reggae.
- Family entertainment includes a costume contest, pumpkin carving, games, and a pie eating contest.
- Giant pumpkin carving is provided by Farmer Mike, a professional pumpkin carver that turns giant pumpkins (up to a thousand pounds) into faces and reliefs. Farmer Mike has carved at the event for 40 years.
- Local wine and microbrews offer wine and beer by the glass.
- Other attractions include a Sunday Pumpkin Run/Walk, a talent show, a pancake breakfast, giant pumpkin photos, a poster contest exhibit, and a haunted house.

== Traffic ==
The popular event attracts more than 200,000 people to this rural community. Major access from the greater San Francisco Bay Area is from Highway 92 to the east. North/South access from San Francisco or Santa Cruz is available using coastal Highway 1. The festival, combined with multiple pumpkin patches surrounding the town, generate severe traffic congestion each year. Parking is limited to side streets or paid parking in lots sponsored by local organizations.
