= A Fair to Remember (film) =

- Directed by: Allen Mondell; Cynthia Salzman Mondell
- Written by: Allen Mondell; Cynthia Salzman Mondell
- Produced by: Allen Mondell; Cynthia Salzman Mondell; Phillip Allen
- Narrated by: Barry Corbin
- Music by: Brave Combo
- Release date: February 2007
- Country: United States
- Language: English

A Fair to Remember is a documentary film about the State Fair of Texas that debuted in February 2007 at the Hall of State on the grounds of Fair Park in Dallas, Texas.

== Synopsis ==
The film chronicles the history of the State Fair of Texas beginning in 1886. It covers the banning of gambling at the fair, early Midway rides and some of Dallas' firsts such as electric lights, power stations and air planes. Old stock footage of the State Fair shows why it attracted people from all over the country. It includes scenes from the bake-offs and cook-offs held annually, plus a comical scene that has women singing a song about SPAM. A Fair to Remember also shows foods that have been included at the fair. Interviews of attendees provide a look into historical Dallas.

== Production ==
The film was written, directed and produced by Allen Mondell, Cynthia Salzman Mondell and co-produced by Phillip Allen. Narration is provided by actor and Texas native Barry Corbin. Original music provided by Brave Combo.

== Other films by the Mondells ==
- A Reason to Live
- Sisters of '77
