= Deep-fried Oreo =

Deep fried chocolate sandwich cookie

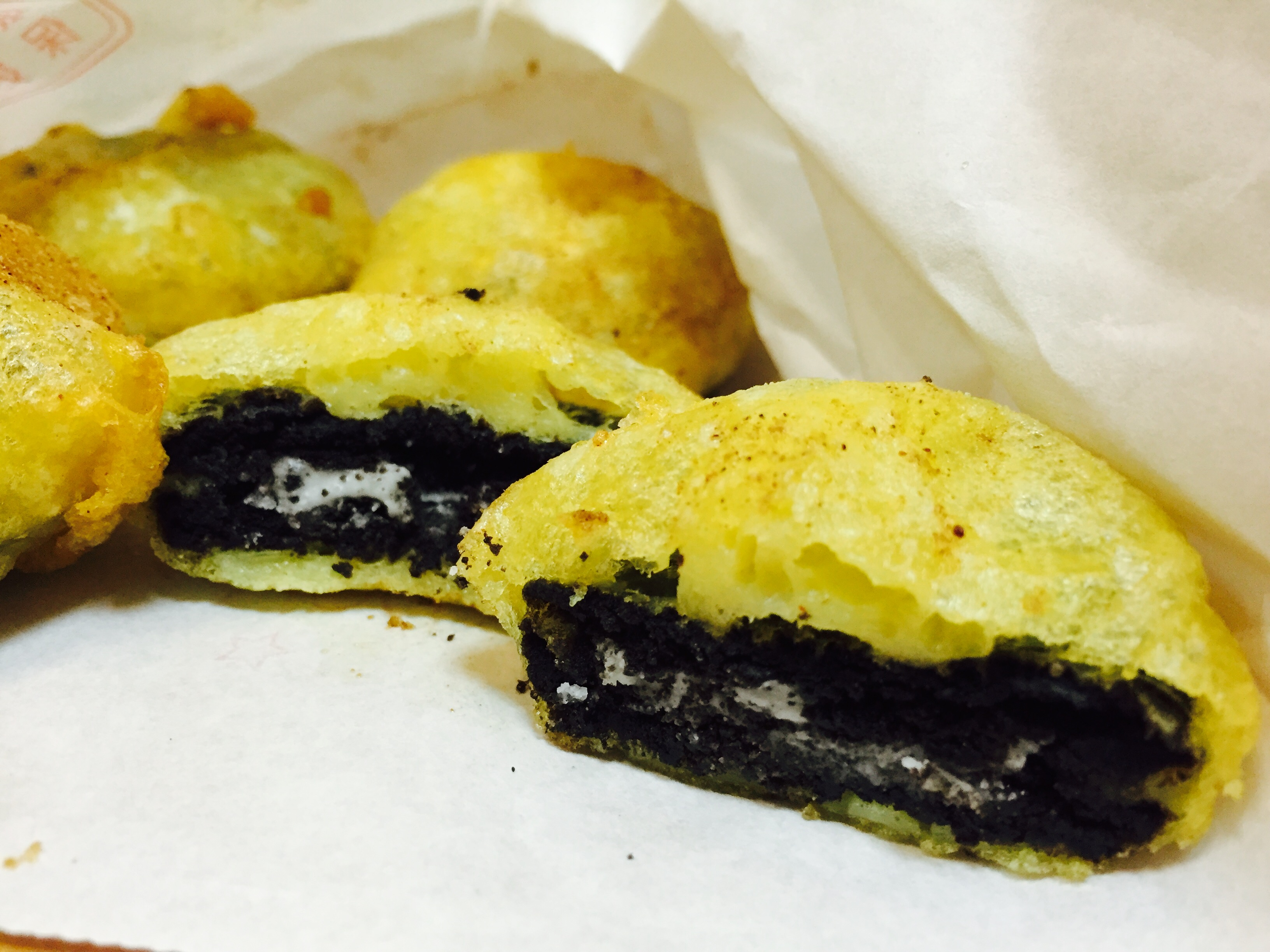
- Type: Dessert
- Place of origin: United States
- Main ingredients: Oreo cookies, batter, vegetable oil, powdered sugar

A deep-fried Oreo is a dessert consisting of a chocolate sandwich cookie which is dipped in batter and deep fried.

== History ==
Deep-fried Oreos were introduced in 2001 by Charlie Boghosian, also known as "Chicken Charlie" or "The Man Who Fries Everything," a 16-year-old Armenian settled in the United States, at the L.A. County Fair. Boghosian dipped Oreos in pancake batter, deep fried them, drizzled them with chocolate syrup and served them with powdered sugar. "There are many other fried foods at the fair, but I specialize in it. I make it my life," Boghosian said about deep-fried food. Aside from the deep-fried Oreo, he has also introduced new types of deep-fried food every year in different state fairs.

Since the debut of the deep-fried Oreo, it has now become common at carnivals and is a "cult favorite."

The deep-fried Oreo has become worldwide since its debut in 2002 at the Los Angeles County Fair and Texas State Fair. Outside of its birthplace, the United States, the deep-fried Oreo has been available in different countries all over the world, including Australia, Canada, Hong Kong, the Philippines, Singapore, Taiwan, Thailand, the United Arab Emirates, and the United Kingdom.

== Preparation ==
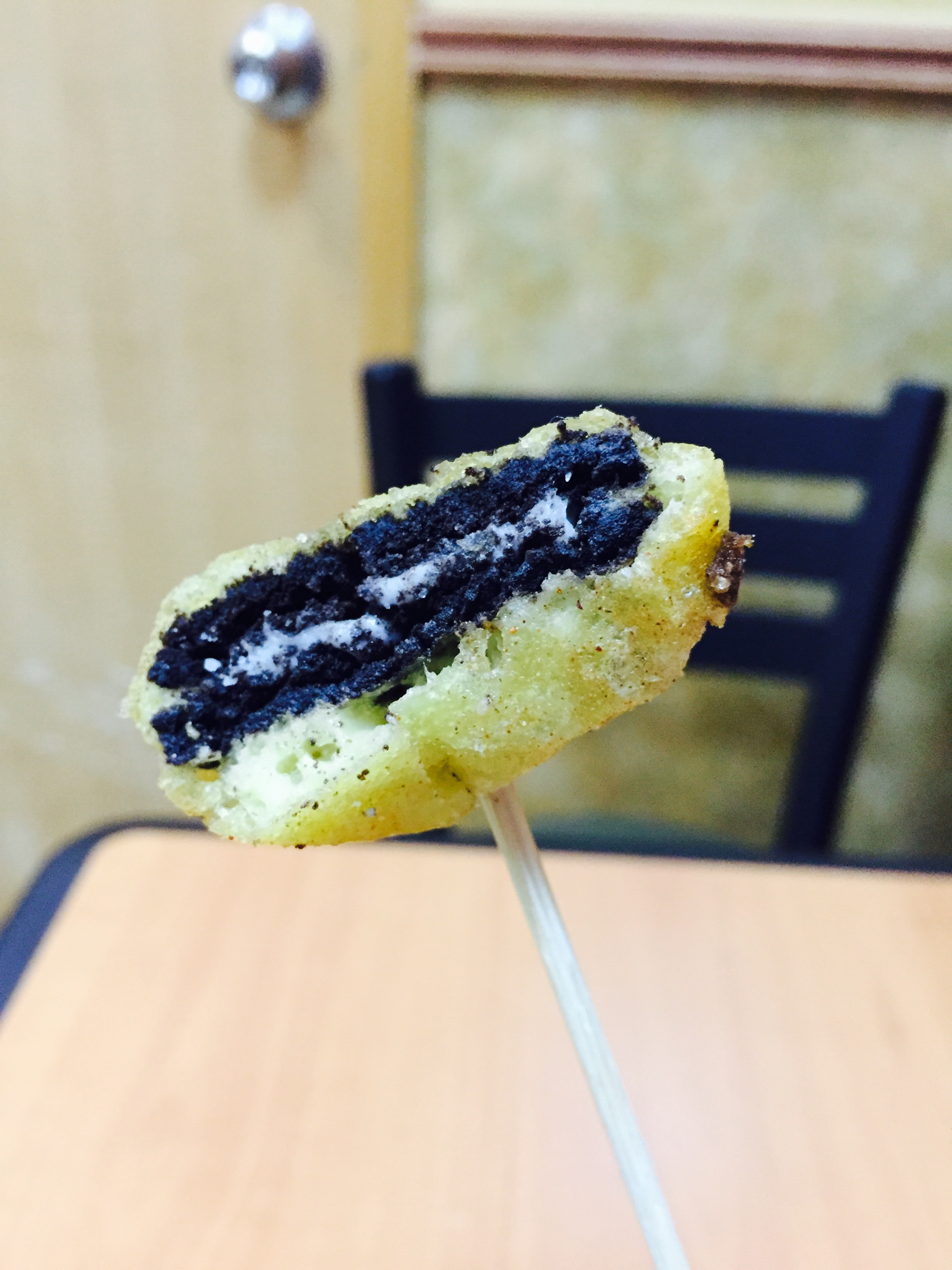
The inside of a deep-fried Oreo

Deep-fried Oreos are made with Oreo cookies, batter (usually made from buttermilk pancake mix and water), vegetable oil, and powdered sugar.

== Variations ==
Numerous variations of deep-fried Oreos have been derived from the typical recipe since its debut, including bacon deep-fried Oreos (deep-fried Oreos which are wrapped in slices of bacon); deep-fried Oreo ice cream, in which ice cream covered with egg mixture and crushed Oreo cookies is deep fried; and deep-fried Oreo burgers, which take the form of a deep-fried Oreo within a burger (including the patty) alongside other fillings, such as bacon.

== Reception ==
In 2013, the deep-fried Oreo won the Annual Big Tex Choice in the State Fair of Texas.

=== Popular culture ===
Deep-fried Oreos were also introduced on TV shows and viral videos by some celebrities. In 2012, a popular Taiwanese variety show by the name of Kangsi Coming also publicized the deep-fried Oreo. In the programme, an American talked about deep-fried Oreos, referring to it as one of the most popular foods in Taiwanese night markets.

In 2013, on The Jay Leno Show, Kim Kardashian cooked deep-fried Oreos with Guy Fieri and said about it: "It's like a once-a-year snack."

Yuka Kinoshita, a famous Japanese competitive eater, filmed a YouTube video of herself eating over 30 deep-fried Oreos in 2016. The video has exceeded 3 million views. In February 2023, Adam of the BeardMeatsFood channel finished 61 deep fried Oreos in a restaurant in Tennessee.

Deep-fried Oreos are included in a junk food encyclopedia titled Fast Food and Junk Food: An Encyclopedia of What We Love to Eat by Andrew F. Smith.

== See also ==
- List of deep fried foods
