= Farmer Mike =

Farmer Mike is the stage name of professional pumpkin carver Mike Valladao of Half Moon Bay, California. He specializes in carving giant pumpkins from 100 pounds to more than a half ton each at events such as the Half Moon Bay Art and Pumpkin Festival, the State Fair of Texas, Orange County MarketPlace, and the San Diego Zoo, as well as various hotels, casinos, and malls.

Farmer Mike is known for wearing orange overalls and a straw hat while carving in public. He has been featured in The Old Farmer's Almanac and Boys' Life magazine, and has appeared on The Tonight Show.

== Carving technique or style ==
Farmer Mike developed a technique known as "Pumpkin Carving in the Round", which takes advantage of the thick rind of giant pumpkins to provide a three-dimensional sculpted effect. His primary tool is a buck knife. Carvings have included whimsical faces, various animals, movie characters, dragons, landmarks, and caricatures of presidential candidates.

== History ==
In 1984 Mike saw a 612-pound (278 kg) pumpkin at California's Half Moon Bay Art and Pumpkin Festival. At the time it was the heaviest pumpkin ever grown. Mike contacted a grower for seeds and planted them. The following year, Mike had large Atlantic Giant pumpkins, but nothing to do with them. So he carved one. Word of his talent spread, and in 1986 he returned to Half Moon Bay as the festival's "official" pumpkin carver. He continues to hold that position and has carved at the festival for more than 20 years.

Farmer Mike is sometimes called the Pumpkin Picasso or the Picasso of the Pumpkin Patch. The San Francisco Examiner first called Mike the Pumpkin Picasso in 1997.

In 2008 Mike Valladao authored the illustrated children's book Farmer Mike Grows Giant Pumpkins.

== See also ==
- Pumpkin
