= Texas Star =

Ferris wheel at Fair Park in Dallas

Coordinates: 32.776738°N 96.759269°W

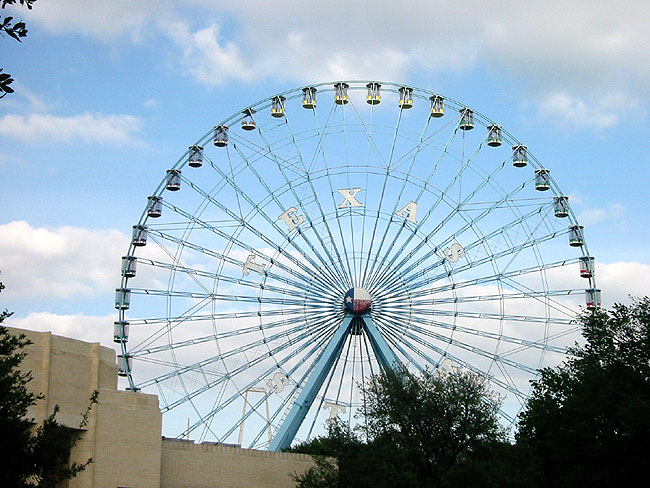
Texas Star
Height	216 feet (65.8 m)
Weight	678,554 lb (307,787 kg)
Cost	$2.2 million

Texas Star is a Ferris wheel at Fair Park in Dallas, Texas, where it operates during the annual State Fair of Texas as its most popular ride.

With an overall height of 216 feet (65.8 m), it was the tallest Ferris wheel in North America from 1985 until the opening of the 250-foot (76 m) Star of Puebla in Mexico, on 22 July 2013.

It can carry up to 264 passengers in its 44 gondolas.

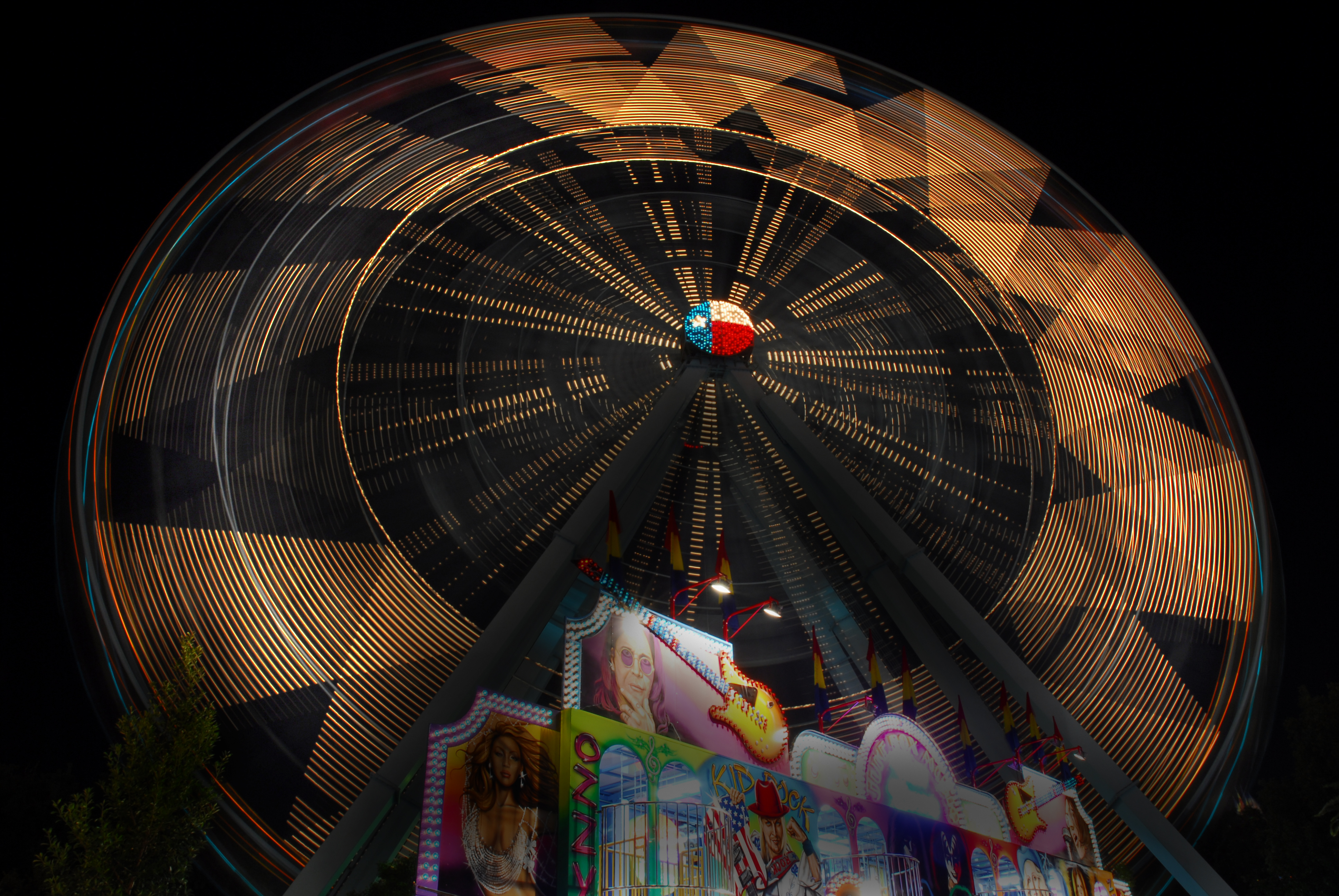
Texas Star illuminated at night

Built by SDC Corp. in Reggio Emilia, Italy, at a cost of $2.2 million, it was shipped to Dallas for its debut at the 1985 State Fair of Texas. The Texas Star was owned by Buster Brown and his wife, Barbara. After Buster died in an automobile accident in 1990, Barbara's brother, Mike Sandefur, bought a 50% stake in the Ferris wheel. Mike died in March 2018, followed by Barbara who died shortly after Easter Sunday in 2025. As of 2024, The Texas Star has been owned and operated by Talley Amusements, a company started by Barbara's eldest daughter Mary and her husband.

From 1985 to 2007 it was illuminated at night by 16,000 incandescent red, white, and blue turbolites. In 2008, this system was replaced with a longer-lasting, more energy-efficient LED system.
