= State Fair of Texas =

Annual fair held in Dallas, Texas, USA

- Genre: State fair
- Dates: Starts the last Friday of September and lasts 24 days. 25 September – 18 October (2026)
- Locations: Fair Park; 1300 Robert B Cullum Boulevard; Dallas, TX 75210
- Years active: 1886–1917; 1919–34; 1938–41; 1945–2019; 2021–present
- Attendance: 2.2 million (2021)
- Website: bigtex.com

The State Fair of Texas is an annual state fair held in Dallas at historic Fair Park. The fair has taken place every year since 1886 except for varying periods during World War I and World War II as well as 2020, due to the COVID-19 pandemic. It usually begins the last Friday in September and ends 24 days later. The fair claims an annual attendance of over two million visitors through ticket scanning. The State Fair of Texas is considered one of the best in America as well as Dallas' signature event despite its troubled history regarding, among other things, its relationship with the surrounding predominantly African-American community.

== Attractions ==
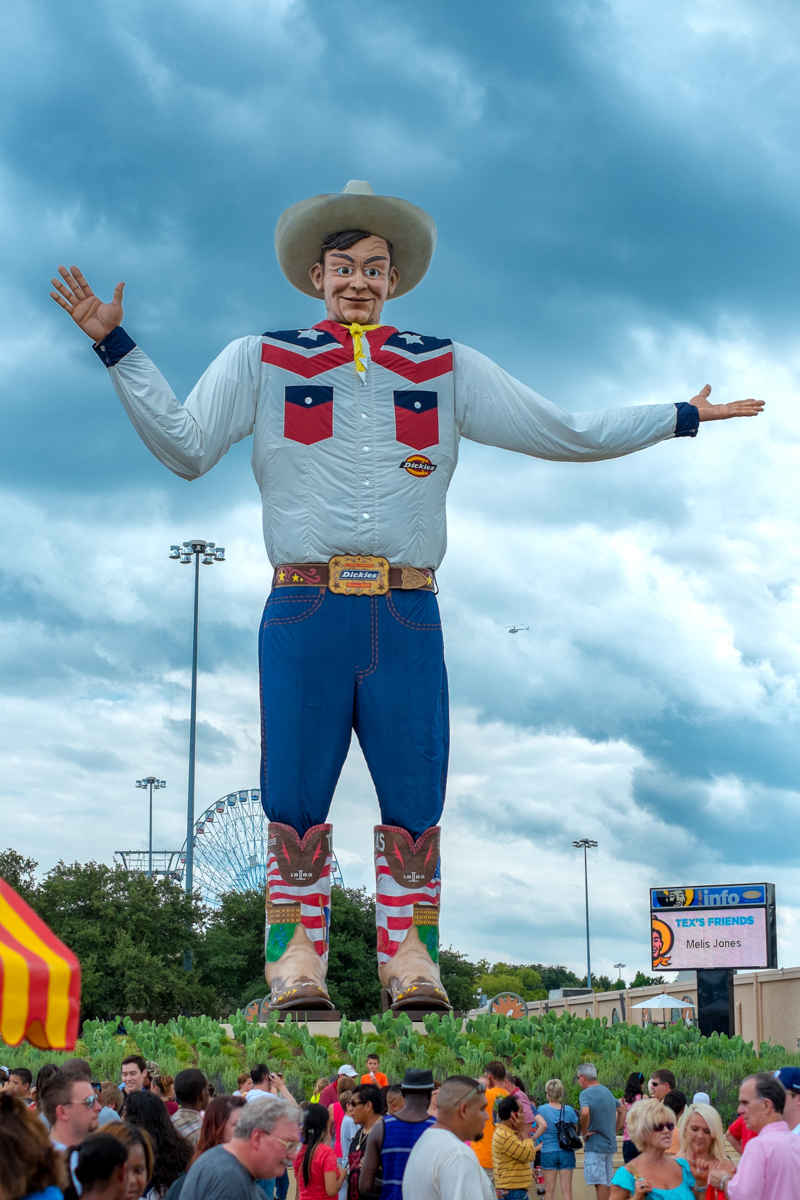
Big Tex in 2013

Security guards, the Dallas Police, the Dallas County Sheriff's Office & Texas Highway Patrol are the fair's patrollers.

The State Fair of Texas's opening day ceremonies are highlighted by the annual Friday parade rolling through downtown Dallas. In 2019, the parade moved to Fair Park. The fair also has a nightly parade called the Starlight Parade and a nightly light show called Illumination Sensation around the park's esplanade. However, the start of the fair is largely viewed negatively by local residents, as the blight it creates is so severe that it depresses the real estate value of neighboring homes, which are already in a depressed neighborhood. In addition, nearby businesses lose money while the fair is in operation.

Traditionally, the centerpiece of the fair has been the annual college football game between Oklahoma and Texas, nicknamed the Red River Rivalry (historically known as both the "OU-Texas Game" or "Texas-OU Game") and played in the Cotton Bowl at Fair Park. Also, the State Fair Classic, featuring Grambling State University and Prairie View A&M University, is played at the Cotton Bowl during the fair. In 2010, Baylor and Texas Tech played their game during the fair for the first time. During the opening weekend of the 2013 fair, Army and Louisiana Tech played in the only Heart of Dallas Classic at the Cotton Bowl; it was abandoned thereafter. The Texas State Fair Football Showdown took place on the third weekend of the 2018 and 2019 fair and featured Southern and Texas Southern. In 2020, the Southern versus Texas Southern game moved to Arlington, Texas.

The State Fair of Texas is the only fair in the United States to include a full auto show, dating back to 1913. However, the Texas Museum of Automotive History was forced to pull out as a tenant, blaming the fair for forcing it to close down during the annual event.

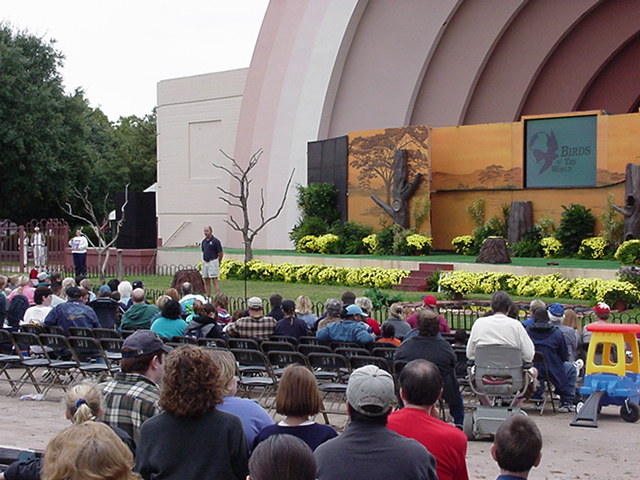
Birds of the World show at the Band Shell in 2001

The State Fair formerly featured "Birds of the World" where several birds would fly overhead. It was removed from the Fair lineup in 2014, only to return in 2019. The $5-million Texas Skyway is a gondola ride which only operates 24 days a year, transporting visitors around the fairgrounds. There is also a BMX bike show as well as dog and pig races. For children, puppet shows, Children's Medical Center Barnyard, and Story Time also take place inside the fair.

In recent years, the fair has emphasized its reputation as an event featuring unique, albeit high-fat, foods. It has been known for years for Fletcher's brand corny dogs. Recent years have seen the introduction of new unusual deep-fried items, including deep-fried Oreos, deep-fried Twinkies, deep-fried s'mores, deep-fried pork ribs, fried cheesecake; deep-fried butter, fried avocados, fried alligators, deep-fried peanut butter, jelly, and banana sandwiches, and most recently a batter-based fried Coke. New foods in 2008 included chicken fried bacon and fried banana splits. For the 2012 fair, the Girl Scouts of Northeast Texas added the deep-fried Samoa cookie in honor of the 100th anniversary of Girl Scouts of the US and the Girl Scout 100th Anniversary Experience at the Texas Hall of State at the fair. People travel from all around the world to attend the State Fair of Texas, including former talk show host Oprah Winfrey.

2025 saw boba drinks, as it was seen at other state and county fairs nationwide, and shows worldwide. The fair announced that the log ride would close after the 2025 season.

== History ==
The first state fair in Texas was established by the Mechanical and Blood Stock Association of Texas (MBSAT). The first fair convened in Houston on the north bank of Buffalo Bayou in 1870. The MBSAT hosted another state fair at the same location in 1871. Beginning in 1872, the fair moved to a new location south of Houston in an area more recently known as "Midtown", until the last state fair held by the MBSAT in 1878. After its last fair, the MBSAT declared bankruptcy, and no other organization in Houston emerged to restart the state fair in Houston.

In its modern incarnation, the State Fair of Texas was charted as a private corporation by local businessmen. It was an immediate success and attracted thousands of people. However, in 1904 a series of events led to a financial crisis and not enough income was available to keep the fair running. Therefore, the businessmen sold it to the city of Dallas with the agreement that 24 days during the fall would be set aside annually for the fair and exhibition.

On February 10, 1942, a fire-alarm blaze raged unchecked for an hour in the automobile building at the State Fair park causing damage estimated at several hundred thousand dollars. One fireman was hospitalized after being overcome with smoke and a half dozen others were given treatment at the scene. Roy Rupard, secretary of the State Fair association, said the loss was covered by insurance.

Big Tex, a 55-foot (17 m) tall cowboy statue, has been its symbol since his introduction in 1952. In 1953, Big Tex's jaw was hinged, so that he appears to "speak" the announcements that promote fair events. After a fire on October 19, 2012, destroyed the original Big Tex, he was rebuilt and reintroduced for the 2013 fair. Big Tex is claimed to be the world's tallest cowboy.

Its 212-foot (65 m) Texas Star Ferris wheel was the largest in North America when it debuted in October 1985, just months before the Texas Sesquicentennial. It has since been dwarfed by Ferris wheels in Las Vegas and Orlando.

DART's Fair Park Station and MLK Jr. Station opened in 2009 to serve Fair Park and the State Fair. In addition to regular service on the Green Line, the Red Line and Blue Line also run "special event" trains to Fair Park Station for major fair events.

In 2017, Foundation for Community Empowerment commissioned a major report laying a major portion of blame against how the State Fair of Texas has hindered development at and around Fair Park.

=== Timeline ===
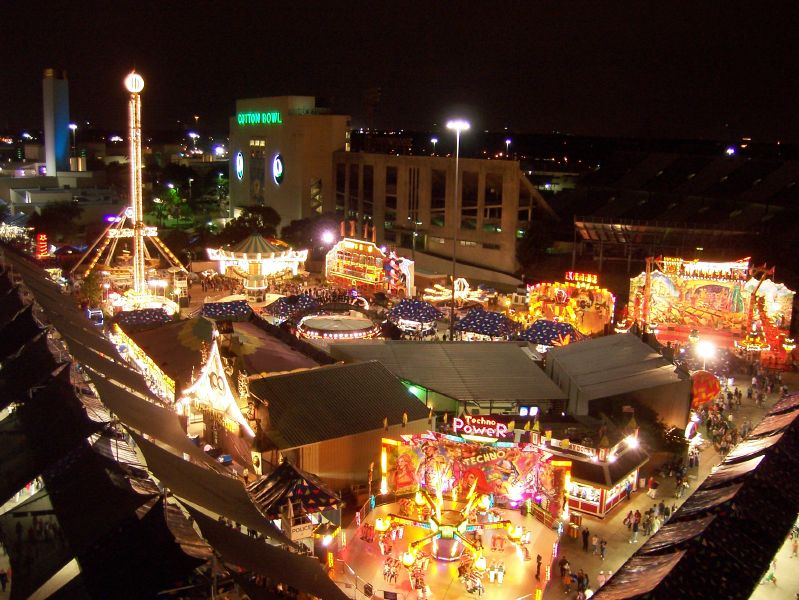
A glimpse of the State Fair of Texas at night in 2006

- The State Fair of Texas opened its gates for the first time on October 26, 1886. Approximately 14,000 people attended the opening day.
- On November 7, 1886, the Fair closed, having attracted over 100,000 people its first year.
- The State Fair of Texas had a history of racial discrimination dating back to the 1880s. The first designated day for African Americans to attend the fair was held in 1889 and was called "Colored People's Day". Educator Norman Washington Harllee organized exhibits and planned events and speakers including Booker T. Washington in 1900. In 1910, "Colored People's Day" was discontinued. It reappeared in 1936 as "Negro Achievement Day", set to coincide with the Texas Centennial Exposition. Despite the fact that African Americans were not allowed to participate in entertainment or eat at restaurants and concession stands on other days during the run, Fair officials touted "Negro Achievement Day" as a way to recognize the accomplishments and progress of the Negro race in Texas and the United States. The Hall of Negro Life was the only building demolished after the Texas Centennial ended.
- In 1913, the Fair introduced the first Automobile Building, where 175 vehicles were exhibited.
- The Fair was canceled in 1918 due to the US Army taking control of Fair Park to establish an aviation boot camp known as Camp Dick. It resumed the next year.
- In 1921, Boston College beat Baylor in the first game ever played between teams from the Southwest and Northeast.
- In 1921, Texas and Vanderbilt started a series, which was played at the Fair every year from 1921 to 1928 with the exception of 1924.
- In 1923, the Fair hosted Ku Klux Klan day. Thousands of new Klan members were sworn in at the fairgrounds. More than 150,000 people were at the Fair that day.
- In 1925, the first State Fair Classic was played.
- In 1929, Texas and Oklahoma played their Red River Rivalry at the Fair for the first time.
- In 1930, construction of a new Fair Park Stadium (now known as the Cotton Bowl) began.
- In 1932, Texas and Oklahoma played their Red River Rivalry at the new Fair Park Stadium for the first time.
- In 1937, the first Cotton Bowl Classic was played in Fair Park.
- World War II cancelled fairs from 1942 to 1944. In September 1945, the Fair resumed and was held for the next 75 consecutive years.
- Big Tex made his first appearance in 1952.
- In 1955, a seat filled with members of the Memphis High School marching band broke free from the top of a 92-foot Sky Wheel, killing a 15-year-old girl. Also that year, a Denton, Texas, high-school senior, Doris Mae Dukes, was named Miss Bronze Texas from among 15 Texas high-school and college contestants during the Fair's "Negro Achievement Day". The award was presented by a Neiman Marcus official.
- In 1956, the Trailblazer monorail began operation at Fair Park. It was the first commercially-operated monorail system in the United States.
- Elvis Presley performed in the Cotton Bowl during the Fair in 1956.

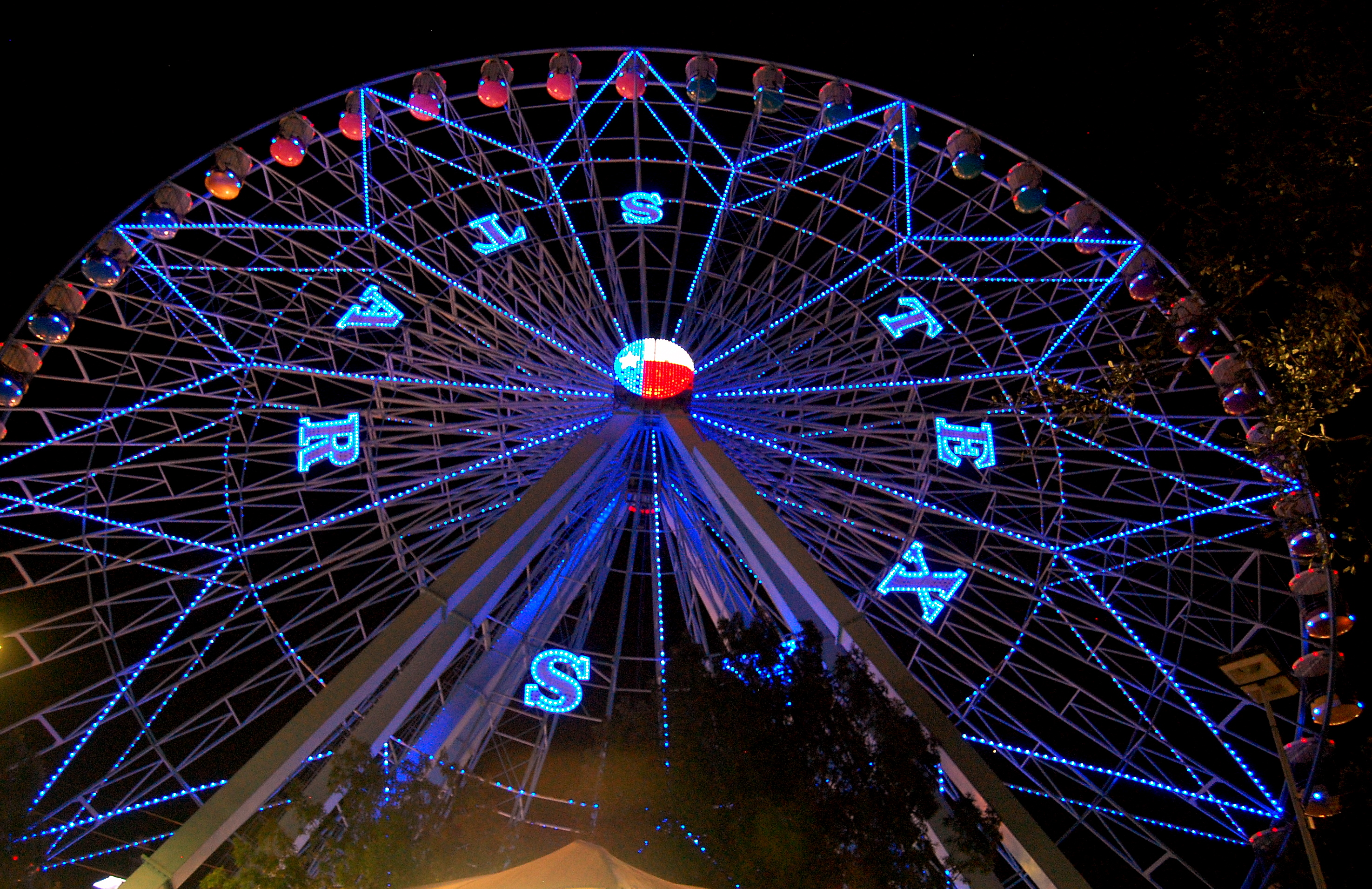
Texas Star Ferris wheel at night

- In 1960, the Dallas Texans (AFL) and the Dallas Cowboys (NFL) played their first seasons in the Cotton Bowl.
- In 1964, the monorail closed and was replaced by the Swiss Sky Ride, a 64-car aerial ride that traveled over a 3,800-foot path, the longest ever built.
- In 1966, the State Fair commissioned a report on the redevelopment of the Fair, which concluded that the land around Fair Park should be "bought up and turned into a paved, lighted, fenced parking lot" that would "eliminate the problem from sight". "If the poor Negroes in their shacks cannot be seen, all the guilt feelings . . . will disappear, or at least be removed from primary consideration". As a result, numerous homes were taken through eminent domain condemnation, and the mostly poor African-American owners were underpaid for their property.
- In 1979, a Sky Ride accident occurred during the last day of the Fair, prompting the removal of the attraction.
- In 1983, an 18-year-old boy was killed and several bystanders were injured when a gondola fell off the Enterprise.
- In 1985, the Texas Star opened as the largest ferris wheel in North America.
- In 1989, The Comet Roller Coaster, a Fair Park landmark since 1947, was torn down.
- Following the 2001 September 11 attacks, Dallas Police and State Fair officials announced the implementation of new security measures during the annual event.
- In 2005, the Fried Peanut Butter, Jelly and Banana Sandwich was introduced at the Fair.

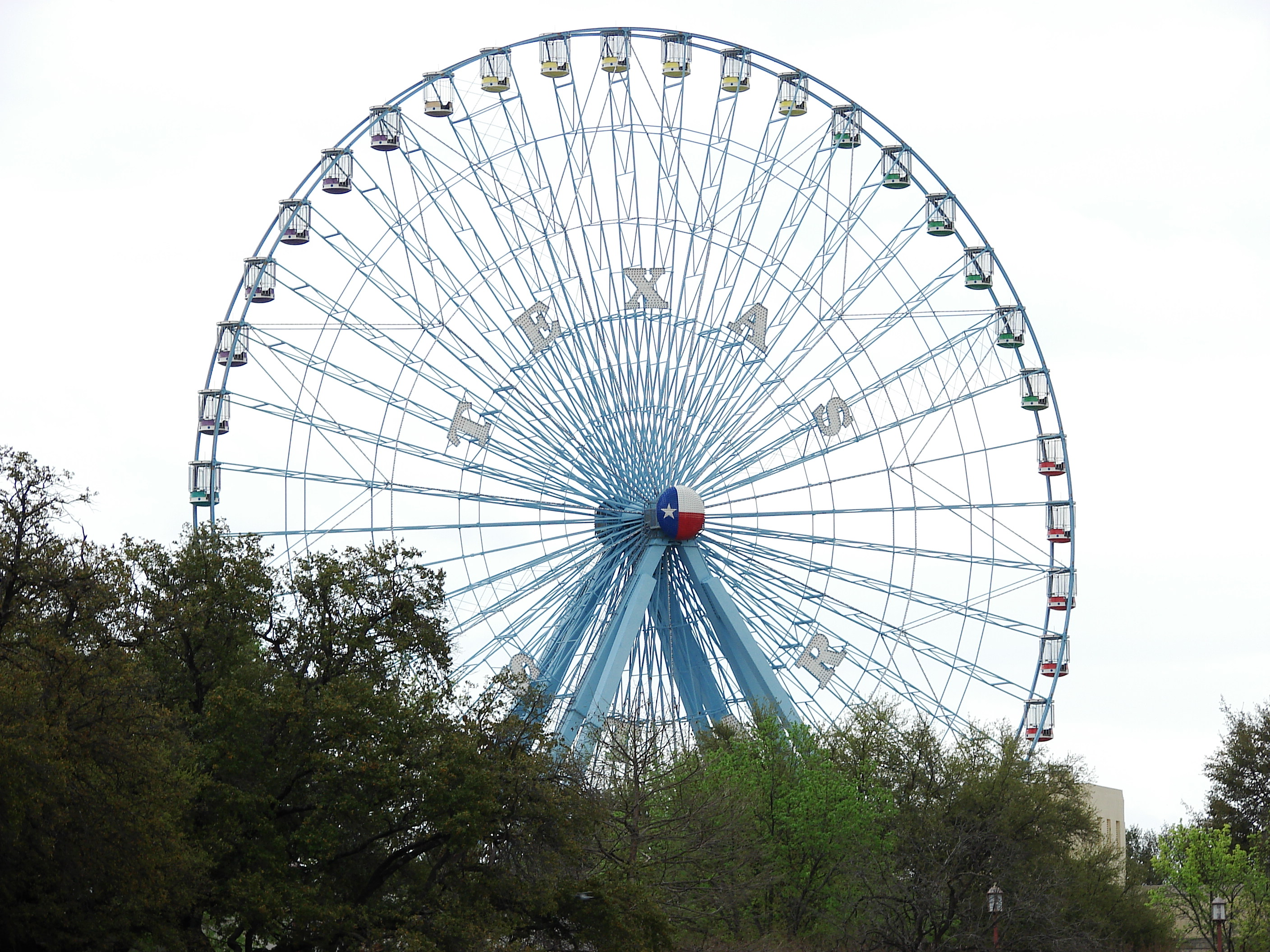
The Texas Star ferris wheel ride

- In 2007 the Texas Skyway aerial ride opened in Fair Park.
- In 2010, the 8000-foot Greenhouse on the Midway was built to house 1000 hanging baskets, beehives, and Farmer Mike the Pumpkin Carver.
- In 2010, fairgoers spent more than $37 million, which broke the Fair's record.
- On October 19, 2012, Big Tex caught fire, burning it down to the skeletal frame, with only the right arm remaining.
- In 2013:
  - The State Fair opened a new attraction, a 500-foot observation tower called "Top o' Texas Tower", as part of a renovation of part of the Midway called "Summer Adventures at Fair Park". The "Tower" now operates only 24 days a year, despite a construction cost of over $11 million.
  - The State Fair operated Summer Adventures in Fair Park, a beach-themed amusement park, from May to August. Despite a $30 million investment in Summer Adventures, the event was shuttered after just one season. Jim Schutze of the Dallas Observer wrote, "The sudden collapse of a $30 million venture has to be some kind of red flag, some indication that it's time to re-examine the whole thing."
  - A new Big Tex was unveiled the day before the Fair opened.
- In 2014:
  - In September, a blue-ribbon task force appointed by Mayor Mike Rawlings submitted a report on the rejuvenation of Fair Park. The Mayor's Task Force plan envisioned a public-private partnership led by a nonprofit organization to be charged with overarching powers to control the revitalization of Fair Park, including the State Fair of Texas. Architect/City Planner Antonio Di Mambro, with international experience in infrastructure planning and neighborhood revitalization, encouraged the mayor to use the Task Force report as a building block for constructive dialogue with residents, stakeholders and the neighborhoods around Fair Park. Following the presentation of the Task Force Plan, Mayor Mike Rawlings said, "I felt passion by all the council and park board members that they want Fair Park to be all it can be and they're interested in taking this big challenge on".
  - In October, the State Fair came under fire for spending over $5 million on attorneys' fees to two insiders.
- In 2015:
  - In March, the State Fair pushed back on any notion of tightening up the footprint of its current operation. Dallas Morning News reporter Robert Wilonsky called the State Fair's response "rather dramatic." The article also quoted Stephen Page of the closed Texas Museum of Automotive History from 2012 as saying, "The City's requirement that tenants vacate the majority of the buildings in Fair Park during the State Fair is the principal reason for Fair Park's ongoing decline." Wilonsky also quoted a "prominent member of the Mayor's Task Force" as suggesting privately "that the State Fair's presence at Fair Park also needs to be greatly reduced."
  - In May, the Park and Recreation Board voted unanimously to recommend and approve the Mayor's Task Force Plan and recommended that underground parking structures be built rather than as initially recommended by the Task Force.
  - In August, the State Fair was sanctioned more than $75,000 for filing a SLAPP suit against a lawyer who had requested financial documents from the State Fair. On August 2, 2016, the Dallas Court of Appeals reversed in its entirety the judgment against the State Fair of Texas, holding that the trial court erred in, among other things, finding that the State Fair's lawsuit was a SLAPP suit.
- On September 9, 2017, Charlie Daniels performed and played his famous song "The Devil Went Down to Georgia" at the Fair.
- On September 5, 2019, the State Fair of Texas was ordered by the Court of Appeals for the Fifth District of Texas at Dallas to compensate Riggs & Ray, P.C. for its appeal of the August 2, 2016, ruling.
- On July 7, 2020, it was announced that due to the COVID-19 pandemic in Texas, the State Fair of Texas would be cancelled. This was the first cancellation since WWII, 76 years prior.
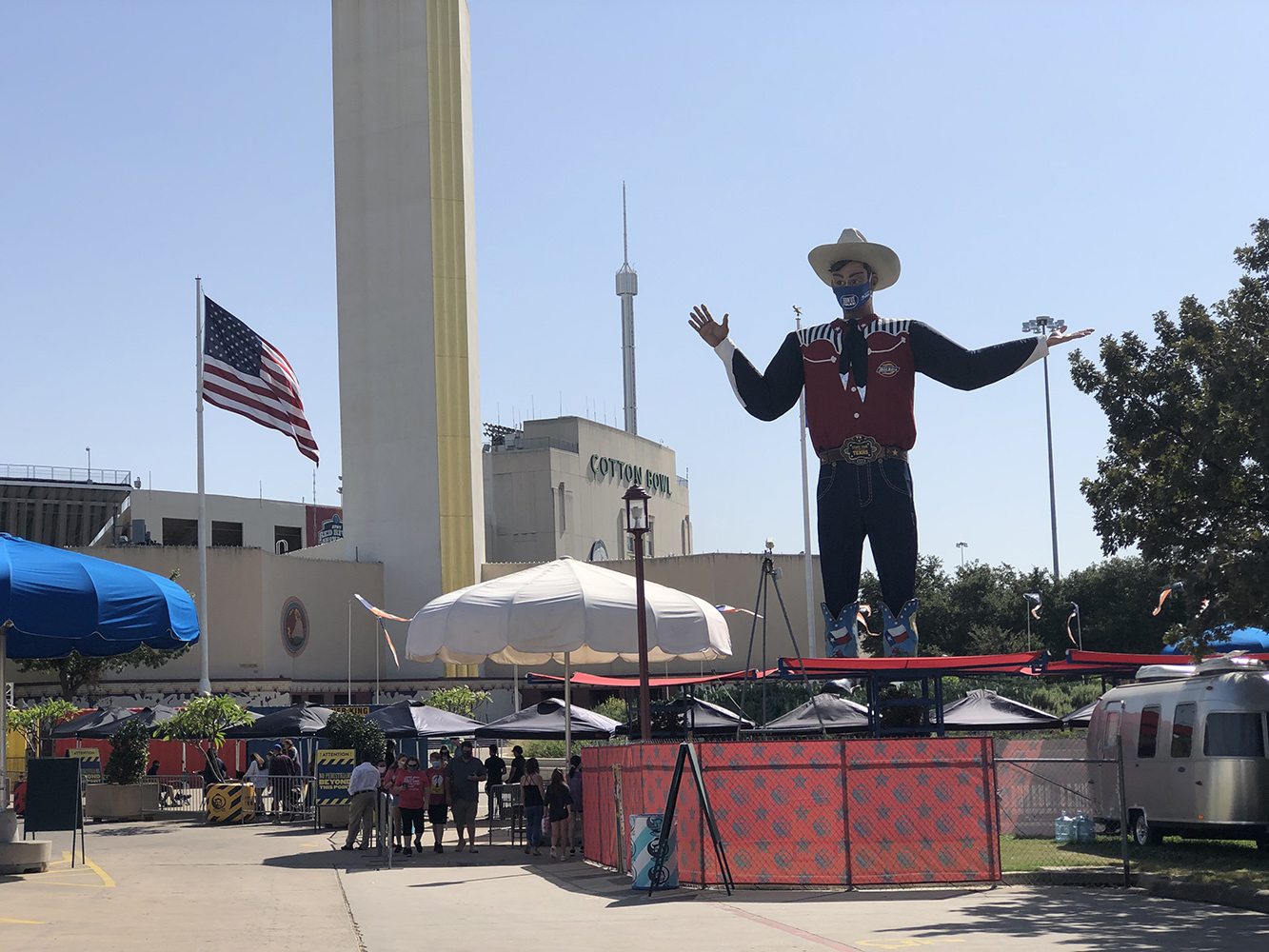
  Big Tex wearing a mask during the 2020 pandemic
  The State Fair operated as a drive-through event. Photo ops were offered with a masked Big Tex.
- In September 2021, the Fair resumed after a one-year hiatus.
- On the evening of October 15, 2023, shots were fired at the Fair. Three people were injured as a result. The Fair delayed reopening until 2:00 pm the next day. The suspect was caught and charged with three counts of aggravated assault with a deadly weapon.

=== Controversies ===
==== Racial segregation ====
For the majority of time the State Fair of Texas has been in operation, it was a segregated fair. African Americans were allowed into the fair only on "Negro Achievement Day", known colloquially as "Nigger Day" by the white population. The end of the segregated fair began in 1953 under increasing pressure to desegregate. In that year, African Americans were allowed in the fair for the full season, but were not served in restaurants or allowed on the Midway. Only on Negro Achievement Day were African Americans allowed full access to the fairgrounds. The Dallas Negro Chamber of Commerce, under pressure from the African American community, began to denounce the State Fair as segregated. White Dallas leaders continued to assert that the fair was not segregated. In the mid-1950's, then mayor R. L. Thornton, one of the founding men of the Dallas Citizens Council who helped fundraise for the 1936 Centennial Exposition, agreed to desegregate more, but continued to assert that some restaurants and attractions remain separate. Notably, two attractions that involved physical contact, the "Laff in the Dark" and "Dodge 'em Scooter" rides, continued to be segregated.

In 1955, Juanita Craft organized a protest of the State Fair of Texas against its policy of admitting blacks only on "Negro Achievement Day".

In addition, the fair once had a "Colored People's Day", "Ku Klux Klan Day" and, as recently as the 1980s, a day dedicated to the Confederacy. In the 1960s, the fair looked at market research showing that many white fairgoers were frightened by seeing black people on their way into the fair leading to an aggressive eminent domain campaign to buy nearby homes to convert the land into parking lots.

The State Fair in 1966 commissioned a report on the redevelopment of the fair, which concluded that the land around Fair Park should be 'bought up and turned into a paved, lighted, fenced parking lot" that would 'eliminate the problem from sight'. "If the poor Negroes in their shacks cannot be seen, all the guilt feelings…will disappear, or at least be removed from primary consideration".

The fair's segregation practices and policies formally and fully ended on October 7, 1967.

==== Other ====
The State Fair was criticized in October 2014 for spending over $5 million on attorneys fees to two insiders.

Despite a $30 million investment in Summer Adventures, the event was shuttered after just one season.

In August 2015, the State Fair was sanctioned more than $75,000 for filing a SLAPP suit against a lawyer who had requested financial documents from the State Fair. On August 2, 2016, the Dallas Court of Appeals reversed in its entirety the judgment against the State Fair of Texas, holding that the trial court erred in, among other things, finding that the State Fair's lawsuit was a SLAPP suit.

== Economics, finances and management ==
=== Attendance ===
Staff of the State Fair have traditionally reported that attendance at the fair runs in the vicinity each year of between 3 and 3.5 million people. These figures were disputed in an April 2016 study published by Tom Kelly, Ph.D., a professor of economics at Baylor University and the Director of Baylor University Center for Business and Economic Research, along with Bennet Hickok, an Economics student at Baylor. The Kelly/Hickok report argues that the attendance at the fair is about 1.5-1.7 million visitors a year, or about half of what state fair staff reported it to be. According to the 2017 State Fair of Texas Annual Report, the Fair attracted a total of 2,250,433 attendees during the 2017 event with roughly 93,000 daily guests. The total annual reported attendance for 2018 dropped to 2,049,119 with a net operating revenue loss of $3,199,044 for the year.

In 2025, attendance was 2,020,064, which was 365,791 less than the previous year. The 15.3 percent drop in attendance marked the lowest attendance numbers in eight years. Organizers and observers blamed the drop on a number of potential factors, including high prices in an uncertain economy, fear of Immigrations and Customs Enforcement (ICE) raids, a decision to discontinue free passes for Dallas high school students, and unseasonably warm temperatures.

=== Economic impact on surrounding businesses ===
The 2016 Kelly/Hickok study found that the State Fair generates around $50 million for the area economy. This is in contrast to the figure of $600 million in impact that the State Fair itself has traditionally reported.

=== How excess revenue is spent ===
The State Fair has a lease with Fair Park, the terms of which require that any profit or excess revenue it generates be spent "for the development and enhancement of Fair Park and the Fair". In May 2016, the State Fair released a list of capital projects for the past 10 years, detailing how the fair had spent their excess revenue. According to media reports, 90% of excess revenue was spent on projects that solely benefited the State Fair. A survey of Fair Park revealed out of the 277 acres available, 200 are covered in asphalt or concrete, compared to 10 acres of green space.

=== Staff compensation ===
In 2014, Errol McKoy, the former President of the State Fair of Texas, received $1.425 million in compensation. Excessive executive compensation is a constant and major complaint of the fair.

Name	Title	2017 Salary
Mitchell Glieber	President	$641,628
Jamire Navarro	CFO	$326,970
Robert Hilbun	GM/SVP	$370,522
Daryl Real	SVP Livestock	$226,464
Carey Risinger	SVP Concessions	$250,075
Jennifer Schuder	SVP, Marketing	$232,646
Russell Fitzgerald	SVP - Operations	$231,842
Karissa Condoianis	SVP, Public Relations	$166,738
Jason K. Hays	Director, Creative Media	$149,973
Robert Forswall	Director, Purchasing	$122,468
Margaret Hannah	Director, Human Resources	$127,389
Kelly Pound	Director, Exhibitor	$125,122
Susan Brosin	Director, Development	$116,900
Errol McKoy	Former President	$42,599

=== Audits ===
On May 13, 2016, the City of Dallas Auditor, Craig Kinton, released an audit regarding Fair Park Business Partners, which included the State Fair of Texas. The audit concluded the City of Dallas had no way to ensure the State Fair was adequately investing in Fair Park, per the terms of the contract between the City of Dallas and State Fair.

== See also ==
- A Fair To Remember (documentary)
- Fair Park
- Hall of State
- Heart of Dallas Classic
- State Fair Classic
- African dodger
