= Walter's =

Defunct music venue in Houston, United States

Coordinates: 29.7698°N 95.3575°W

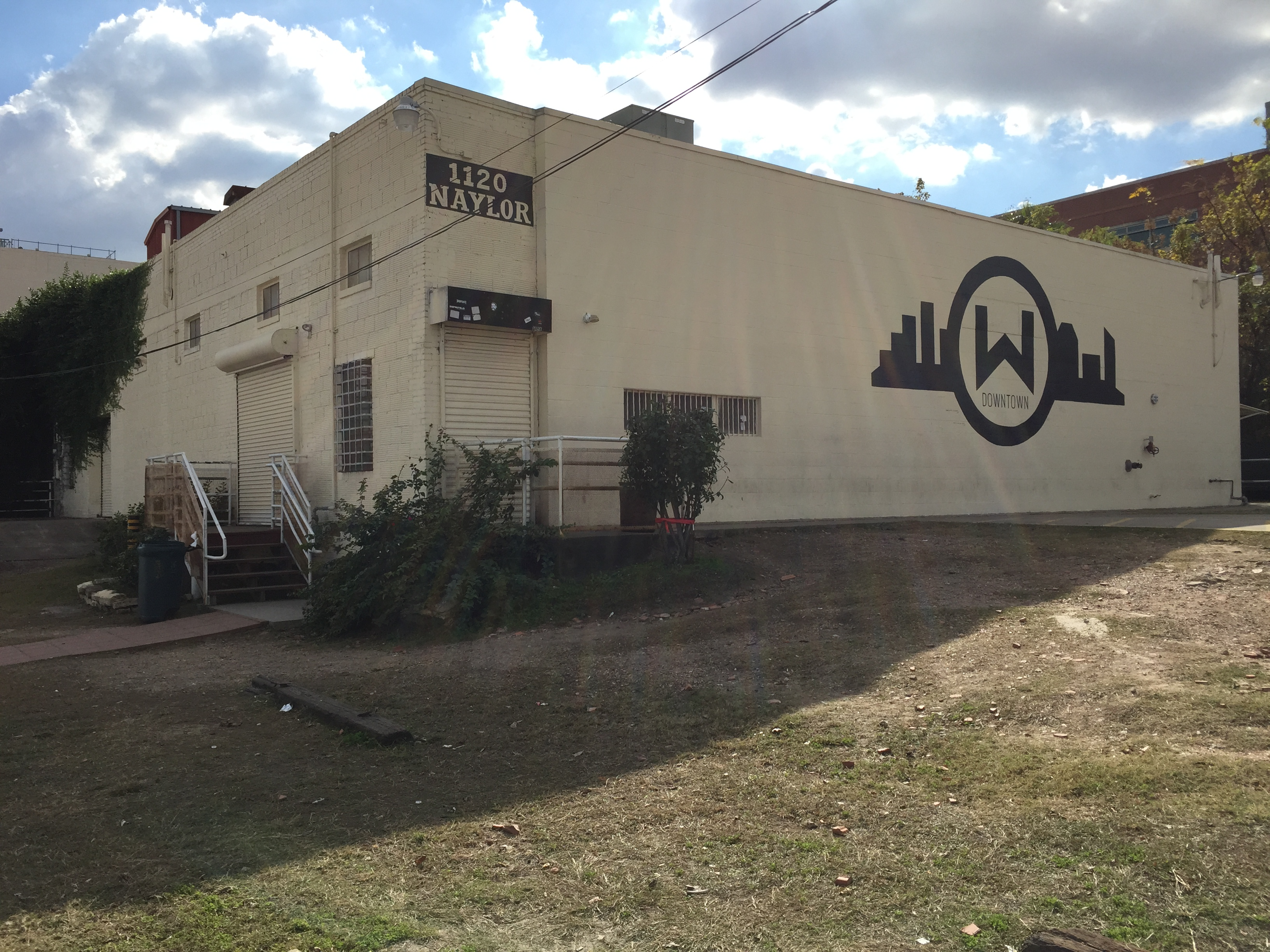
- Interactive map of Walter's
- Former names: Walter's on Washington (2000–2011)
- Address: 1120 Naylor Street; Houston, Texas
- Location: Northside Village
- Owner: Zack Palmer
- Capacity: 190
- Type: Nightclub
- Events: Metal, Punk rock, Hardcore punk, Indie rock, Rock, Blues

Construction
- Opened: December 25, 2011
- Closed: February 4th, 2018

Website
- waltersdowntown.com

Walter's (formerly Walter's on Washington) was a music venue in the Northside Village neighborhood of Houston, Texas. Originally opening in 2000 at 4215 Washington Avenue, the venue permanently moved to 1120 Naylor Street on December 25, 2011. The club hosted both local and touring musical acts.

The founding owner of the club, Pam Robinson, died in 2014 at the age of 55 after a fight with cancer. Her son Zack Palmer took over the reins in November 2014.

Walter's closed for good on February 4, 2018, after issues with property taxes.
