= Big Tex =

Icon of the annual State Fair of Texas

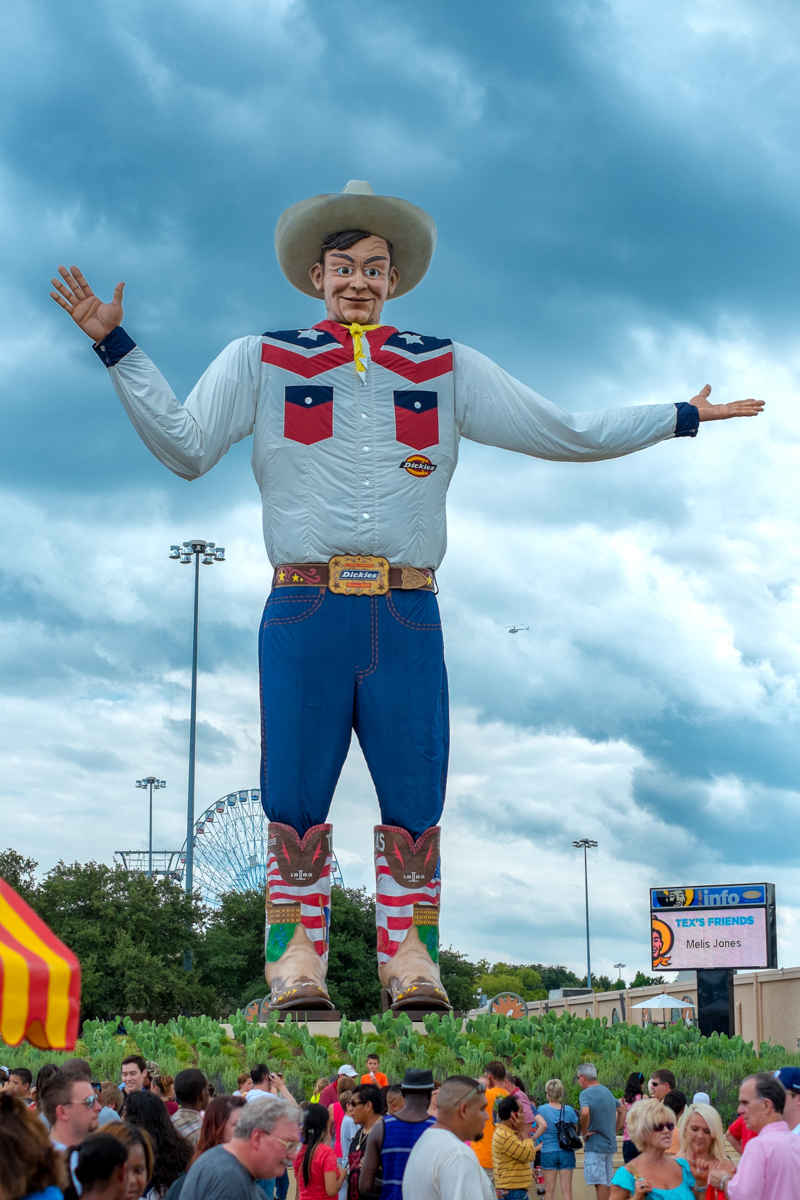
- Big Tex in 2013

- Location within Texas

General information
- Location: Fair Park in Dallas
- Coordinates: 32.7797°N 96.7644°W
- Completed: 2013 (1949–2012, original)

Height
- Height: 55 feet

Big Tex is a 55-foot (17 m) tall figure and marketing icon of the annual State Fair of Texas held at Fair Park in Dallas, Texas, United States. The figure has become a cultural icon of Dallas and Texas. Since 1952, Big Tex has served as a cultural ambassador to visitors, and the figure's prime location in the fairgrounds serves as a traditional meeting point.

On October 19, 2012, the last weekend of the 2012 State Fair of Texas, Big Tex was destroyed by an electrical fire that started in the right boot and worked its way up the structure, first becoming visible from the neck area. After the fire, a new Big Tex was created by SRO Associates and Texas Scenic Co. This rendition made its first public appearance on September 26, 2013.

Big Tex donned a mask in September 2020 while the fair was on hiatus because of the COVID-19 pandemic in Texas.

== History ==
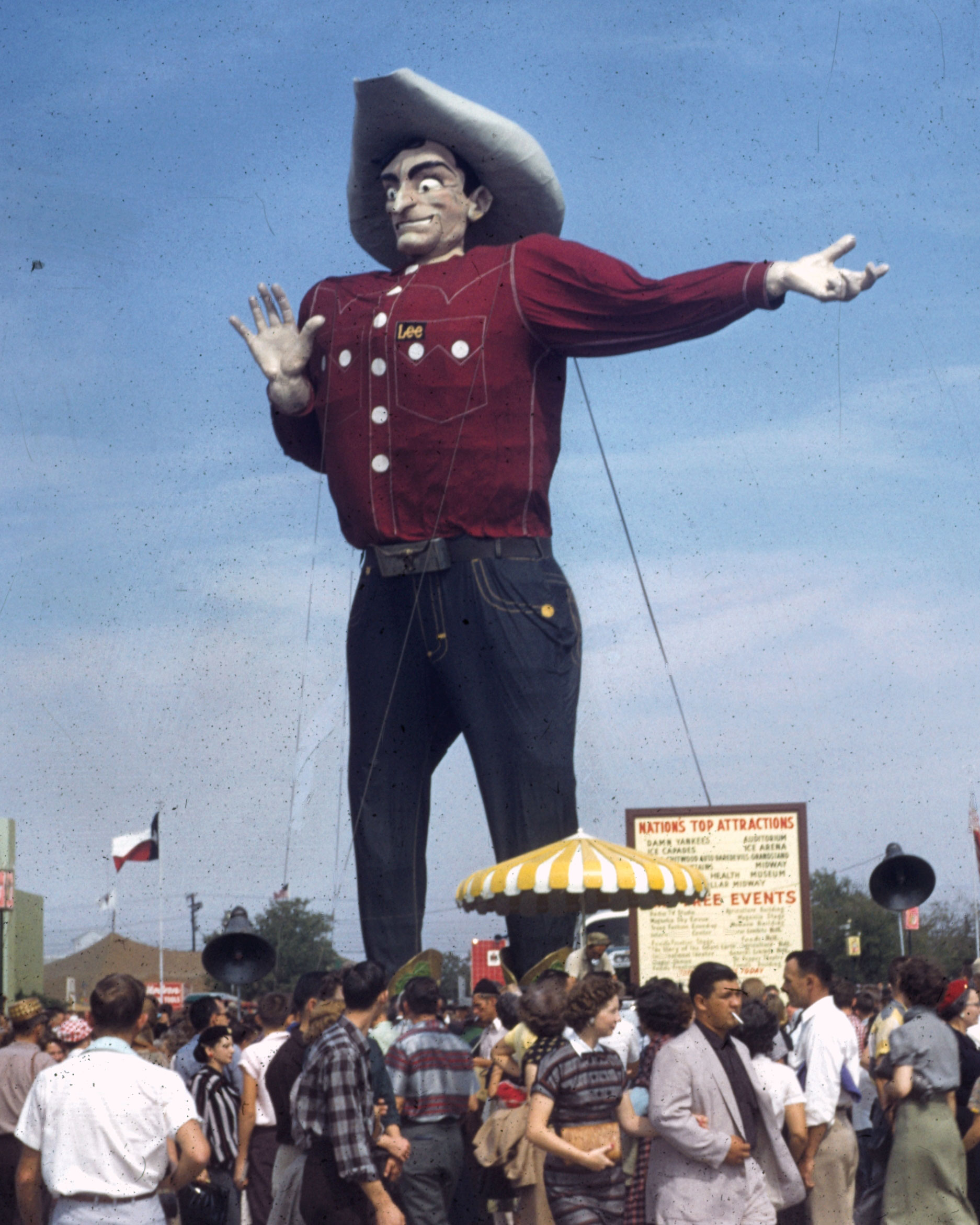
Big Tex, 1956

=== Origins ===
Kerens, Texas is known as the "Birthplace of Big Tex,” although his original incarnation was as a 49-foot (15 m) tall Santa Claus constructed from iron drill casing, papier mache, and unraveled rope in 1949. The statue was an idea of Howell Brister, manager of the Chamber of Commerce, to encourage holiday sales in the town, and the "World's Largest Santa Claus" (a claim later disputed) stood over Colket Avenue for two holiday seasons — drawing press attention from as far away as Iran and Australia. Modeled after Kerens residents Ottis Franklin Spurlock and Hardy Mayo, the figure was built by members of the community who welded the frame, fabricated the body and sewed the clothing.

After two seasons, the excitement over the statue faded, and Kerens offered it up for sale. In 1951, State Fair president R. L. Thornton purchased Santa's components for $750 and had artist Jack Bridges transform them into a cowboy, giving birth to "Big Tex.”

=== 1952 to 2012 ===
Big Tex, approximately a month before the fire that destroyed him

Big Tex made his debut at the 1952 fair, a 52-foot cowboy dressed in denim jeans and a plaid shirt donated by the H. D. Lee Company, then based in Shawnee Mission, Kansas. Artist Jack Bridges used a photograph of his own face, a photograph of rancher Doc Simmons and a photograph of Will Rogers to create the new look. After the fair, his appearance was slightly altered to straighten his nose and correct an odd wink. It was in 1953 that Big Tex also began speaking. Using a custom-built recipromotor and a 75-watt speaker system housed in the figure's head, Jack Bridges devised a way to create the illusion of natural speech with a swinging jaw. Tex also attended a convention in Minneapolis that year with the Dallas Jaycees.

In 1955, Big Tex received his first new change of clothes, again fabricated by the H. D. Lee Company. After that year's fair, he traveled to West Texas to participate in Abilene Christian College's 50th annual homecoming celebration. A 12-foot-tall, 19-foot long plastic model of a Hereford steer (called "The Champ") accompanied Big Tex for the 1956 fair, but Big Tex was primarily displayed alone. During the 1950s Big Tex underwent further re-design, replacing the papier mache "skin" with fiberglass. The original head was put into storage and later sold at auction in 1993 to a Dallas collector.

The State Fair of Texas announced the construction of a permanent, year-round statue of Big Tex in 1961, but the figure remained a seasonal feature appearing only during the fair. Instead, the Big Tex Circle display area was redesigned in 1966 with a larger mound.

Big Tex traveled to his hometown of Kerens, Texas in 1981 to help celebrate the 100th anniversary of the city. The figure continued to travel to various promotional events until the mid-1980s.

In 1997, Big Tex was given a skeletal makeover consisting of 4,200 feet of steel rods weighing 6,000 pounds. The new skeleton adjusted the posture and allowed for a new hand that waved to passersby, but kept the original head. Three years later his neck was animated, allowing it to turn; his mechanical mouth was also upgraded with a new system.

Big Tex celebrated his 50th birthday in 2002, receiving a giant birthday cake and an AARP card. Shades of gray were added to the hair and wrinkles were added to the figure's hands and face as Big Tex continued to "age.” In 2012, the State Fair of Texas celebrated Big Tex's 60th birthday.

== Destruction and recreation ==
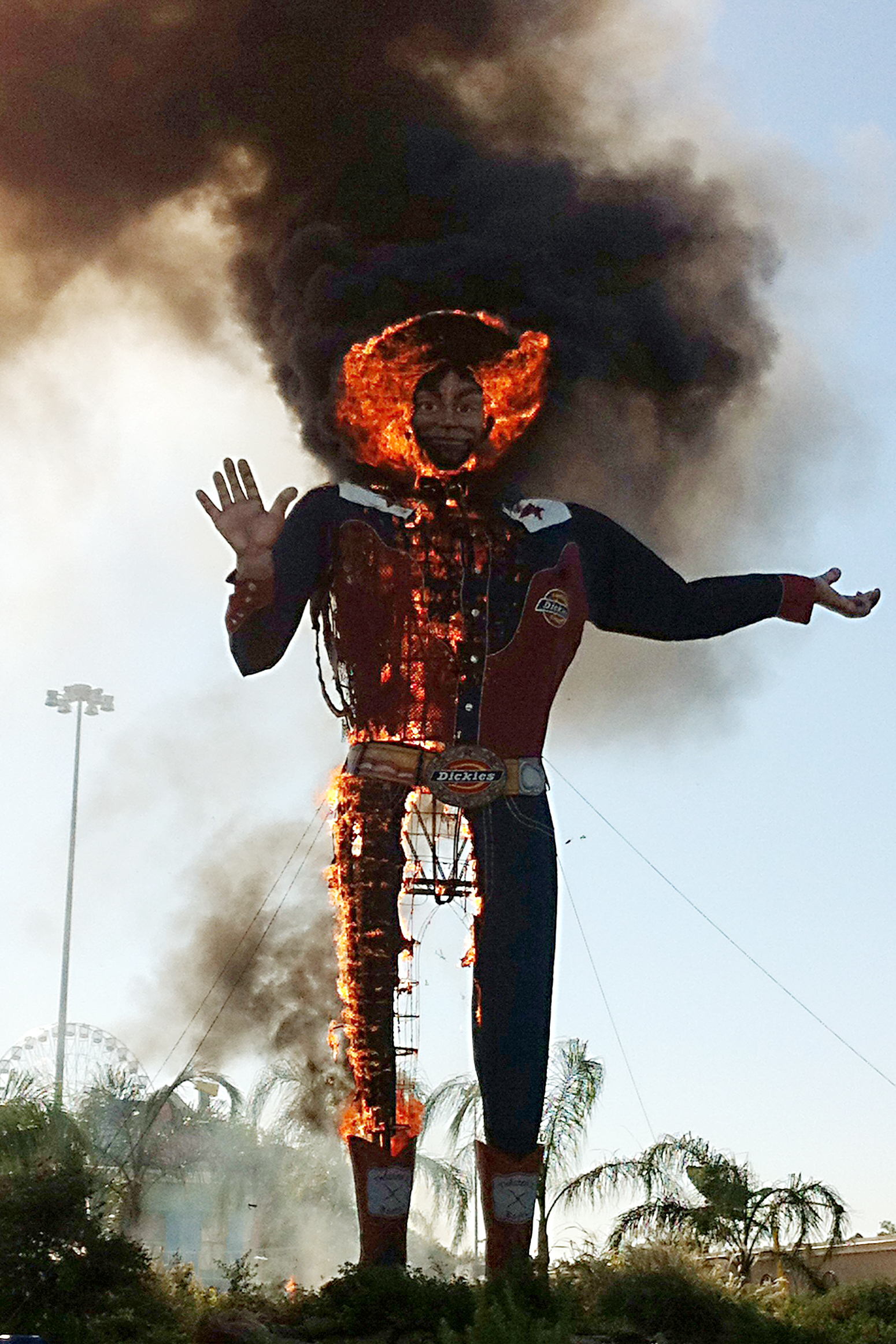
Big Tex as seen during the fire on October 19, 2012

On the morning of October 19, 2012, (the final weekend of the 2012 State Fair of Texas, and on Big Tex's 60th birthday) a fire started inside the framework of Big Tex. The figure's clothing, face and hat were completely destroyed in minutes as onlookers watched. An official investigation determined that the fire started in an electrical panel under the attraction's right boot. This panel was believed to have powered the air compressor that kept the clothing of the statue inflated.

News of the fire received national attention, and fair officials committed to rebuilding Big Tex "bigger and better" in time for the 2013 fair.

Working under secrecy, a new Big Tex was created during 2013 by SRO Associates and Texas Scenic Co. at a cost of $500,000. The recreated statue weighs 19,000 pounds (8,618.3 kg) more than the previous version, bringing him to 25,000 pounds (11,339.8 kg). This allows Big Tex to withstand 100 miles per hour (160.9 km/h) winds without needing support wires as in previous versions. The height was increased by 1 yard (91.4 cm) to 55 feet (16.8 m) tall. Big Tex Circle, the location during the State Fair of Texas, was also enlarged and reinforced for the larger statue.

== Clothing ==
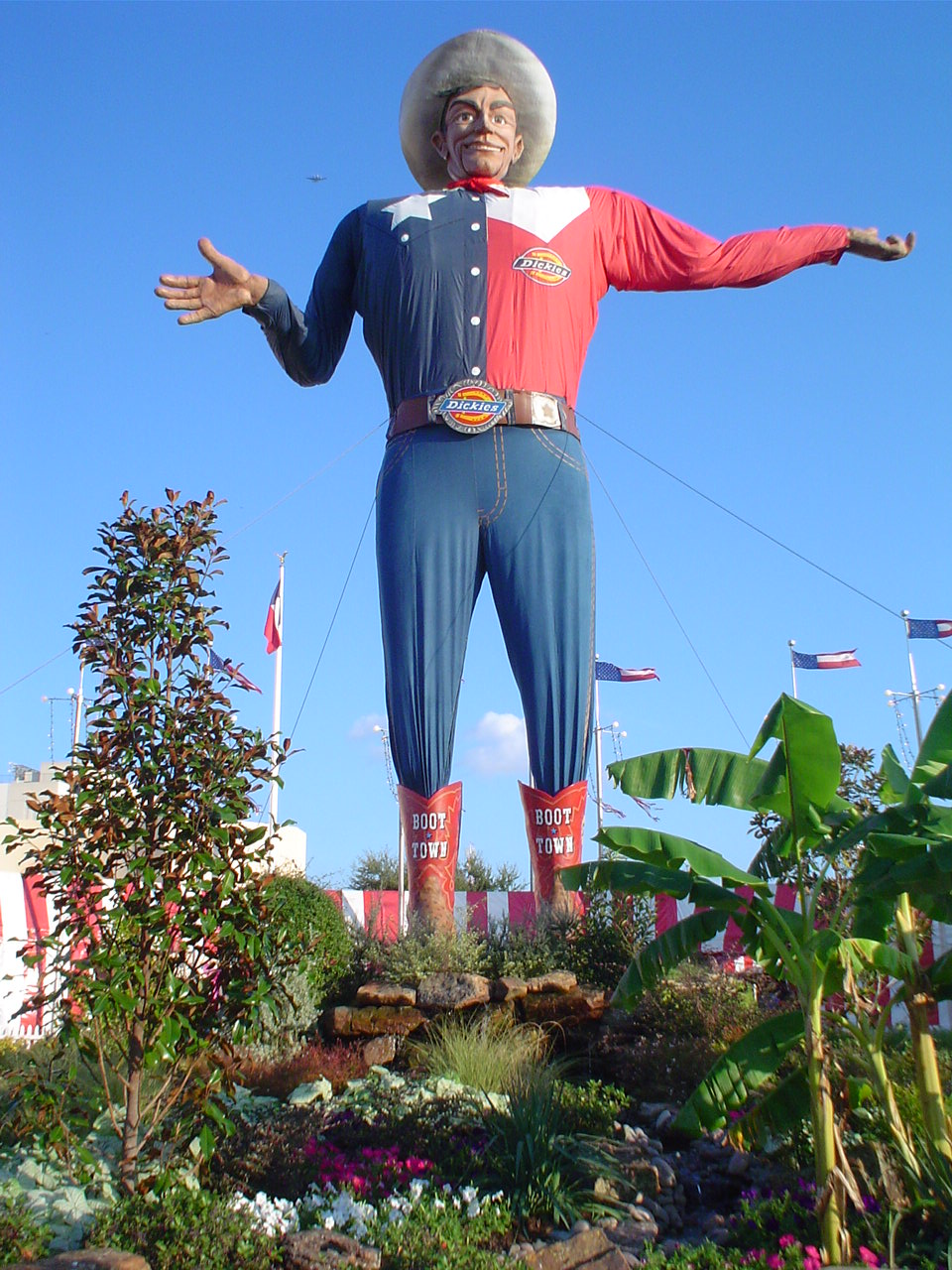
Big Tex, 8 October 2004

Big Tex will get a new look with a new shirt and cowboy hat with Cavender's Boot City and Resistol debuting in 2026 as a clothing partner for Big Tex. His clothes were last replaced in 2022 by the Williamson-Dickie Manufacturing Company (Former clothing partner of Big Tex).

Prior to 2013, Big Tex wore size 70 boots, a 75-gallon hat, a size 100 180/181 shirt made from nylon awning fabric and 284W/185L 5X pair of Dickies jeans. The pants alone required 72 yards (66 m) of denim and weigh in at 65 pounds (29 kg). Over the years the outfit was accessorized with other articles associated with that year's State Fair of Texas theme. Big Tex has suffered a few garment mishaps over the years. In 1961, Hurricane Carla's winds tore his clothes. In 1970, his huge shirt was stolen from a pickup truck and received much publicity.

The recreated structure for Big Tex that appeared in 2013 required new clothing and larger sizes. The new Dickie shirt features a 14-foot collar, 23-foot sleeves and weighs 130 pounds (59 kg). The shirt is made from 150 yards (140 m) of awning material. The new Dickie jeans features a 27-foot waist, 22-foot inseam and weighs 100 pounds (45 kg). The jeans are made from 100 yards (91 m) of denim material.

== Voices of Big Tex ==
Big Tex welcomes fairgoers with the greeting "Howdy, folks!" and makes regular announcements throughout the State Fair of Texas. His voice has been provided by several men over six decades, who perform each day of the fair from a booth known as the "doghouse."

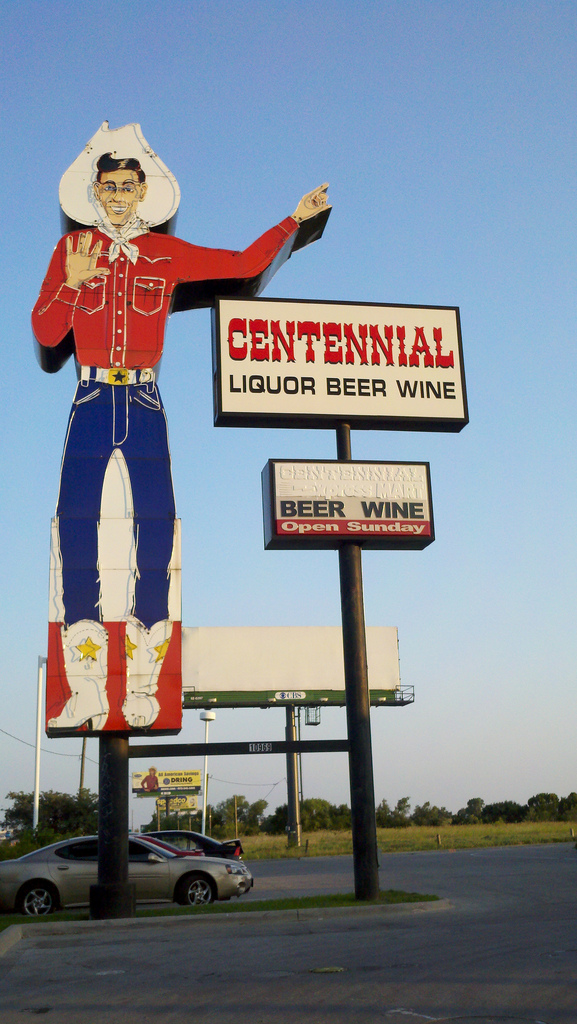
Centennial Liquor sign in Dallas, Texas, referencing Big Tex.

Al Jones, a disc jockey for WRR FM 101.1, was the first voice of Big Tex, and would fill the role until the fair ended in 1955. Radio announcer Jim Lowe, the most well-known voice of Big Tex, began performing his voice in 1956. He continued to provide his voice up until 1982 when he departed from the role for unknown reasons, in which Bob Sonnemaker stepped into the role for the next four years. Lowe would then resume voicing him again in 1987, he continued to provide his voice for eleven more years until his retirement after the 1998 State Fair, due to health issues.

After Lowe's retirement, Dan Alexander would step up for the next two years as Big Tex's voice, from 1999 to 2000. In 2001 a statewide competition and contest, held live at the Cotton Bowl, announced Sonny Ray Stolz as the next voice of Big Tex. But after only one season, Sonny decided not to continue due to what he considered unprofessional treatment by Fair officials and the Fair brought in runner-up Bill Bragg in 2002.

After the 2012 State Fair, Bragg was fired from the role after breaking the State Fair rules for revealing himself as the voice of Big Tex during a charity event, the Fair officially chose not to renew his contract. In 2013, Bob Boykin began voicing Big Tex, he would continue to voice him for a total of six years up until the 2019 State Fair. As of 2021, Big Tex has received a new voice performer, but the performer's name remains anonymously unknown at this time.

The voice of the 1955 Big Tex (Al Jones) can be heard on the recording of NBC's live Wide Wide World which includes multiple segments at the State Fair.

== Depictions ==
- The State Fair of Texas uses Big Tex in marketing material, including the fair's website domain name (www.bigtex.com).
- The 1962 film State Fair was shot on location at the State Fair of Texas, and features shots of Big Tex and the fairgrounds.
- Big Tex is featured on the cover of the 1983 comic "The Uncanny X-Men at the State Fair of Texas".
- In an episode of the FOX-TV animated series of King of the Hill, Big Tex is the focus of the episode "Girl, You'll Be a Giant Soon" which first aired April 25, 2004. In the episode, Hank Hill is upset that the State Fair of Texas will not allow propane grills to be used. Luanne Platter, Hill's niece, decides to protest this by climbing inside Big Tex and staging a sit-in protest.
- Big Tex makes another appearance in King of the Hill in the episode "How to Fire a Rifle Without Really Trying", but he just says "Howdy."
- Big Tex appears in the King of the Hill revival series in the episode "Reality Bites", and has his hand damaged by cannon fire
- In 2005, the State Fair of Texas created the Big Tex Choice Awards, an annual food competition between vendors of the fair. The trophy merges the Academy Award's Oscar body with an oversized Big Tex head.
- The name and logo for local/underground record label Burning Texan Records was inspired by the 2012 fire.
- The album cover for Horror Cult's The Texorcist depicts Big Tex on fire.
- The image of Big Tex and the statue's iconic stance is commonly used in regional advertising campaigns.
- Big Tex's image was featured prominently on a tour promotion poster for the Japanese J-Pop group "Puffy AmiYumi" on their US three-city April 2017 "Not Lazy Concert Tour" in which finished in Dallas.
- Dallas band Tripping Daisy wrote "Jim's Longtime Voice" in 1998 as a tribute to Jim Lowe after reading of his retirement.
- A different cowboy statue in Conlen, Texas was nicknamed "Big Tex". It was erected in 1954 as part of a restaurant and steakhouse.
- The episode "All's Fair in Love and War" of the animated series Jentry Chau vs. the Underworld sees the titular character attending the state fair, with Big Tex featured. A fight with the bounty hunter Solar Tang results in the statue being brought to life and going on a rampage, and Jentry has to destroy it with her fire powers to stop it, having to go inside it to do so due to the fireproofing applied after the original statue's destruction.
