= Sisters of '77 =

- Directed by: Cynthia Salzman Mondell; Allen Mondell
- Starring: Liz Carpenter; Betty Friedan; Ann Richards; Gloria Steinem
- Theme music composer: Tim Cissell
- Country of origin: United States
- Original language: English

Production
- Producers: Cynthia Salzman Mondell; Allen Mondell
- Running time: 55 minutes

Original release
- Network: PBS
- Release: March 1, 2005

Sisters of '77 is a documentary film that chronicles the 1977 National Women's Conference in Houston, Texas, which took place November 18–21, 1977. The goal of the National Women's Conference was to end discrimination against women and promote their equal rights. The conference was sponsored by President Gerald Ford's Executive Order 11832 and federally funded through HR 9924. It brought together over 20,000 women and men from around the United States.

Sisters of '77 provides a look at a pivotal weekend that changed the course of history and the lives of the women who attended. The film incorporates rare archival footage and interviews of leaders relating this history to the present. Former first ladies Lady Bird Johnson, Betty Ford, and Rosalynn Carter were notable conference participants, and many influential women leaders attended, including Bella Abzug, Betty Friedan, Gloria Steinem, Eleanor Smeal, Ann Richards, Coretta Scott King, Billie Jean King, and Barbara Jordan. The attendees included a wide range of women, such as Republicans, Democrats, African Americans, Asian Americans, Latinas, Native American, pro-choice, pro-life, straight, gay, liberal and conservative women.

== Production ==
Sisters of '77 was created by filmmakers Cynthia Salzman Mondell and Allen Mondell and executive produced by Ed Delaney and Circle R Media, in association with Media Projects Inc. Salzman Mondell participated in the 1977 conference as a relay runner helping to carry a torch from Seneca Falls, New York, the site of the first women's rights convention in the United States, to Houston for the 1977 National Women's Conference. The film incorporates actual footage of the conference and modern-day interviews with movement leaders and women who attended.

== Education and Outreach ==
ITVS chose the documentary Sisters of '77 for their Community Connections Project (CCP), a community engagement and educational outreach campaign which reaches out to organizations that invest in building young women leaders; university and high school students who participate in gender studies, political science, history and social studies; organizations that promote women's equal rights, reproductive freedom, lesbian and minority rights; and Internet groups that focus on democracy in action, social change and human rights.
