= Hoffman (disambiguation) =

Hoffman is a German or Jewish surname or given name.

Hoffman, Hofmann or Hoffmann may also refer to:

== Places ==
=== Australia ===
- Hoffman, Western Australia, a rural locality in the South West region

=== United States ===
- Hoffman, Illinois (village)
- Hoffman Estates, Illinois (village)
- Hoffman, Minnesota (city)
- Hoffman, Missouri, an unincorporated community
- Hoffman, New Jersey (unincorporated community)
- Hoffmans, New Jersey (unincorporated community)
- Hoffman, North Carolina (town)
- Hoffman, Oklahoma (town)
- Hoffman Island, near Staten Island, New York
- Hoffman, settlement in the Virgin Islands

== Animals ==
- Hoffmann's two-toed sloth, a species of sloth from Central and South America
- Hoffmann's woodpecker, a resident breeding bird from southern Honduras south to Costa Rica
- Hoffmanns's woodcreeper, a species of bird in the Dendrocolaptinae subfamily
- Hoffmann's pika, a species of mammal in the family Ochotonidae
- Hoffmann's rat, a species of rodent in the family Muridae

== Artistic works ==
- Hoffman (film), 1970 drama film by Alvin Rakoff starring Peter Sellers
- The Tales of Hoffmann, 1881 opera by Jacques Offenbach
- The Tales of Hoffmann (film), 1951 film
- "Lost Keys" (Blame Hofmann), song by Tool
- The Tragedy of Hoffmann, or a Revenge for a Father (played 1602; printed 1631) by Henry Chettle
- Hoffman, a fictional character in the 2023 Indian film Tiger 3

== Other ==
- Arthur and Mona Hofmann House, historical home designed by Richard Neutra in Hillsborough, California.
- Hoffman Television, a manufacturer of television sets in the 1950s and 1960s
- Hoffman (Cleveland automobile)
- Hoffman (Detroit automobile)
- Hoffmann (German automobile)
- Hoffmann (motorcycle), a former German bicycle and motorcycle manufacturer
- Hoffmann–La Roche, a Swiss pharmaceutical company
- Hoffman Building (disambiguation)
- Hoffmann's anodyne, a drug used as a painkiller or hypnotic
- Hoffmann's sign, a reflex in the hand
- Hofmann elimination, a process where an amine is reacted to create a tertiary amine and an alkene
- Hofmann GmbH, a German producer of road marking technology
- Hofmann rearrangement, the organic reaction of a primary amide to a primary amine with one fewer carbon atom
- Hofmann (restaurant), a Michelin starred restaurant in Barcelona, Spain
- The Hoffman Agency, a global high-tech public relations firm
- Hofmann voltameter, a piece of chemistry apparatus sometimes used to collect hydrogen and oxygen gas created in the electrolysis of water

== See also ==
- Huffman (disambiguation)
