= Prien Building =

- U.S. National Register of Historic Places
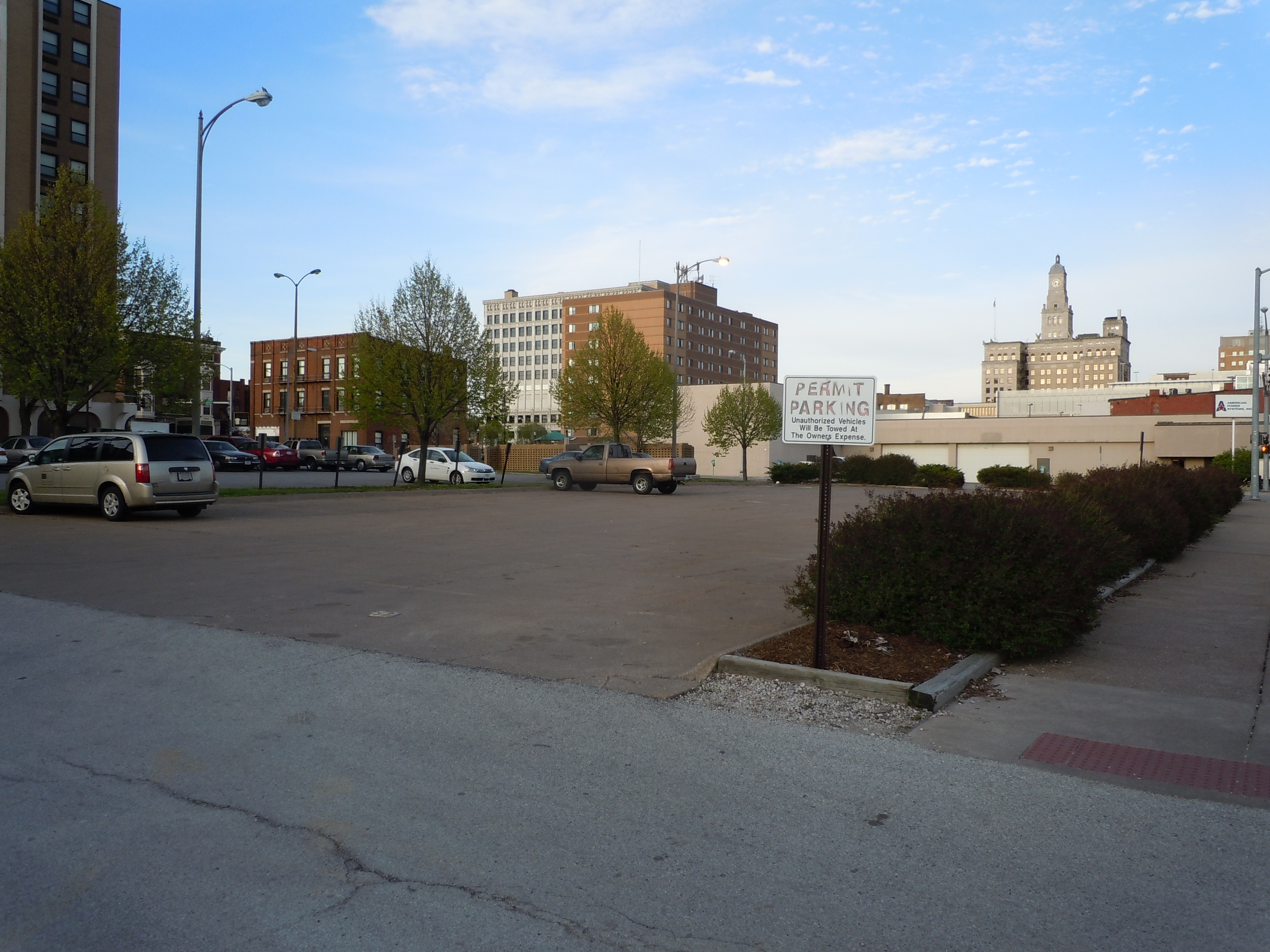
- Location of where the Prien Building stood

- Location within Iowa Location within the United States
- Location: 506-508 W. 2nd St. Davenport, Iowa
- Coordinates: 41°31′17″N 90°34′50″W
- Area: less than one acre
- Built: 1855
- Architectural style: Greek Revival
- Demolished: 1988
- MPS: Davenport MRA
- NRHP reference No.: 83002488
- Added to NRHP: July 7, 1983

The Prien Building was a historic building located in downtown Davenport, Iowa, United States. It was listed on the National Register of Historic Places in 1983. Like the Hoffman Building next door, Mueller Lumber Company across the street and the Riepe Drug Store/G. Ott Block on the 400 block of Second Street, it was torn down in the late 20th century.

== History ==
Fred J. Prien operated a grocery and provision store in this building in 1874. He operated a saloon at this location by 1880. Prien lived in an apartment above the shop.

The building, along with the Venus News building nearby, was demolished in 1988.

== Architecture ==
The building was completed in 1855 in the Greek Revival style. It was a three-story brick structure that featured a prefabricated iron shop-front. The iron front was able to support the brick structure above it and it opened large areas of glass on the first floor so the shop could display its wares in the window. The Prien building had a double-wide shop-front with a door in between them that led to the apartments above. There was a cornice molding across the top of the façade.
