= Huffman =

Huffman may refer to:

== Places ==
=== United States ===
- Huffman, Indiana, an unincorporated community
- Huffman, Texas, an unincorporated community
- Huffman, West Virginia, an unincorporated community

=== Antarctica ===
- Mount Huffman, Ellsworth Land

== People ==
- Huffman (surname), a surname
- Huffman Eja-Tabe (born 1981), Cameroonian footballer in North America

== Other uses ==
- Huffman Brothers Motor Company, 1920s Indiana-based car company'
- Huffman High School, Birmingham, Alabama
- Huffman Manufacturing Company, former name of the Huffy Corporation, a bicycle manufacturer based in Dayton, Ohio
- Mount Huffman (Texas), a mountain in Big Bend National Park, USA

== See also ==
- Huffman coding, a data compression algorithm (Huffman tree) by David A. Huffman
- Huffman Dam, near Fairborn, Ohio
- Huffman Historic District, Dayton, Ohio, on the National Register of Historic Places
- Huffman Prairie, Ohio, also known as Huffman Field, a field used by the Wright brothers for testing and training
- Hoffman (disambiguation)
