= Hoffman Building (Davenport) =

- U.S. National Register of Historic Places
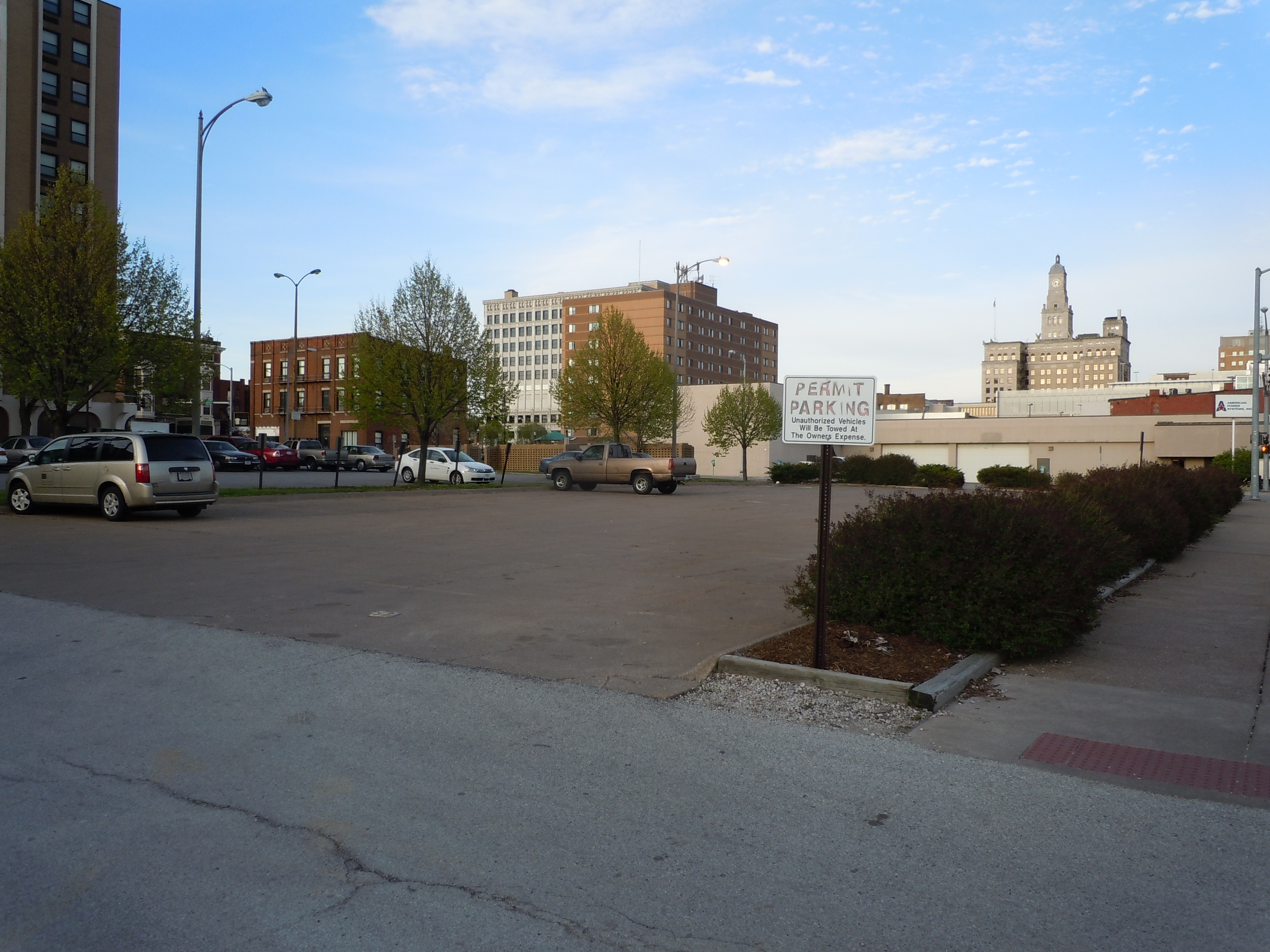
- Location of where the Hoffman Building stood

- Location within Iowa Location within the United States
- Location: 510 W. 2nd St. Davenport, Iowa
- Coordinates: 41°31′18″N 90°34′50″W
- Area: less than one acre
- Built: c.1855
- Architectural style: Greek Revival
- MPS: Davenport MRA
- NRHP reference No.: 83002447
- Added to NRHP: July 7, 1983

The Hoffman Building was a historic building erected circa 1855 located in downtown Davenport, Iowa, United States. John V. Hoffman operated a grocery store in the shop on the first floor. He lived in the apartment on the second floor. The building was typical of Davenport's early commercial architecture with a steep-pitched side-gable roof. It featured a well-preserved cast-iron shop front. In its early days a long shed roof extended from the building and was supported by posts along the curb to shelter the sidewalk. It and was listed on the National Register of Historic Places in 1983. Like the Prien Building next door, Mueller Lumber Company across the street and the Riepe Drug Store/G. Ott Block on the 400 block of Second Street, it was torn down in the late 20th century.
