= Hoffman Building =

Hoffman Building may refer to:

- Hoffman Building (Los Angeles), California
- Hoffman Building (Davenport), Iowa
- Hofmann Building, Ottumwa, Iowa
- Hoffman Building (Morristown), New Jersey
