= Hoffmans =

Hoffmans may refer to:

- Hoffmans, New Jersey, an unincorporated community in Hunterdon County, New Jersey, United States
- Hoffmans, New York, a hamlet in Schenectady County, New York, United States

== See also ==
- Hoffman (disambiguation)
