= Hoffman (Detroit automobile) =

Defunct American motor vehicle manufacturer

The Hoffman had two prototype vehicles built by the R.C. Hoffman company of Detroit, Michigan in 1931. They were front-drive vehicles, powered by Lycoming straight-8 engines. The wheels were carried on solid load-bearing axles. Semi-elliptical springs were equipped on the front end, along with torque arms.
