= Mount Huffman (Texas) =

Mountain in Texas, United States

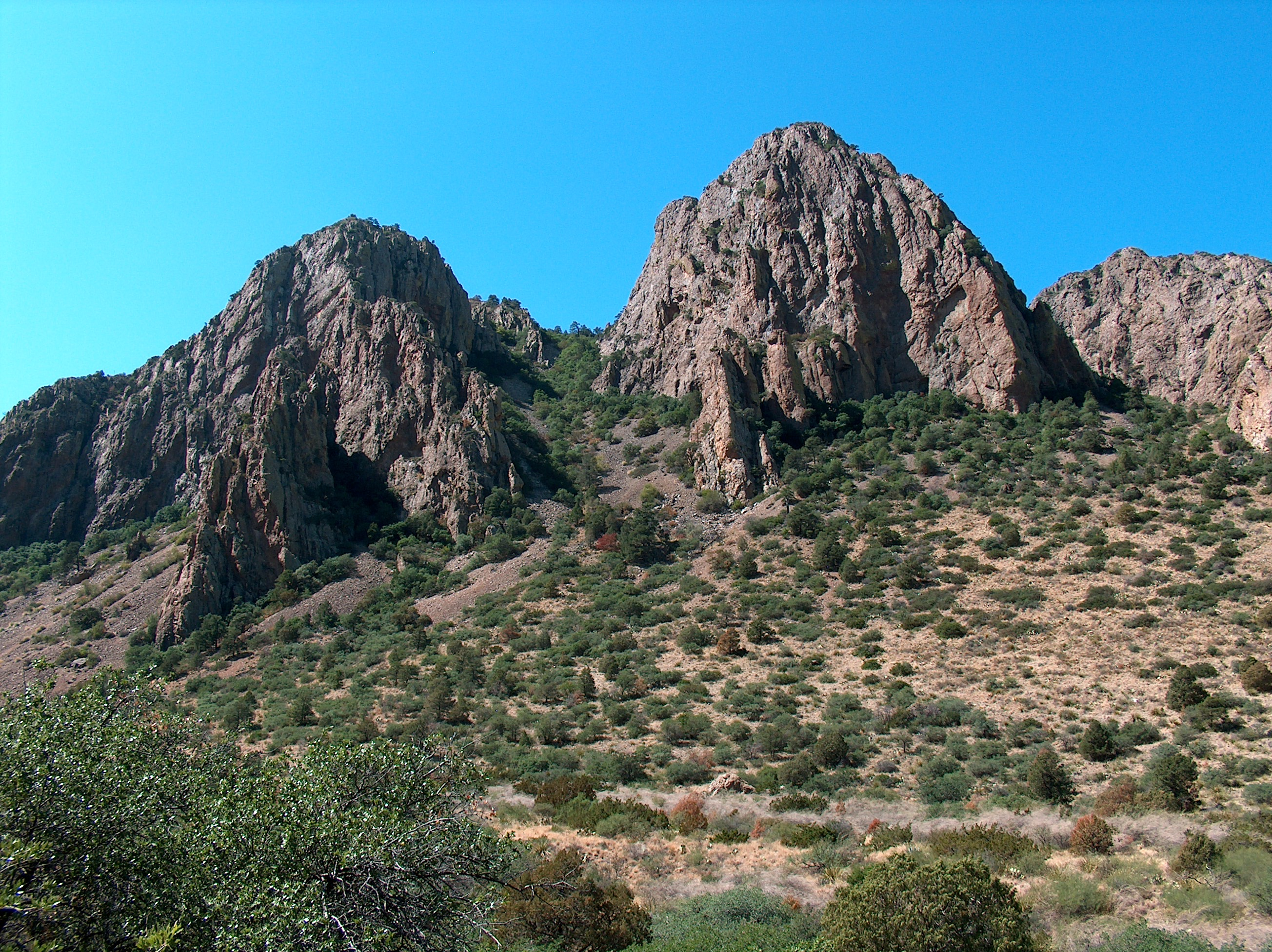
- Northeast aspect

Highest point
- Elevation: 6,373 ft (1,942 m)
- Prominence: 424 ft (129 m)
- Isolation: 0.50 mi (0.80 km)
- Coordinates: 29°16′51″N 103°17′21″W

Naming
- Etymology: Calvin C. Huffman

Geography
- Location within Texas Location within the United States
- Country: United States
- State: Texas
- County: Brewster
- Protected area: Big Bend National Park
- Parent range: Chisos Mountains
- Topo map: USGS The Basin

Geology
- Rock age: Oligocene
- Rock type: Intrusive rock

Climbing
- Easiest route: class 2

Mount Huffman is a 6,373-foot-elevation (1,942-meter) summit in Brewster County, Texas, United States.

== Description ==
Mount Huffman is located in the Chisos Mountains and it ranks as the 16th-highest peak in Big Bend National Park. The mountain is composed of intrusive rock which formed during the Oligocene period. Topographic relief is modest as the summit rises 1,375 feet (419 m) above The Basin in 0.75 miles (1.21 km). Based on the Köppen climate classification, Mount Huffman is located in a hot arid climate zone with hot summers and mild winters. Any scant precipitation runoff from the mountain's slopes drains southwest into Oak Creek and northeast into Green Gulch which are both part of the Rio Grande watershed. The lower slopes of the peak are covered by juniper, oak, and piñon. The mountain's toponym was officially adopted in 1994 by the United States Board on Geographic Names to remember Calvin C. Huffman (1907–1980), legislator from Texas who, in 1941, introduced a bill to provide funds for acquisition of land to create Big Bend National Park.

== See also ==
- List of mountain peaks of Texas
- Geography of Texas

== Gallery ==
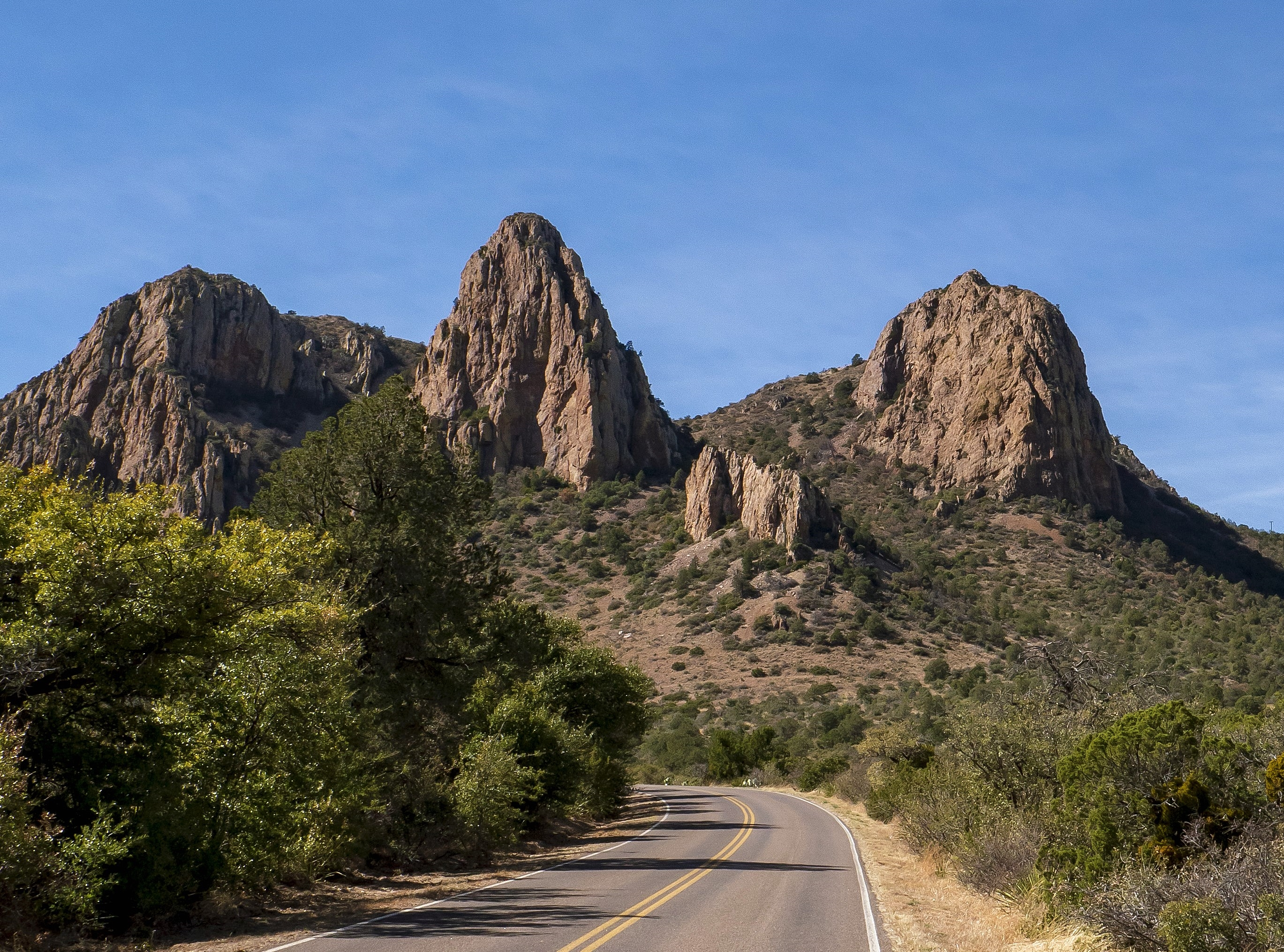
Northeast aspect

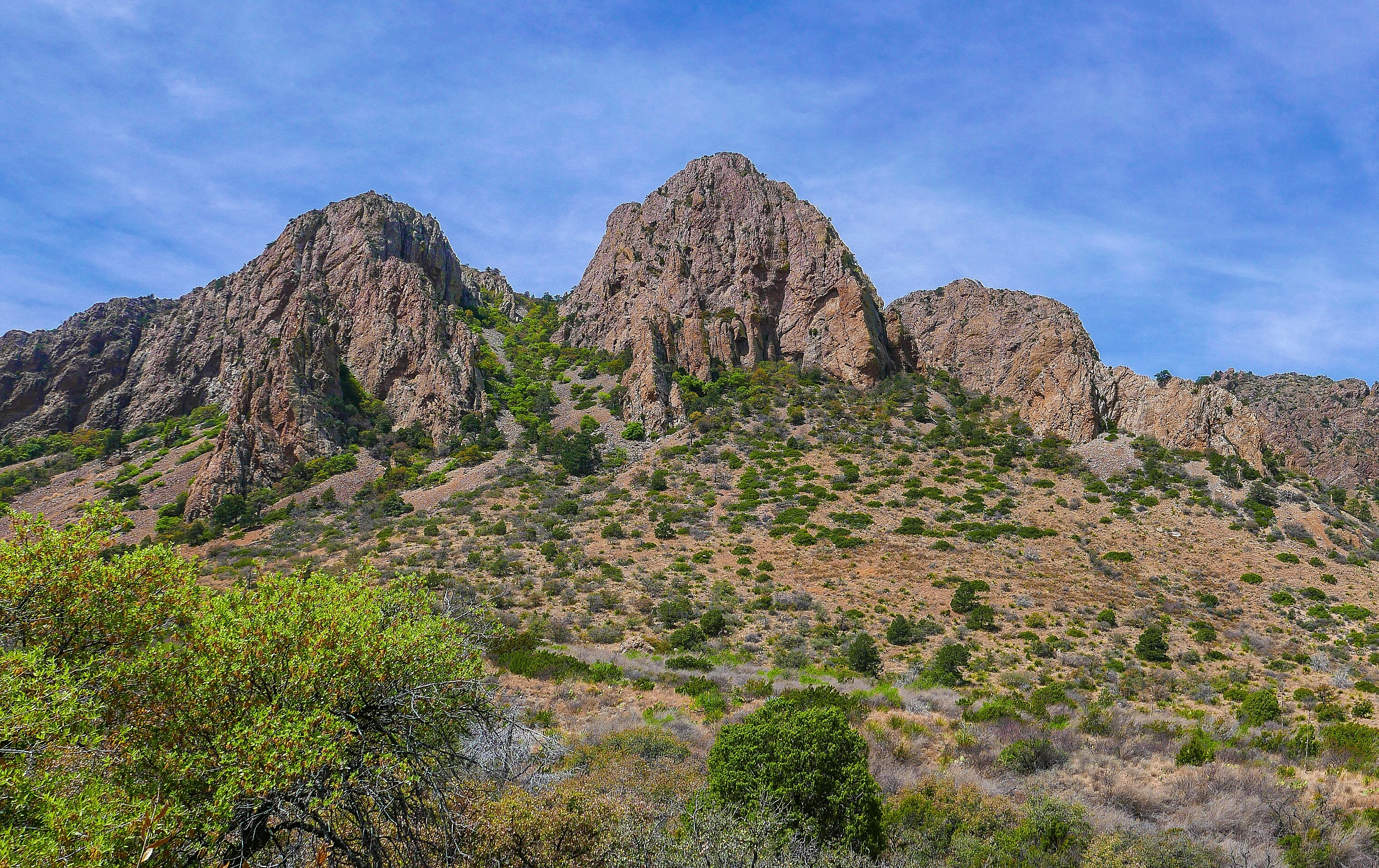
Northeast aspect

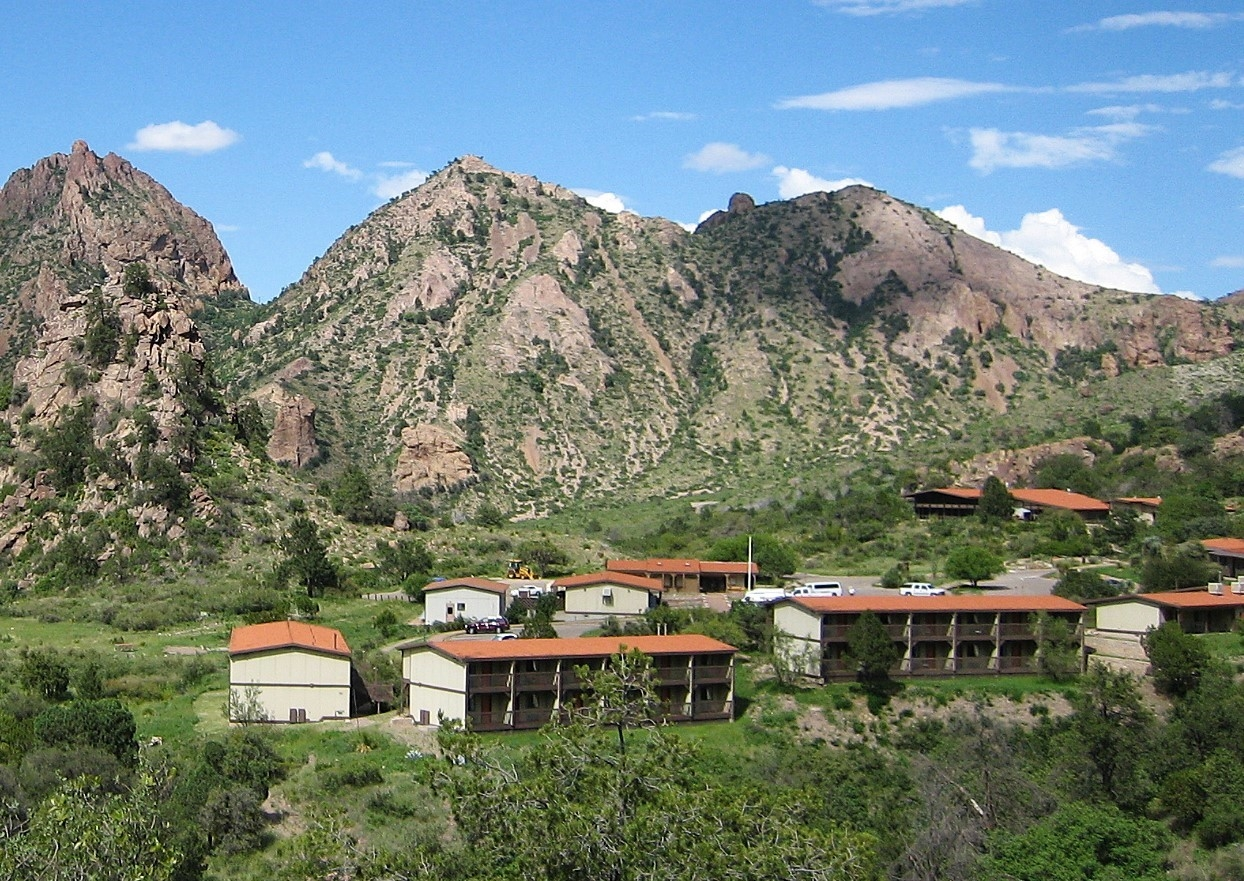
Southwest aspect of Mount Huffman and Chisos Mountain Lodge

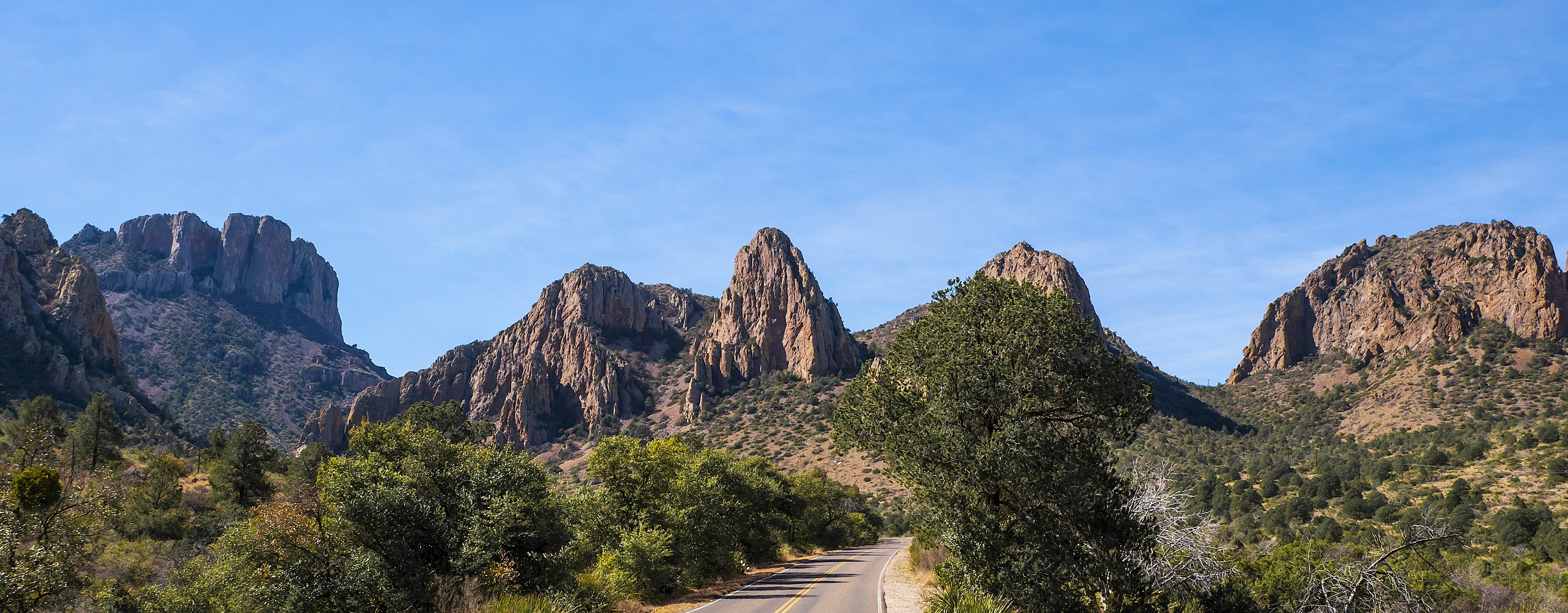
Mount Huffman centered, Casa Grande Peak (left)

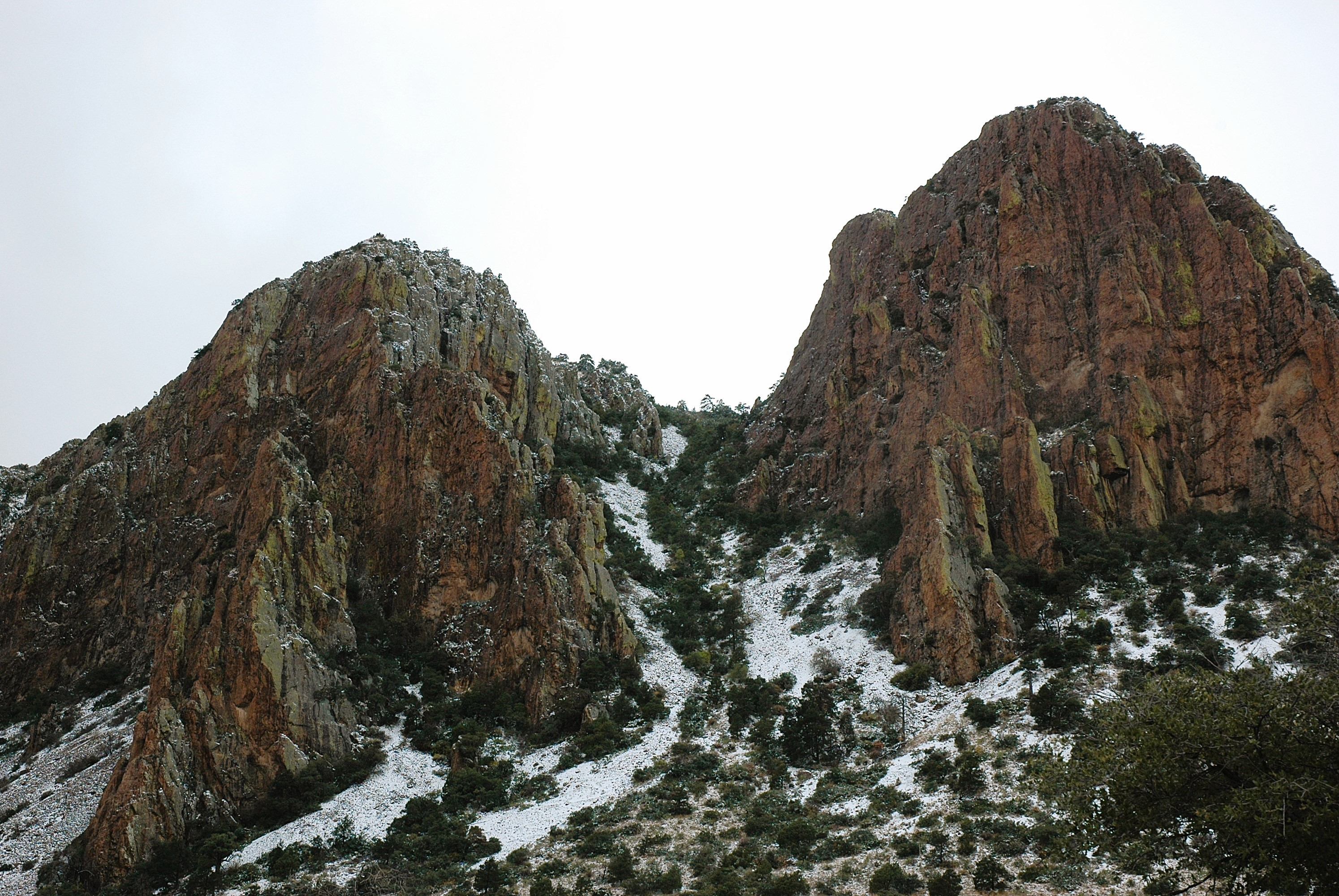
Northeast aspect with dusting of snow
