= Hoffman, U.S. Virgin Islands =

Settlement on the island of Saint Thomas

Coordinates: 18°20′01″N 64°53′42″W

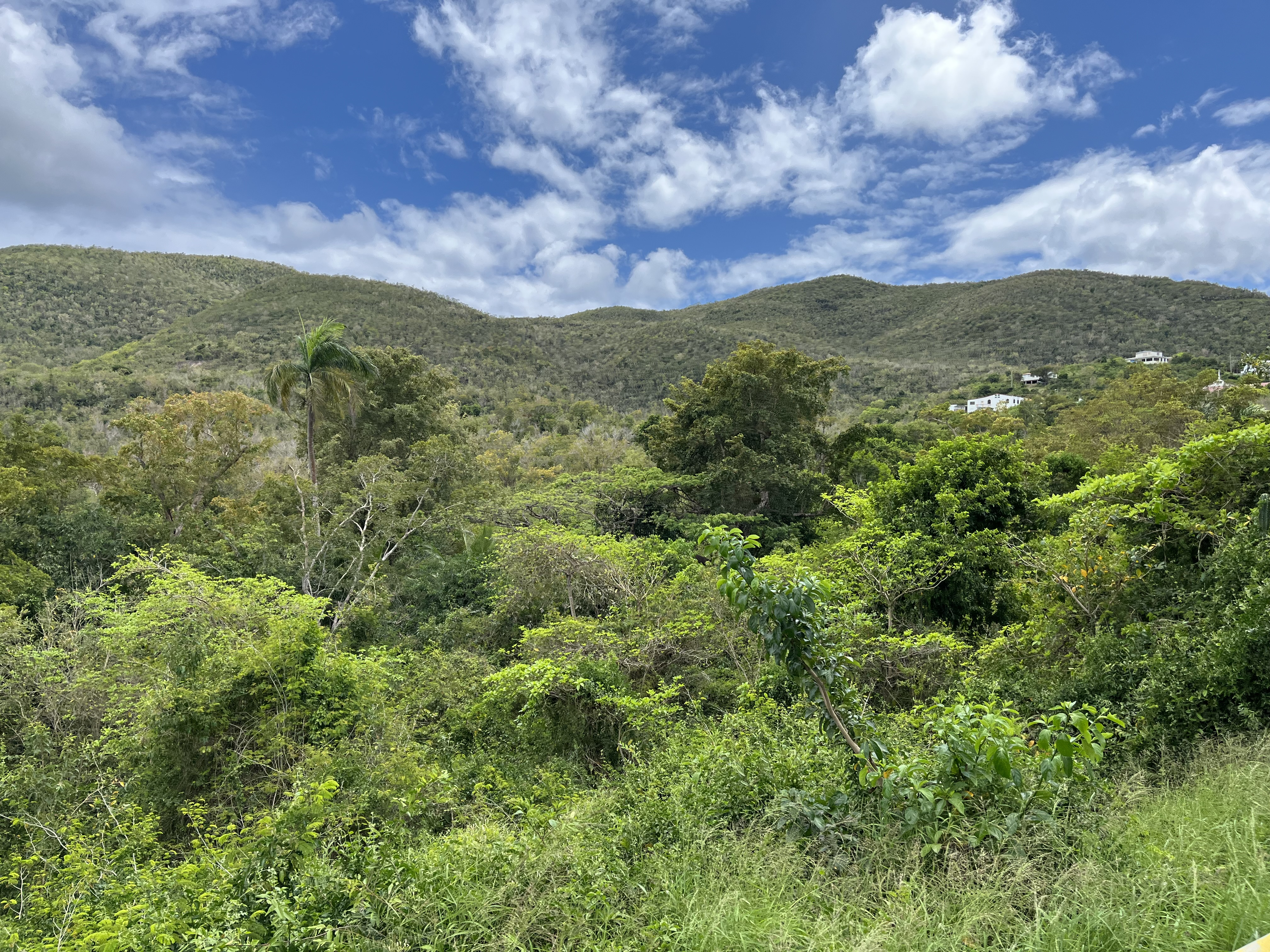
Hoffman

Hoffman is a settlement on the island of Saint Thomas in the United States Virgin Islands.
