= Huffman, West Virginia =

Huffman
- Unincorporated community
- Location within the state of West Virginia Huffman (the United States)
- Coordinates: 39°4′5″N 79°55′2″W
- Country: United States
- State: West Virginia
- County: Barbour
- Elevation: 1,686 ft (514 m)
- Time zone: UTC-5 (Eastern (EST))
  - Summer (DST): UTC-4 (EDT)
- GNIS ID: 1697079

Huffman was an unincorporated community in Barbour County, West Virginia, United States.
