= Hofmann GmbH =

German company

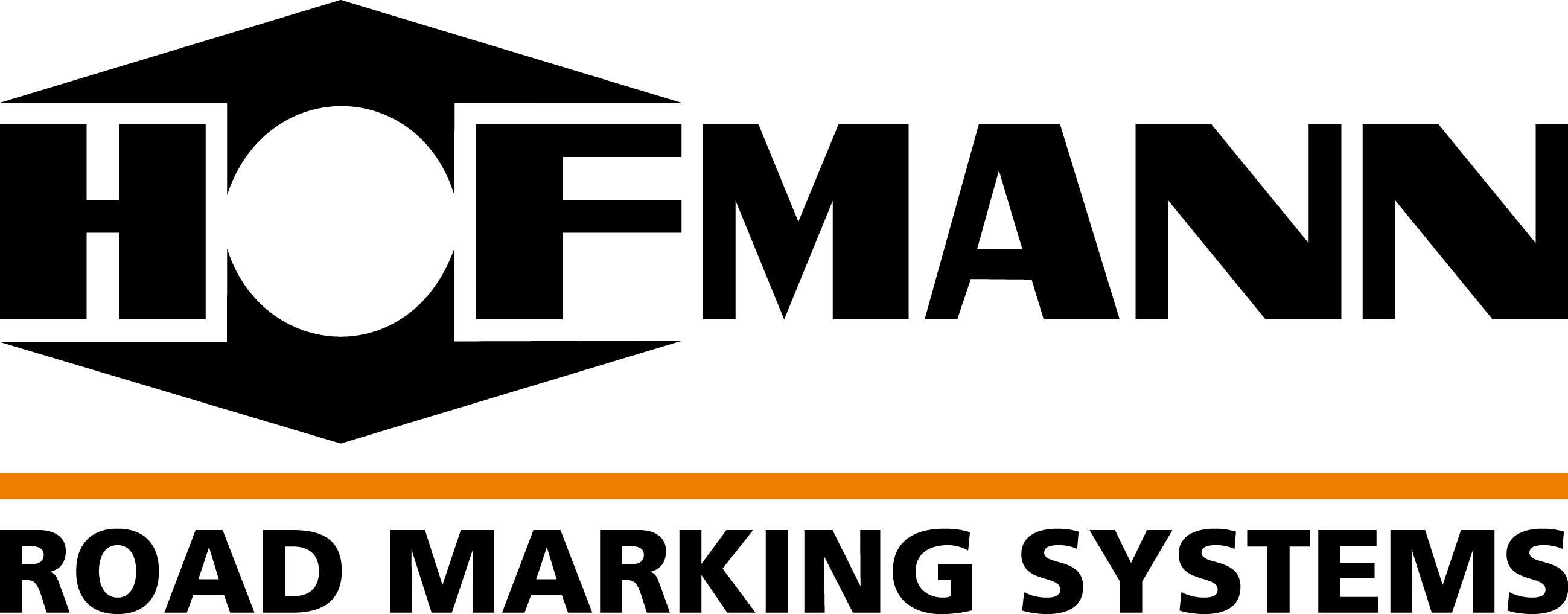
- Company type: GmbH
- Industry: Mechanical engineering and vehicle engineering
- Founded: 1952 in Egenbüttel, Schleswig-Holstein, Germany
- Founder: Walter Hofmann
- Headquarters: Rellingen, Germany
- Key people: Frank Hofmann and Jan Philipp Hofmann
- Products: Roadway marking machines and complementary products
- Number of employees: 100 (2015)
- Website: hofmannmarking.de/en/

Hofmann GmbH Maschinenfabrik und Vertrieb (abbreviated: HOFMANN GmbH) is a family-owned German company, based in Rellingen. That develops, produces and distributes road marking machines. The company was founded in 1952 in Hamburg.

== History ==
Walter Hofmann (1907–1999), the company's founder, began by designing and constructing Agricultural machinery, in 1962 Hofmann purchased property in Egenbüttel (now Rellingen). The company moved three years later.

In 1955 the company introduced its first special machine to the market: the Rolling disk marker unit. It has since developed quite varied machines, components and systems that differ in their dimensions, drives, application systems, environmental compatibilities, functions and technical performance data. In this context the company applied for a number of patents in painting and spraying technology. Moreover, it repeatedly expanded the Company grounds.

In 1982 the registered merchant enterprise became Walter Hofmann GmbH. In 1992 the founder quit his job as managing director of the company, and his son Frank Hofmann took over.

In 1990 the Rellingen company acquired the Quickborn-based company S+S Gesellschaft für Sicherheit auf Straßen m. b. H. Herstellung und Vertrieb von Straßenmarkiermaschinen, which is also active in the road marking technology. Twelve years later the two companies merged completely, ever since (2002) the company acts as Hofmann GmbH. At the beginning of 2008, Jan Philipp Hofmann, grandson of the company founder, entered the management.

The first decade of the 21st century was characterized by a pronounced growth. Thus the number of employees increased from 67 (end of 2000) to 100 (mid-2011).

In March 2009, the VDI nachrichten listed the company 37th of the fastest-growing small and medium-sized enterprises in Germany.

In 2012 the company developed the first line width stabilizer. In road-dependent airless-spraying, it automatically keeps the line width variance within narrow limits.

== The present ==
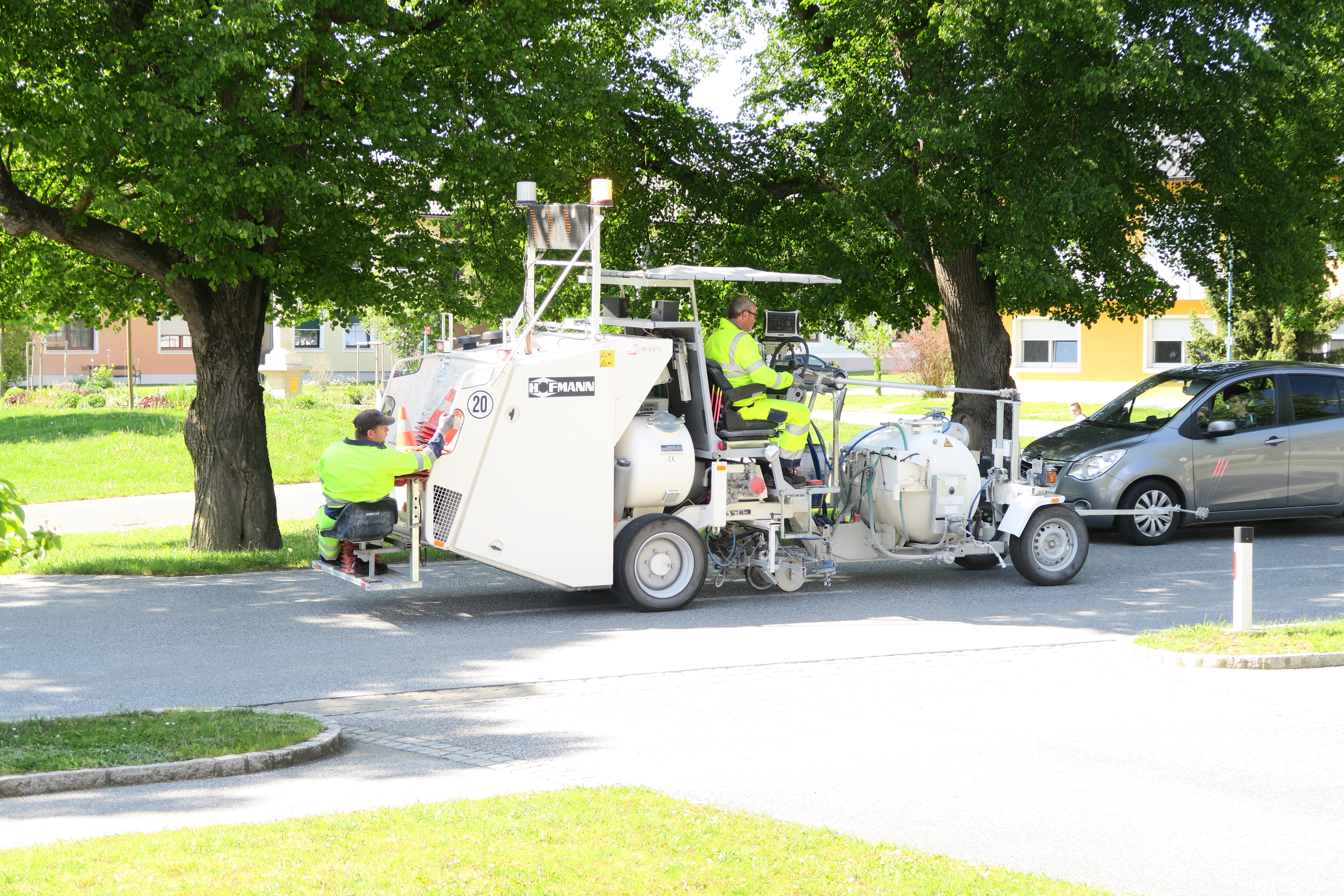
Street marking machine from Hofmann (Model H26-4), May 2017

Products from the company are distributed worldwide in 132 countries (2011). The company supports its global Sales and Service with a network of more than 60 partners and extended partners. The export share of the turnover is about 90 per cent.

The machines are predominantly used for marking public roads as well as airports (apron and runways). They are also occasionally used on company premises and stadiums. In its special market segment with about a dozen suppliers, the Rellingen supplier is considered the market leader.

The company portfolio includes roadway marking machines from manually operated devices via ride-on machines in the mini tractor format to trucks with special bodywork. Also offered are special accessories and equipment such as drying machines, demarking machines, trailers or line graduation electronics, moreover cookers for the material to be applied. The form, material, width and pattern of the applications are varied.

Since 2001, the Hofmann GmbH regularly organizes technology days on its Rellingen premises. This event is considered an in-house and trade fair for an audience consisting of representatives from manufacturers, suppliers, associations, authorities, customers and scientists.
