= Hofmann Building =

- U.S. National Register of Historic Places
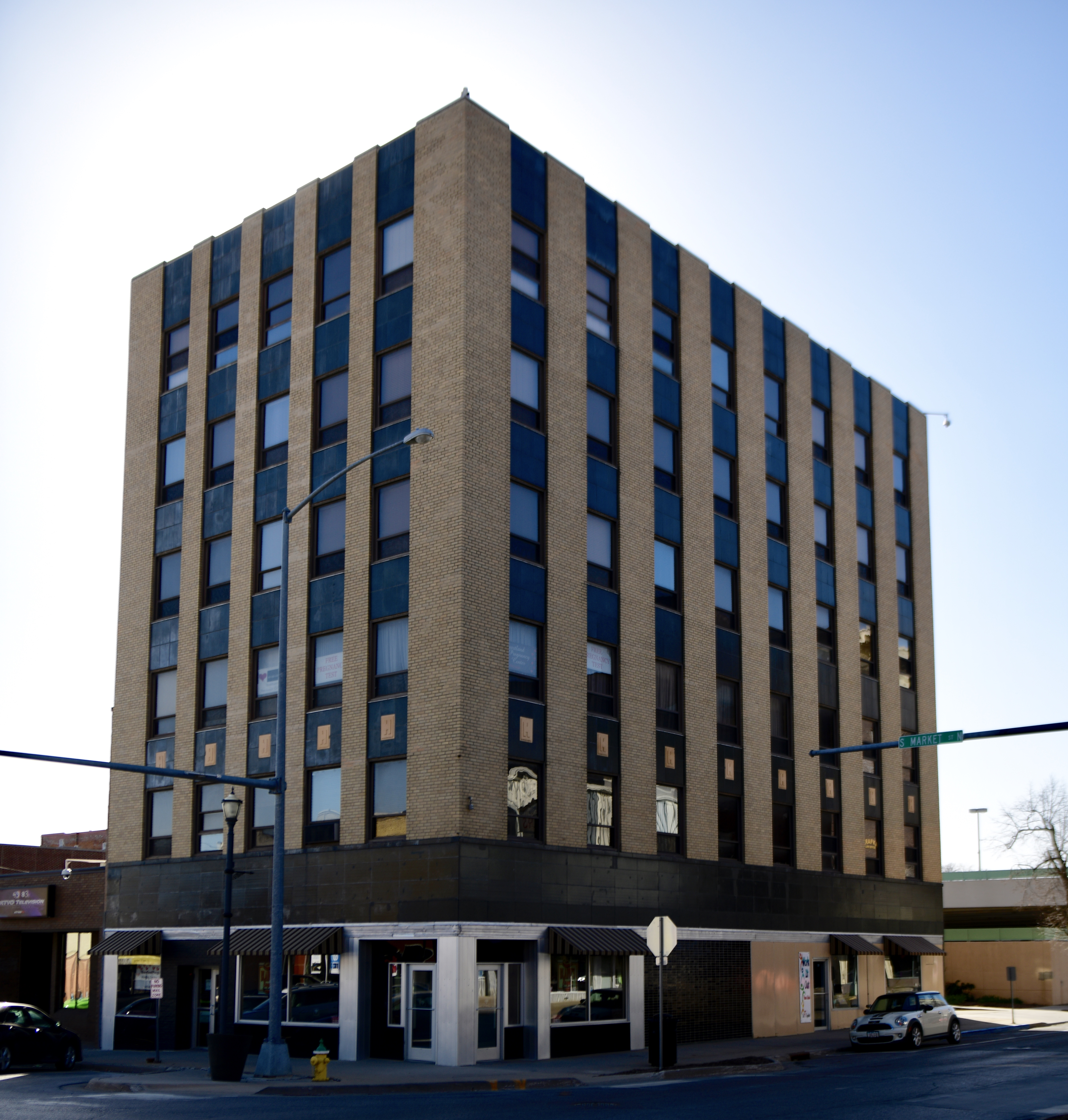

- Location within Iowa Location within the United States
- Location: 101 S. Market St. Ottumwa, Iowa
- Coordinates: 41°1′7″N 92°24′43″W
- Area: less than one acre
- Built: 1941
- Built by: The Weitz Company, Inc.
- Architect: Proudfoot, Rawson, Brooks & Borg
- Architectural style: Modern Movement
- MPS: Ottumwa MPS
- NRHP reference No.: 10001085
- Added to NRHP: December 27, 2010

The Hofmann Building, also known as the Harvester Building, is a historic building located in downtown Ottumwa, Iowa, United States. It was designed by the Des Moines architectural firm of Proudfoot, Rawson, Brooks & Borg.

== History and significance ==
The six-story brick structure, which was completed in 1941, rises 73.18 feet (22 m) above the ground. Hofmann Drug was located on this corner until it was destroyed in a fire. This building's construction utilized then modern fire safety codes when it was built to replace the old Hofman Drug. It became known as the Harvester Building in the 1980s. Beginning in 2008, the building was converted into apartments. It was listed on the National Register of Historic Places in 2010.
