= Riepe Drug Store/G. Ott Block =

- Formerly listed on the U.S. National Register of Historic Places
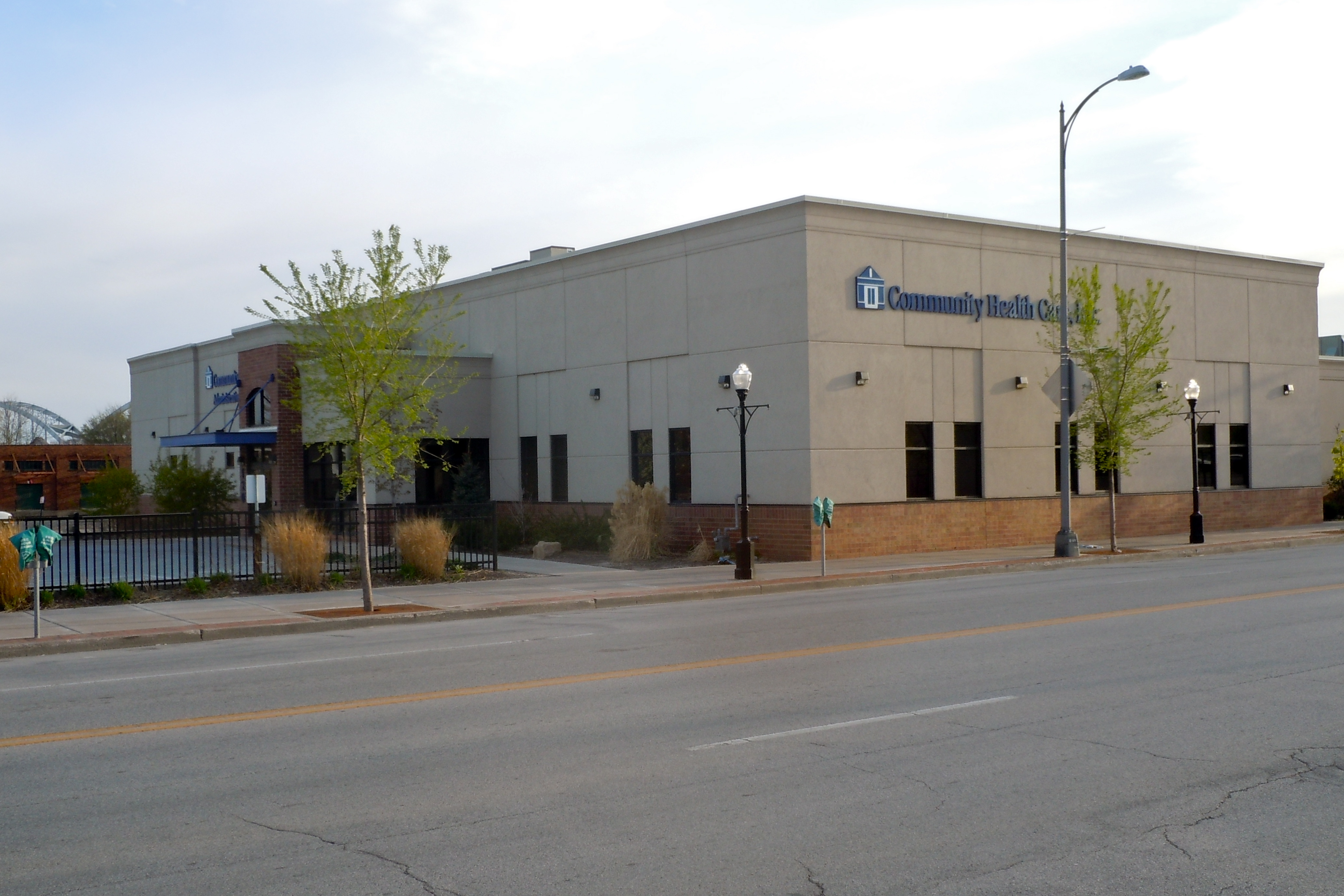
- Location of the Riepe Drug Store/G. Ott Block was on the left side of this photo

- Location within Iowa Location within the United States
- Location: 403 W. 2nd Street; Davenport, Iowa
- Coordinates: 41°31′16″N 90°34′43″W
- Area: less than one acre
- Built: 1871
- Architectural style: Romanesque Revival
- MPS: Davenport MRA
- NRHP reference No.: 83002493

Significant dates
- Added to NRHP: July 7, 1983
- Removed from NRHP: December 19, 2014

The Riepe Drug Store/G. Ott Block was located in downtown Davenport, Iowa, United States. It was listed on the National Register of Historic Places in 1983.

== History ==
Local brewer W. H. Decker probably built this building as an investment commercial venture in 1871. Peter Schlichting operated a saloon here in the late 1870s, but it was not successful and he lost the property in a Sheriff's sale. Adelbert Riepe opened a drugstore in 1882, and he remained in business for a number of years. Other commercial ventures occupied the main floor commercial space over the years. Along with the former Mueller Lumber Company building on the 500 block of Second Street, this structure was torn down and is now the location of Community Health Care's downtown complex today. It was delisted from the National Register in 2014.

== Architecture ==
The building was a three-story, brick structure in the Romanesque Revival style. It featured ornamental rows of brick, or corbelling, just below the cornice line. Round-arch windows lined the second and third floors and were capped with a keystone. The storefront had been altered in later years.
