= Mueller Lumber Company =

- Formerly listed on the U.S. National Register of Historic Places
- Mueller Lumber Company
- Location: 501 W. 2nd St. Davenport, Iowa
- MPS: Davenport MRA
- NRHP reference No.: 83002474

Significant dates
- Added to NRHP: July 7, 1983
- Removed from NRHP: August 26, 2005

The Mueller Lumber Company was located in downtown Davenport, Iowa, United States. The property was listed on the National Register of Historic Places in 1983. It has since been torn down and it was delisted from the NRHP in 2005. The site is now the main clinic for Community Health Care.

== History ==
The Mueller Lumber Company started as Burnell, Gillett & Company in 1850. In eight years it became one of the largest firms in Davenport employing 90 workers. The company went through several ownership changes after the Civil War. It became DesSaint & Schricker around 1865 and then Schricker & Mueller in 1868 when Christian Mueller, an immigrant from Holstein in present-day Germany, bought out Mr. DesSaint's share of the business. When Mr. Schricker died in July 1883 he became the sole proprietor of the company. The firm led local production figures by the 1870s, but a fire destroyed the mill in 1885 and Mueller had to rebuild.

In 1895 he was joined by his three sons, Frank, Edward, and William, as partners. The company's name was changed to Chris Mueller & Sons. Christian Mueller died in September 1901 and his three sons continued to run the business.
