= Apperson Iowa Motor Car Company Building =

- U.S. National Register of Historic Places
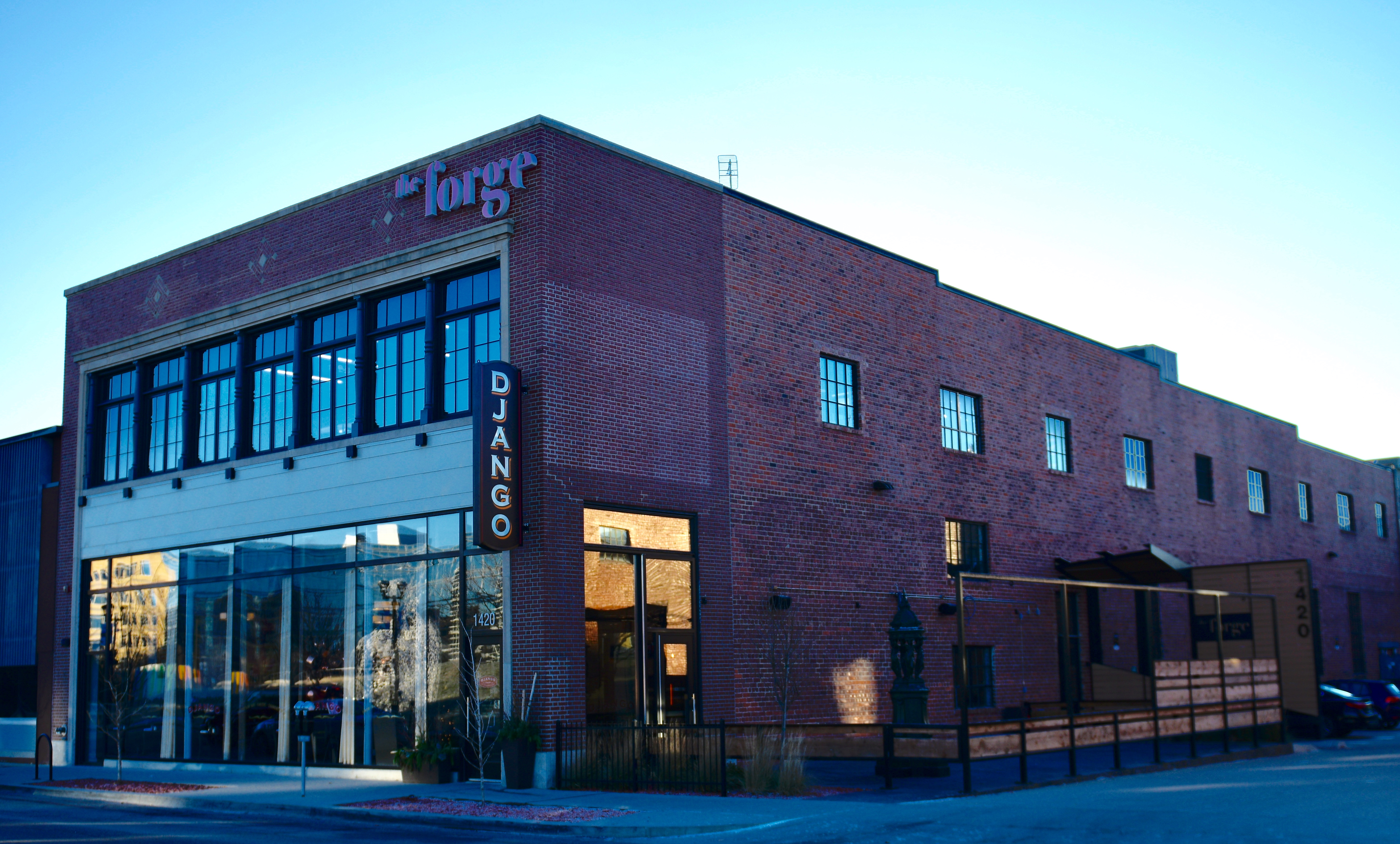

- Location within Iowa Location within the United States
- Location: 1420 Locust St. Des Moines, Iowa
- Coordinates: 41°35′03.4″N 93°38′7.7″W
- Area: less than one acre
- Built: 1921
- Architect: Proudfoot, Bird & Rawson
- Architectural style: Early Commercial; Classical Revival
- MPS: Architectural Legacy of Proudfoot & Bird in Iowa MPS
- NRHP reference No.: 16000363
- Added to NRHP: June 14, 2016

The Apperson Iowa Motor Car Company Building, also known as the Garage Building for Rawson Brothers, is a historic building located in Des Moines, Iowa, United States. It is significant for its association with the prominent Des Moines architectural firm that designed it, Proudfoot, Bird & Rawson. Completed in 1921, it was designed and built within the period of time the firm was at its most prolific (1910–1925). It is also significant for its association with the rise of the Automobile Industry in the city. Auto dealerships and distributorships leased the building from 1921 to 1951. Architect Harry D. Rawson and his brothers owned the building from 1921 to 1938. The two-story structure is located on a midblock lot in the midst of what was the automobile sales, service, and manufacturing district on the western edge of the downtown area. The first floor housed a showroom in the front with offices on a mezzanine. The back of the first floor and the second floor was used for assembling and servicing automobiles. The building was listed on the National Register of Historic Places in 2016.
