= Warfield, Pratt and Howell Company Warehouse =

- U.S. National Register of Historic Places
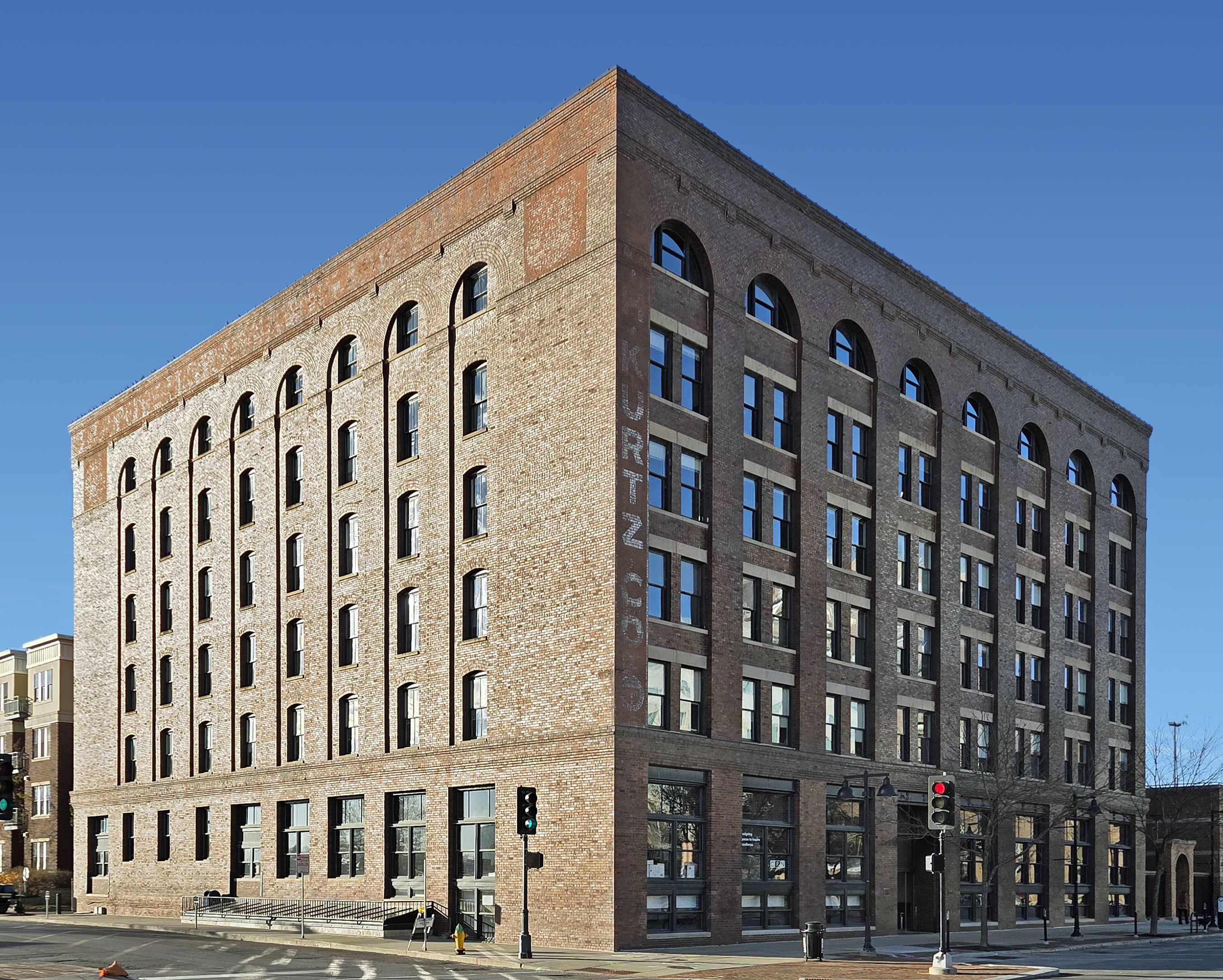
- The Warfield, Pratt and Howell Company Warehouse from the northeast

- Location within Iowa Location within the United States
- Location: 100 Court Avenue, Des Moines, Iowa
- Coordinates: 41°35′7.6″N 93°37′5.5″W
- Area: less than one acre
- Built: 1901, 1909
- Architect: Frank Crocker
- NRHP reference No.: 85001056
- Added to NRHP: May 15, 1985

The Warfield, Pratt and Howell Company Warehouse is a historic building located in downtown Des Moines, Iowa, United States. The building was built by wholesale grocer Warfield, Pratt and Howell Company. Wilson R. Warfield and John W. Howell moved their business to Des Moines in 1860 and moved to this location in 1884. William J. Pratt joined the partnership in 1897. The structure is a six-story commercial and office building that rises 93 feet (28 m) above the ground. The building was designed by architect Frank Crocker and it is considered a good example of warehouse construction from the turn of the 20th century. It was completed in 1901 with an addition by Proudfoot & Bird completed in 1909. It features load-bearing brick piers, bearing walls, and wood column and girder technology on the interior. Other wholesale firms were housed in the building after 1935. It was part of a redeveloped district in the 1980s. The building was listed on the National Register of Historic Places in 1985.
