= Norman Apartment Building =

- U.S. National Register of Historic Places
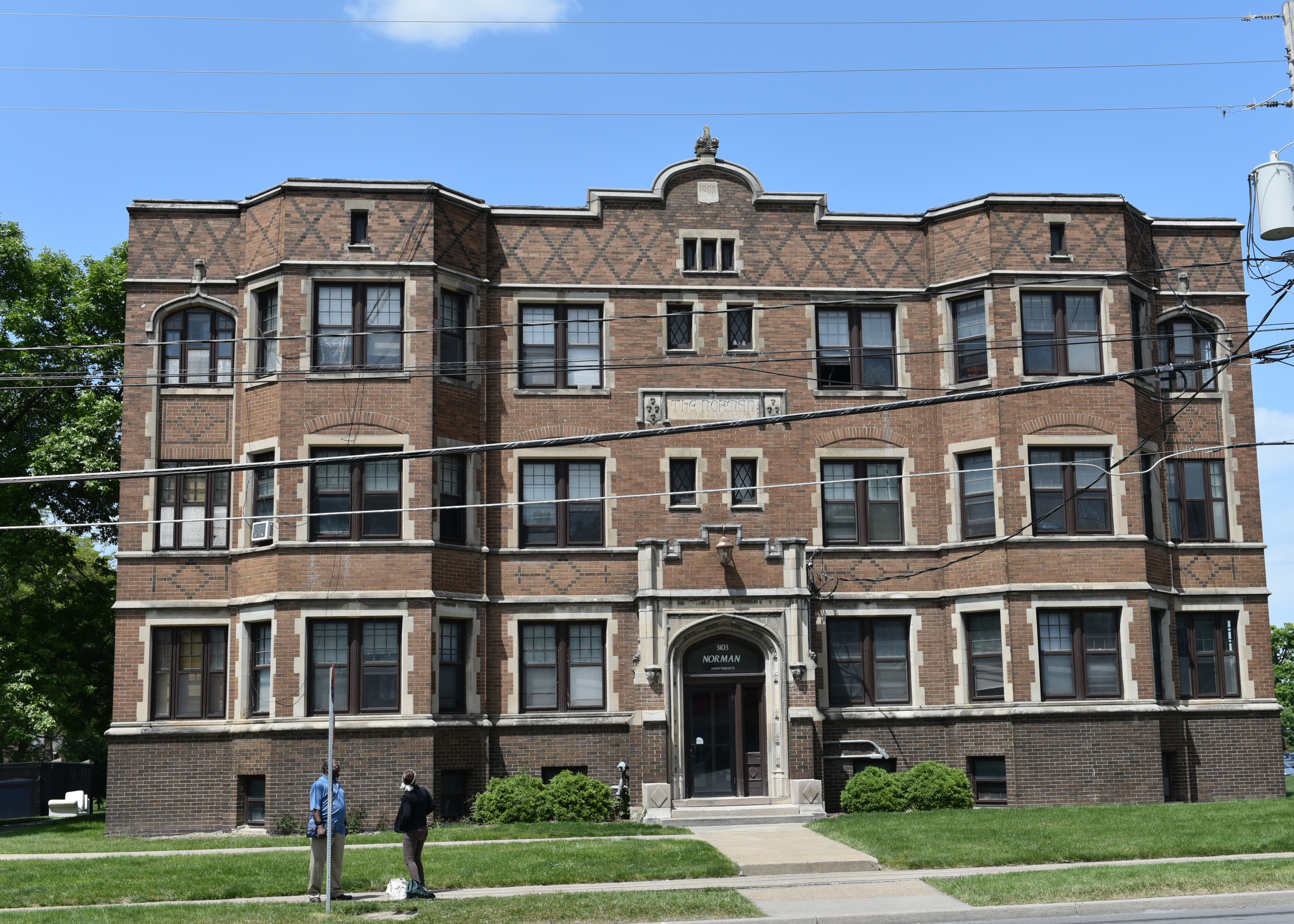

- Location within Iowa Location within the United States
- Location: 3103 University Ave. Des Moines, Iowa
- Coordinates: 41°36′2.1″N 93°39′35.4″W
- Area: less than one acre
- Built: 1908
- Architect: Proudfoot & Bird
- Architectural style: Late Gothic Revival
- MPS: Drake University and Related Properties in Des Moines, Iowa, 1881--1918 MPS
- NRHP reference No.: 88001327
- Added to NRHP: September 8, 1988

The Norman Apartment Building is a historic building located in Des Moines, Iowa, United States. This three-story brick structure was the first of five apartment buildings, housing 60 families, that Drake University planned to build near its campus. They would be controlled by the university's board of trustees. The Norman and the more modest McCoy Apartments were the only two buildings constructed. The building features two shades of tan brick, a considerable amount of Gothic Revival limestone trim, a Tudor arched entry, medieval lettering on a name plaque between the second and third floors, and ogee arches on some windows. The building's significance is related to the "University's growth and development and the effect its financial policies had on nearby settlement." It is also significant for its association with the prominent Des Moines architectural firm of Proudfoot & Bird who designed it. The building was listed on the National Register of Historic Places in 1988.
