= National Register of Historic Places listings in Boone County, Iowa =

Location of Boone County in Iowa

This is a list of the National Register of Historic Places listings in Boone County, Iowa.

This is intended to be a complete list of the properties and districts on the National Register of Historic Places in Boone County, Iowa, United States. Latitude and longitude coordinates are provided for many National Register properties and districts; these locations can be seen together in a map.

There are 18 properties listed on the National Register in the county.

This National Park Service list is complete through NPS recent listings posted October 9, 2026.

	Name on the Register	Image	Date listed	Location	City or town	Description
1	Alonzo J. and Flora Barkley House	Alonzo J. and Flora Barkley House	July 21, 1995 (#95000857)	326 Boone St. 42°03′33″N 93°52′54″W	Boone	
2	Beaver Creek Bridge	Beaver Creek Bridge	June 25, 1998 (#98000762)	210th St. over Beaver Creek; 42°02′57″N 94°08′31″W	Ogden	
3	Big Creek Bridge	Big Creek Bridge	June 25, 1998 (#98000766)	2110 300th St. over Big Creek; 41°55′18″N 93°45′23″W	Madrid	
4	Big Creek Bridge 2	Big Creek Bridge 2	June 25, 1998 (#98000767)	2130 320th St. over Big Creek; 41°53′33″N 93°45′02″W	Madrid	
5	Boone Bridge 2	Boone Bridge 2	June 25, 1998 (#98000765)	1000 200th St. over the Des Moines River; 42°03′47″N 93°58′13″W	Boone	
6	Boone County Courthouse	Boone County Courthouse	July 2, 1981 (#81000226)	N. State and W. 2nd Sts. 42°03′32″N 93°54′21″W	Boone	
7	Boone Viaduct	Boone Viaduct	November 17, 1978 (#78001207)	West of Boone; 42°03′33″N 93°58′12″W	Boone	
8	Carl and Ulrika Dalander Cassel House	Carl and Ulrika Dalander Cassel House	April 12, 1982 (#82002609)	415 W. 2nd St. 41°52′32″N 93°49′31″W	Madrid	
9	Champlin Memorial Masonic Temple	Champlin Memorial Masonic Temple	December 20, 1990 (#90001853)	602 Story St. 42°03′44″N 93°52′45″W	Boone	
10	Des Moines Township #7	Des Moines Township #7	July 12, 2019 (#100004212)	843 R Ave. 42°05′08″N 93°50′06″W	Boone	
11	Ericson Public Library	Ericson Public Library	May 23, 1983 (#83000344)	702 Greene St. 42°03′47″N 93°52′58″W	Boone	
12	First National Bank	First National Bank	June 28, 1989 (#88003232)	8th and Story Sts. 42°03′47″N 93°52′58″W	Boone	
13	John H. Herman House	John H. Herman House	June 28, 1989 (#88003233)	711 S. Story St. 42°02′56″N 93°52′50″W	Boone	
14	Lincoln School		October 15, 2026 (#100013538)	711 W. Mamie Eisenhower Avenue; 42°03′34″N 93°54′06″W	Boone	
15	Perrigo-Holmes House	Perrigo-Holmes House	September 8, 1994 (#94001102)	721 Carroll St. 42°03′48″N 93°53′07″W	Boone	
16	J.H. Riekenberg House	J.H. Riekenberg House	April 11, 1988 (#87002017)	310 N. Tama St. 42°03′32″N 93°52′34″W	Boone	
17	Squaw Creek Bridge 2	Squaw Creek Bridge 2	June 25, 1998 (#98000764)	110th St. and V Ave. over Squaw Creek; 42°11′44″N 93°46′31″W	Ridgeport	
18	Stoll Bottling Works	Stoll Bottling Works	May 2, 1997 (#97000390)	824 Allen St. 42°03′53″N 93°52′43″W	Boone	

== Former listings ==
	Name on the Register	Image	Date listed	Date removed	Location	City or town	Description
1	Boone Bridge		June 25, 1998 (#98000761)	December 19, 2014	Old U.S. Route 30 over the Des Moines River; 42°02′32″N 93°56′00″W	Boone	
2	Finnegan Flats		September 20, 1977 (#77000499)	April 14, 1983	710-718 7th St.	Boone	Demolished in October 1982.
3	Squaw Creek Bridge		June 25, 1998 (#98000763)	September 8, 2022	120th St. and V Ave. over Squaw Creek; 42°10′51″N 93°45′28″W	Ridgeport	

== See also ==
- List of National Historic Landmarks in Iowa
- National Register of Historic Places listings in Iowa
- Listings in neighboring counties: Dallas, Greene, Hamilton, Polk, Story, Webster
