= Marsh Rainbow Arch Bridge =

Marsh Rainbow Arch Bridge may refer to:

- Marsh Rainbow Arch Bridge (Lake City, Iowa), listed on the National Register of Historic Places in Calhoun County, Iowa
- Marsh Rainbow Arch Bridge (Chippewa Falls, Wisconsin), listed on the National Register of Historic Places in Chippewa County, Wisconsin
- Marsh Concrete Rainbow Arch Bridge, in Cambria Township, Blue Earth County, Minnesota
- Rainbow Arch Bridge (Valley City, North Dakota), built by Marsh Engineering Company
