= Squaw Creek Bridge 2 =

- U.S. National Register of Historic Places
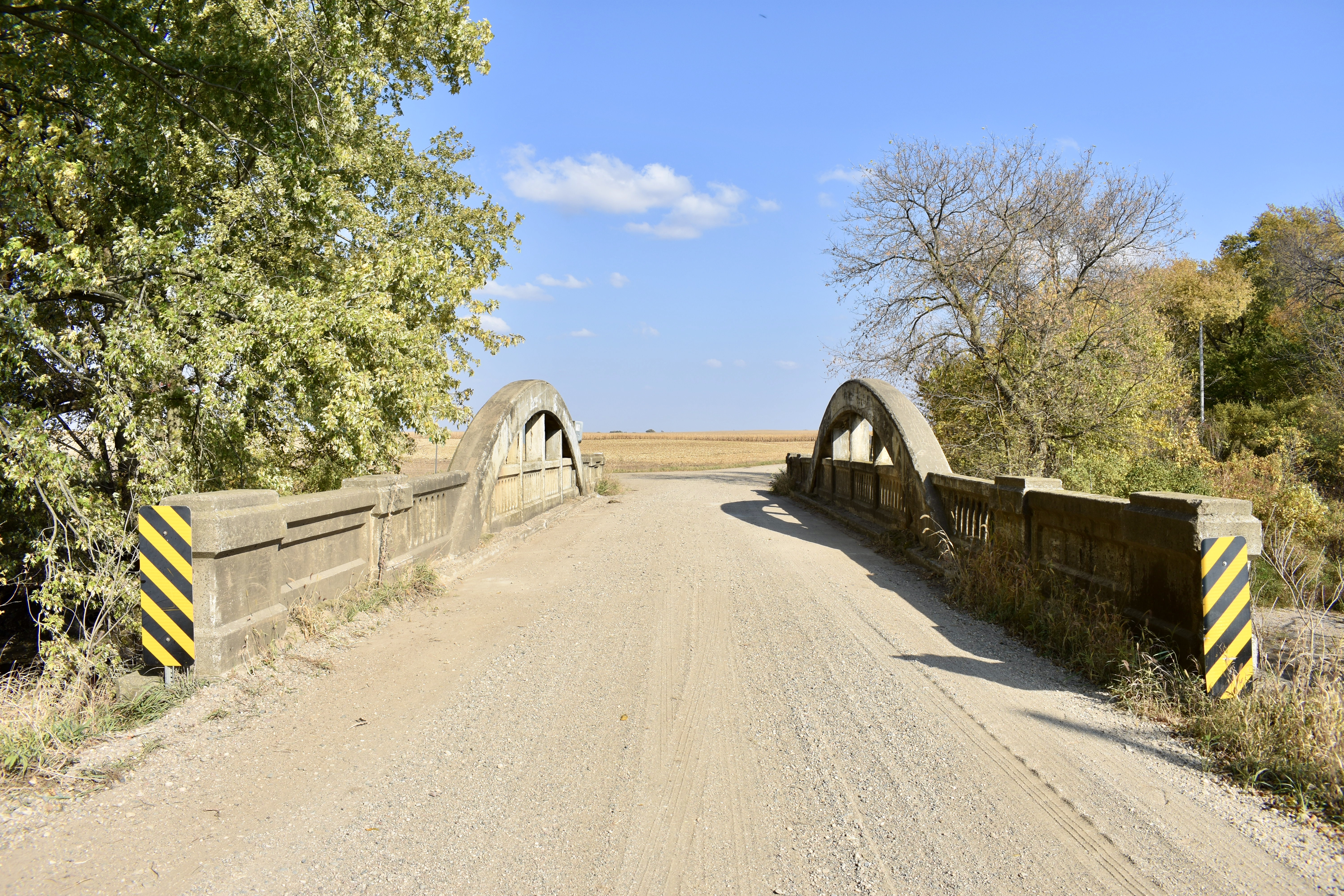
- The road in front of the bridge over the Ioway Creek

- Location within Iowa Location within the United States
- Location: 110th St. and V Ave. over Ioway Creek
- Nearest city: Ridgeport, Iowa
- Coordinates: 42°11′44″N 93°46′31″W
- Area: less than one acre
- Built: 1918
- Built by: N.E. Marsh & Son Construction Company
- Architect: James B. Marsh
- Architectural style: Marsh arch bridge
- MPS: Highway Bridges of Iowa MPS
- NRHP reference No.: 98000764
- Added to NRHP: June 25, 1998

Squaw Creek Bridge 2 is located in Harrison Township near the unincorporated community of Ridgeport in rural Boone County, Iowa, United States. It spans Ioway Creek (formerly named Squaw Creek) for 88 feet (27 m). The Marsh arch bridge was designed by Des Moines engineer James B. Marsh, and built by the N.E. Marsh & Son Construction Company of Des Moines in 1918. The bridge was listed on the National Register of Historic Places in 1998.

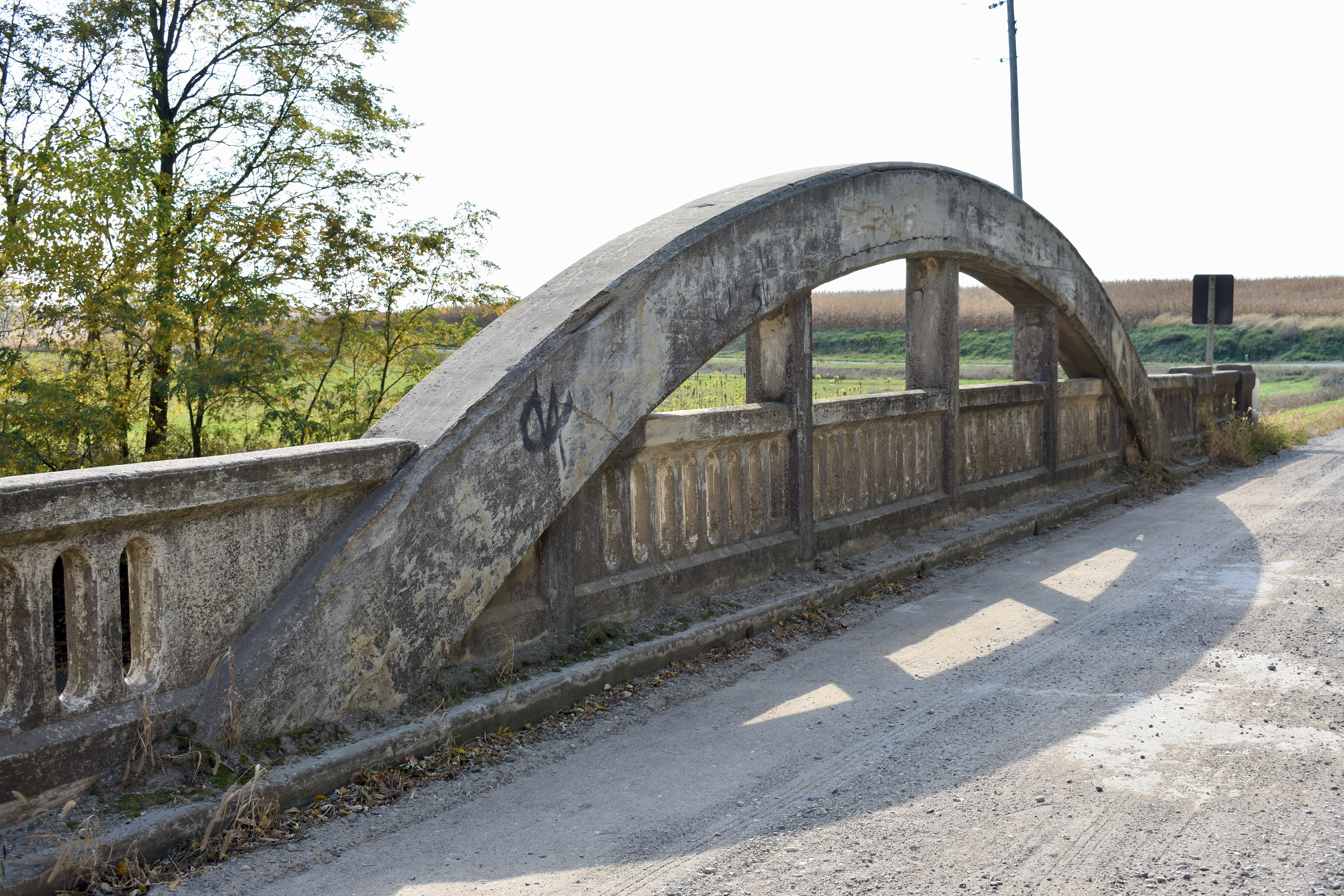
North side of bridge

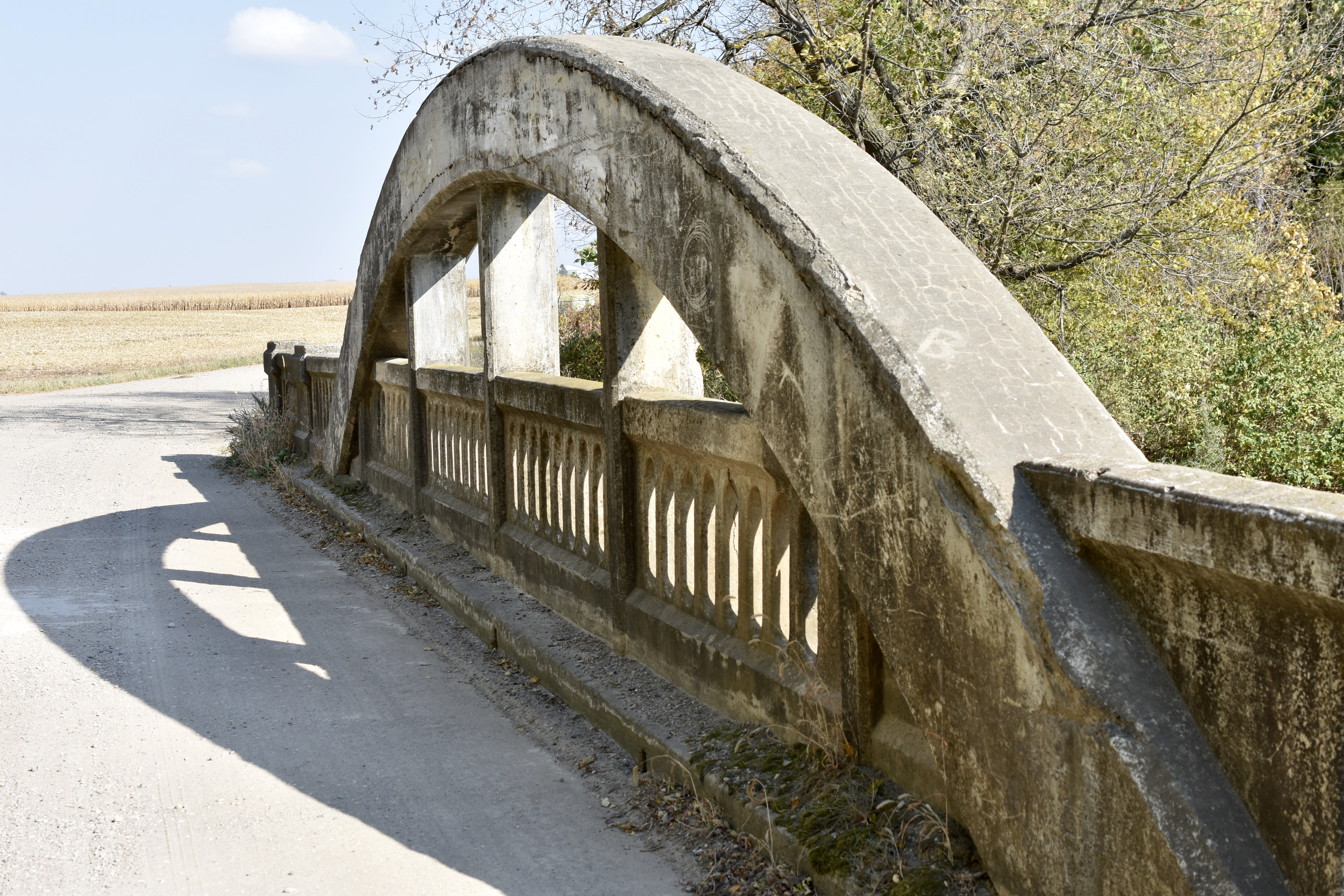
South side of bridge
