= Big Creek Bridge =

Big Creek Bridge may refer to:

- Big Creek Bridge (Antigua)
- Big Creek Bridge (California)
- Big Creek Bridge (Madrid, Iowa)
- Big Creek Bridge 2 in Iowa
- Big Creek Bridge (Oregon)
