= Marsh Engineering Company =

Coordinates: 41.58599°N 93.629764°W

The Marsh Engineering Company was a company that designed many significant bridges in the United States, including a number that survive and are listed on the National Register of Historic Places. It was located at 206 Masonic Temple in Des Moines, Iowa.

The firm's principal engineer was James Barney Marsh (1856–1936), an engineer and bridge designer born in North Lake, Wisconsin.

Works include:

- Dunkerton Bridge (1909), Town street over Crane Creek, Dunkerton, Iowa (NRHP-listed)

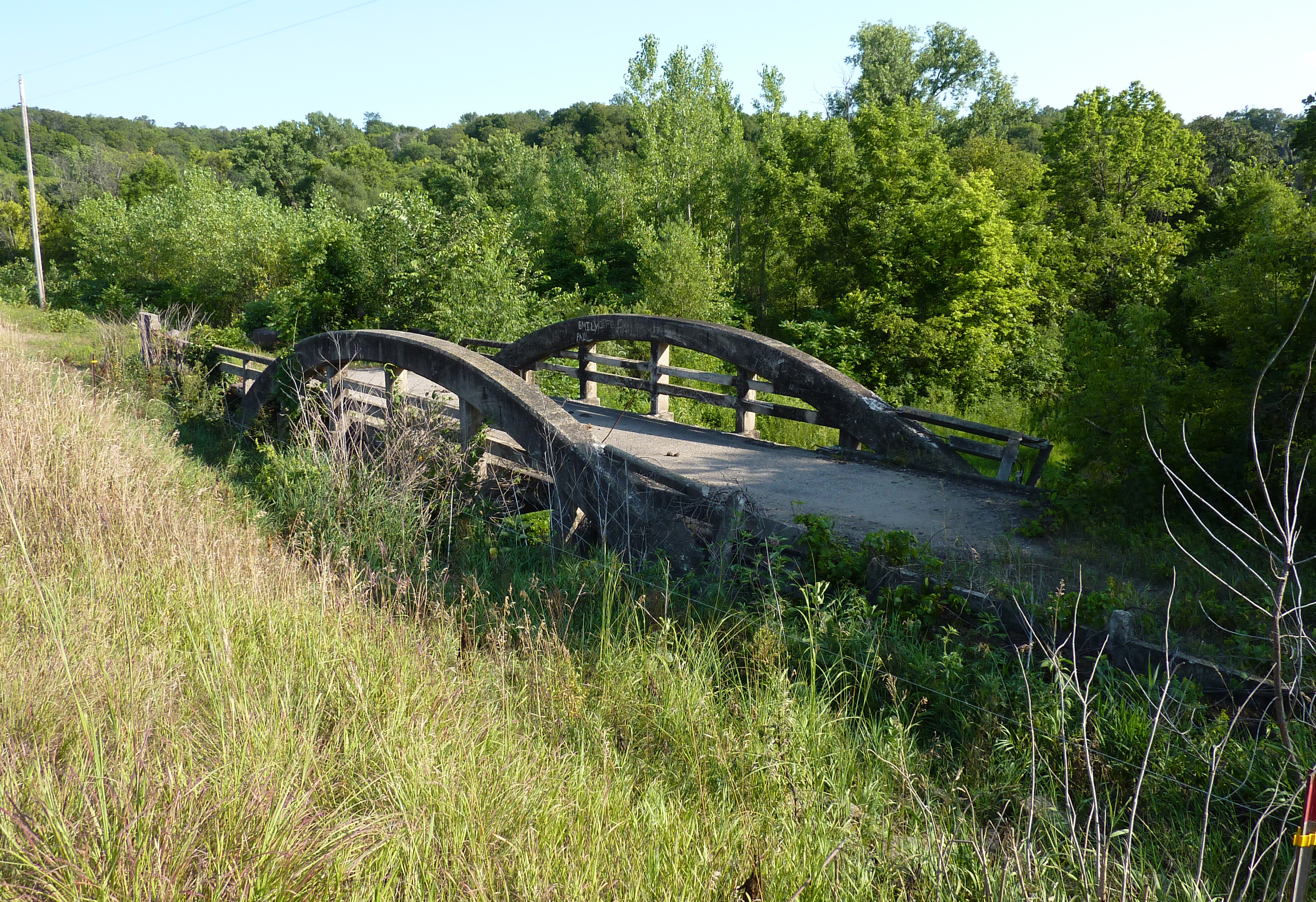
Marsh Concrete Rainbow Arch Bridge

- Marsh Concrete Rainbow Arch Bridge (1911), Courtland, Minnesota, is a reinforced concrete through arch bridge, built in 1911 the same year that Marsh obtained a patent for his design. (NRHP-listed)
- Rainbow Arch Bridge at Valley City, North Dakota, (was NRHP-listed but was later removed)
- Squaw Creek Bridge (1917), 120th St. and V Ave. over Squaw Creek, Ridgeport, Iowa (NRHP-listed)
- Mederville Bridge (1918), County road over Volga River, Mederville, Iowa (NRHP-listed)
- First Avenue Bridge (1920), US 151 over Cedar River, Cedar Rapids, Iowa (NRHP-listed)
- Rainbow Arch Bridge (1922), CO 52, Fort Morgan, Colorado (NRHP-listed)
- River Street Bridge (1922-24), Iowa Falls, Iowa (NRHP-listed)

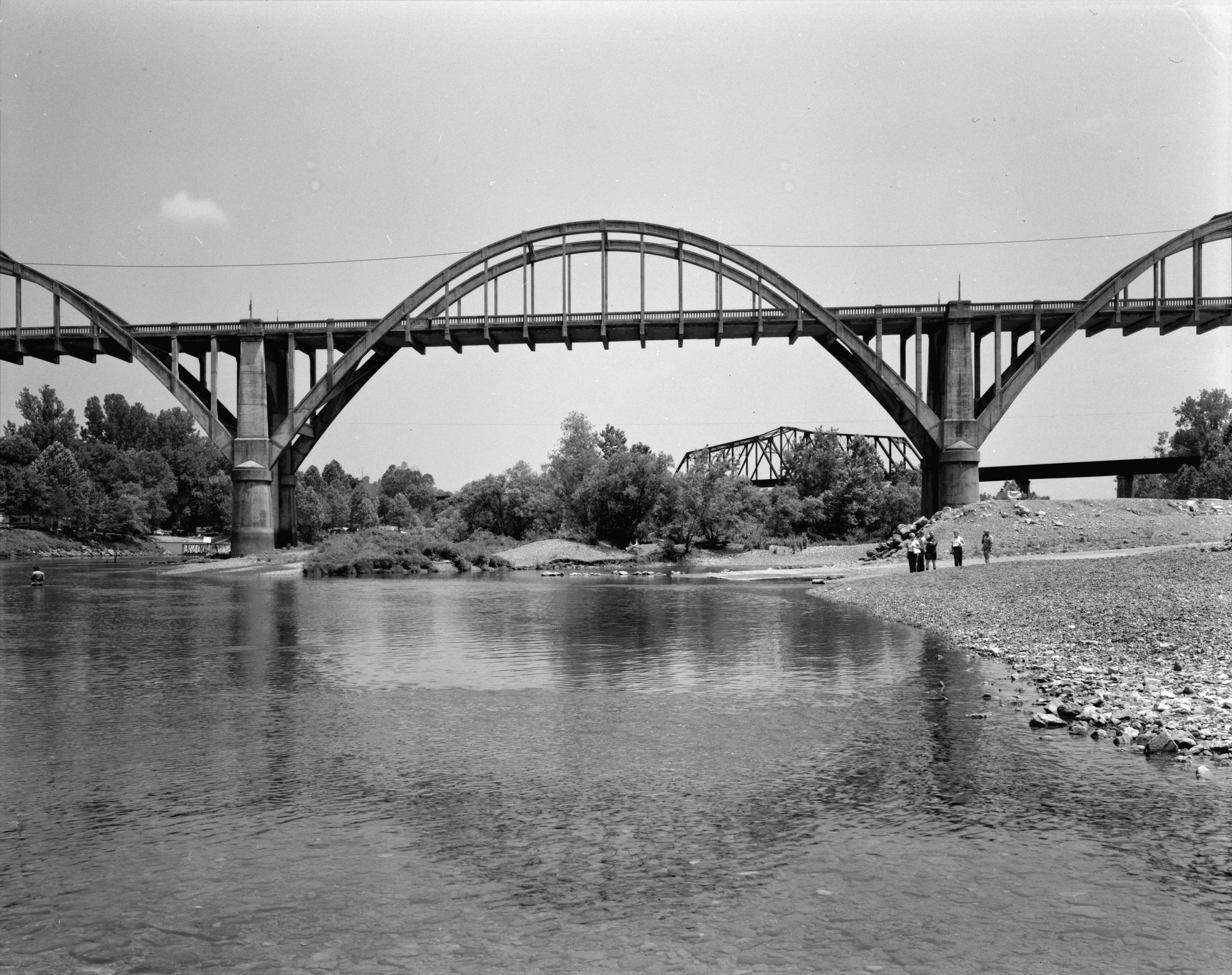
Cotter Bridge in 1988

- Cotter Bridge, constructed in 1930, is the only bridge built by Marsh Engineering Company of Des Moines, Iowa in the state of Arkansas. It brings U.S. Route 62, over the White River, and opened up a large area of the Ozarks for recreation. (NRHP-listed)

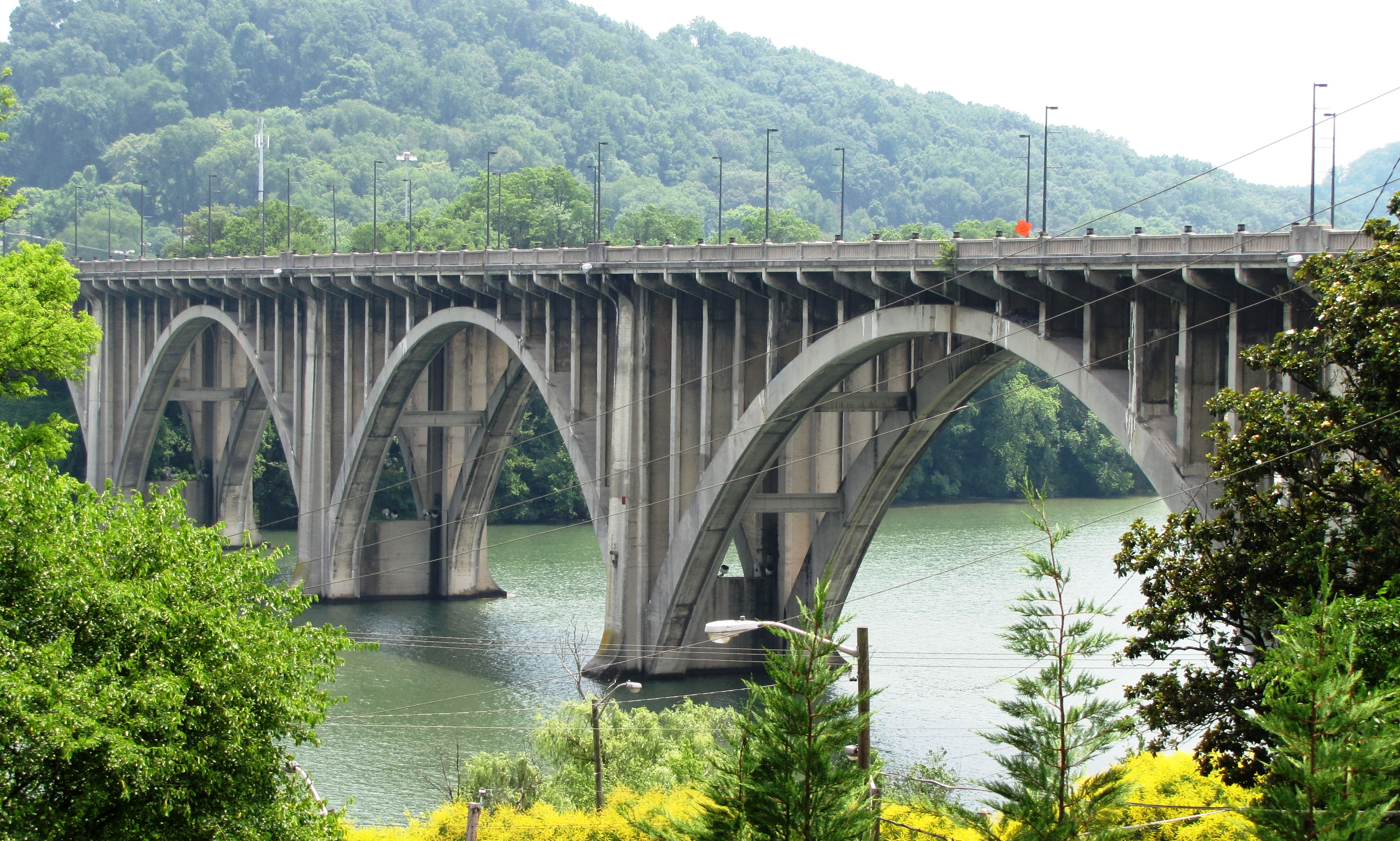
Henley Street Bridge, in Knoxville, TN

- Henley Street Bridge, in Knoxville, Tennessee, designed in 1930

The Wilson River Bridge (1931), near Tillamook, Washington, and others like it in Washington were designed by notable architect Conde McCullough, who had been employed at Marsh Engineering Company during the 1910s.
