= Cedar Creek Bridge =

Cedar Creek Bridge may refer to:

in the United States

(by state)

- Cedar Creek Bridge (Petit Jean State Park, Arkansas), listed on the NRHP in Arkansas
- Cedar Creek Bridge (Rosie, Arkansas), listed on the NRHP in Arkansas
- Cedar Creek Bridge (Rudy, Arkansas), formerly on the NRHP in Arkansas
- Cedar Creek Bridge (Elgin, Kansas), listed on the NRHP in Kansas
- Cedar Creek Bridge (Haynes, North Dakota), listed on the NRHP in North Dakota
