= Mederville Bridge =

- U.S. National Register of Historic Places
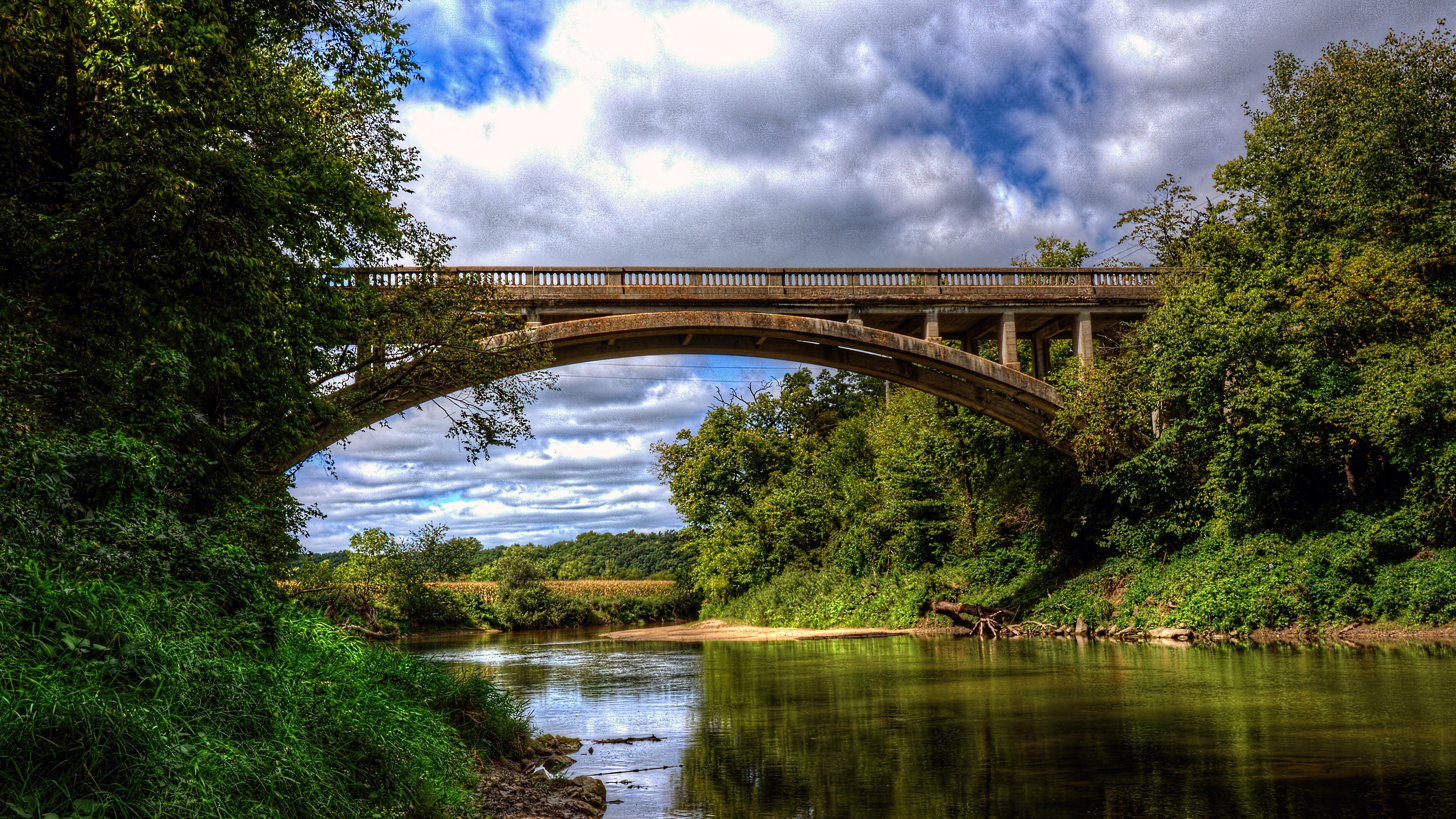

- Location within Iowa Location within the United States
- Location: County road over the Volga River at Mederville
- Coordinates: 42°45′49.1″N 91°25′17.6″W
- Built: 1918
- Built by: F. E. Marsh and Company
- Architect: Marsh Engineering Company
- Architectural style: Concrete open spandrel arch
- MPS: Highway Bridges of Iowa MPS
- NRHP reference No.: 98000808
- Added to NRHP: June 25, 1998

The Mederville Bridge is a historic structure located in the unincorporated community of Mederville, Iowa, United States. It spans the Volga River for 156 feet (48 m). This is one of only a few open spandrel arch bridges constructed in Iowa. Designed by the Marsh Engineering Company of Des Moines, it replaced a covered timber Howe truss bridge. Clayton County rejected all of the original bids to build the structure when they all came in too high. Six companies bid a second time on the project, and F. E. Marsh and Company of Des Moines won. They completed in the bridge in 1918 for $17,454.32. It was listed on the National Register of Historic Places in 1998.

== See also ==
- List of bridges documented by the Historic American Engineering Record in Iowa
