= Squaw Creek Bridge =

- Formerly listed on the U.S. National Register of Historic Places
- Location within Iowa Location within the United States
- Location: 120th St. and V Ave. over Ioway Creek
- Nearest city: Ridgeport, Iowa
- Coordinates: 42°10′51″N 93°45′28″W
- Area: less than one acre
- Built: 1917
- Built by: N.E. Marsh & Son Construction Company
- Architect: James B. Marsh
- Architectural style: Marsh arch bridge
- MPS: Highway Bridges of Iowa MPS
- NRHP reference No.: 98000763

Significant dates
- Added to NRHP: June 25, 1998
- Removed from NRHP: September 8, 2022

The Squaw Creek Bridge was located in Harrison Township near the small unincorporated community of Ridgeport in rural Boone County, Iowa, United States. It spanned Ioway Creek, formerly named Squaw Creek, for 76 feet (23 m). The Boone County Board of Supervisors awarded a contract to the N.E. Marsh & Son Construction Company of Des Moines in August 1917 for $6,278. Designed by Des Moines engineer James B. Marsh, the Marsh arch bridge was completed the same year. The bridge was listed on the National Register of Historic Places (NRHP) in 1998. It has subsequently been replaced by a new span. The bridge was removed form the NRHP in 2022.
