= Avis Overhead Bridge =

Historic bridge in Hinton, West Virginia

Coordinates: 37°40′5.7″N 80°53′31.3″W

The Avis Overhead Bridge (Hinton Main Street Bridge) is located in Hinton, West Virginia. It was constructed in 1927-1930 in partnership with the City of Hinton and C&O Railroad to replace a previous at grade crossing. The construction company that built the bridge is unknown at this time, but the design of the bridge is similar to the patented Marsh Arch Rainbow Through Arch bridges.

The bridge was closed to vehicle traffic in 2003 after a new bridge was built nearby. In 2016, the bridge was added to a list for preservation by the Preservation Alliance of West Virginia. According to the preservation alliance, the West Virginia Department of Transportation is looking for a nonprofit that will take ownership of the bridge. The nonprofit would have to be able to repair or dismantle the bridge.
