= List of bridges documented by the Historic American Engineering Record in North Dakota =

This is a list of bridges documented by the Historic American Engineering Record in the U.S. state of North Dakota.

== Bridges ==
Survey No.	Name (as assigned by HAER)	Status	Type	Built	Documented	Carries	Crosses	Location	County	Coordinates
MN-72	Enloe Bridge No. 90021	Replaced	Pratt truss	1917	1993	CR 28	Red River of the North	Abercrombie, North Dakota, and Wolverton, Minnesota	Richland County, North Dakota, and Wilkin County, Minnesota	46°29′56″N 96°44′19″W
ND-1	Mott Rainbow Arch Bridge	Replaced	Reinforced concrete Marsh rainbow arch	1921	1980	East 1st Street	Cannonball River	Mott	Hettinger	46°22′15″N 102°19′41″W
ND-2	Bismarck Bridge (Note: See also HAER No. NE-2, "Nebraska City Bridge" for additional documentation)	Replaced	Whipple truss	1882	1986	Northern Pacific Railway	Missouri River	Bismarck and Mandan	Burleigh and Morton	46°49′05″N 100°49′35″W
ND-5	Griggs County Bridge	Replaced	Warren truss	1912	1989	4th Street Southeast	Sheyenne River	Cooperstown	Griggs	47°21′25″N 97°59′54″W
ND-6	Northern Pacific Railroad Overhead Bridge	Replaced	Warren truss	1933	1990	ND 6	Northern Pacific Railway	Mandan	Morton	46°49′26″N 100°54′07″W
ND-7	Liberty Memorial Bridge	Replaced	Warren truss	1922	1990	I-94 BL	Missouri River	Bismarck and Mandan	Burleigh and Morton	46°48′30″N 100°49′10″W
ND-8	Lost Bridge	Replaced	Parker truss	1930	1992	ND 22	Little Missouri River	Killdeer	Dunn	47°35′47″N 102°45′40″W
ND-14	Rainbow Arch Bridge	Replaced	Reinforced concrete Marsh rainbow arch	1926	2003	I-94 BL (Main Street East)	Sheyenne River	Valley City	Barnes	46°55′25″N 97°59′29″W
