= Big Creek Bridge (Madrid, Iowa) =

- U.S. National Register of Historic Places
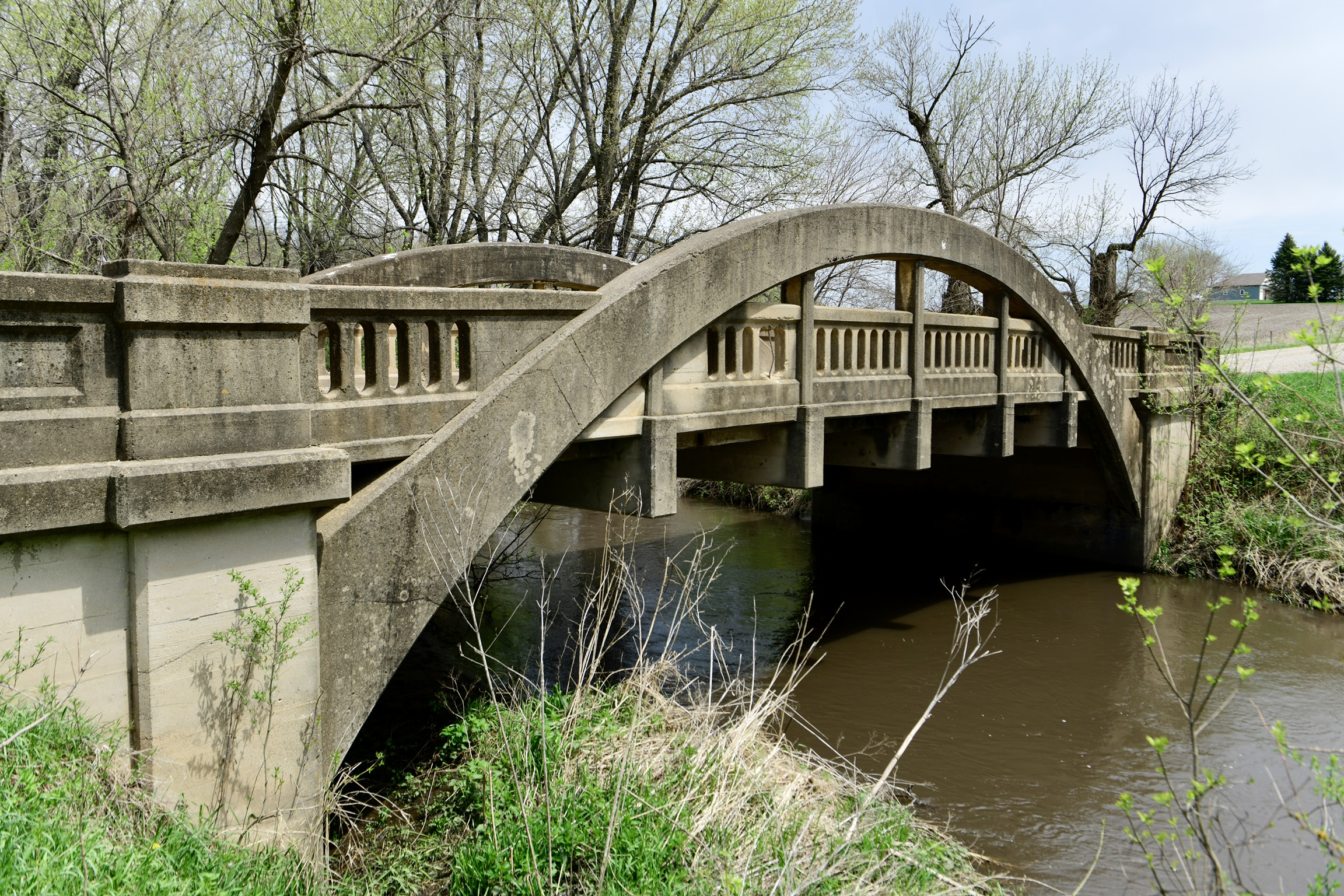
- Big Creek Bridge 2 is similar to this bridge, which was replaced in 2004.

- Location within Iowa Location within the United States
- Location: 2110 300th St. over Big Creek
- Nearest city: Madrid, Iowa
- Coordinates: 41°55′17.8″N 93°45′23.5″W
- Area: less than one acre
- Built: 1916
- Built by: N.E. Marsh & Son Construction Company
- Architect: James B. Marsh
- Architectural style: Marsh arch bridge
- MPS: Highway Bridges of Iowa MPS
- NRHP reference No.: 98000766
- Added to NRHP: June 25, 1998

Big Creek Bridge was a historic structure located northeast of Madrid, Iowa, United States. It spanned Big Creek for 43 feet (13 m). The Marsh arch bridge was designed by Des Moines engineer James B. Marsh. It was completed in 1916. The bridge was listed on the National Register of Historic Places in 1998. The historic span was replaced by a new bridge in 2004.
