= First Avenue Bridge =

- U.S. National Register of Historic Places
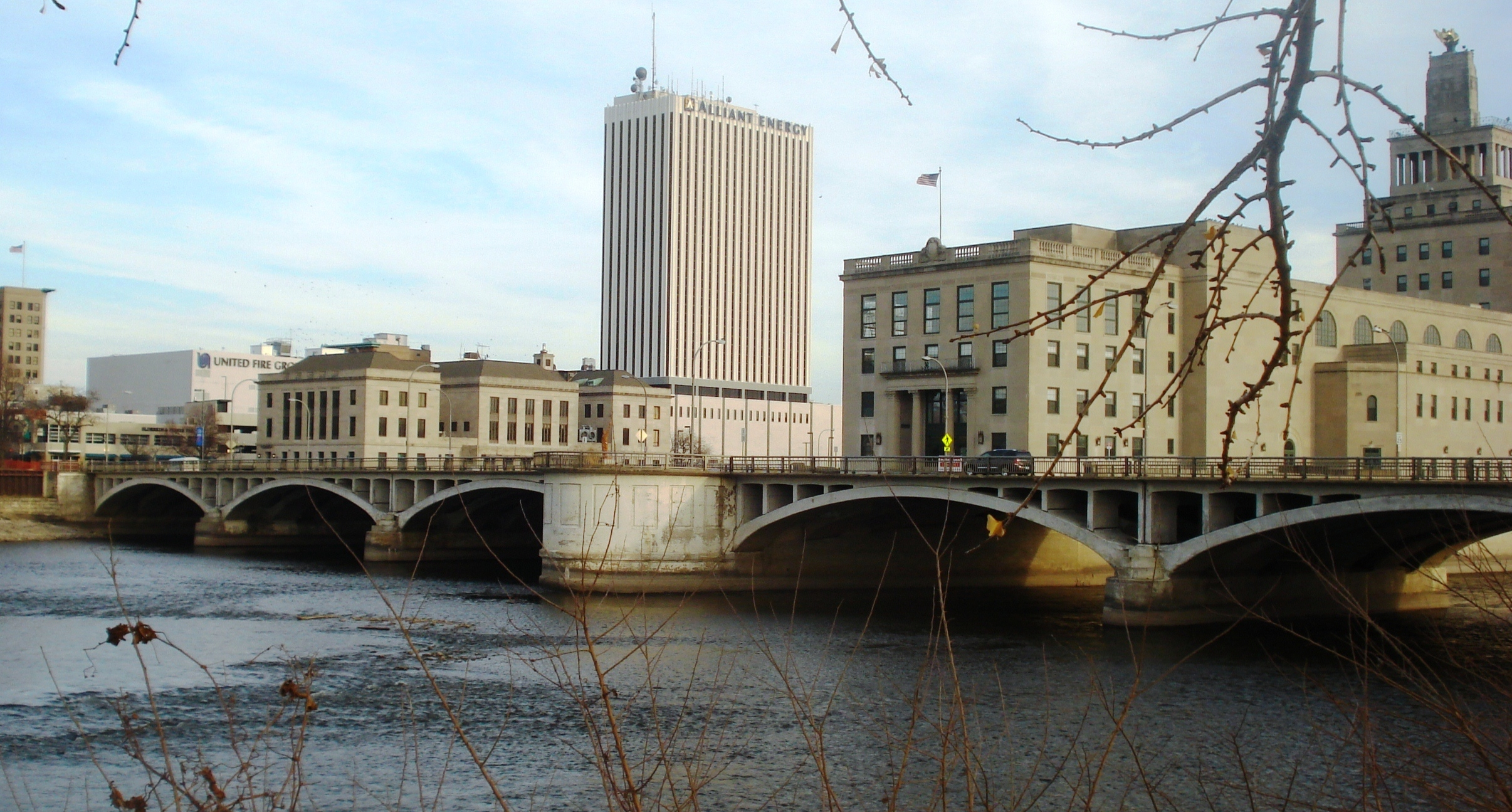

- Location within Iowa Location within the United States
- Location: US 151 over the Cedar River, Cedar Rapids, Iowa
- Coordinates: 41°58′38.2″N 91°40′17.6″W
- Built: 1920
- Built by: Koss Construction Co.
- Architect: Marsh Engineering Company
- MPS: Highway Bridges of Iowa MPS
- NRHP reference No.: 98000530
- Added to NRHP: May 15, 1998

The First Avenue Bridge is a historic structure located in downtown Cedar Rapids, Iowa, United States. It carries U.S. Route 151 for 697 feet (212 m) over the Cedar River. The original six-span concrete arch structure was completed in 1920 for $420,000. It was designed by Marsh Engineering Company and built by Koss Construction Co., both of Des Moines. Consulting engineer Ned L. Ashton of Iowa City designed the 1960s remodel. He had all of the concrete work above the original arches torn out and the bridge rebuilt as an open-spandrel structure. The rebuild also included a wider deck to accommodate increased traffic and aluminum railings. While the bridge's original structural integrity has been compromised, this is the first notable concrete spandrel arch reconstruction in Iowa and possibly in the country. The bridge was listed on the National Register of Historic Places in 1998.

== See also ==
- List of bridges on the National Register of Historic Places in Iowa
- National Register of Historic Places listings in Linn County, Iowa
