= Cotter Bridge =

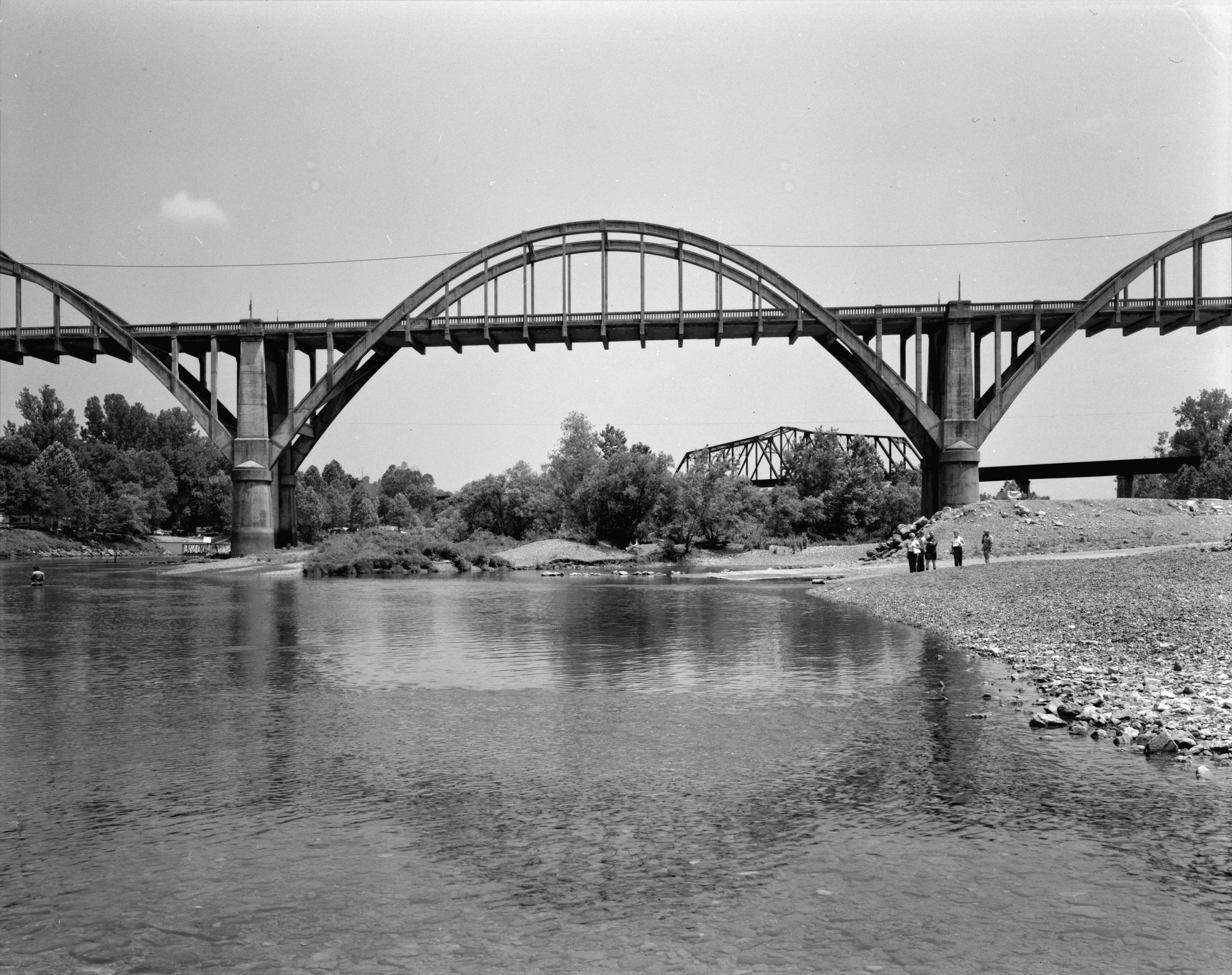
- Cotter Bridge, 1988
- Coordinates: 36°16′2″N 92°32′39″W
- Carries: US 62B
- Crosses: White River
- Locale: Cotter, Arkansas
- Official name: R. M. Ruthven Bridge
- Maintained by: Arkansas State Highway and Transportation Department
- ID number: AHTD 00702

Characteristics
- Design: Marsh Reinforced concrete Arch
- Total length: 1,850 ft (560 m)
- Width: 2 lanes, 24 ft (7.3 m)
- Longest span: 216 ft (66 m)
- Clearance above: 25 ft (7.6 m)
- Clearance below: 78 ft (24 m)

History
- Constructed by: Bateman Contracting Company
- Construction cost: $390,729.82
- Opened: 1930

The Cotter Bridge, also known as the R. M. Ruthven Bridge and the White River Concrete Arch Bridge, carries U.S. Route 62 Business across the White River west of the city of Cotter in Baxter County, Arkansas. Upon completion, the bridge opened a part of the Ozarks previously inaccessible to motorists. Constructed in 1930, it is the only bridge built by the Marsh Engineering Company of Des Moines, Iowa, in the state of Arkansas.

== Getting a bridge in Cotter ==
Cotter was established in 1905 as a railroad town. The area used a ferry system to cross the vast White River, with the nearest road crossing being 100 miles (160 km) north in Branson, Missouri. The river would rise and fall very quickly, which caused the ferry to be very unreliable. Baxter County residents wanted a bridge, but were opposed to the use of toll to pay for it. Once it became apparent that the federal road U.S. Route 62 would replace Arkansas Highway 12 through the area, bridge interest reached a peak. The federal road would bring an economic boom to the tourist-themed Ozarks that had not been developed, but the funding was still not available due to Arkansas' lack of a central road authority. The state approved the use of toll bridges in 1927, as long as they became free upon payment of the debt. Judge R. M. Ruthven concealed a damning feasibility report from the Highway Commission, which would have resulted in the bridge being built elsewhere. Twenty years later, he allegedly mailed the report to the Commission anyway. President Calvin Coolidge signed the bridge into construction on May 2, 1928, and upon approval by the War Department, the bridge was contracted to James Barney Marsh.

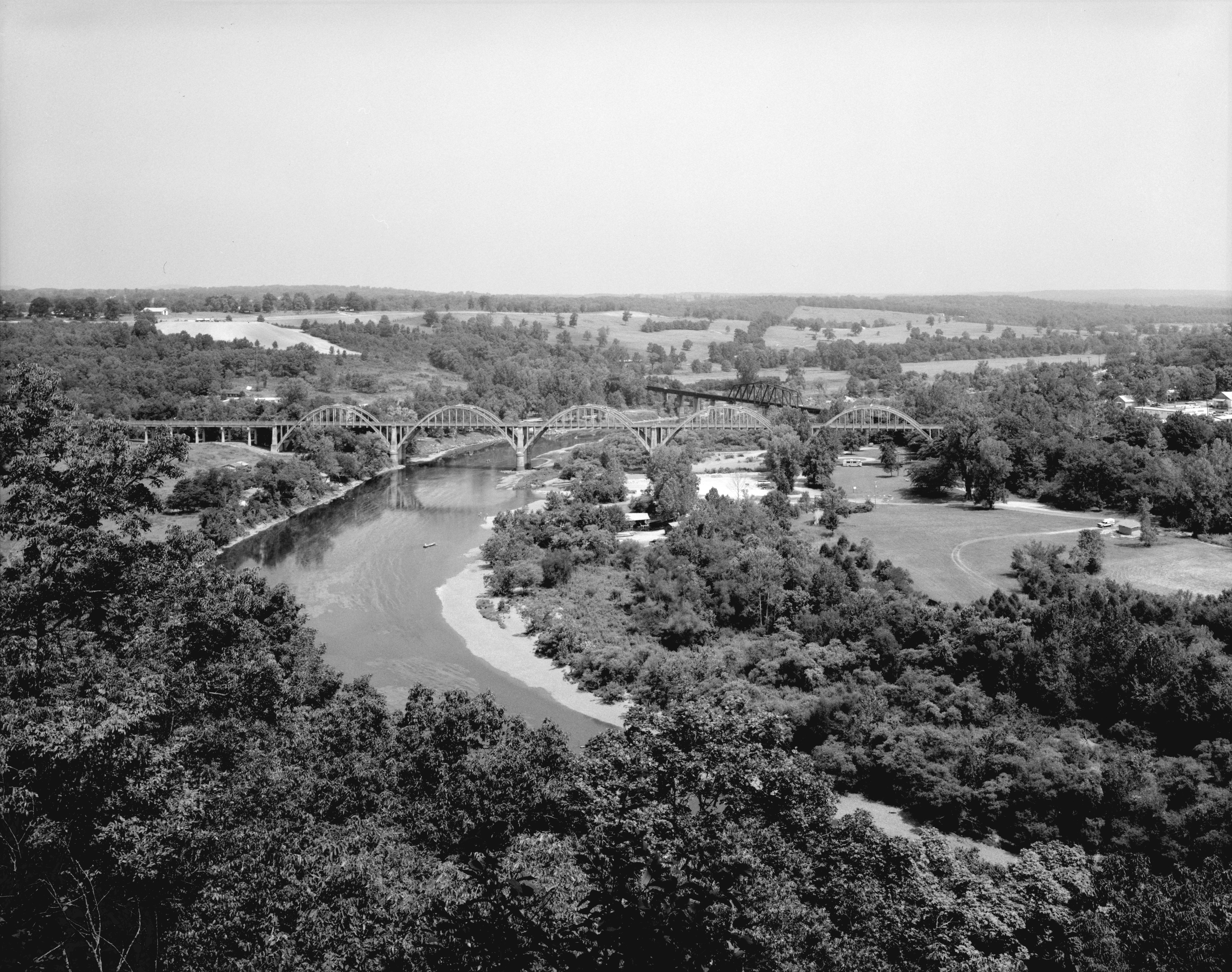
Wide angle view of bridge and its surroundings.

== Construction and opening of the Cotter Bridge ==
The bridge was contracted to a company from Nashville, Tennessee, in 1929, and they used as much local labor as possible. A cable system was used to avoid problems with the mercurial river. The company installed lights and worked around the clock in order to prevent delays. The bridge was dedicated on November 11, 1930, but for months the residents of Cotter continued to use the free ferry system rather than pay the toll. The Highway Department even had to threaten the community with retracted funding unless the residents began using the bridge.

== Today ==
The Cotter Bridge was once proposed to be replaced, but area residents protested, and instead a new bridge was built north of the area. U.S. Route 62 now runs on the new bridge, where the former alignment of US 62 exists today as U.S. Route 62 Business through downtown Cotter. The bridge was designated as a National Historic Civil Engineering Landmark by the American Society of Civil Engineers in 1986; it was Arkansas' first National Historic Civil Engineering Landmark. In 1990, it was added to the National Register of Historic Places (ID 90000518).

== See also ==
- List of bridges documented by the Historic American Engineering Record in Arkansas
- List of bridges on the National Register of Historic Places in Arkansas
- National Register of Historic Places listings in Baxter County, Arkansas
