= Neosho River Bridge =

- U.S. National Register of Historic Places
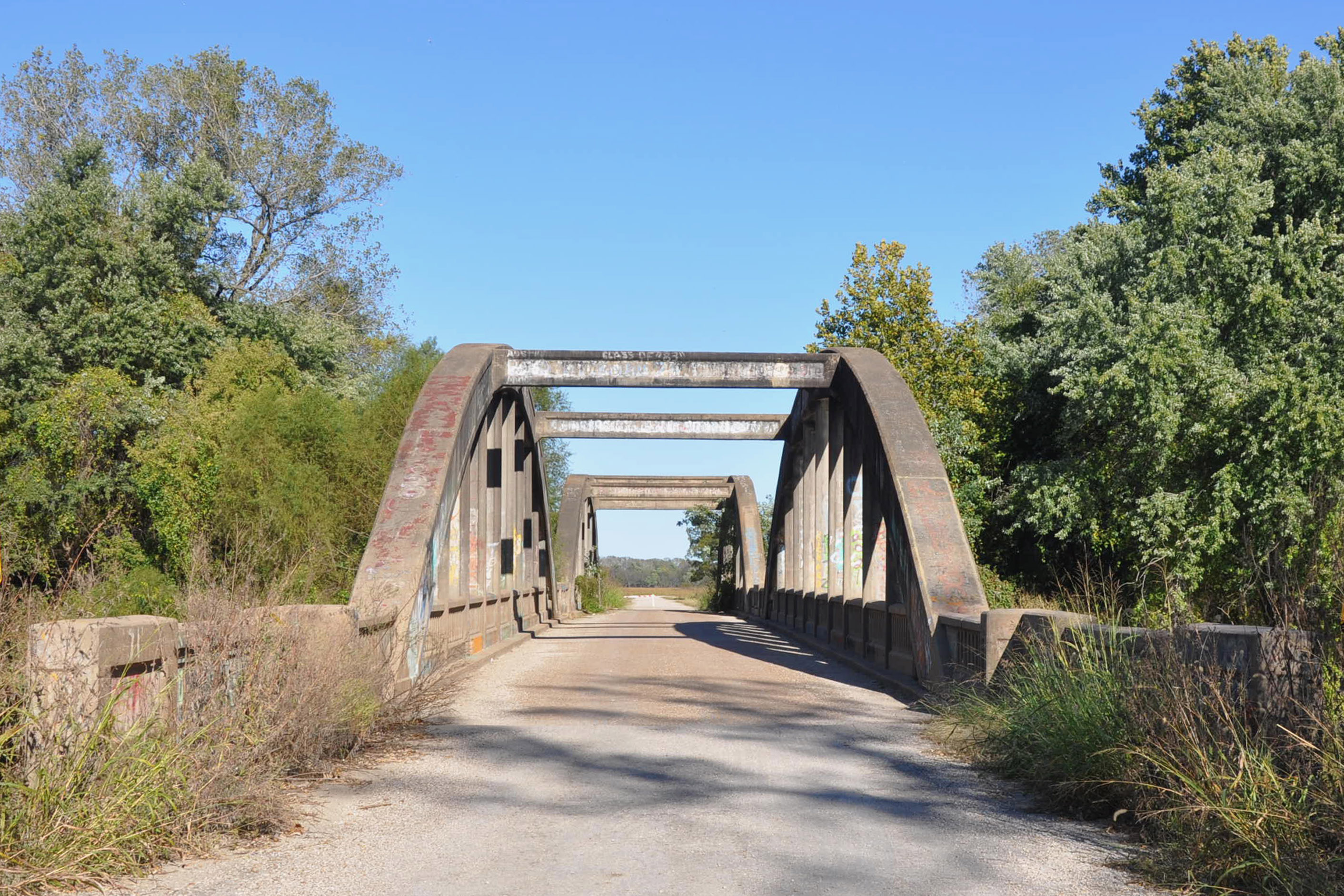

- Location within Kansas
- Nearest city: Hartford, Kansas
- Coordinates: 38.308902°N 95.947913°W
- Area: 0.5 acres (0.20 ha)
- Built: 1926
- Architect: James Barney Marsh
- MPS: Rainbow Arch Marsh Arch Bridges of Kansas TR
- NRHP reference No.: 83000420
- Added to NRHP: March 10, 1983

The Neosho River Bridge, near Hartford, Kansas, United States, was built in 1926. It was listed on the National Register of Historic Places in 1983.

It consists of two 140 feet (43 m) reinforced concrete rainbow arch spans, or "Marsh arch" spans, and carries a 20 feet (6.1 m) wide roadway across the Neosho River. It is located .2 miles (0.32 km) east of Hartford on what was described in 1982 as a county road, and in 2019 is known as 19th Ln.

The bridge design was the work of James Barney Marsh. This example is just one of 72 rainbow arch bridges built in Kansas, but was assessed to have a good chance of survival due to its relatively obscure location.
