= Beaver Creek Bridge (Perry, Iowa) =

- U.S. National Register of Historic Places
- Location within Iowa Location within the United States
- Location: M Ave. over Beaver Creek
- Nearest city: Perry, Iowa
- Coordinates: 41°50′47″N 94°02′53″W
- Built: 1916
- Built by: F.E. Marsh & Co.
- Architect: James B. Marsh
- Architectural style: Marsh arch bridge
- MPS: Highway Bridges of Iowa MPS
- NRHP reference No.: 98000796
- Added to NRHP: June 25, 1998

The Beaver Creek Bridge was a historic bridge located to the east of Perry, Iowa, United States. The 100-foot (30 m) span carried traffic on M Avenue over Beaver Creek. The Dallas County Board of Supervisors bought a rainbow arch bridge design from Des Moines engineer James B. Marsh. They contracted with his son Frank who owned F.E. Marsh & Co. of Jefferson, Iowa to build the bridge for $8,075. The bridge was listed on the National Register of Historic Places in 1998. It has subsequently been removed and replaced.
