= John H. Herman House =

Historic house in Iowa, United States

- U.S. National Register of Historic Places
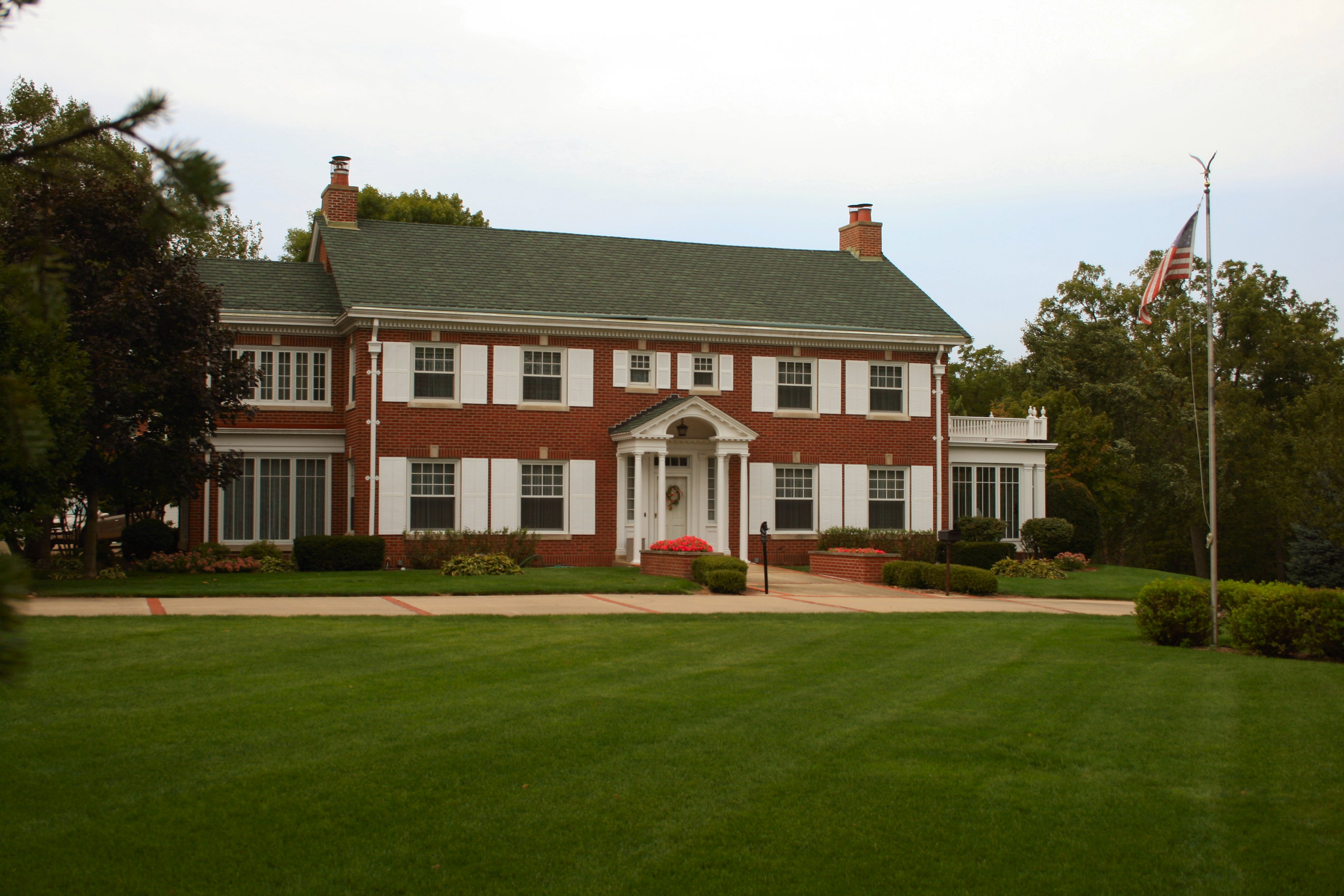

- Location within Iowa Location within the United States
- Location: 711 S. Story St. Boone, Iowa
- Coordinates: 42°02′56″N 93°52′50″W
- Area: Less than one acre
- Built: 1919
- Built by: Gust Carlson
- Architect: Proudfoot, Bird & Rawson
- Architectural style: Colonial Revival
- MPS: Architectural Legacy of Proudfoot & Bird in Iowa MPS
- NRHP reference No.: 88003233
- Added to NRHP: June 28, 1989

The John H. Herman House (also known as the Robert and Coleen Manderscheid House) is a historic house located at 711 South Story Street in Boone, Iowa.

== Description and history ==
Herman was a local banker who served as an officer at the First National Bank. He had the Des Moines architectural firm of Proudfoot, Bird & Rawson, who had just designed the bank's new building, design this house. It is one of nine known structures in Boone attributed to the firm. Local contractor Gust J. Carlson built the house in 1919. The two-story, brick Colonial Revival is typical of how Proudfoot, Bird & Rawson designed this style of house. It features a side gable, side porches offset from the main block, and high quality brick. This is only one of three of their houses of this quality located outside of the immediate Des Moines area. The house was listed on the National Register of Historic Places in 1989.
