= The Big Treehouse =

Coordinates: 42.0119°N 92.8537°W

The Big Treehouse is a 5,000-square-foot (460 m^{2}) tree house begun by a college student in 1983 at the Shady Oaks Campground outside Marshalltown, Iowa. It is a tourist attraction that has been enlarged and made more elaborate over the years.

== Description ==
The Big Treehouse covers 5,000 square feet and has 12 levels that go up to five and a half stories tall surrounding a maple tree. The first 11 levels can be traversed via a 60-step spiral staircase, while a ladder is needed to ascend to the final level. Various levels have tables, birdwatching, meditation facilities, and views. It has electrical and telephone service, as well as several porch swings, and a microwave oven. It also includes a 50-foot (15 m) long flower box, rope lights, and a grill. There are models of the Minneapolis and St. Louis Railway bridge and the Marsh Rainbow Arch Bridge that can both be crossed by visitors. A skyway, styled "Skywalk 2000", winds around the tenth level, the spiral staircase, and the model of the Rainbow Bridge.

== History ==
Michael Jurgensen, whose family owns the Shady Oak Campground, first conceived the project while a college student in spring 1983. He had six pallets of wood sent to Shady Oak Campground and started building by the side of a maple tree. By summer 1983 the first floor and part of the second floor was complete. He makes new additions each year.

The maple tree at the center of the structure was significantly damaged during the August 2020 Midwest Derecho. The treehouse was dismantled in December 2023.

== In the media ==
The tree house was featured during two of the half-hour anthology episodes of Iowa Public Television's series Iowa's Simple Pleasures – "Canoeing, Howell's Florals & Greenhouse, The Big Treehouse, Cedar Rapids Kernels" (S1Ep2) and "Excellent Exhibitions" (S3Ep7). Eric Dregni, in his 2006 book Midwest Marvels, wrote that "The Swiss Family Robinson could only dream of all the amenities in Jurgensen's never-ending treehouse".
