= Des Moines River Bridge (Swea City, Iowa) =

- U.S. National Register of Historic Places
- Location within Iowa Location within the United States
- Location: County Road P14 over the East Fork of the Des Moines River
- Nearest city: Swea City, Iowa
- Coordinates: 43°20′42″N 94°26′33″W
- Built: 1916
- Architect: James B. Marsh
- Architectural style: Marsh fixed arch bridge
- MPS: Highway Bridges of Iowa MPS
- NRHP reference No.: 98000535
- Added to NRHP: May 15, 1998

The Des Moines River Bridge is a historic bridge located southwest of Swea City, Iowa, United States. It spans the Des Moines River for 102 feet (31 m). In February 1916, the Kossuth County Board of Supervisors approved the contract for the Des Moines Marsh Engineering Company to build the bridges. It was designed by the company's engineer James B. Marsh. The 9-panel Marsh fixed arch bridge, also known as a "rainbow arch", was completed in 1916 for $7,150. It features two tapered concrete arches that carry the roadway in between them from hangers. It was listed on the National Register of Historic Places in 1998.
