= Conroe Bridge =

- U.S. National Register of Historic Places
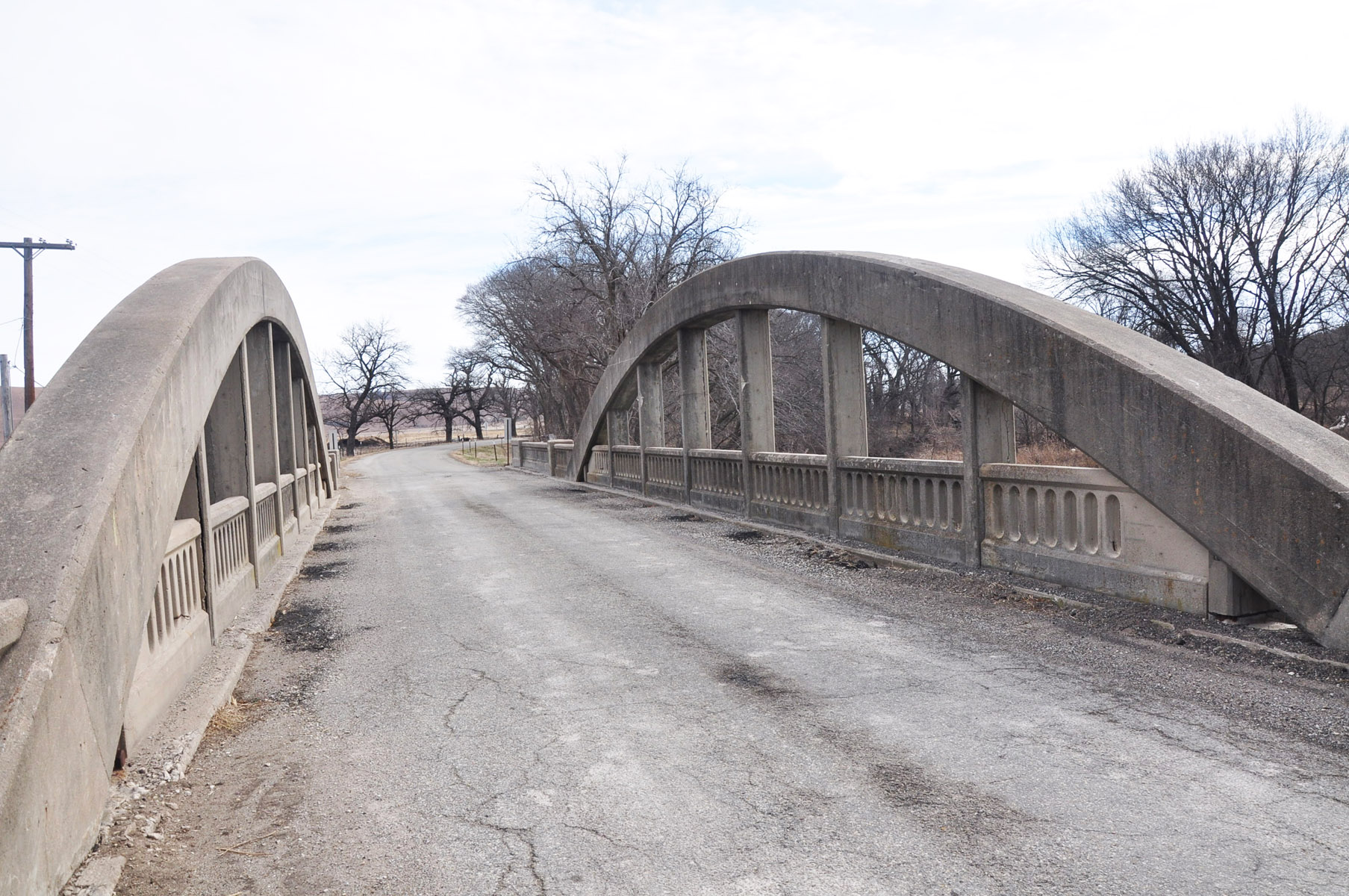

- Location within Kansas Location within the United States
- Location: About 5 miles (8.0 km) ENE of Junction City, Kansas
- Coordinates: 39°2′56″N 96°43′51″W
- Area: 0.5 acres (0.20 ha)
- Built: 1925
- Architect: James Barney Marsh
- MPS: Rainbow Arch Marsh Arch Bridges of Kansas TR
- NRHP reference No.: 83000427
- Added to NRHP: March 10, 1983

The Conroe Bridge, also known as Clark's Creek Bridge, is a Rainbow Arch bridge over Clarks Creek near Junction City, Kansas which was built in 1925. It was listed on the National Register of Historic Places in 1983.

It was built to a design by James Barney Marsh. It is a single span "rainbow arch" or "Marsh arch" about 100 feet (30 m) long, with a 20 feet (6.1 m) wide roadway.
