= Lost Bridge =

- Coordinates: 47°35′47″N 102°45′40″W
- Carries: North Dakota Highway 22
- Crosses: Little Missouri River
- Locale: Killdeer, North Dakota

History
- Opened: 1930
- Closed: 1994

The Lost Bridge was a bridge that was built over the Little Missouri River in 1930, 22 miles (35 km) north of Killdeer, North Dakota, on North Dakota Highway 22. A road to the bridge was finally built 20 years later, hence the name. The Lost Bridge was dismantled in 1994. A plaque and a piece of the old bridge have been installed on Route 22 near the new bridge as a memorial.

== See also ==
- List of bridges documented by the Historic American Engineering Record in North Dakota
