= Dunkerton Bridge =

- U.S. National Register of Historic Places
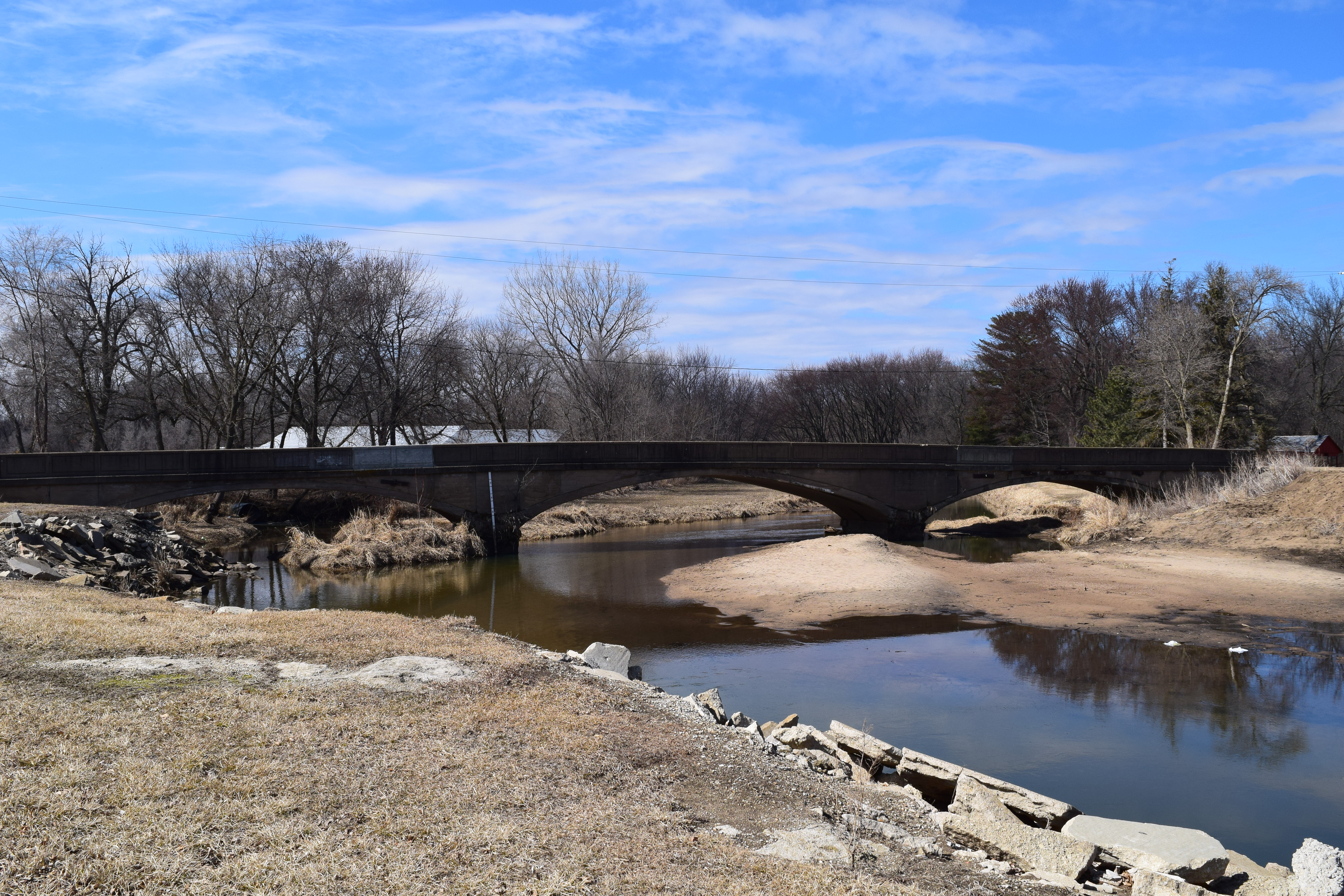

- Location within Iowa Location within the United States
- Location: Local street over Crane Creek, Dunkerton, Iowa
- Coordinates: 42°34′23.8″N 92°09′43.3″W
- Area: less than one acre
- Built: 1909
- Architect: Marsh Engineering Company
- Architectural style: Spandrel arch
- MPS: Highway Bridges of Iowa MPS
- NRHP reference No.: 98000768
- Added to NRHP: June 25, 1998

The Dunkerton Bridge is a historic structure located in Dunkerton, Iowa, United States. The span carried a local street over Crane Creek for 212 feet (65 m). The three-span, filled spandrel arch bridge was built by the Marsh Engineering Company of Des Moines in 1909. It replaced an older span at a different location. The bridge served as the major entry point into the town from the north. This bridge was also replaced by a newer bridge to the east, and this span now carries pedestrian traffic between Charma Park and Marble Street into downtown Dunkerton. It was listed on the National Register of Historic Places in 1998.

== See also ==
- List of bridges on the National Register of Historic Places in Iowa
- National Register of Historic Places listings in Black Hawk County, Iowa
