= J.H. Riekenberg House =

Historic house in Iowa, United States

- U.S. National Register of Historic Places
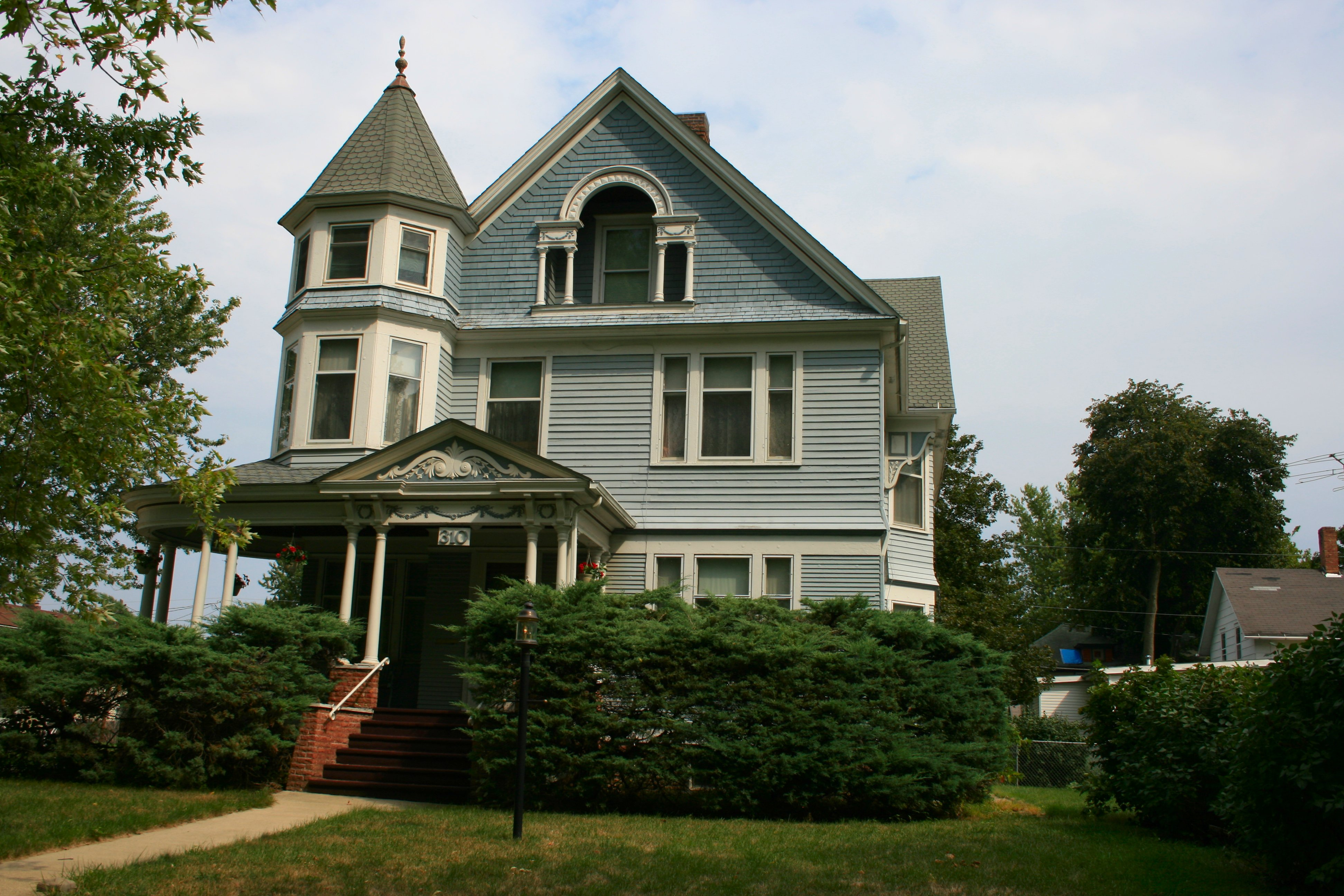

- Location within Iowa Location within the United States
- Location: 310 N. Tama St. Boone, Iowa
- Coordinates: 42°03′32″N 93°52′34″W
- Area: Less than one acre
- Built: 1898
- Built by: J.J. Thoren
- Architect: Charles E. Edwins
- Architectural style: Queen Anne
- NRHP reference No.: 87002017
- Added to NRHP: April 11, 1988

The J.H. Riekenberg House is a historic residence located in Boone, Iowa, United States. Born in Schleswig, Germany, Riekenberg emigrated to the United States in 1867, and became a successful businessman and civic leader in Boone. He had Charles E. Edwins, a local architect, design this house, and local contractor J.J. Thoren built it in 1898. The 2½-story, frame Queen Anne house features an asymmetrical plan, steeply pitched roof, a wrap-around front porch, a variety of wall surface texture, an octagonal corner tower, and Palladian elements in the gable ends. The house was listed on the National Register of Historic Places in 1987.
