= Des Moines Township No. 7 =

- Des Moines Township #7
- U.S. National Register of Historic Places
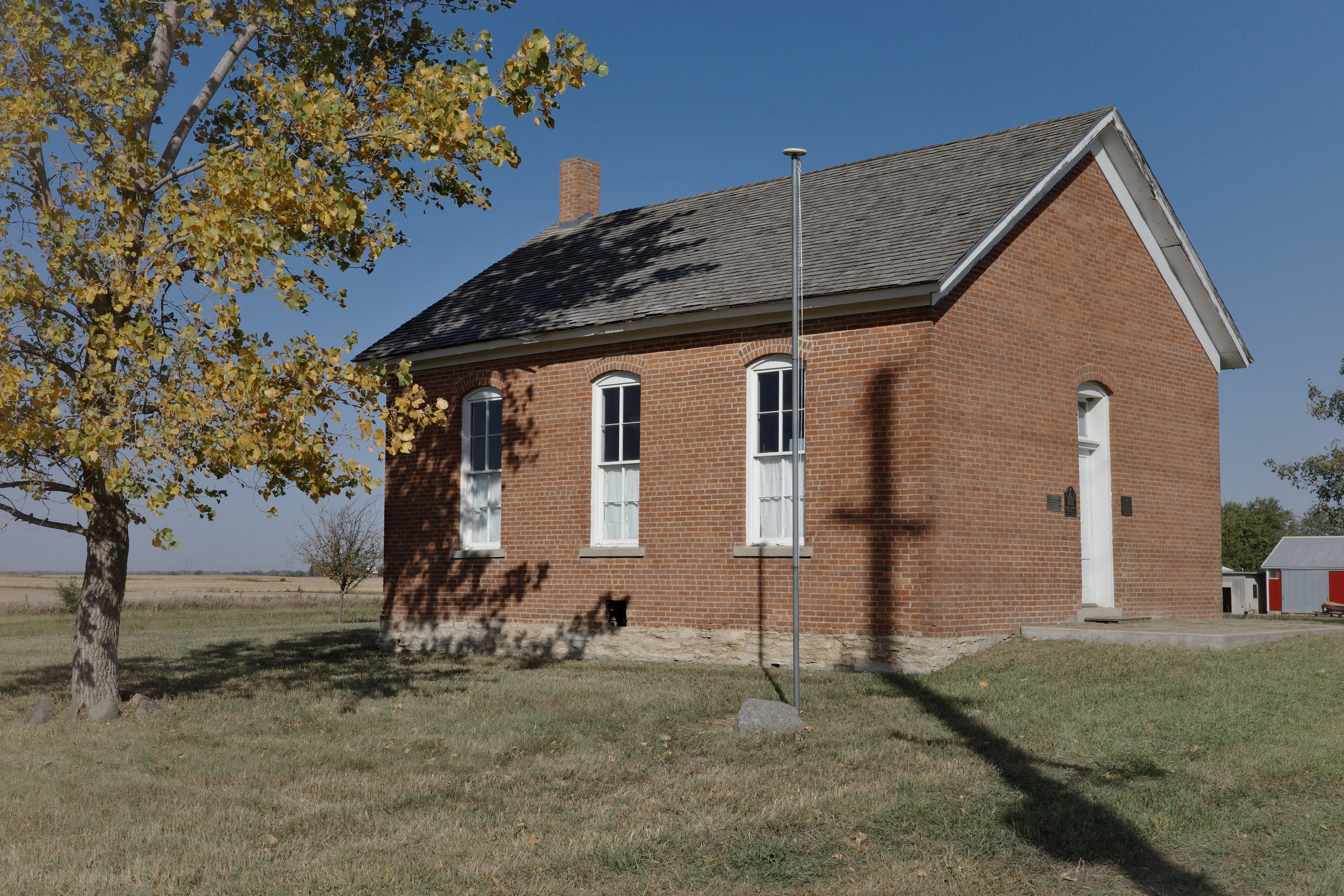
- Des Moines Township No. 7 in 2024

- Location within Iowa Location within the United States
- Location: 843 R Ave.
- Nearest city: Boone, Iowa
- Coordinates: 42°05′09.5″N 93°50′07.5″W
- Area: Less than one acre
- Built: 1888
- NRHP reference No.: 100004212
- Added to NRHP: July 12, 2019

Des Moines Township No. 7, also known as Cole School, is a historic building located northeast of Boone in rural Boone County, United States. The brick one-room schoolhouse was completed in 1888. The use of brick suggests the people in this area were either people of some wealth or there was a larger population who could draw on a broader base of financial resources. Student records were not kept until the year after the school opened. At that time there were 19 students who were between the ages of 5 and 16. Nellie Harvey was the first teacher, and she and those who came after her worked with the students from first grade to eighth. In addition to being a schoolhouse, the building also served as a voting place, a community center, and a storm shelter. As the number of farm families in the area diminished the enrollment in the school declined. Educational leaders began to advocate for better educational offerings and improved school buildings. In 1920 the Iowa General Assembly passed laws to improve rural schools. During the Great Depression more families left the farms and the school closed in 1933. Two of the students who attended the school when it opened had sons in the final class of eight students.

After the school closed the building sat empty until it was sold in 1948 to Olive Cole, a former teacher here. In the following years, it was used to house livestock and farm equipment. Later, the Daughters of the American Revolution acquired the building and turned it into a museum. It was listed on the National Register of Historic Places in 2019.
