= Rainbow Arch Bridge (Valley City, North Dakota) =

- Formerly listed on the U.S. National Register of Historic Places
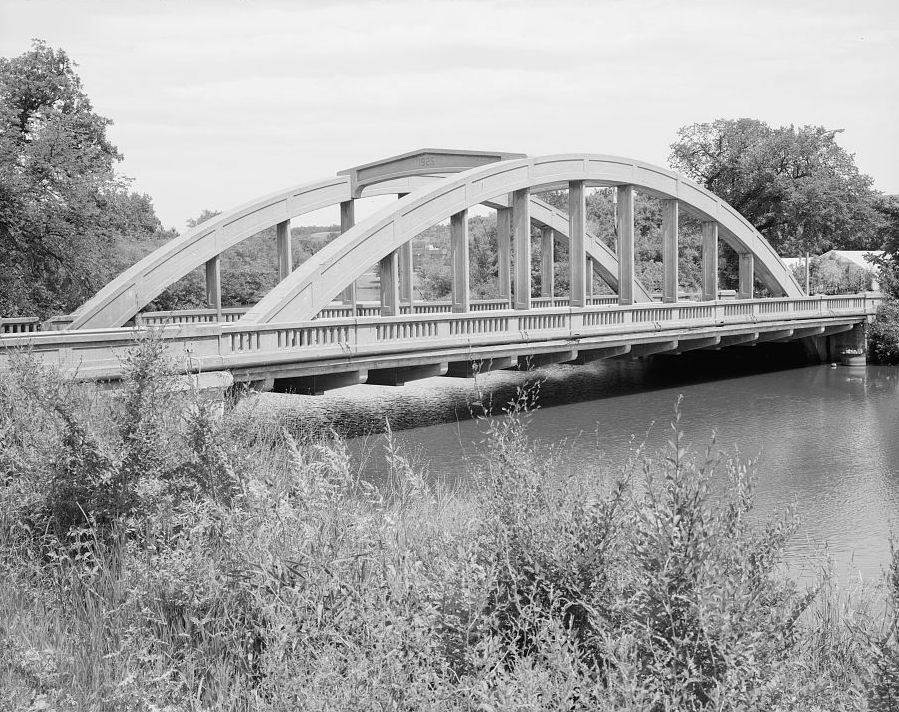

- Location within North Dakota Location within the United States
- Location: I-94 BL (Main Street East), across the Sheyenne River, Valley City, North Dakota
- Coordinates: 46°55′25″N 97°59′29″W
- Area: less than one acre
- Built: 1925
- Built by: Marsh Engineering Company; Minneapolis Bridge Company
- Architectural style: Marsh Rainbow Arch
- MPS: Historic Roadway Bridges of North Dakota MPS
- NRHP reference No.: 97000170

Significant dates
- Added to NRHP: February 27, 1997
- Removed from NRHP: September 23, 2004

The Rainbow Arch Bridge at Valley City, North Dakota, also known as Main Street Bridge, is a Marsh Rainbow Arch structure that was built in 1925. One year later it was designated as part of an overlap with US 10 and US 52, but was replaced by business routes of both roads and later given the additional overlap of Interstate Business Route 94 which gradually replaced the U.S. business routes. It was listed on the National Register of Historic Places on February 27, 1997, but was demolished and replaced in 2004.

It was removed from the National Register in September, 2004. A small park with a memorial to the previous bridge can be found along the sidewalk on the southwest bank of the Sheyenne River.

== See also ==
- List of bridges documented by the Historic American Engineering Record in North Dakota
