= Marsh Concrete Rainbow Arch Bridge =

- U.S. National Register of Historic Places
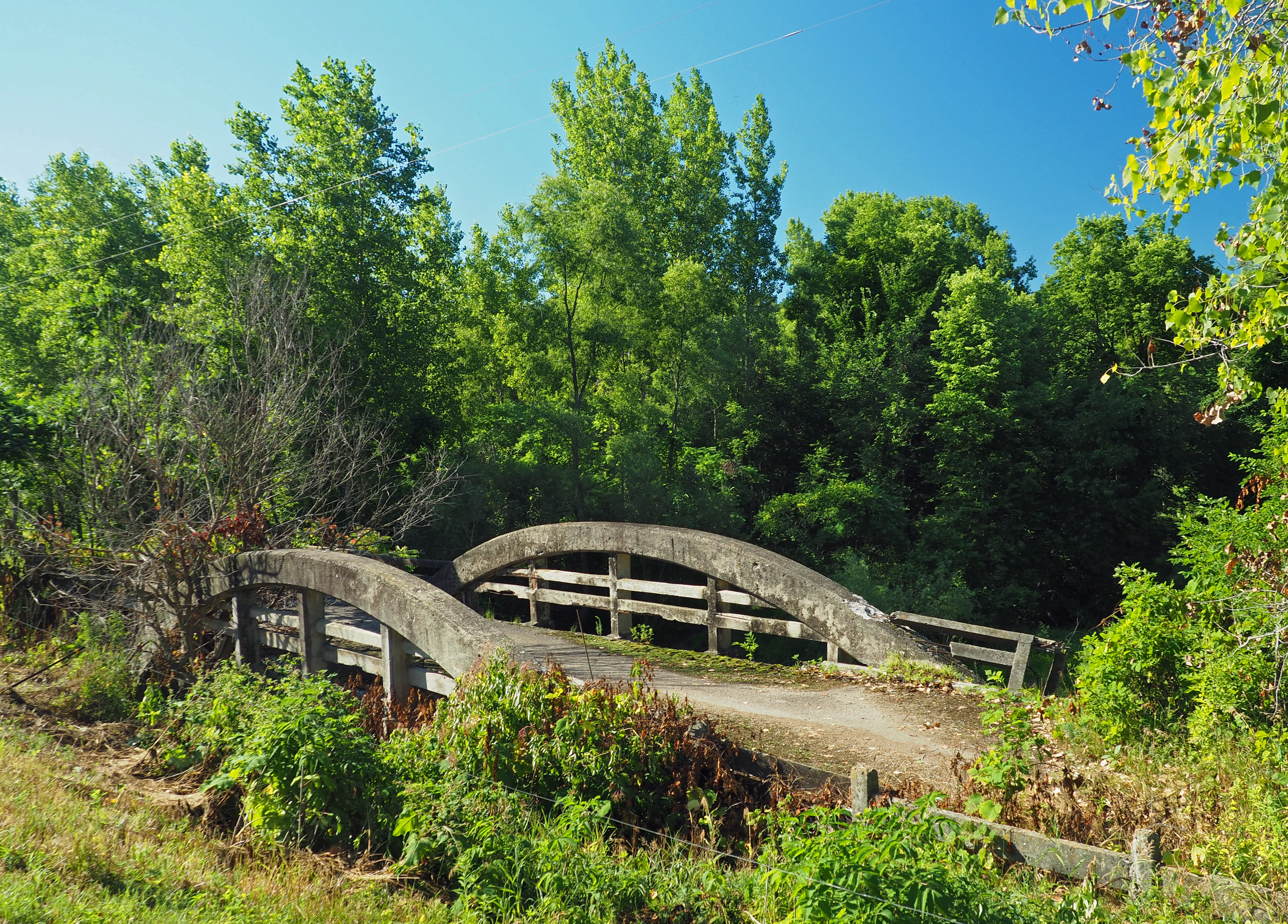
- The Marsh Concrete Rainbow Arch Bridge viewed from the north

- Location within Minnesota Location within the United States
- Nearest city: Courtland, Minnesota
- Coordinates: 44°14′13″N 94°21′39″W
- Area: less than one acre
- Built: 1911
- Architect: Marsh Engineering Co.
- Architectural style: Concrete rainbow arch bridge
- MPS: Blue Earth County MRA
- NRHP reference No.: 80001953
- Added to NRHP: July 28, 1980

Marsh Concrete Rainbow Arch Bridge is a reinforced concrete through arch bridge over the Little Cottonwood River in Cambria Township, Minnesota, United States. The bridge is listed on the National Register of Historic Places. The bridge no longer carries traffic, which has since been shifted to another bridge to the east.

The bridge was designed by James Barney Marsh and built in 1911, the same year he filed a patent for his rainbow arch design. The structure features two arched ribs, one on each side of the roadway, rising above the deck. The deck is suspended from the arches by vertical risers. To drivers, the visible arch crowns on each side resemble those of a pony truss bridge. The Little Cottonwood River crossing is among the oldest Marsh rainbow arch bridges in the United States. As traffic volumes increased and farm machinery became larger, many of Marsh’s rainbow arch bridges became obsolete because they could not be widened. Only about half a dozen Marsh rainbow arch bridges remain in Minnesota.
