= Beaver Creek Bridge (Ogden, Iowa) =

- U.S. National Register of Historic Places
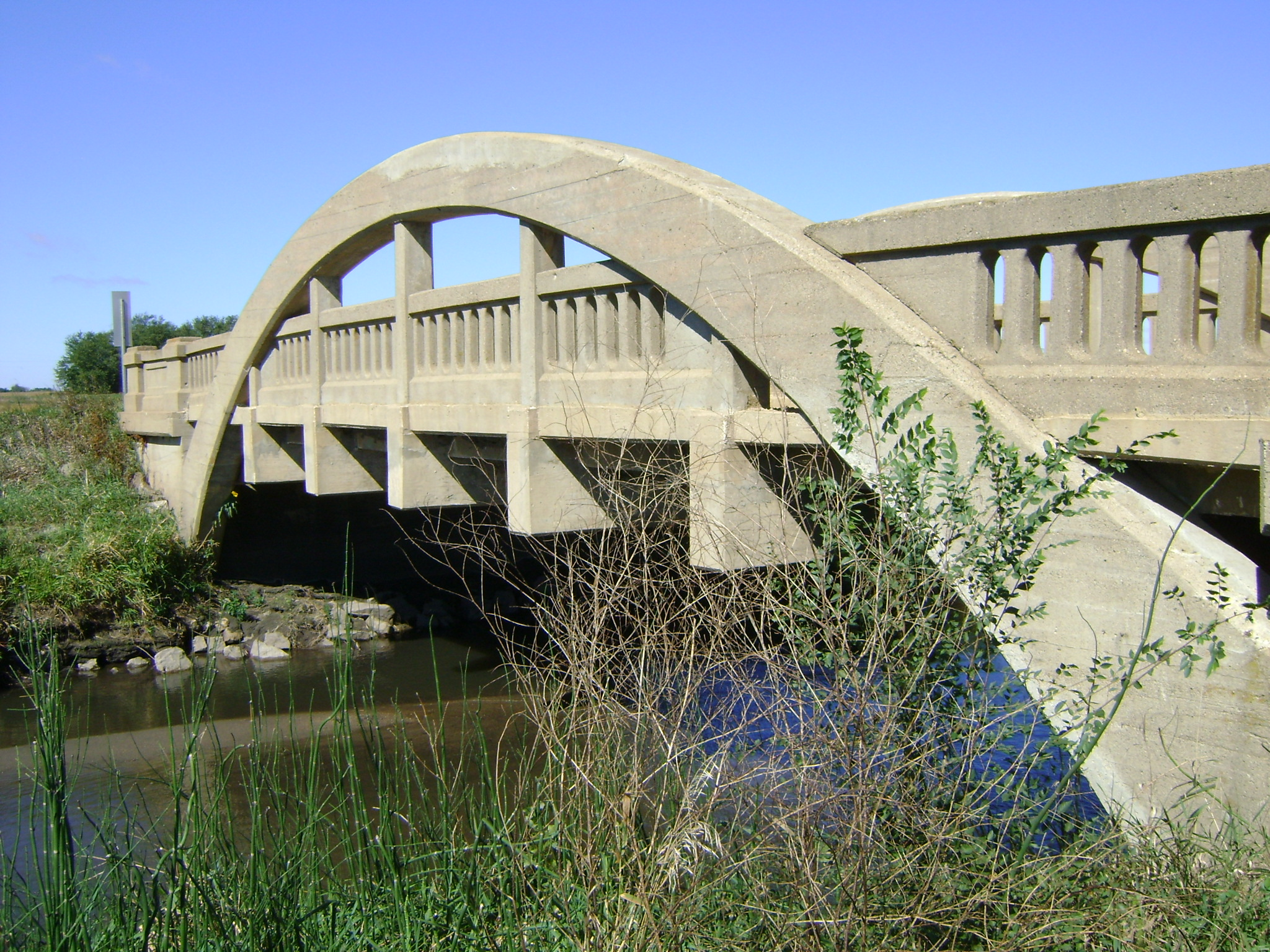

- Location within Iowa Location within the United States
- Location: 210th St. over Beaver Creek
- Nearest city: Ogden, Iowa
- Coordinates: 42°02′57″N 94°08′31″W
- Area: less than one acre
- Built: 1919
- Built by: N.E. Marsh & Son Construction Company
- Architect: James B. Marsh
- Architectural style: Marsh arch bridge
- MPS: Highway Bridges of Iowa MPS
- NRHP reference No.: 98000762
- Added to NRHP: June 25, 1998

Beaver Creek Bridge is located northwest of Ogden, Iowa, United States. It spans Beaver Creek for 52 feet (16 m). The Marsh arch bridge was designed by Des Moines engineer James B. Marsh, and built by the N.E. Marsh & Son Construction Company of Des Moines in 1919. After it was completed it carried traffic on the Lincoln Highway. The bridge was listed on the National Register of Historic Places in 1998.
