= Alonzo J. and Flora Barkley House =

Historic house in Iowa, United States

- U.S. National Register of Historic Places
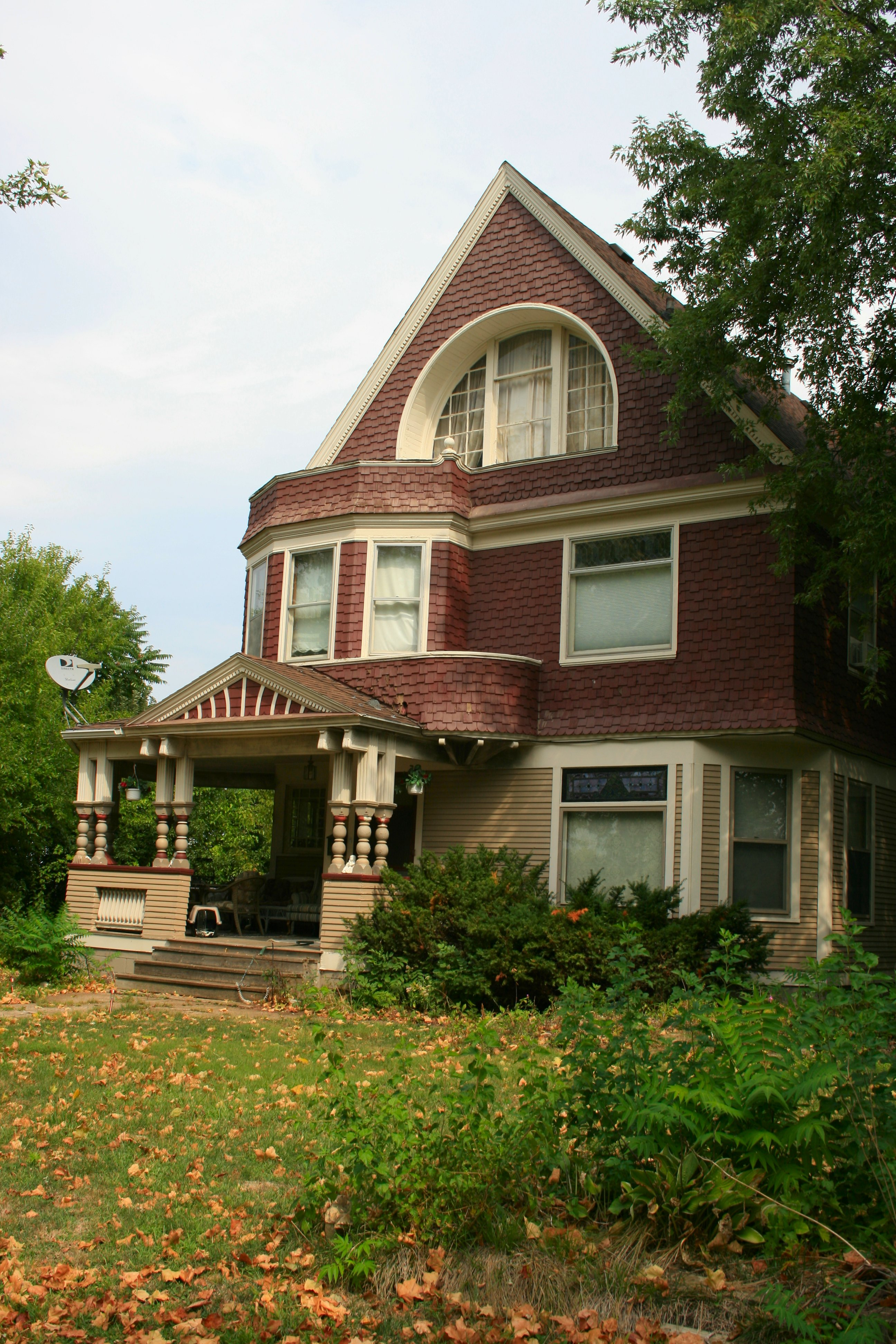

- Location within Iowa Location within the United States
- Location: 326 Boone St. Boone, Iowa
- Coordinates: 42°03′33″N 93°52′54″W
- Area: Less than one acre
- Built: 1893
- Architectural style: Queen Anne
- NRHP reference No.: 95000857
- Added to NRHP: July 21, 1995

The Alonzo J. and Flora Barkley House is a historic building located in Boone, Iowa, United States. Alonzo J. Barkley was a local banker who was involved in real estate and local politics. His first wife, Henrietta Trickey, died in 1889. He married Flora Spencer two years later. He had this house built in 1893. It is a two-story frame Queen Anne with Shingle style influences. The Shingle style, along with the Eastlake and Stick styles, were rare in central Iowa. Typical of the Queen Anne style, the house features an asymmetrical plan with steeply pitched irregular roof forms. The upper two-thirds of the house is covered in shingles. It was listed on the National Register of Historic Places in 1995.
