= Carl and Ulrika Dalander Cassel House =

Historic house in Iowa, United States

- U.S. National Register of Historic Places
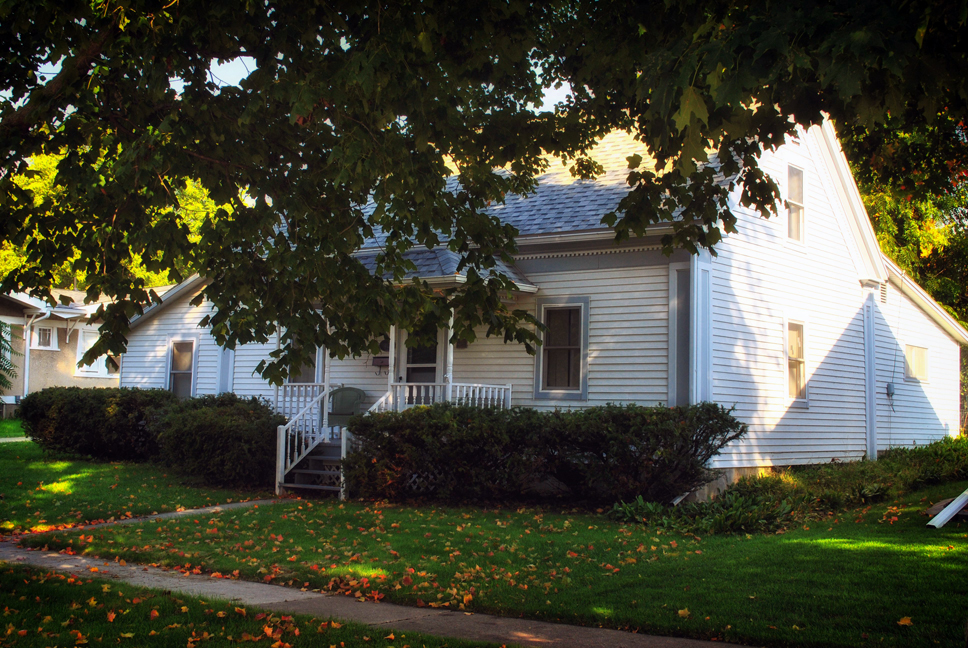

- Location within Iowa Location within the United States
- Location: 415 W. 2nd St. Madrid, Iowa
- Coordinates: 41°52′32″N 93°49′31″W
- Area: Less than one acre
- Built: 1862
- Architectural style: Greek Revival
- NRHP reference No.: 82002609
- Added to NRHP: September 8, 1994

The Carl and Ulrika Dalander Cassel House is a historic residence located in Madrid, Iowa, United States. This Greek Revival structure is believed to be the oldest frame house in town. Built in 1862, it is associated with Swedish settlement in Iowa. Carl Cassel came with his father and the first group of immigrants to the Iowa Territory in 1845. They settled in a place they called Swede Point. Anna Dalander led another group of immigrants the following year and intended to settle in the same place, but they took the wrong river and ended up in Boone County. They named their settlement Swede Point, which was later renamed Madrid. Cassel married Dalander's daughter Ulrika in 1848. He and his brothers-in-law operated a grist mill. He also farmed and was involved in local politics. This house was located on the edge of his farm and the town. Cassel probably lived here until his death in 1902. The house was listed on the National Register of Historic Places in 1994.
