= Mederville, Iowa =

- Unincorporated community
- Location within Iowa Location within the United States
- Country: United States
- State: Iowa
- County: Clayton
- Elevation: 794 ft (242 m)
- Time zone: UTC-6 (Central (CST))
  - Summer (DST): UTC-5 (CDT)
- Area code: 563
- GNIS feature ID: 458944

Mederville is an unincorporated community in Clayton County, Iowa, United States.

== History ==
Mederville is named for one of its founders, Henry Meder. Mederville's population was 48 in 1902, and 78 in 1925. The population was 50 in 1940.

== Education ==
Central Community School District of Elkader operates public schools serving the community.
