= Cedar Creek Bridge (Elgin, Kansas) =

- U.S. National Register of Historic Places
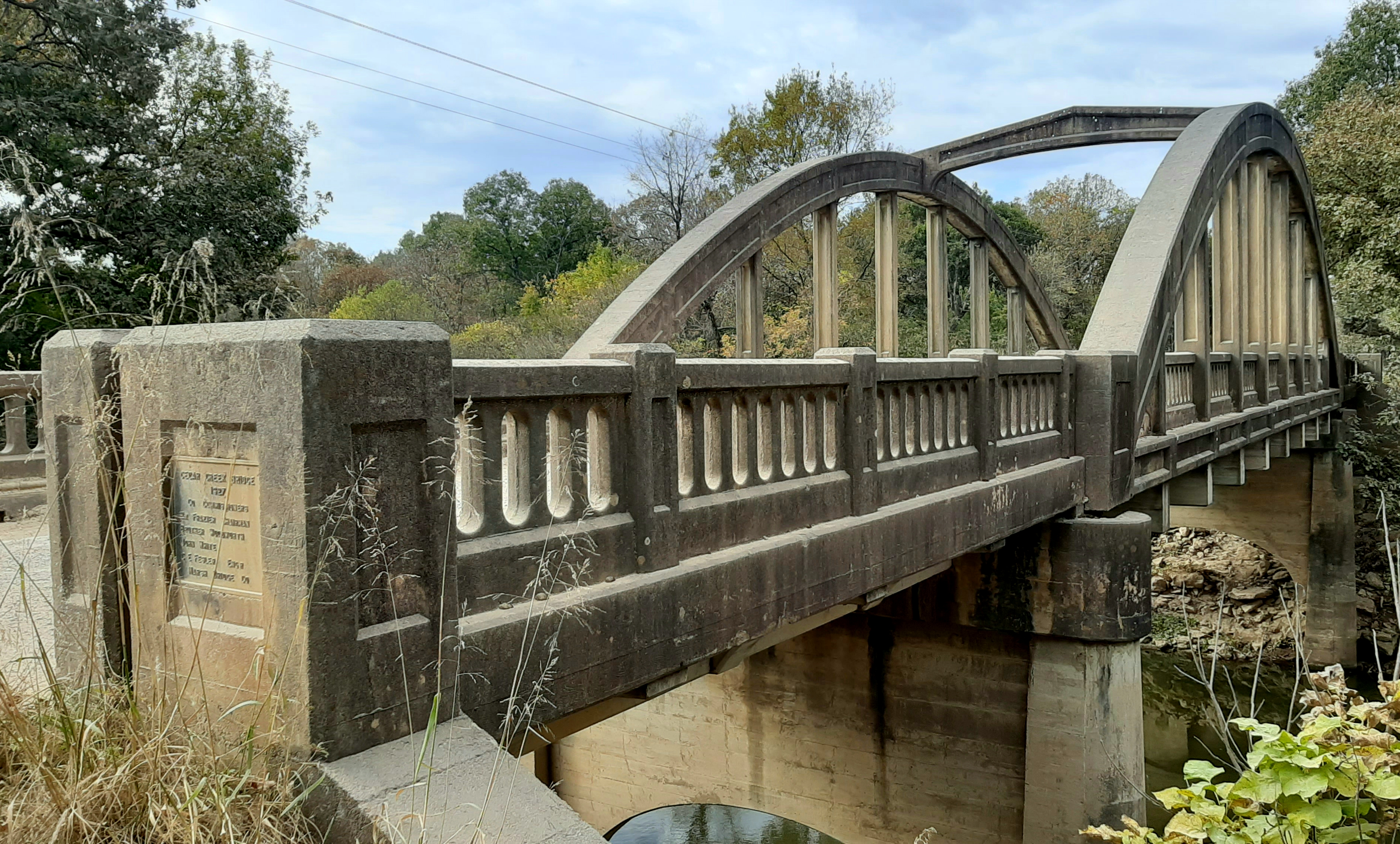

- Location within Kansas Location within the United States
- Nearest city: Elgin, Kansas
- Coordinates: 37°00′34″N 96°15′20″W
- Area: 0.5 acres (0.20 ha)
- Built: 1927
- Engineer: James Barney Marsh
- MPS: Rainbow Arch Marsh Arch Bridges of Kansas TR
- NRHP reference No.: 83000418
- Added to NRHP: March 10, 1983

The Cedar Creek Bridge near Elgin, Kansas, on FAS 96, was built in 1927. Also known as Elgin Cedar Creek Bridge, it was listed on the National Register of Historic Places in 1983.

It is a single span reinforced concrete rainbow arch bridge. It is 82 feet (25 m) long, not including 30 feet (9.1 m) approach decks on each end. It carries a 20 feet (6.1 m) wide roadway. The rainbow arch, also known as Marsh arch, was a design of James Barney Marsh.
