= James Barney Marsh =

- Born: April 12, 1856; North Lake, Wisconsin, US
- Died: June 26, 1936 (aged 80)
- Education: Iowa State University
- Occupation: Bridge designer
- Organizations: Marsh Engineering Company
- Known for: Rainbow arch bridges

Patent image for Marsh's Reinforced Arch Bridge

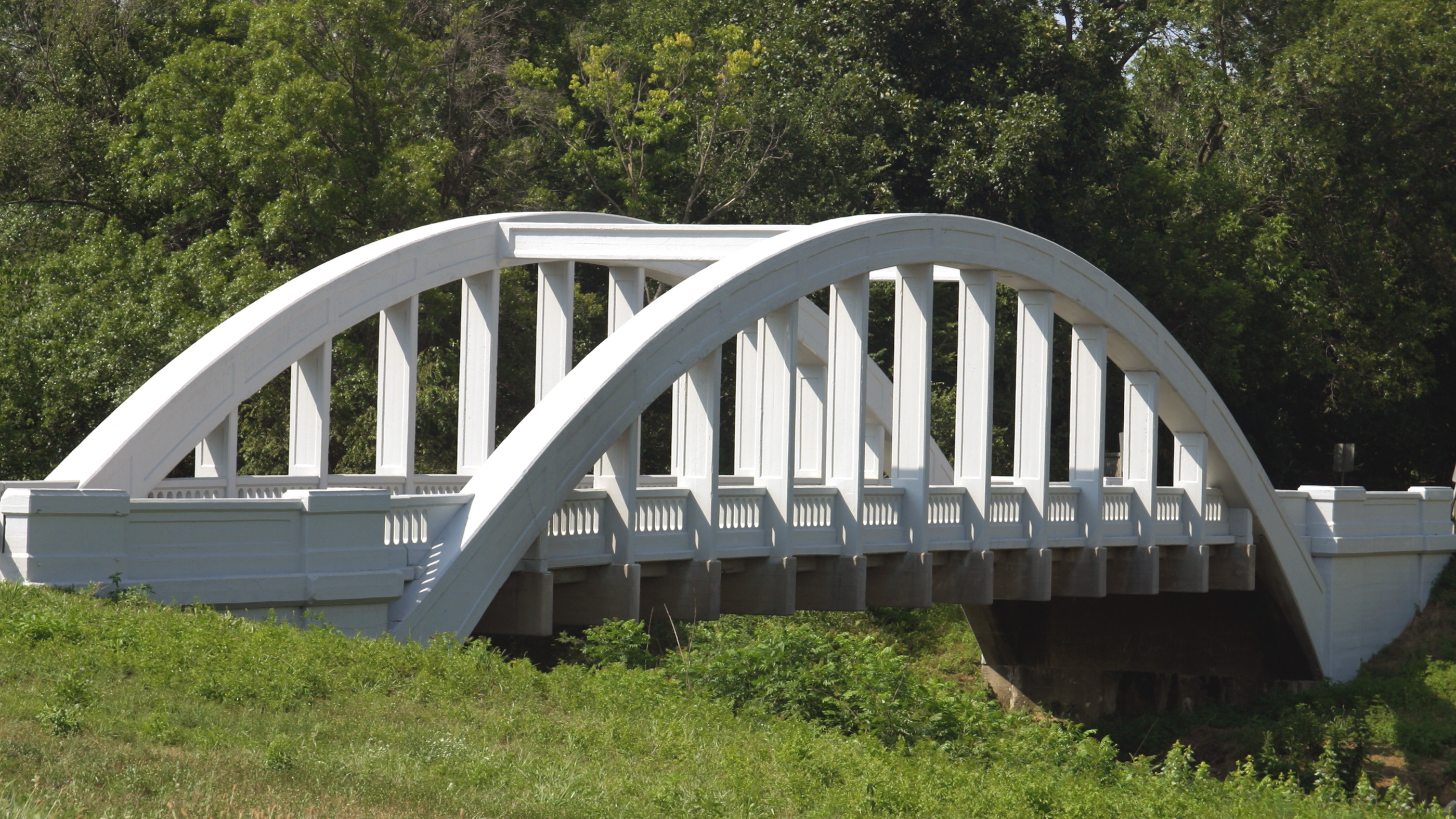
Brush Creek Bridge

James Barney Marsh (April 12, 1856 – June 26, 1936) was an American engineer and bridge designer. He patented a new design for arch bridges. Marsh gave Archie Alexander, the first African-American to graduate as an engineer from Iowa State University, his first job. Marsh worked in the bridge building business for over 50 years, and several of his bridges are listed in the National Register of Historic Places.

== Personal life and early career ==
Marsh was born on April 12, 1856, in North Lake, Wisconsin. He moved to Iowa sometime around 1877, later enrolling at Iowa State University, and he received a Bachelor of Mechanical Engineering in 1882. Within the next year, he traveled to Des Moines, Iowa, to work as a contracting agent for the King Bridge Company of Cleveland, Ohio. He married and had three children.

== Later career ==
Marsh was the representative of King Bridge Company in 1883 and the Kansas City Bridge and Iron Company in 1886. In 1889, Marsh became the western general agent for the King Bridge Company. Marsh had already had many bridges completed in Iowa, including a three-mile railroad structure in Sioux City and three bridges in Des Moines. His other bridges were in Montana, South Dakota, Minnesota, and Colorado. He became an independent bridge designer and contractor in 1896, but he still had his prior contacts with bridge companies to receive materials. Within a few years after the introduction of a new type of bridge construction involving reinforced concrete, Marsh worked on applying reinforced concrete to urban bridges. In 1901, he was an engineer of a Melan arch bridge in Waterloo, Iowa, which finished construction in 1903. Marsh wrote about reinforced concrete girder bridges, which were published in works by the International Engineering Congress in St. Louis in 1904.

Throughout the first decade of the 1900s, Marsh built more bridges that were made out of reinforced concrete and steel. His company was named the Marsh Bridge Company, and it provided bridges to cities and rural areas. The bridges included a reinforced concrete wagon bridge in Greene County and Melan bridge in Cedar Rapids. In the beginning of 1909, the Marsh Bridge Company was taken over by someone else, and the Marsh Engineering Company was started soon after. In May 1909, a Melan arch bridge in Peoria, Illinois collapsed and Engineering News said that the collapse was "the largest recorded failure of a reinforced-concrete bridge". The bridge collapse was likely caused by someone removing protective sheet piling without authorization. In November 1909, Marsh's new company finished building an arch bridge in Dunkerton, Iowa.

The Melan bridges that were built by Marsh and others required royalties to be paid to the American holders of the patent. The added cost of paying royalties made the cost of building such bridges with reinforced concrete very high. Marsh did not want to pay the royalties, so he built his own design for a reinforced concrete highway bridge, which later became known as the Marsh Rainbow Arch. His rainbow arch bridges were designed to be built without any supporting scaffolding. On August 12, 1912, Marsh received a patent for the design. The design used less labor, and it used a lesser amount of concrete. Steel that would be used for reinforcing bridges was cheap. Marsh's patented work allowed rural townships to have bridges that resembled the ones used over rivers in bigger cities. The patent was described as being "to construct an arch bridge of reinforced concrete in such a manner as to permit a limited amount of expansion and contraction both of the arches and of the floor".

Marsh continued to building rainbow arches and other types of reinforced concrete arch bridges. Possibly the largest rainbow arch bridge that he built was the Cotter Bridge in Arkansas, which was completed in 1930. He collaborated with other engineers to create "Minimum Specifications for Highway Bridges" for the Iowa Engineering Society, which was completed in 1914. Marsh's son, Frank E. Marsh, owned a construction company that often received the contracts for building bridges that were designed by Marsh. Marsh gave Archie Alexander, the first African-American to graduate as an engineer from the University of Iowa, his start. Alexander worked under Marsh for two years and later built his own projects nationwide. Marsh was a bridge builder for over fifty years.

== Death and legacy ==
Several of Marsh's bridges remain and are listed in the National Register of Historic Places (NRHP). Marsh died on June 26, 1936.

== Works ==
Notable works include:

=== Iowa ===
All Iowa works are NRHP-listed.

- Beaver Creek Bridge, M Avenue over Beaver Creek, Perry
- Beaver Creek Bridge, 210th Street over Beaver Creek, Ogden
- Big Creek Bridge 2, 2130 320th Street over Big Creek, Madrid
- Court Avenue Bridge, Court Avenue over Des Moines River, Des Moines
- Des Moines River Bridge, CR P14 over East Fork of Des Moines River, Swea City
- Marsh Rainbow Arch Bridge, Highway N37 over North Raccoon River, Lake City
- Rockwell City Bridge, 270th Street over unnamed stream, Rockwell City
- Squaw Creek Bridge, 120th Street and V Avenue over Squaw Creek, Ridgeport
- Squaw Creek Bridge 2, 110th Street and V Avenue over Squaw Creek, Ridgeport

=== Kansas ===
- Blacksmith Creek Bridge, west of Topeka, NRHP-listed
- Brush Creek Bridge, north of Baxter Springs, NRHP-listed
- Cedar Creek Bridge, FAS 96, Elgin, NRHP-listed
- Conroe Bridge, east of Junction City, NRHP-listed
- Creamery Bridge, Osawatomie, NRHP-listed
- Dewlen-Spohnhauer Bridge, Old US 160, Independence, NRHP-listed
- John Mack Bridge, South Broadway across the Big Arkansas River, Wichita, NRHP-listed
- Mine Creek Bridge, east of Mound City, NRHP-listed
- Neosho River Bridge, east of Hartford, NRHP-listed
- Pottawatomie Creek Bridge, Osawatomie, NRHP-listed
- Soden's Grove Bridge, K-57/99, Emporia, NRHP-listed

=== Elsewhere ===
- Bladensburg Concrete Bowstring Bridge, SR 541 over Wakatomika Creek, Bladensburg, Ohio, documented by HAER
- Cotter Bridge, US 62 BUS over the White River in Cotter, Arkansas.
- Miller Ree Creek Bridge, west edge of Miller, South Dakota, NRHP-listed
- Marsh Rainbow Arch Bridge, Spring Street, Chippewa Falls, Wisconsin, NRHP-listed
- Marsh Concrete Rainbow Arch Bridge, Cambria Township, Minnesota, NRHP-listed

== See also ==
- Brush Creek Bridge – Last Marsh arch bridge on Route 66
