= Marsh Rainbow Arch Bridge (Lake City, Iowa) =

- U.S. National Register of Historic Places
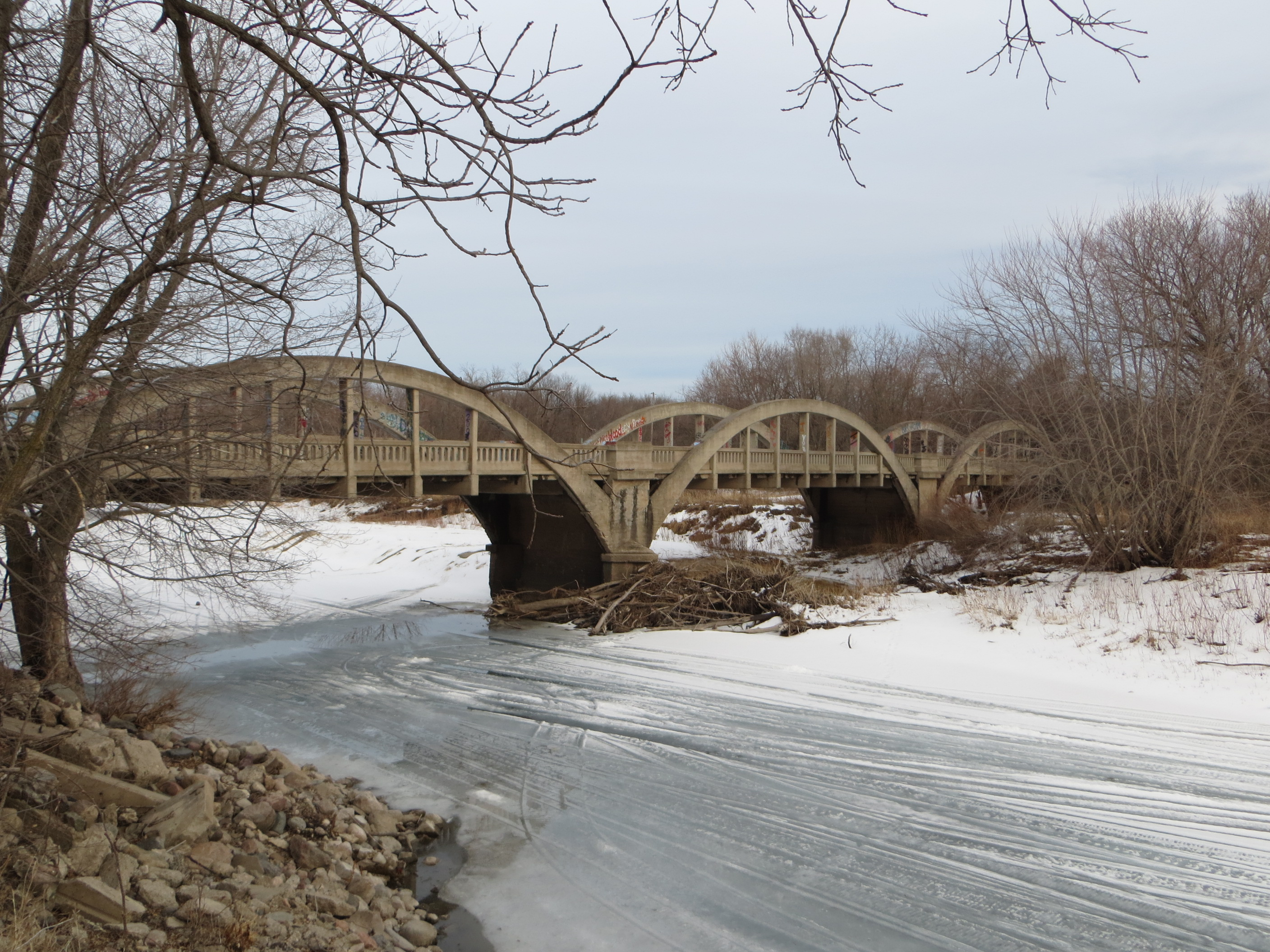

- Location within Iowa Location within the United States
- Location: Highway N37 over the North Raccoon River
- Nearest city: Lake City, Iowa
- Coordinates: 42°13′46″N 94°45′17″W
- Area: less than one acre
- Built: 1914
- Built by: Iowa Bridge Company
- Architect: James Barney Marsh
- Architectural style: Marsh arch
- MPS: Highway Bridges of Iowa MPS
- NRHP reference No.: 88002529
- Added to NRHP: March 30, 1989

The Marsh Rainbow Arch Bridge, also known as the Coon River Bridge and Rainbow Bend Access, is located south of Lake City, Iowa, United States. The 271-foot (83 m) three-span bridge carried traffic on Iberia Avenue over the North Raccoon River. It was designed by Des Moines engineer James Barney Marsh in his patented rainbow arch configuration, and constructed by the Iowa Bridge Company in 1914 for $10,970. It replaced a Howe truss bridge that had been built by the King Bridge Company of Cleveland. That bridge was put in service upstream and remained in use until 1983 when it was taken down. The Marsh arch bridge was bypassed in 1985, and remains in place in a county park. It was listed on the National Register of Historic Places in 1989.

A model of the Marsh Rainbow Arch Bridge is included in The Big Treehouse, a campground tourist attraction.

== See also ==
- List of bridges documented by the Historic American Engineering Record in Iowa
