= Stoll Bottling Works =

- Stoll Building Works
- U.S. National Register of Historic Places
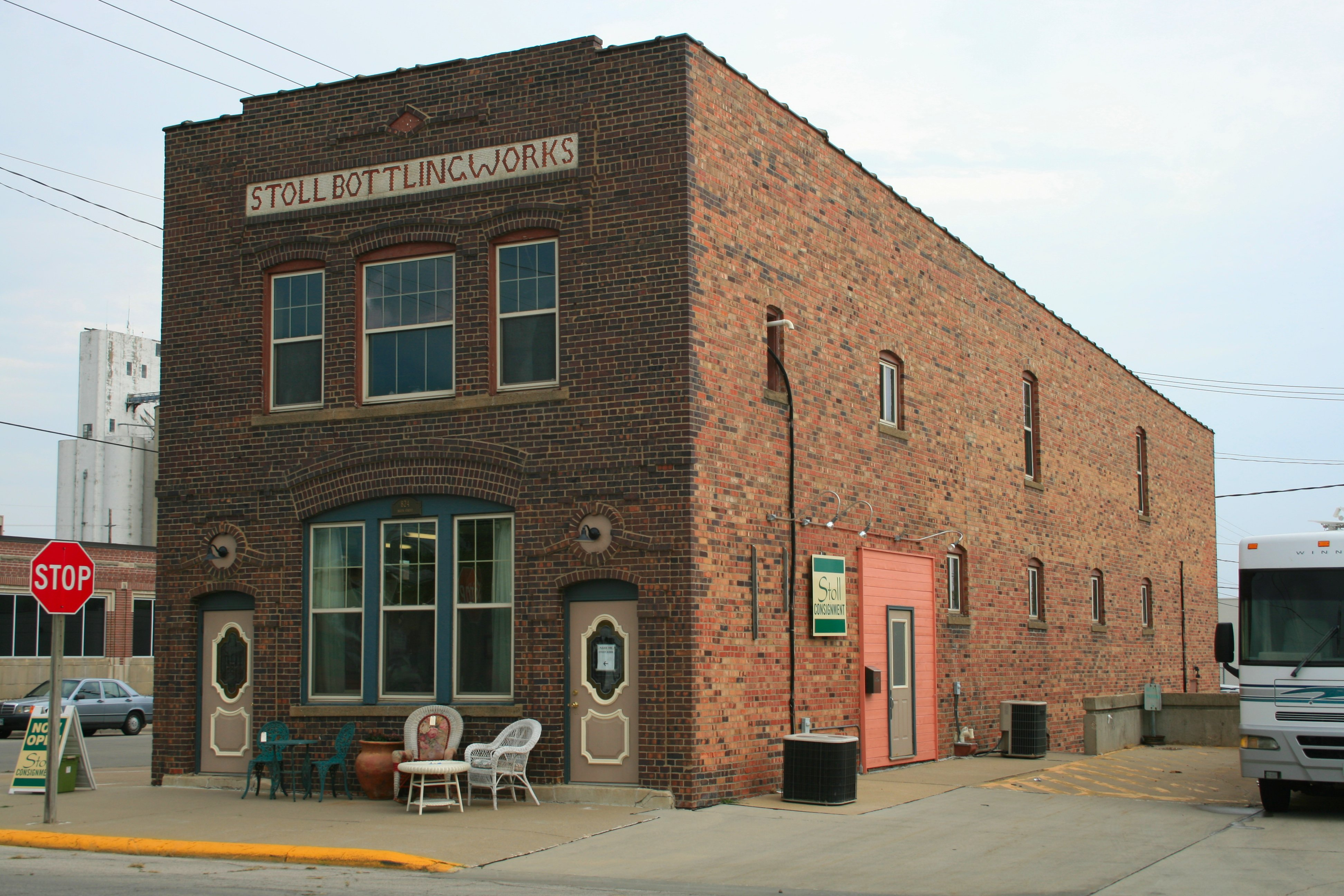

- Location within Iowa Location within the United States
- Location: 824 Allen St. Boone, Iowa
- Coordinates: 42°03′53″N 93°52′43″W
- Area: Less than one acre
- Built: 1913-1914
- NRHP reference No.: 97000390
- Added to NRHP: May 2, 1997

The Stoll Bottling Works is a historic building located in Boone, Iowa, United States. The 135 by 82 feet (41 by 25 m) brick building was built between 1913 and 1914. It was one of the buildings in town that housed a plant for producing and bottling carbonated soft drinks, a significant industry in Boone. Louis Stoll had begun working at the Seiling Soda Company when he was a teenager. He bought the company in 1912 when he was 21. Four years later his former supervisor at Seiling, Frank Linderblood, bought the company and Stoll moved to Des Moines where he owned Capitol City Bottling Works. By the mid-20th century the national brands had plants in Boone. This building was listed on the National Register of Historic Places in 1989. It mistakenly lists this building as the Stoll Building Works while the official paperwork mentioned in the second reference has the correct name.
