= First National Bank (Boone, Iowa) =

- U.S. National Register of Historic Places
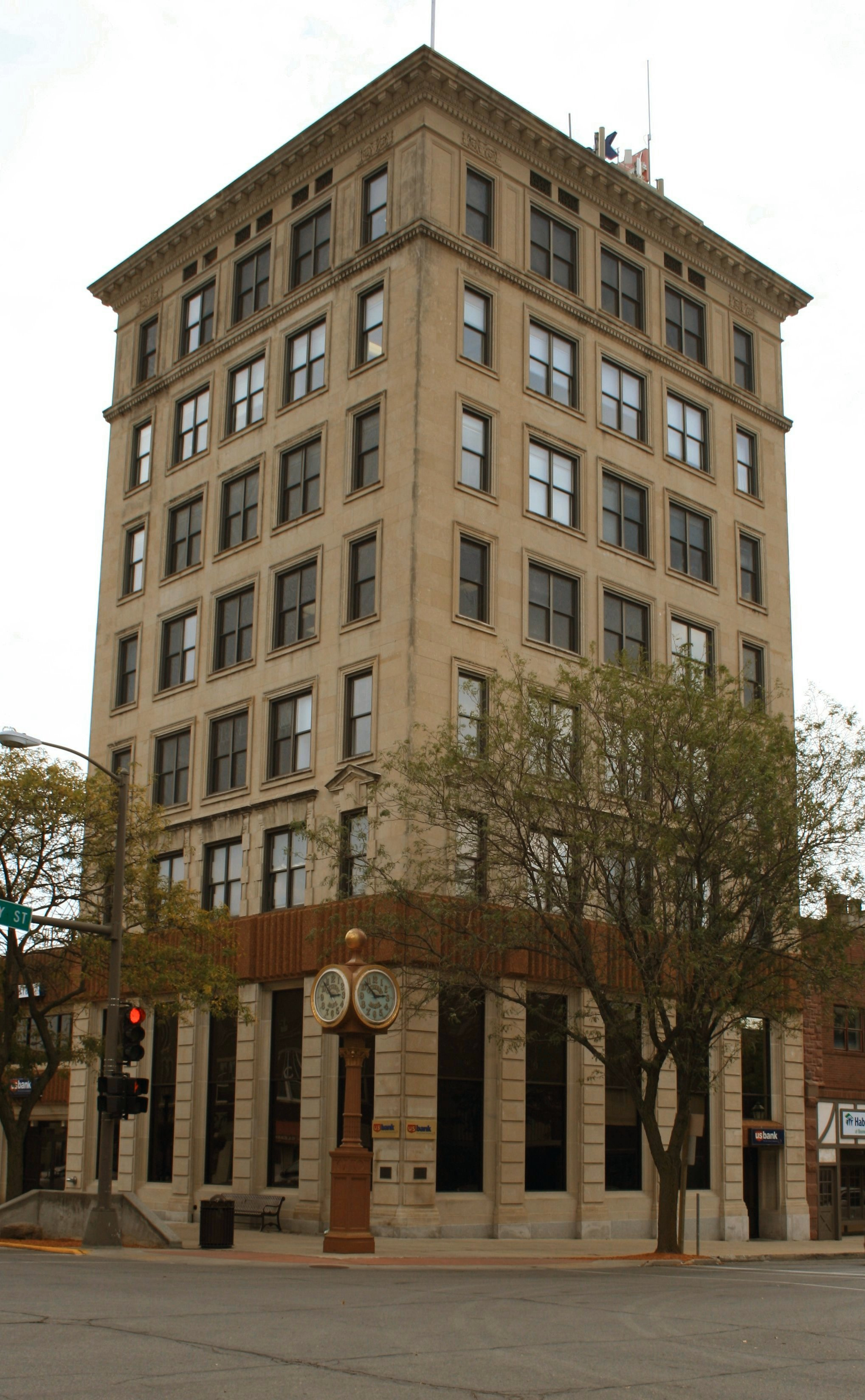

- Location within Iowa Location within the United States
- Location: 8th and Story Sts. Boone, Iowa
- Coordinates: 42°03′47″N 93°52′58″W
- Area: Less than one acre
- Built: 1915-1916
- Built by: T.C. Wardell
- Architect: Proudfoot, Bird & Rawson
- Architectural style: Classical Revival
- MPS: Architectural Legacy of Proudfoot & Bird in Iowa MPS
- NRHP reference No.: 88003232
- Added to NRHP: June 28, 1989

First National Bank, now known as US Bank, is located in Boone, Iowa, United States. The bank was established in 1884, and their building at this location was destroyed in a fire in 1914. The eight-story bank and office building that replaced it is the work of the Des Moines architectural firm of Proudfoot, Bird & Rawson. T.C. Wardell from Chicago was hired as superintendent of construction because he was considered a specialist in constructing fire-proof buildings. Construction began in 1915, and the building was completed in 1916 for $115,000.

The architecture combines the styling of the Neoclassical style with the form and construction technology of the Chicago Commercial School. The bank was acquired by Citizen's National Bank in 1935, and the building changed names at that time. In the late 1970s a two-story addition was built onto the east side of the original building. A beltcourse of brown aggregate material replaced the original beltcourse at the top of the base to visually tie the two structures together. The building was listed on the National Register of Historic Places in 1989. The bank has subsequently been acquired by US Bank, and the building now uses their name.
