= Harrison Township, Boone County, Iowa =

Township in Iowa, US

Harrison Township, Boone County
- Township
- Coordinates: 42°10′02″N 093°45′24″W
- Country: United States
- State: Iowa
- County: Boone

Area
  - Total: 35.97 sq mi (93.15 km^{2})
  - Land: 35.94 sq mi (93.09 km^{2})
  - Water: 0.027 sq mi (0.07 km^{2})
- Elevation: 1,004 ft (306 m)

Population (2000)
  - Total: 368
  - Density: 10/sq mi (4/km^{2})
- FIPS code: 19-91860
- GNIS feature ID: 0468011

Harrison Township is one of seventeen townships in Boone County, Iowa, United States. As of the 2000 census, its population was 368.

== History ==
Harrison Township was organized in 1871. It is named for William Henry Harrison, ninth President of the United States.

== Geography ==
Harrison Township covers an area of 35.97 square miles (93.2 km^{2}) and contains no incorporated settlements. According to the USGS, it contains three cemeteries: Mackey, Saint Paul's Lutheran and Saints Peter and Paul.
