= Ioway Creek (Ames, Iowa) =

Stream in Iowa, U.S.

Ioway Creek is a 41.5-mile-long (66.8 km) tributary of the South Skunk River in central Iowa in the United States. It flows into the South Skunk in the southern part the city of Ames near 42°00′40″N 93°35′46″W.

Originally named Squaw Creek, after an ethnic slur used to refer to an Indigenous woman, it was officially renamed by the U.S. Board on Geographic Names on February 11, 2021.

== See also ==
- List of Iowa rivers
