= Big Creek Bridge 2 =

- U.S. National Register of Historic Places
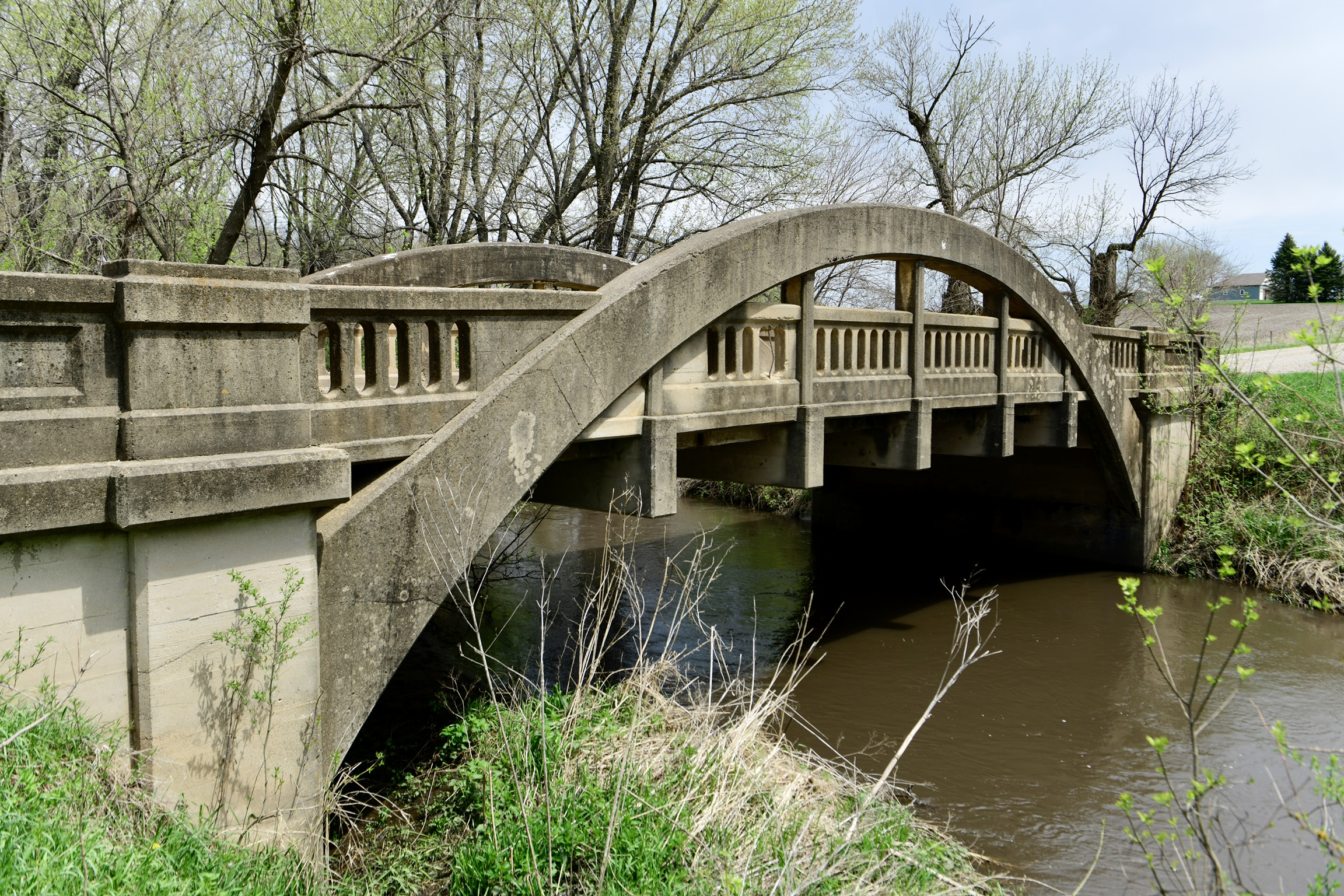

- Location within Iowa Location within the United States
- Location: 2130 320th St. over Beaver Creek
- Nearest city: Madrid, Iowa
- Coordinates: 41°53′33″N 93°45′01″W
- Area: less than one acre
- Built: 1917
- Built by: N.E. Marsh & Son Construction Company
- Architect: James B. Marsh
- Architectural style: Marsh arch bridge
- MPS: Highway Bridges of Iowa MPS
- NRHP reference No.: 98000767
- Added to NRHP: June 25, 1998

Big Creek Bridge 2 is located northeast of Madrid, Iowa, United States. It spans Big Creek for 53 feet (16 m). The Marsh arch bridge was designed by Des Moines engineer James B. Marsh in February 1917. The contract to build the structure was awarded in April of the same year to the N.E. Marsh & Son Construction Company of Des Moines for $3,170. It was completed later in 1917. The bridge was listed on the National Register of Historic Places in 1998.
