= Ridgeport, Iowa =

- Unincorporated community
- Location within Iowa
- Coordinates: 42°10′37″N 93°55′03″W
- Country: United States
- State: Iowa
- County: Boone
- Elevation: 1,207 ft (368 m)
- Time zone: UTC-6 (Central (CST))
  - Summer (DST): UTC-5 (CDT)
- Area code: 515
- GNIS feature ID: 460628

Ridgeport is an unincorporated community in Boone County, in the U.S. state of Iowa. An old variant name was "Mineral Ridge".

== History ==
Ridgeport was originally called "Mineral Ridge", and under the latter name was platted in 1854, taking its name from the ridge upon which the town site is situated. A post office called Mineral Ridge was established in 1854, and remained in operation until 1913.
