= Herrold =

Herrold is a surname of Anglo-Saxon origin, meaning "love of the army". Notable people with the surname include:

- Charles Herrold (1875-1948), American inventor and pioneer radio broadcaster
- Maurice Herrold (1869-1949), New Zealand rugby union player
- Myha'la Herrold (born 1996), American actress

== See also ==
- Herrold, Iowa, an unincorporated community
- Herrold Bridge, a historic bridge near Herrold, Iowa
- Herrold Run, a tributary of the Susquehanna river in Pennsylvania
- Herold (surname)
- Harrold (surname)
