= Berkley, Iowa =

- City
- Location of Berkley, Iowa
- Coordinates: 41°56′47″N 94°06′49″W
- Country: US
- State: Iowa
- County: Boone
- Township: Union

Area
  - Total: 0.20 sq mi (0.52 km^{2})
  - Land: 0.20 sq mi (0.52 km^{2})
  - Water: 0 sq mi (0.00 km^{2})
- Elevation: 981 ft (299 m)

Population (2020)
  - Total: 23
  - Density: 114.3/sq mi (44.13/km^{2})
- Time zone: UTC-6 (Central (CST))
  - Summer (DST): UTC-5 (CDT)
- ZIP code: 50220
- Area code: 515
- FIPS code: 19-06040
- GNIS feature ID: 2394146

Berkley is a city in Union Township, Boone County, Iowa, United States. The population was 23 at the 2020 census, down 4.2% from 24 in 2000.

== History ==
Berkley was laid out as a town in 1883.

== Geography ==
According to the United States Census Bureau, the city has a total area of 0.21 square miles (0.54 km^{2}), all land. Beaver Creek flows near the town site.

== Demographics ==
Historical populations
| Year | Pop. | ±% |
|---|---|---|
| 1920 | 68 | — |
| 1930 | 82 | +20.6% |
| 1940 | 105 | +28.0% |
| 1950 | 71 | −32.4% |
| 1960 | 58 | −18.3% |
| 1970 | 56 | −3.4% |
| 1980 | 49 | −12.5% |
| 1990 | 39 | −20.4% |
| 2000 | 24 | −38.5% |
| 2010 | 32 | +33.3% |
| 2020 | 23 | −28.1% |
Source:"U.S. Census website". United States Census Bureau. and Iowa Data Center; Source: U.S. Decennial Census

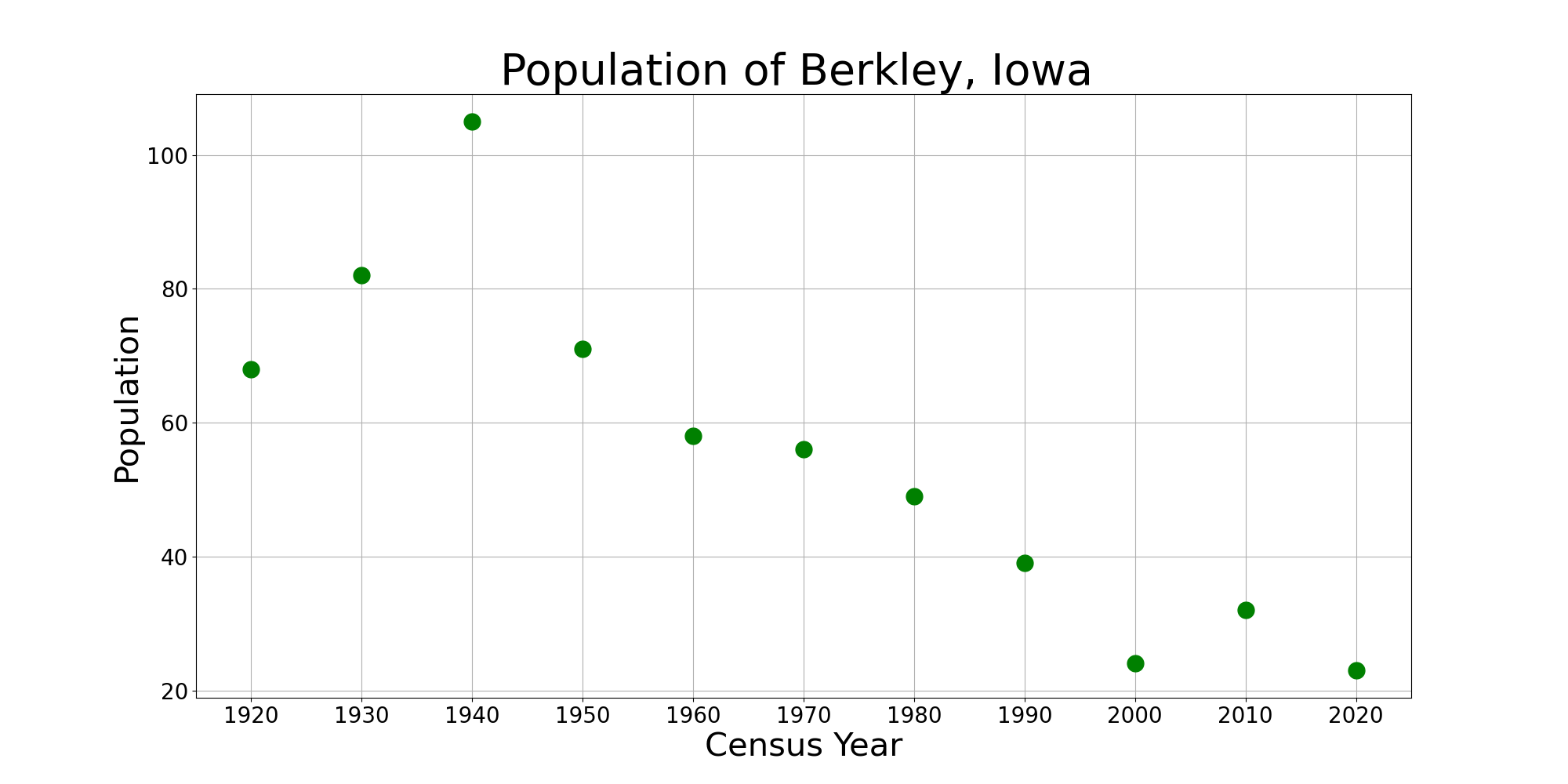
The population of Berkley, Iowa from US census data

=== 2020 census ===
As of the census of 2020, there were 23 people, 11 households, and 6 families residing in the city. The population density was 114.0 inhabitants per square mile (44.0/km^{2}). There were 11 housing units at an average density of 54.5 per square mile (21.0/km^{2}). The racial makeup of the city was 95.7% White, 0.0% Black or African American, 4.3% Native American, 0.0% Asian, 0.0% Pacific Islander, 0.0% from other races and 0.0% from two or more races. Hispanic or Latino of any race comprised 4.3% of the population.

Of the 11 households, 27.3% of which had children under the age of 18 living with them, 36.4% were married couples living together, 36.4% were cohabitating couples, 9.1% had a female householder with no spouse or partner present and 18.2% had a male householder with no spouse or partner present. 45.5% of all households were non-families. 27.3% of all household were made up of individuals, 9.1% had someone living alone who was 65 years old or older.

The median age in the city was 52.5 years. 13.0% of the residents were under the age of 20; 8.7% were between the ages of 20 and 24; 8.7% were from 25 and 44; 52.2% were from 45 and 64; and 17.4% were 65 years of age or older. The gender makeup of the city was 47.8% male and 52.2% female.

=== 2010 census ===
As of the census of 2010, there were 32 people, 11 households, and 9 families living in the city. The population density was 152.4 inhabitants per square mile (58.8/km^{2}). There were 14 housing units at an average density of 66.7 per square mile (25.8/km^{2}). The racial makeup of the city was 96.9% White and 3.1% from other races. Hispanic or Latino of any race were 3.1% of the population.

There were 11 households, of which 36.4% had children under the age of 18 living with them, 45.5% were married couples living together, 9.1% had a female householder with no husband present, 27.3% had a male householder with no wife present, and 18.2% were non-families. 18.2% of all households were made up of individuals, and 9.1% had someone living alone who was 65 years of age or older. The average household size was 2.91 and the average family size was 2.89.

The median age in the city was 42 years. 25% of residents were under the age of 18; 9.3% were between the ages of 18 and 24; 18.9% were from 25 to 44; 28.2% were from 45 to 64; and 18.8% were 65 years of age or older. The gender makeup of the city was 59.4% male and 40.6% female.

=== 2000 census ===
As of the census of 2000, there were 24 people, 11 households, and 8 families living in the city. The population density was 114.6 inhabitants per square mile (44.2/km^{2}). There were 11 housing units at an average density of 52.5 per square mile (20.3/km^{2}). The racial makeup of the city was 100.00% White.

There were 11 households, out of which 9.1% had children under the age of 18 living with them, 54.5% were married couples living together, 27.3% had a female householder with no husband present, and 18.2% were non-families. 18.2% of all households were made up of individuals, and 18.2% had someone living alone who was 65 years of age or older. The average household size was 2.18 and the average family size was 2.33.

In the city, the population was spread out, with 8.3% under the age of 18, 8.3% from 18 to 24, 16.7% from 25 to 44, 20.8% from 45 to 64, and 45.8% who were 65 years of age or older. The median age was 60 years. For every 100 females, there were 71.4 males. For every 100 females age 18 and over, there were 69.2 males.

The median income for a household in the city was $30,000, and the median income for a family was $31,250. Males had a median income of $43,750 versus $14,375 for females. The per capita income for the city was $15,822. There were no families and 11.1% of the population living below the poverty line, including no under eighteens and 21.4% of those over 64.
