= Wilmer A. Reedholm =

Wilmer A. Reedholm (September 14, 1912, in Boxholm, Iowa – August 26, 1994, in Stuart, Florida) was an American aviation pioneer.

In 1926 Reedholm designed and constructed his first airplane, a single-seat craft with a 28 hp engine. It made only one flight, a brief straight-line effort, with the unlicensed youth at the controls.

Reedholm obtained his solo permit at the age of 16, and became the nation's youngest fully licensed pilot at 18. He obtained a Transport Rating.

In 1931 he was mentioned in the Dayton, Ohio newspaper as second-place winner of a local air race.

Reedholm became Vice-president - Flight with American Airlines, retiring in 1972 at the age of 60.

In 2007 Reedholm was posthumously inducted into the Iowa Aviation Hall of Fame.
