= Pilot Mound Township =

Pilot Mound Township may refer to:

- Pilot Mound Township, Boone County, Iowa
- Pilot Mound Township, Fillmore County, Minnesota
- Pilot Mound Township, Griggs County, North Dakota, in Griggs County, North Dakota
