= Zenorsville, Iowa =

- Unincorporated community
- Location within Iowa
- Coordinates: 42°06′26″N 93°43′05″W
- Country: United States
- State: Iowa
- County: Boone
- Elevation: 1,004 ft (306 m)
- Time zone: UTC-6 (Central (CST))
  - Summer (DST): UTC-5 (CDT)
- Area code: 515
- GNIS feature ID: 464813

Zenorsville (or Zenorville) is an unincorporated community in Boone County, in the U.S. state of Iowa.

== Geography ==
Zenorsville is located at 42°06′26″N 93°43′05″W, in the northeastern part of Jackson Township.

== History ==
Zenorsville was founded in Section 12 of Jackson Township after the discovery of coal deposits in the mid-1870s. At its peak, Zenorsville had around 400 residents. The community had a store, school, blacksmith shop, other businesses, and a church.

Several mines in Zenorsville operated. The coal was considered the best in the state, according to a 1909 state geological survey. However, coal mining in Zenorsville was discontinued sometime prior to 1909. An 1886 mining report blamed the decline in coal mining in Zenorsville on a new rail line north from Ames.

The post office at Zenorsville was established in 1876 and was discontinued in 1900.

A 1914 history of Boone County states that when the mines declined, the shanties in Zenorsville were sold and removed, as residents moved elsewhere.

Zenorsville's population was estimated at 300 in 1887, and was 367 in 1902.

== See also ==
- Jordan, Iowa, another community in Jackson Township
