= Beaver, Iowa =

- City
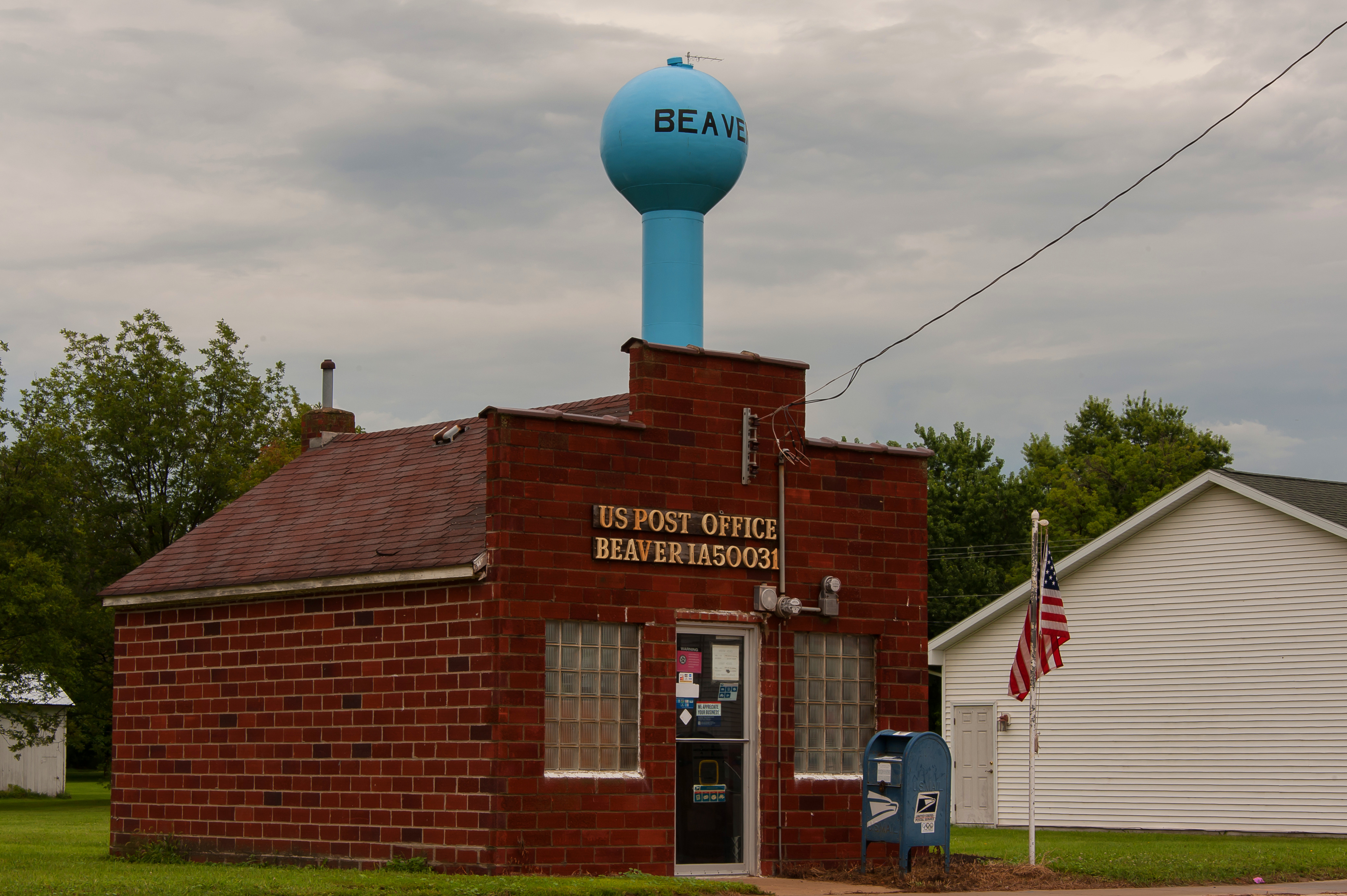
- Beaver Post Office

- Location of Beaver, Iowa
- Coordinates: 42°02′18″N 94°08′24″W
- Country: US
- State: Iowa
- County: Boone
- Township: Amaqua

Area
  - Total: 0.25 sq mi (0.65 km^{2})
  - Land: 0.25 sq mi (0.65 km^{2})
  - Water: 0 sq mi (0.00 km^{2})
- Elevation: 1,027 ft (313 m)

Population (2020)
  - Total: 46
  - Density: 184.3/sq mi (71.16/km^{2})
- Time zone: UTC-6 (Central (CST))
  - Summer (DST): UTC-5 (CDT)
- ZIP code: 50031
- Area code: 515
- FIPS code: 19-05185
- GNIS feature ID: 2394098

Beaver is a city in Amaqua Township, Boone County, Iowa, United States. The population was 46 at the 2020 census. It is part of the Boone, Iowa Micropolitan Statistical Area', which is a part of the larger Ames-Boone, Iowa Combined Statistical Area.

== History ==
Beaver was laid out in 1879. The community takes its name from nearby Beaver Creek. The city was incorporated in 1911.

== Geography ==
According to the United States Census Bureau, the city has a total area of 0.25 square miles (0.65 km^{2}), all land.

== Demographics ==
Historical populations
Year	Pop.	±%
1920	132	—
1930	111	−15.9%
1940	126	+13.5%
1950	114	−9.5%
1960	115	+0.9%
1970	113	−1.7%
1980	85	−24.8%
1990	46	−45.9%
2000	53	+15.2%
2010	48	−9.4%
2020	46	−4.2%
Source:"U.S. Census website". United States Census Bureau. and Iowa Data Center; Source: U.S. Decennial Census

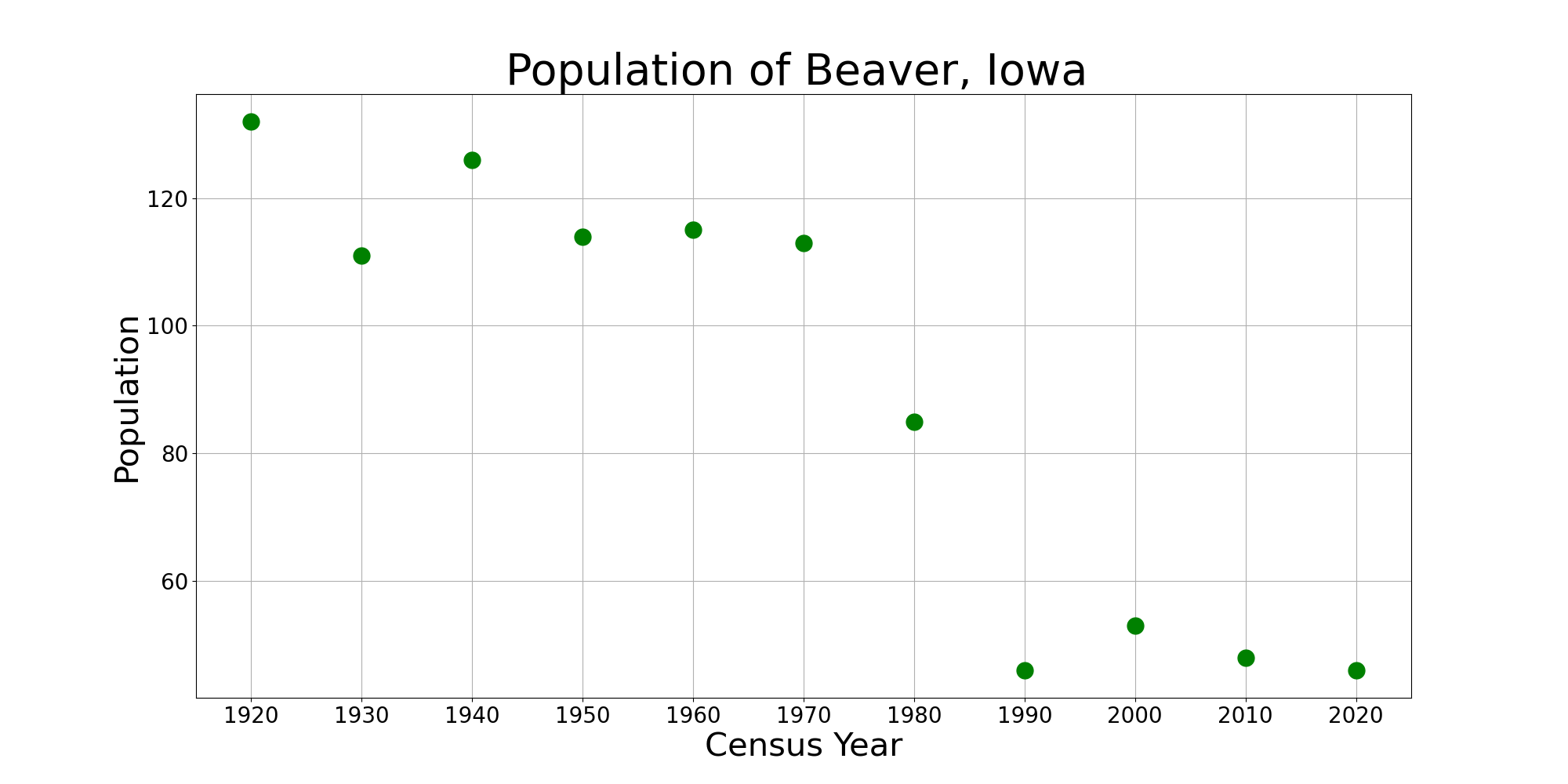
The population of Beaver, Iowa from US census data

=== 2020 census ===
As of the census of 2020, there were 46 people, 18 households, and 11 families residing in the city. The population density was 184.3 inhabitants per square mile (71.2/km^{2}). There were 19 housing units at an average density of 76.1 per square mile (29.4/km^{2}). The racial makeup of the city was 87.0% White, 2.2% Black or African American, 2.2% Native American, 0.0% Asian, 0.0% Pacific Islander, 0.0% from other races and 8.7% from two or more races. Hispanic or Latino persons of any race comprised 0.0% of the population.

Of the 18 households, 38.9% of which had children under the age of 18 living with them, 44.4% were married couples living together, 11.1% were cohabitating couples, 27.8% had a female householder with no spouse or partner present and 16.7% had a male householder with no spouse or partner present. 38.9% of all households were non-families. 27.8% of all households were made up of individuals, 16.7% had someone living alone who was 65 years old or older.

The median age in the city was 40.0 years. 32.6% of the residents were under the age of 20; 0.0% were between the ages of 20 and 24; 30.4% were from 25 and 44; 26.1% were from 45 and 64; and 10.9% were 65 years of age or older. The gender makeup of the city was 39.1% male and 60.9% female.

=== 2010 census ===
As of the census of 2010, there were 48 people, 20 households, and 13 families living in the city. The population density was 192.0 inhabitants per square mile (74.1/km^{2}). There were 28 housing units at an average density of 112.0 per square mile (43.2/km^{2}). The racial makeup of the city was 100.0% White.

There were 20 households, of which 25.0% had children under the age of 18 living with them, 55.0% were married couples living together, 10.0% had a female householder with no husband present, and 35.0% were non-families. 30.0% of all households were made up of individuals, and 20% had someone living alone who was 65 years of age or older. The average household size was 2.40 and the average family size was 3.08.

The median age in the city was 44.5 years. 25% of residents were under the age of 18; 6.4% were between the ages of 18 and 24; 18.9% were from 25 to 44; 29.2% were from 45 to 64; and 20.8% were 65 years of age or older. The gender makeup of the city was 43.8% male and 56.3% female.

=== 2000 census ===
As of the census of 2000, there were 53 people, 21 households, and 14 families living in the city. The population density was 207.0 inhabitants per square mile (79.9/km^{2}). There were 26 housing units at an average density of 101.5 per square mile (39.2/km^{2}). The racial makeup of the city was 94.34% White, 1.89% Native American, 1.89% Asian, and 1.89% from two or more races. Hispanic or Latino of any race were 1.89% of the population.

There were 21 households, out of which 28.6% had children under the age of 18 living with them, 61.9% were married couples living together, 9.5% had a female householder with no husband present, and 28.6% were non-families. 23.8% of all households were made up of individuals, and 9.5% had someone living alone who was 65 years of age or older. The average household size was 2.52 and the average family size was 3.00.

In the city, the population was spread out, with 26.4% under the age of 18, 3.8% from 18 to 24, 24.5% from 25 to 44, 30.2% from 45 to 64, and 15.1% who were 65 years of age or older. The median age was 43 years. For every 100 females, there were 71.0 males. For every 100 females age 18 and over, there were 62.5 males.

The median income for a household in the city was $30,625, and the median income for a family was $31,875. Males had a median income of $26,250 versus $25,625 for females. The per capita income for the city was $13,020. There were no families and 1.8% of the population living below the poverty line, including no under eighteens and 100.0% of those over 64.
