= Dick Williams (singer) =

American singer (1926-2018)

- Born: Richard Blaine Williams; June 7, 1926; Wall Lake, Iowa, U.S.
- Died: May 5, 2018 (aged 91) Burbank, California, U.S.
- Genres: Pop music
- Occupation: Singer
- Instruments: Vocals
- Formerly of: The Williams Brothers

Richard Blaine Williams (June 7, 1926 – May 5, 2018) was an American singer. His brothers, Bob, Don, and Andy Williams, and he performed as a quartet, the Williams Brothers.

== Biography ==
Richard Blaine Williams was born in Wall Lake, Iowa, the son of Jay Emerson and Florence (née Finley) Williams. While living in Cheviot, Ohio, he attended Western Hills High School in Cincinnati, Ohio. He finished high school at University High School, in West Los Angeles, because of his family's move to California. Williams had three brothers: Bob, Don, and Andy. One of his first performances was in a children's choir at the local Presbyterian church. His brothers and he formed the Williams Brothers quartet in late 1938, and they performed on radio in the Midwest, first at WHO, in Des Moines, Iowa. In July 1940, the family moved to Chicago and received a job at WLS, in Chicago, and WLW, in Cincinnati. Moving to Los Angeles in 1943, the Williams Brothers sang with Bing Crosby on the hit record "Swinging on a Star" (1944). They appeared in four musical films: Janie (1944), Kansas City Kitty (1944), Something in the Wind (1947) and Ladies' Man (1947).

The brothers were signed by Metro-Goldwyn-Mayer to appear in Anchors Aweigh and Ziegfeld Follies (1945), but before they went before the cameras, the oldest brother, Bob, was drafted into military service and the group's contract was canceled. Kay Thompson, a former radio star who was now head of the vocal department at MGM, had a nose for talent and hired the remaining three Williams brothers to sing in her large choir on many soundtracks for MGM films, including The Harvey Girls (1946). When Bob completed his military service, Kay hired all four brothers to sing on the soundtrack to Good News (1947).

By then, Thompson was tired of working behind the scenes at MGM, so with the four Williams boys as her backup singers and dancers, she formed a nightclub act called Kay Thompson and the Williams Brothers. They made their debut in Las Vegas in 1947 and became an overnight sensation. Within a year, they were the highest-paid nightclub act in the world, breaking records wherever they appeared. When the Thompson and Williams Brothers act ended in 1953, the brothers broke up and they went their own ways, developing their own solo acts. Dick Williams went to sing with the Harry James band and later in August 1957 landed on Broadway.

During the 1960s, Dick was one of the top jingle singers in New York City, singing on hundreds of commercials. He also wrote special material and vocal arrangements for Steve Lawrence and Edye Gorme, Julie Andrews, and his brother.

In 1976, Dick married Barbara Ann Ruth and had two children with her - Jason Dawes born in 1978 and Amanda Reed born in 1983.

After moving back to California in 1977, Dick worked for The Big Show and did vocal arrangements for The Palm Springs Follies.

In 1998, Andy, Don, Dick, and their sister Jane visited Wall Lake for the dedication of the Williams family home as a historic site and tourist attraction.

== Death ==
Dick Williams died in Burbank, California, on May 5, 2018, aged 91.

== Discography ==
Albums

- Love is Nothin' But Blues

Singles

- "Livin' It Up" / "Robber" RCA Victor 1955
- "Rock Hearted Mama"
- "A Man is Ten Feet Tall"
- "Cryin' The Blues" / "Every Little Once In A While" Decca USA 1958
- "Put on a Happy Face"

Songs

- "La Vie En Rose" vocals on a Harry James album
- "Mona Lisa", vocals on a Harry James Album (#19 on "Most Played Jukebox Records" chart in Billboard magazine, Aug 5, 1950.)
- "Guys and Dolls" vocals - Jan Stewart and Dick Williams, on a Harry James album, 1950 Columbia Records
- "I'll Know" vocals Jan Dick Williams from Guys And Dolls, on Harry James Album, 1950 Columbia Records

== Plays ==
- The Little Blue Light (1951)
- Copper and Brass (1957), musical comedy by Ellen Violet
