= Moingona, Iowa =

Unincorporated community in Iowa, United States Of America

- Unincorporated community
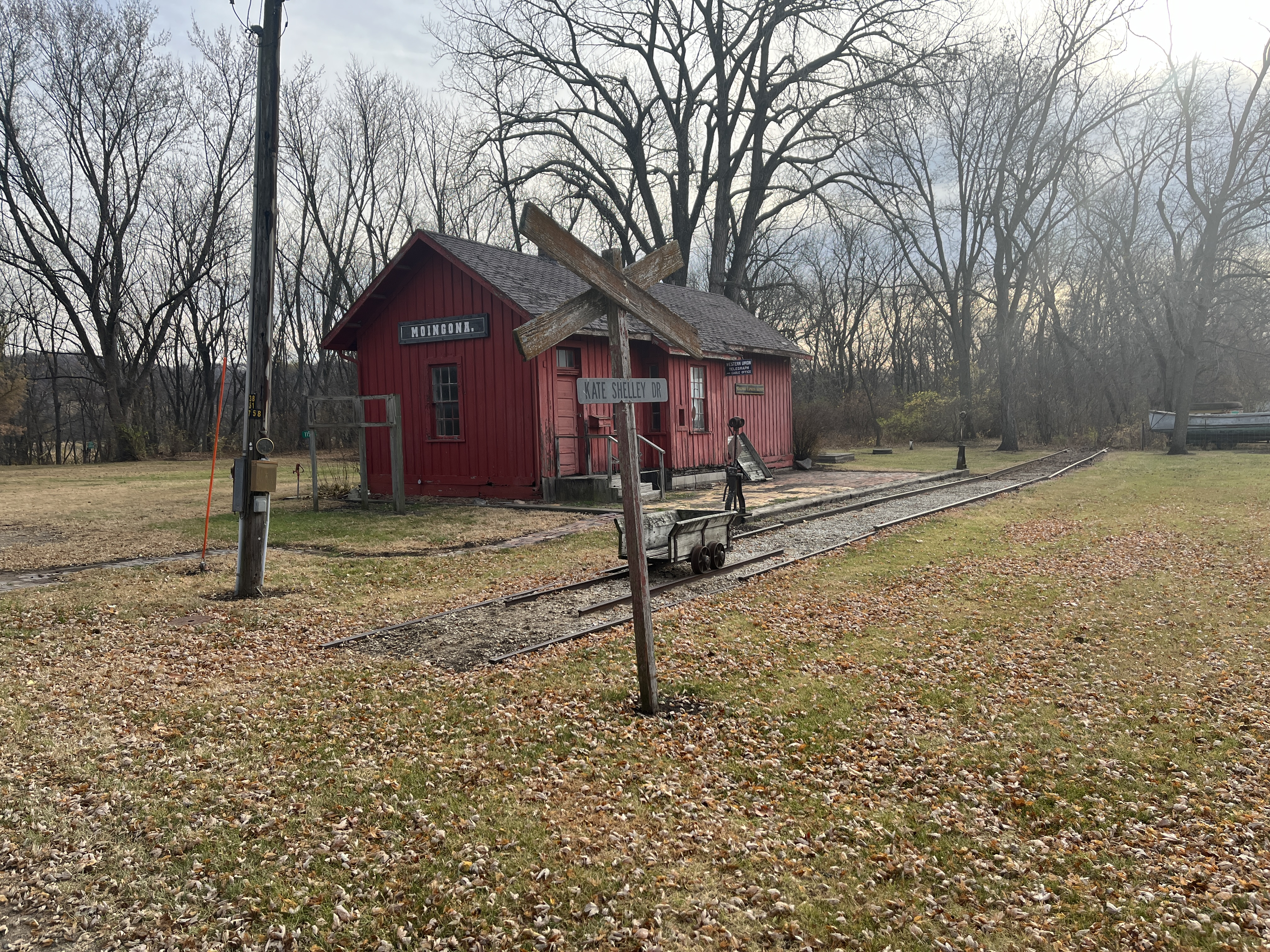
- Chicago and North Western Railway depot in Moingona

- Location within Iowa
- Coordinates: 42°01′01″N 93°55′57″W
- Country: United States
- State: Iowa
- County: Boone
- Elevation: 919 ft (280 m)
- Time zone: UTC-6 (Central (CST))
  - Summer (DST): UTC-5 (CDT)
- Area code: 515
- GNIS feature ID: 459166

Moingona is an unincorporated community in Boone County, in the U.S. state of Iowa.

== History ==
Moingona got its start in 1866, when the Chicago and Northwestern Railroad was extended to that point. The community derives its name from the Moingona Indians. A post office was established at Moingona in 1867, and remained in operation until it was discontinued in 1928. The population was 275 in 1940.

== Notable people ==
- Kate Shelley, a local heroine and namesake of the Kate Shelley High Bridge
