= Kate Shelley =

American railroad heroine and teacher

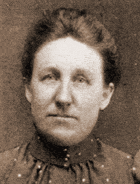
Kate Shelley

Catherine Carroll Shelley (December 12, 1863 – January 21, 1912) was a midwestern United States railroad heroine and the first woman in the United States to have a bridge named after her, the Kate Shelley High Bridge. She was also one of the few women to have a train named after her, the Kate Shelley 400.

== Background ==
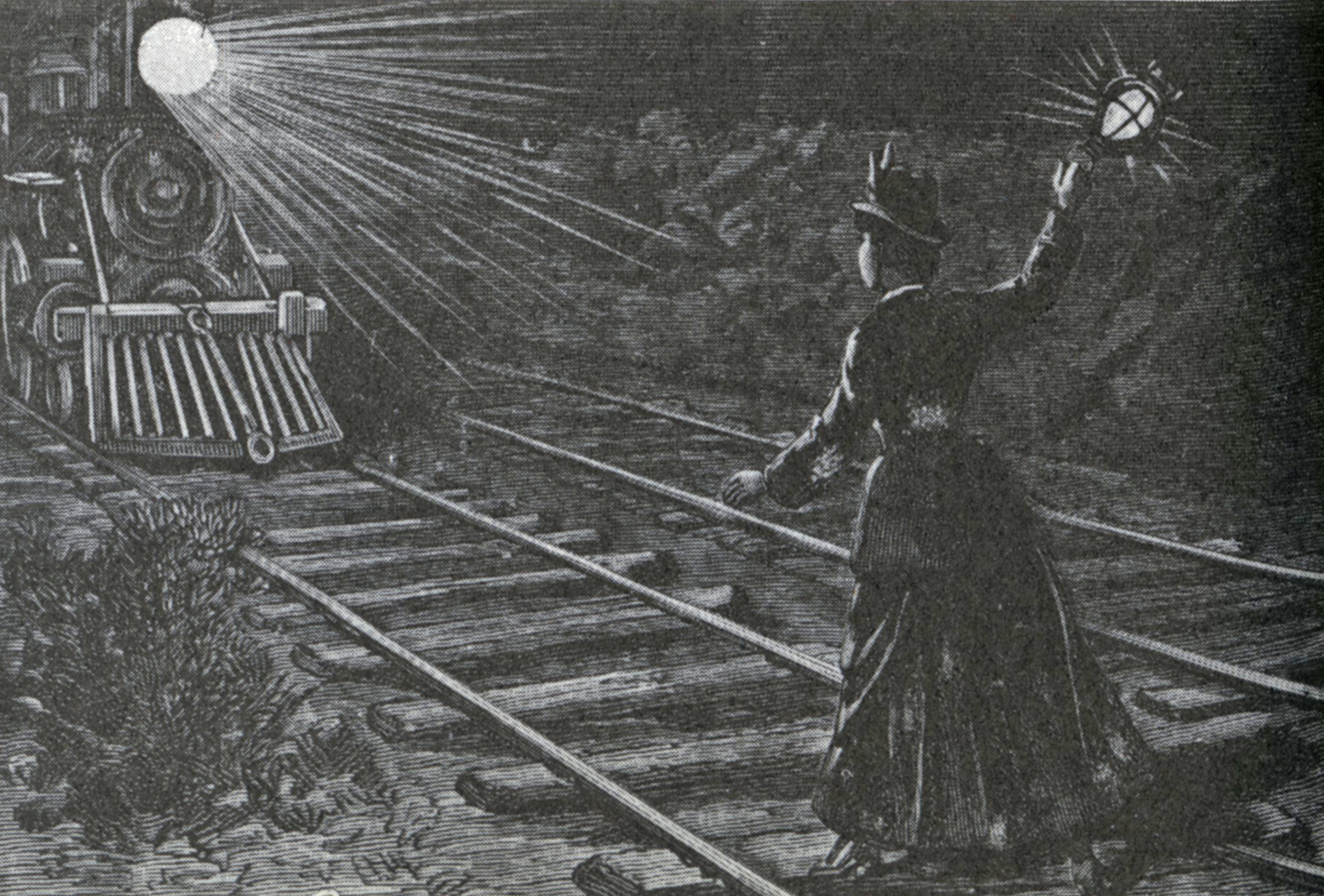
Kate Shelley warning the approaching train – contemporary newspaper illustration

Catherine Carroll Shelley was born at Loughaun, a crossroads near the village of Dunkerrin and the town of Moneygall, in County Offaly, Ireland. Dunkerrin Catholic Church records show that her parents, Michael and Margaret Shelley, married on February 24, 1863, and she was baptized on December 12, 1863. Her grave marker says she was born on September 25, 1865, and died January 21, 1912. The family name was originally spelled Shelly, which is how she wrote her name, but the spelling Shelley was later adopted.

Michael was likely a tenant farmer in Ireland. The family emigrated to the United States when Shelley was 1 1/2 years old. They first lived with relatives near Freeport, Illinois, then built a home on about 163 acres (0.66 km^{2}) near Honey Creek, a perennial tributary stream to the Des Moines River in Boone County, Iowa located to the east of Moingona. Michael became foreman of a section crew, building tracks for the Chicago and North Western Railway.

Michael died of consumption, in 1878. Kate had to help support the family by plowing, planting, harvesting crops, and hunting. In 1880, the family consisted of Margaret, Kate, Mary, and John, living in Worth Township. A fifth child, James, was also born in Iowa, but he drowned while swimming in the Des Moines River when he was ten.

== Honey Creek bridge collapse ==
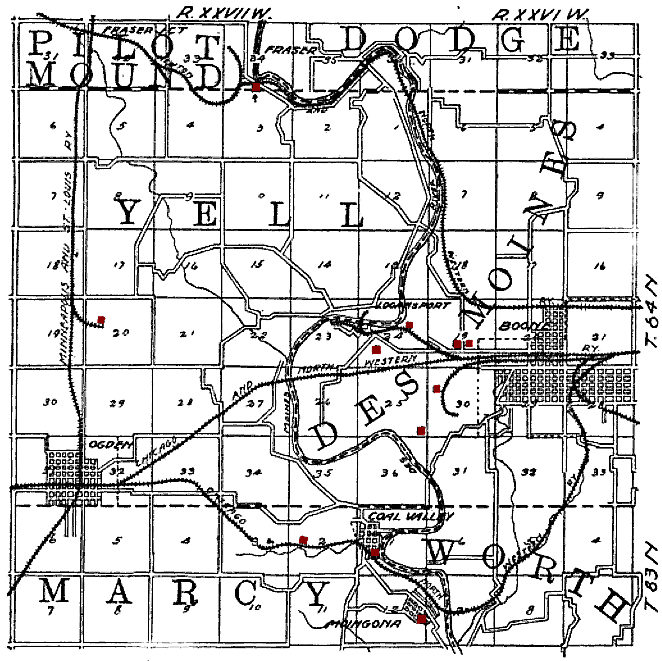
1908 map showing the Chicago and North Western route through Moingona, the southernmost community on the map. The railroad crossed the Des Moines River between Moingona and Honey Creek. (Red dots on the map are coal mines.)

Shelley gained fame due to her heroic actions in the aftermath of the collapse of the Honey Creek bridge near Moingona.

On the afternoon of July 6, 1881, heavy thunderstorms caused a flash flood of Honey Creek, Iowa, washing out timbers that supported the railroad trestle. A pusher locomotive sent from Moingona to check track conditions crossed the Des Moines River bridge, but plunged into Honey Creek when the bridge there fell away at about 11pm, with a crew of four — Edgar Wood, A.P. Olmstead, Adam Agar, and Patrick Donahue.

Shelley heard the crash, and knew that an eastbound express passenger train was due in Moingona about midnight, stopping shortly before heading east over the Des Moines River and then Honey Creek. She found two surviving crew members, Wood and Agar, and shouted that she would get help, having to cross the Des Moines River bridge along the way. The lantern she brought with her went out, and she crawled the span on her hands and knees, with only lightning for illumination. Once across, she had to walk approximately two miles to the Moingona depot to sound the alarm and stop the passenger train. She then led a party back to rescue Wood and Agar. Wood was pulled to safety by a rope, while Agar couldn't be reached until the floodwaters began to recede. Pat Donahue's body was eventually found in a cornfield a quarter mile downstream from the bridge, but A.P. Olmsted was never found. The passenger train was stopped at Scranton, with about 200 aboard.

== Aftermath ==
The passengers who had been saved took up a collection for Shelley. The "little girls" of Dubuque gave her a medal, and the state of Iowa gave her another one, crafted by Tiffany & Co., and US$200 (equivalent to $6,672 in 2025). The Chicago and North Western Railway gave her $100, a half barrel of flour, half a load of coal, and a lifetime pass. The Order of Railway Conductors gave her a gold watch and chain.

News of Shelley's bravery spread nationwide; poems and songs were composed honoring her. The Chicago and North Western Railway built a new steel bridge in 1901 and named it the Boone Viaduct, but people quickly nicknamed it the Kate Shelley Bridge or Kate Shelley High Bridge. It was the first and, until the Betsy Ross Bridge in Philadelphia was opened in 1976, perhaps the only one in the country named after a woman. A second viaduct was built alongside the old one by the Union Pacific Railroad from 2006 to 2009. It can accommodate heavy trains, features two tracks, and can handle two trains simultaneously at a speed of 70 mph. It was opened on October 1, 2009, as the new Kate Shelley Bridge, and is one of North America's tallest double-track railroad bridges.

In the early 1880s, Frances E. Willard, a reformer and temperance leader, wrote Shelley's friend, Isabella Parks, who was the wife of the president of Simpson College at Indianola, offering $25 toward an advanced education for her. Parks raised additional funds for her to attend during the term of 1883–84, but she didn't come back the following term.

== Later in life ==
In 1890, the Chicago Tribune revealed that the Shelley land was mortgaged for $500 at 10% and was near foreclosure. An Armenian rug, woven in the display window of a Chicago furniture store, was auctioned for that amount, retiring the mortgage, and other Chicagoans donated an additional $417.

In July 1896, it was reported that Shelley had applied to the Iowa legislature for employment in the State House as a menial because she was destitute and had to support her mother and invalid brother. She worked at the Iowa State Capitol more than once, but the rumor of an invalid brother was untrue, as John, her surviving one, worked for the Chicago and North Western Railway for most of his life. Ongoing reports that her mother was an invalid or was in ill health, requiring constant care, were also refuted over the years. Her mother died in 1909.

Although there were apparently men interested in Shelley, supposedly including the switchman in the yard at Moingona, she never married and lived most of her life with her mother and sister Mary, known as "Mayme".

Shelley held many odd jobs, including that of second-class teacher in Boone County, until 1903, when the Chicago and North Western Railway gave her the job of station agent at the new Moingona depot, the old depot having burned down in 1901.

In 1910, Shelley's health began to get worse. In June 1911, doctors at Carroll Hospital removed her appendix. After more than a month in the hospital, she returned to Boone County and stayed with John. She was reported to be a little better by September, but she died on January 12, 1912, from Bright's disease (acute nephritis), at the age of 48.

Years later, the Chicago and North Western Railway began operating streamlined passenger trains, and named one the Kate Shelley 400. It operated from 1955 to 1971, although the name was officially dropped in 1963.

== Legacy ==
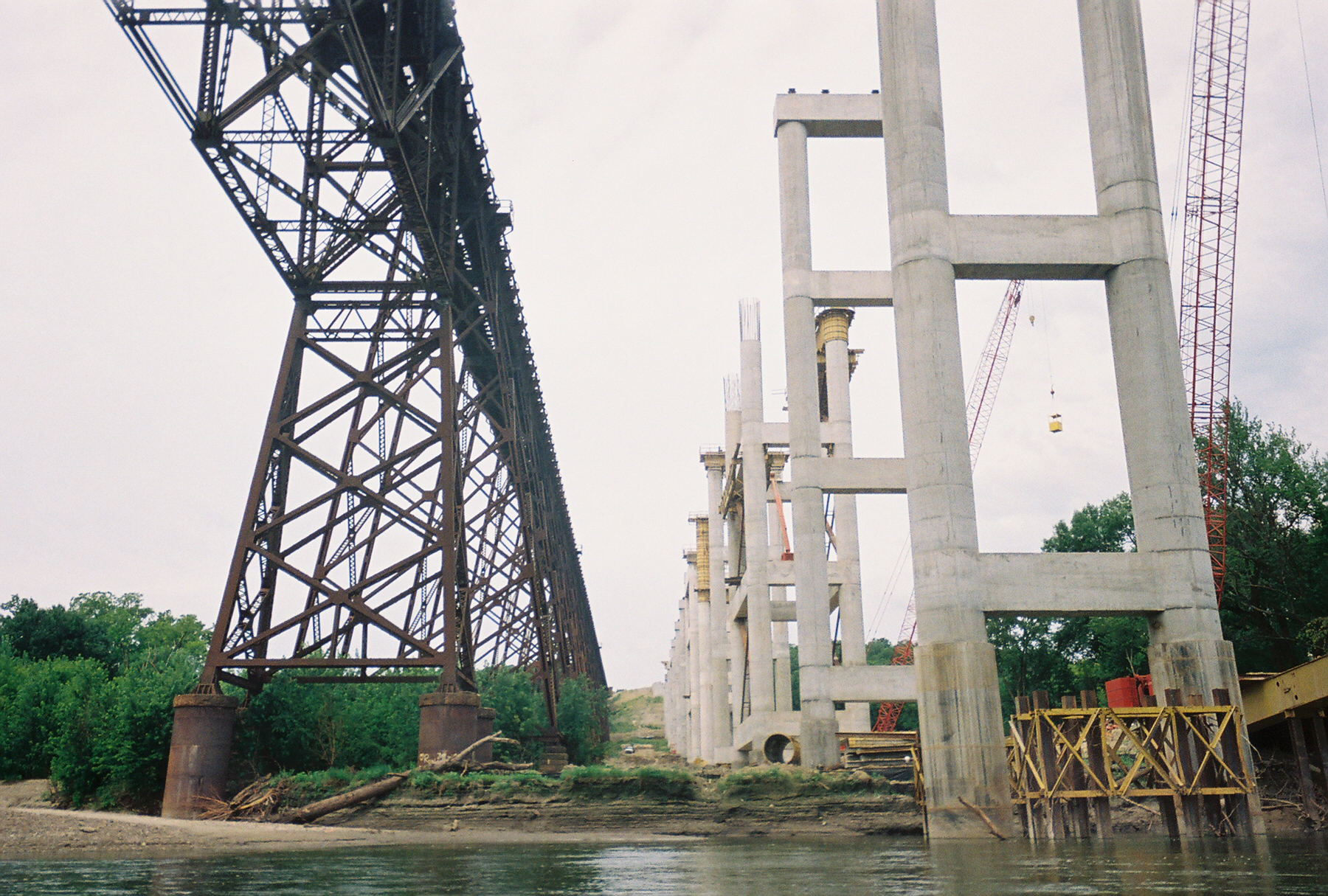
Original steel trestle on the left; new concrete/steel bridge on the right under construction in August 2008.

The Kate Shelley Railroad Museum was built in same location where the Moingona railroad depot was situated in 1881. The Shelley family donated a collection of letters and papers of family members of Shelley, 1860–1911, to Iowa State University. The timetable accents for Metra's Union Pacific West Line are printed in "Kate Shelley Rose" pink.

The original high steel bridge nicknamed the Kate Shelley High Bridge (officially called the Boone Viaduct) still stands. In 2009, the Union Pacific Railroad completed a new concrete and steel one next to it and christened it the Kate Shelley Bridge.

The Iowa poet and politician, John Brayshaw Kaye, wrote a poem in Shelley's honor called, "Our Kate", in his collection Songs of Lake Geneva (1882).

Margaret Wetterer wrote a children's book called Kate Shelley and the Midnight Express in 1990 telling Shelley's story. It was featured in an episode of the children's television program Reading Rainbow.
