= The Williams Brothers =

American sibling vocal quartet (1938–1951)

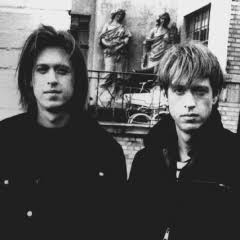
- The second generation left and right: Andrew and David Williams in 1990s

Background information
- Origin: United States
- Genres: Pop
- Years active: 1938–1990s
- Past members: (First generation); Andy Williams; Dick Williams; Bob Williams; Don Williams (Second generation); Andrew Williams; David Williams

The Williams Brothers featuring Andy Williams were a singing quartet formed in the mid-1930s. They initially entertained on radio stations and later appeared in four musical films in the 1940s. After recording with Bing Crosby led to a nightclub act backing Kay Thompson, they broke up in the early 1950s and went their separate ways. Sometimes referred to the second generation, twins Andrew and David (Andy's nephews) began as teen idols and a musical duo in the 1970s, performing extensively on radio, television, and in movies and nightclubs.

== History ==
The four Williams Brothers—Bob, Don, Dick and Andy Williams—formed a singing quartet in the mid-1930s in Wall Lake, Iowa. Their father, Jay Williams, managed and promoted the group. They entertained on radio stations, first at WHO in Des Moines, Iowa, and later at WLS in Chicago and WLW in Cincinnati, before they moved to Los Angeles in 1943, where they were under contract with the MGM film studio. The Williams Brothers appeared in Janie (1944), Kansas City Kitty (1944), Ladies' Man (1947), and Something in the Wind (1947).

They also appeared with Bing Crosby on the hit record "Swinging on a Star" (1944). This led to a nightclub act with entertainer Kay Thompson from 1947 to 1951. The act was staged by MGM choreographer, Robert Alton. They toured night-clubs and cabarets in the United States and internationally with great success and appeared on radio and television establishing a loyal cult following with their jazz-based harmonies and flamboyant performance style. The act broke up in 1951 and the brothers went separate ways, appearing annually on The Andy Williams Christmas Special from 1962 through the 1990s.

Albums:

- 1969: The Williams Brothers Christmas Album - Andy Williams & the Williams Brothers
- 1970: Christmas with Andy Williams & the Williams Brothers - Andy Williams & the Williams Brothers
- 2001: Holiday Magic with Andy Williams & the Williams Brothers
- 2014: The Williams Brothers Christmas (remastered)

== Bob Williams ==
Robert F. Williams was born in Wall Lake, Iowa, US on January 1, 1918. He was a singer and actor. He appeared in the films Janie (1944) and Something in the Wind (1947). He reunited with his brothers yearly from 1962 to 1990 for Andy's Christmas specials. He died on September 23, 2003, in Terra Bella, California.

== Don Williams ==
Donald J. Williams was born in Wall Lake, Iowa, on October 9, 1922. After the Williams Brothers broke up, Don Williams moved back to Los Angeles. In LA, he worked on TV shows, where he sang on the Eddie Fisher and Nat King Cole television shows. He put together his own act the "Don Williams Singers" and sang for a number of TV commercials. He also performed in a singing quartet group, The Masquers, with Burl Ives in a 1951 music video under "Snader Telescriptions" titled "Noah Found Grace in the Eyes of the Lord". He was on The Andy Williams Christmas Show. He was an opening act at the new Tropicana Las Vegas hotel where he performed for two years. In 1958, he was in the musical show "Tropicana Holiday". He then became an agent and manager. He united with his brothers yearly from 1962 to 1990 for The Andy Williams Christmas. Don Williams County Park in Iowa is named after him.

Don Williams died in Branson, Missouri, on December 30, 2022, at the age of 100.

== The Williams Brothers, second generation (Andrew and David Williams) ==
Twin brothers Andrew Williams and David Williams (born February 22, 1959, in Henderson, Nevada, USA), nephews of singer Andy Williams, recorded as the Williams Brothers in the 1990s, and made the Billboard Hot 100 with their song "Can't Cry Hard Enough" in 1992. As teen idols, they also made the Hot 100 in 1974, billed as "Andy and David Williams", with the No. 92 entry "What's Your Name". This followed an appearance in The Partridge Family.

== Tribute ==
Liza Minnelli has paid tribute to the Kay Thompson and the Williams Brothers act in The South Bank Show (2008). In her 2008 tour, Minnelli devoted much of the performance to recreating the act, using Thompson's trademark music. The success of this tribute led to Minnelli's return to Broadway in December 2008. Liza's at the Palace! opened at New York's legendary Palace Theatre, an affectionate salute to her godmother, Kay Thompson. Supported by a quartet of dynamic singer/dancers standing in for the original Williams Brothers, Minnelli performed musical hits (with the original vocal arrangements) from the famous act, including such numbers as "I Love a Violin", "Clap Yo' Hands", "Jubilee Time", and "Hello Hello". The show won a Tony Award, and was subsequently released on a double CD, preserving the nightclub material in a state-of-the-art recording.

== Articles and reviews ==
- Detroit News Pictorial. December 14, 1947.
- Chicago Daily News. Thursday, June 17, 1948.
- This Week in Montreal. Friday, December 31, 1948.
- Paul V. Coates. “Well, Medium and Rare”. Los Angeles Mirror. Monday, July 31, 1951. p. 10.
- Variety. October 3, 1951. p. 64.
