= Angus, Iowa =

- Unincorporated community
- Location within Iowa
- Coordinates: 41°53′00″N 94°09′27″W
- Country: United States
- State: Iowa
- County: Boone
- Elevation: 1,024 ft (312 m)
- Time zone: UTC-6 (Central (CST))
  - Summer (DST): UTC-5 (CDT)
- Area code: 515
- GNIS feature ID: 454191

Angus (formerly known as Coaltown) is an unincorporated community in Boone County, in the U.S. state of Iowa.

== History ==
Angus was originally named Coaltown as a coal mining community in the 1870s. A post office was established in Coaltown in 1879. In 1881, the name was changed to Angus, honoring a railroad official. The population was 150 in 1940. The post office closed in the 1950s.
