= Pilot Mound, Iowa =

- City
- Location of Pilot Mound, Iowa
- Coordinates: 42°09′33″N 94°01′06″W
- Country: US
- State: Iowa
- County: Boone
- Township: Pilot Mound

Area
  - Total: 0.98 sq mi (2.54 km^{2})
  - Land: 0.98 sq mi (2.54 km^{2})
  - Water: 0 sq mi (0.00 km^{2})
- Elevation: 1,096 ft (334 m)

Population (2020)
  - Total: 163
  - Density: 165.9/sq mi (64.06/km^{2})
- Time zone: UTC-6 (Central (CST))
  - Summer (DST): UTC-5 (CDT)
- ZIP code: 50223
- Area code: 515
- FIPS code: 19-62850
- GNIS feature ID: 2396206
- Website: pilotmound.org

Pilot Mound is a city in Pilot Mound Township, Boone County, Iowa, United States. The population was 163 at the time of the 2020 census. It is part of the Boone, Iowa Micropolitan Statistical Area, which is a part of the larger Ames-Boone, Iowa Combined Statistical Area.

== History ==
A post office called Pilot Mound has been in operation since 1865. The post office antedates the town's existence. Pilot Mound was laid out as a town in 1881. The community took its name from a prominent summit which affords a clear view of the surrounding area.

== Geography ==
According to the United States Census Bureau, the city has a total area of 0.98 square miles (2.54 km^{2}), all land. Bluff Creek flows near the town site.

== Demographics ==
Historical populations
| Year | Pop. | ±% |
|---|---|---|
| 1900 | 315 | — |
| 1910 | 347 | +10.2% |
| 1920 | 311 | −10.4% |
| 1930 | 274 | −11.9% |
| 1940 | 282 | +2.9% |
| 1950 | 246 | −12.8% |
| 1960 | 196 | −20.3% |
| 1970 | 214 | +9.2% |
| 1980 | 223 | +4.2% |
| 1990 | 199 | −10.8% |
| 2000 | 214 | +7.5% |
| 2010 | 173 | −19.2% |
| 2020 | 163 | −5.8% |
Source:"U.S. Census website". United States Census Bureau. and Iowa Data Center; Source: U.S. Decennial Census

=== 2020 census ===
As of the census of 2020, there were 163 people, 75 households, and 39 families residing in the city. The population density was 165.9 inhabitants per square mile (64.1/km^{2}). There were 85 housing units at an average density of 86.5 per square mile (33.4/km^{2}). The racial makeup of the city was 95.1% White, 0.0% Black or African American, 0.6% Native American, 0.0% Asian, 0.0% Pacific Islander, 0.6% from other races and 3.7% from two or more races. Hispanic or Latino persons of any race comprised 1.2% of the population.

Of the 75 households, 33.3% of which had children under the age of 18 living with them, 36.0% were married couples living together, 9.3% were cohabitating couples, 20.0% had a female householder with no spouse or partner present and 34.7% had a male householder with no spouse or partner present. 48.0% of all households were non-families. 34.7% of all households were made up of individuals, 13.3% had someone living alone who was 65 years old or older.

The median age in the city was 38.1 years. 23.9% of the residents were under the age of 20; 4.9% were between the ages of 20 and 24; 29.4% were from 25 and 44; 22.7% were from 45 and 64; and 19.0% were 65 years of age or older. The gender makeup of the city was 49.1% male and 50.9% female.

=== 2010 census ===
As of the census of 2010, there were 173 people, 83 households, and 47 families living in the city. The population density was 176.5 inhabitants per square mile (68.1/km^{2}). There were 99 housing units at an average density of 101.0 per square mile (39.0/km^{2}). The racial makeup of the city was 96.0% White, 2.3% African American, 0.6% Native American, and 1.2% from two or more races.

There were 83 households, of which 20.5% had children under the age of 18 living with them, 47.0% were married couples living together, 3.6% had a female householder with no husband present, 6.0% had a male householder with no wife present, and 43.4% were non-families. 36.1% of all households were made up of individuals, and 18% had someone living alone who was 65 years of age or older. The average household size was 2.08 and the average family size was 2.68.

The median age in the city was 51.9 years. 15% of residents were under the age of 18; 7.4% were between the ages of 18 and 24; 18.6% were from 25 to 44; 34.1% were from 45 to 64; and 24.9% were 65 years of age or older. The gender makeup of the city was 52.6% male and 47.4% female.

=== 2000 census ===
As of the census of 2000, there were 214 people, 96 households, and 55 families living in the city. The population density was 225.6 inhabitants per square mile (87.1/km^{2}). There were 102 housing units at an average density of 107.5 per square mile (41.5/km^{2}). The racial makeup of the city was 99.53% White and 0.47% Native American.

There were 96 households, out of which 21.9% had children under the age of 18 living with them, 47.9% were married couples living together, 3.1% had a female householder with no husband present, and 41.7% were non-families. 35.4% of all households were made up of individuals, and 21.9% had someone living alone who was 65 years of age or older. The average household size was 2.23 and the average family size was 2.79.

In the city, the population was spread out, with 20.1% under the age of 18, 6.1% from 18 to 24, 22.9% from 25 to 44, 30.4% from 45 to 64, and 20.6% who were 65 years of age or older. The median age was 46 years. For every 100 females, there were 120.6 males. For every 100 females age 18 and over, there were 98.8 males.

The median income for a household in the city was $29,750, and the median income for a family was $35,313. Males had a median income of $28,125 versus $22,031 for females. The per capita income for the city was $14,414. About 4.9% of families and 8.5% of the population were below the poverty line, including none of those under the age of eighteen and 14.5% of those 65 or over.

== Education ==
It is in the Southeast Valley Community School District. Southeast Valley High School in Gowrie is that district's comprehensive high school.

Pilot Mound was a part of the Southeast Webster-Grand Community School District, established on July 1, 2005 by the merger of the Grand Community School District and the Southeast Webster Community School District. In 2023 the Southeast Webster-Grand district merged into the Southeast Valley district.
