= Centerville, Boone County, Iowa =

Centerville, Iowa
- Unincorporated community
- Location within Iowa
- Coordinates: 42°05′34″N 93°56′08″W
- Country: United States
- State: Iowa
- County: Boone
- Elevation: 919 ft (280 m)
- Time zone: UTC-6 (Central (CST))
  - Summer (DST): UTC-5 (CDT)
- Area code: 515
- GNIS feature ID: 455311

Centerville is an unincorporated community in Boone County, in the U.S. state of Iowa.

== History ==
Centerville was platted in 1855, but the town's growth soon failed to meet the expectations of its founders. The town's mill was destroyed in 1858, and the Centerville dwindled in importance. By 1914, Centerville contained but a "half dozen houses".
