= Mackey, Iowa =

- Unincorporated community
- Location within Iowa
- Coordinates: 42°09′59″N 93°45′25″W
- Country: United States
- State: Iowa
- County: Boone
- Elevation: 1,007 ft (307 m)
- Time zone: UTC-6 (Central (CST))
  - Summer (DST): UTC-5 (CDT)
- Area code: 515
- GNIS feature ID: 464638

Mackey is an unincorporated community in Boone County, in the U.S. state of Iowa.

== History ==
The community was named after Sebastian Mackey, an early settler. Mackey was not officially platted. A variant name was "Mackey’s Grove". A post office called Mackeys Grove was established in 1870, the name was changed to Mackey in 1883, and the post office closed in 1905. Mackey's population was 25 in 1902, and 51 in 1925.
