= Peoples Township, Boone County, Iowa =

Township in Iowa, US

Peoples Township, Boone County
- Township
- Coordinates: 41°54′41″N 093°59′21″W
- Country: United States
- State: Iowa
- County: Boone

Area
  - Total: 36.12 sq mi (93.54 km^{2})
  - Land: 36.12 sq mi (93.54 km^{2})
  - Water: 0 sq mi (0 km^{2})
- Elevation: 1,079 ft (329 m)

Population (2000)
  - Total: 346
  - Density: 9.6/sq mi (3.7/km^{2})
- FIPS code: 19-93291
- GNIS feature ID: 0468505

Peoples Township is one of seventeen townships in Boone County, Iowa, United States. As of the 2000 census, its population was 346.

== History ==
Peoples Township was established in 1871. It was named for David Peoples, an early settler.

== Geography ==
Peoples Township covers an area of 36.12 square miles (93.6 km^{2}) and contains no incorporated settlements. According to the USGS, it contains two cemeteries: Peoples and Peoples.
