= Grant Township, Boone County, Iowa =

Township in Iowa, US

Grant Township, Boone County
- Township
- Coordinates: 42°10′11″N 094°06′04″W
- Country: United States
- State: Iowa
- County: Boone

Area
  - Total: 36.24 sq mi (93.86 km^{2})
  - Land: 36.24 sq mi (93.86 km^{2})
  - Water: 0 sq mi (0 km^{2})
- Elevation: 1,138 ft (347 m)

Population (2000)
  - Total: 408
  - Density: 11/sq mi (4.3/km^{2})
- FIPS code: 19-91629
- GNIS feature ID: 0467930

Grant Township is one of seventeen townships in Boone County, Iowa, United States. As of the 2000 census, its population was 408.

== History ==
Grant Township was organized in 1871.

== Geography ==
Grant Township covers an area of 36.24 square miles (93.9 km^{2}) and contains one incorporated settlement, Boxholm. According to the USGS, it contains three cemeteries: Lawn, Renner and Union.
