= Boone County Courthouse (Iowa) =

- U.S. National Register of Historic Places
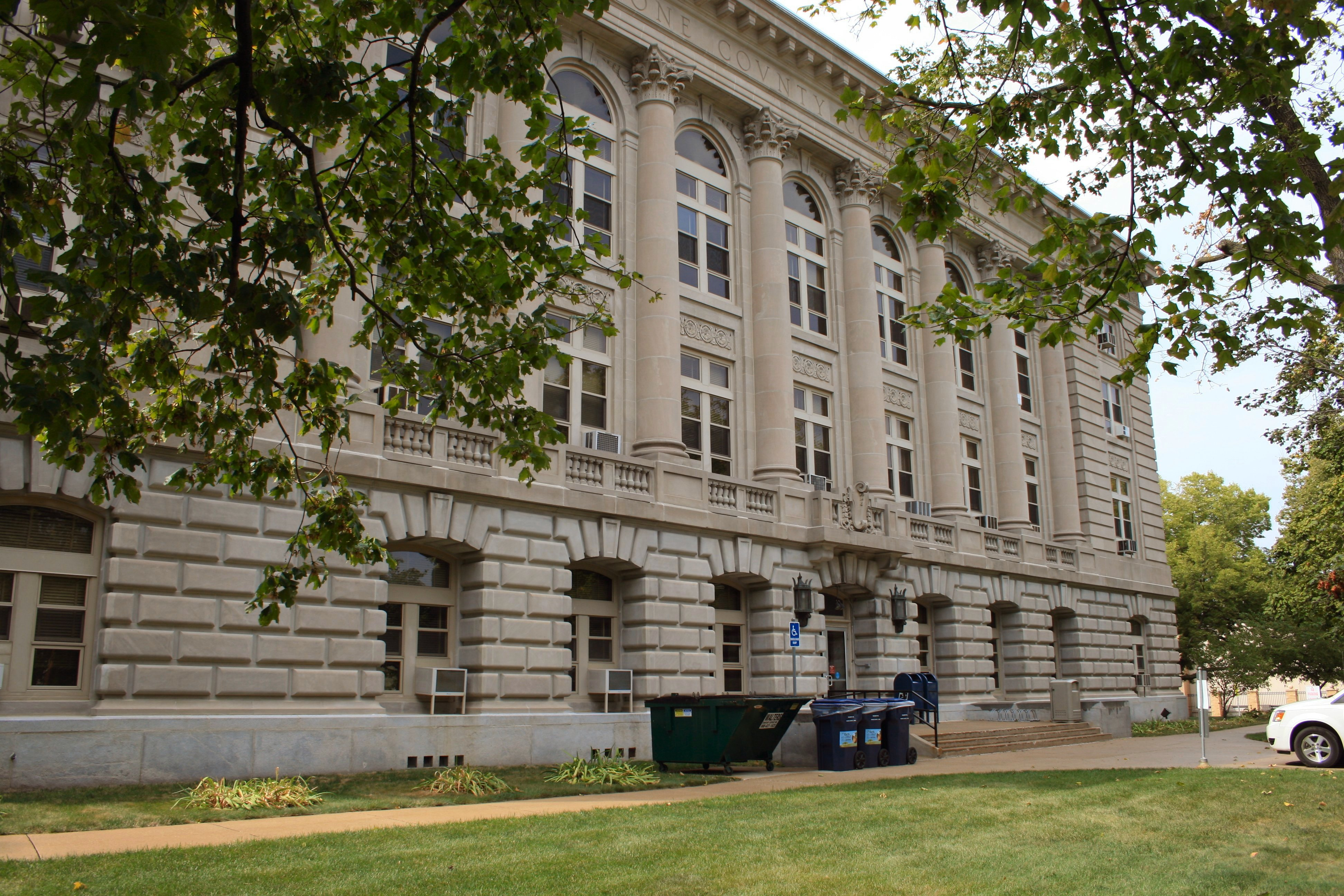
- Boone County Courthouse

- Location within Iowa Location within the United States
- Interactive map showing the location for Boone County Courthouse
- Location: N. State and W. 2nd Sts. Boone, Iowa
- Coordinates: 42°3′32″N 93°54′22″W
- Area: less than one acre
- Built: 1917
- Architect: Norman T. Vorse
- Architectural style: Renaissance Revival
- MPS: County Courthouses in Iowa TR
- NRHP reference No.: 81000226
- Added to NRHP: July 2, 1981

The Boone County Courthouse, located in Boone, Iowa, United States, was built in 1917. It was listed on the National Register of Historic Places in 1981 as a part of the County Courthouses in Iowa Thematic Resource. The courthouse is the third building the county has used for court functions and county administration.

== History ==
The first county seat for Boone County was located in the former town of Boonesboro, and a double log house was used for court purposes. It was the first building constructed in town after it was declared the county seat in 1851. The first building to properly be called a courthouse was a two-story building constructed in 1856 at a cost of $2,100. When it was decided to build a new courthouse, the town of Montana desired the new structure be built there. After two votes Boonesboro retained the county seat and a three-story brick courthouse was completed in 1868 for $35,000. It featured prominent porticos with full-height columns and a central tower capped with a dome that rose 68 feet (21 m) above the ground. Amateur artists frescoed the walls over the years. Meanwhile, the town of Montana continued to grow and expand and changed its name to Boone and incorporated what had been Boonesboro in 1892.

Space in the old courthouse had become insufficient so plans were made for a new courthouse. The present courthouse was completed in 1917 for $250,000. The Renaissance Revival building was designed by Des Moines architect Norman T. Vorse. It features marble walls, terrazzo floors, coffered ceilings, and stained glass skylights. On the exterior of the main facade, eight columns in antis are located between the windows on the two upper floors. The columns have capitals in the Corinthian order. A dentilated cornice circles the building. The courthouse's significance is derived from its association with county government, and the political power and prestige of Boone as the county seat.
