= Garden Township, Iowa =

Township in Iowa, US

Garden Township, Boone County
- Township
- Coordinates: 41°54′17″N 093°45′22″W
- Country: United States
- State: Iowa
- County: Boone

Area
  - Total: 36.48 sq mi (94.47 km^{2})
  - Land: 36.46 sq mi (94.44 km^{2})
  - Water: 0.012 sq mi (0.03 km^{2})
- Elevation: 1,027 ft (313 m)

Population (2000)
  - Total: 1,022
  - Density: 28/sq mi (10.8/km^{2})
- FIPS code: 19-91503
- GNIS feature ID: 0467888

Garden Township is one of seventeen townships in Boone County, Iowa, United States. As of the 2000 census, its population was 1,022.

== History ==
Garden Township was organized in 1871.

== Geography ==
Garden Township covers an area of 36.47 square miles (94.5 km^{2}) and contains no incorporated settlements. According to the USGS, it contains two cemeteries: Garden Prairie and Hillsdale.
