= Yell Township, Boone County, Iowa =

Township in Iowa, US

Yell Township, Boone County
- Township
- Coordinates: 42°04′24″N 094°00′04″W
- Country: United States
- State: Iowa
- County: Boone

Area
  - Total: 32.58 sq mi (84.39 km^{2})
  - Land: 32.11 sq mi (83.16 km^{2})
  - Water: 0.47 sq mi (1.23 km^{2})
- Elevation: 1,027 ft (313 m)

Population (2000)
  - Total: 2,273
  - Density: 71/sq mi (27.3/km^{2})
- FIPS code: 19-94797
- GNIS feature ID: 0469022

Yell Township is one of seventeen townships in Boone County, Iowa, United States. As of the 2000 census, its population was 2,273.

== History ==
Yell Township was organized in 1852. It is named for Colonel Archibald Yell, who fell at the Battle of Buena Vista.

== Geography ==
Yell Township covers an area of 32.58 square miles (84.4 km^{2}) and contains one incorporated settlement, Ogden. According to the USGS, it contains six cemeteries: Bluff Creek, Buckley, Hickory Grove, Milton Lott Grave, Mount Olive and Rose Hill.
