= Marcy Township, Boone County, Iowa =

Township in Iowa, US

Marcy Township, Boone County
- Township
- Coordinates: 41°59′11″N 093°58′47″W
- Country: United States
- State: Iowa
- County: Boone

Area
  - Total: 42.07 sq mi (108.95 km^{2})
  - Land: 41.84 sq mi (108.37 km^{2})
  - Water: 0.22 sq mi (0.57 km^{2})
- Elevation: 1,079 ft (329 m)

Population (2000)
  - Total: 1,137
  - Density: 27/sq mi (10.5/km^{2})
- FIPS code: 19-92832
- GNIS feature ID: 0468346

Marcy Township is one of seventeen townships in Boone County, Iowa, United States. As of the 2000 census, its population was 1,137.

== History ==
Marcy Township was organized in 1858. It is named for William L. Marcy.

== Geography ==
Marcy Township covers an area of 42.06 square miles (108.9 km^{2}), and contains no incorporated settlements. According to the USGS, it contains seven cemeteries: Glenwood, Holloway, Oakwood, Pleasant Hill, Quincy, Sparks and Swede Valley Lutheran.
