= Don Williams County Park =

Park in Iowa, United States

Coordinates: 42°06′55″N 94°01′05″W

Don Williams County Park is a park in Boone County, Iowa, north of Ogden. It surrounds Don Williams Reservoir, which flooded during the construction of a dam. It is 600 acres and includes a 150-acre lake. The campground is open from April 15 to October 15. The park is also the headquarters for Boone County Conservation. The Park is named after an Iowa conservation pioneer, Donald Williams (no relation to singer Don Williams). Donald Williams was a founding member of the Boone County Conservation Board and was instrumental in passing the Iowa legislation that founded the Iowa County Conservation System.
