= Herrold Bridge =

Bridge in Herrold, Iowa

- U.S. National Register of Historic Places
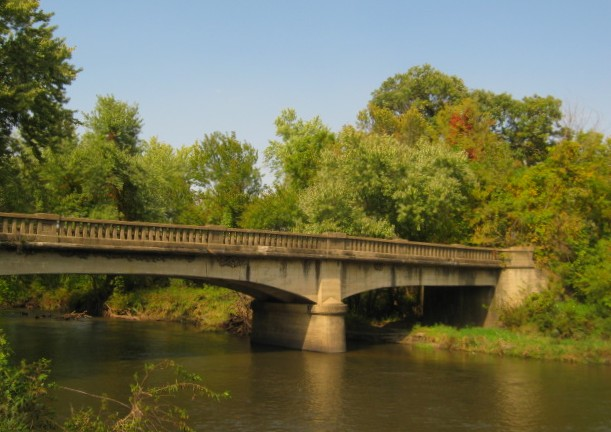

- Location within Iowa Location within the United States
- Location: NW. 88th Ave. over Beaver Creek
- Nearest city: Herrold, Iowa
- Coordinates: 41°43′19.3″N 93°45′01″W
- Built: 1921
- Built by: Ben Cole
- Architect: Iowa State Highway Commission
- Architectural style: Girder bridge
- MPS: Highway Bridges of Iowa MPS
- NRHP reference No.: 98000490
- Added to NRHP: May 15, 1998

The Herrold Bridge is a historic structure located near the unincorporated community of Herrold, Iowa, United States. It carried a gravel road for 156 feet (48 m) over Beaver Creek. Completed in 1921, this concrete cantilevered deck girder bridge replaced an earlier timber pile structure. It was designed by the Iowa State Highway Commission the previous year, and the Polk County Board of Supervisors awarded the construction contract to Ben Cole of Ames. The total cost of construction was $24,283.36. The bridge features three arched concrete deck girder spans that are cantilevered from concrete abutments and piers. It is considered one of the most technologically significant of Iowa's concrete girder bridges. The bridge was listed on the National Register of Historic Places in 1998. The Herrold Bridge remains in place but was replaced by a newer span slightly downstream.

== See also ==
- List of bridges on the National Register of Historic Places in Iowa
- National Register of Historic Places listings in Linn County, Iowa
