= Ralph O. Zollinger =

American adventurer, soldier, and journalist (1886–1967)

- Born: Ross Olives Zollinger; Ogden, Iowa, United States
- Died: October 26, 1967 (aged 81); Austin, Texas, United States
- Other name: R.O. Zollinger
- Occupation: Journalist
- Known for: Chief editorial writer for Newspapers, Inc.

Ralph O. Zollinger (May 14, 1886 – October 26, 1967) was an American adventurer, soldier, and journalist long associated with the Austin American. He was once declared the "dean of Texas editorial writers".

== Early life and education ==
Zollinger was born to a printshop owner in Ogden, Iowa. He left home at age 14 and began a period of itinerant wandering, working his way across Russia, Egypt, the Philippines, Australia, Nicaragua, and touring the United States as a saxophonist in a circus band.

At age 21, he was appointed justice of the peace in Beach, North Dakota, simultaneously serving as editor of the community's weekly newspaper. The dual employment put him in the position of both adjudicating and reporting on a range war then occurring in the western part of the state, and Zollinger was the target of an unsuccessful assassination attempt.

During World War I, Zollinger voluntarily enlisted in the United States Army and served in the 2nd Infantry Division, seeing action in France.

== Career ==
Following the war, he worked for the Houston Chronicle, Fort Worth Star-Telegram, and Minneapolis Tribune, before being hired as a sports editor for the Port Arthur News in Port Arthur, Texas in 1922. He eventually worked his way up to the post of managing editor of the newspaper. As editor of the Port Arthur News, he interviewed Leon Trotsky when Trotsky's ship made a port call in Port Arthur while en route to the exiled Soviet dissident's final destination of Mexico.

In 1937, Zollinger was promoted to chief editorial writer for Newspapers, Inc., the owner of the Port Arthur News, the Lufkin News, the Waco News-Tribune, and the Austin American. That promotion coincided with a move to Austin, Texas so he could be closer to the center of Texas politics. Over the course of the next 30 years with Newspapers, Inc., Zollinger earned the sobriquet of "dean of Texas editorial writers".

He entered semi-retirement in June 1967.

== Personal life ==
Zollinger was married and had two daughters, one of whom died in childhood.
