= Dodge Township, Boone County, Iowa =

Township in Iowa, US

Dodge Township, Boone County
- Township
- Coordinates: 42°10′26″N 093°53′46″W
- Country: United States
- State: Iowa
- County: Boone

Area
  - Total: 48.38 sq mi (125.31 km^{2})
  - Land: 48.16 sq mi (124.73 km^{2})
  - Water: 0.22 sq mi (0.58 km^{2})
- Elevation: 1,150 ft (350 m)

Population (2000)
  - Total: 540
  - Density: 11/sq mi (4.3/km^{2})
- FIPS code: 19-91002
- GNIS feature ID: 0467716

Dodge Township is one of seventeen townships in Boone County, Iowa, United States. As of the 2000 census, its population was 540.

== History ==
Dodge Township was organized in 1852. It is named for Augustus C. Dodge.

== Geography ==
Dodge Township covers an area of 48.38 square miles (125.3 km^{2}) and contains one incorporated settlement, Fraser. According to the USGS, it contains four cemeteries: Boone County Farm, Leininger, Mineral Ridge and White.
