= Herrold, Iowa =

- Unincorporated community
- Location within Iowa Location within the United States
- Coordinates: 41°43′14″N 93°44′13″W
- Country: United States
- State: Iowa
- County: Polk
- Township: Jefferson
- Elevation: 853 ft (260 m)
- Time zone: UTC-6 (Central (CST))
  - Summer (DST): UTC-5 (CDT)
- Area code: 515
- GNIS feature ID: 2047899

Herrold is an unincorporated community in Polk County, Iowa, United States. Herrold is located in Jefferson Township. The state capital and county seat of Des Moines is slightly over 10 miles (16 km) to the southeast. Since 1990, the town has been part of nearby Camp Dodge and is not open to the public.

The historic Herrold Bridge crosses the Beaver Creek to the west of the community.

== History ==
Herrold's population was 75 in 1925. The Iowa National Guard bought the town in 1990, and turned it into a training range. Most buildings from the town are now gone, but the schoolhouse is still used for training activities at Camp Dodge, and was renovated as recently as 2022. The population was 81 in 1940.
