= Beaver Township, Boone County, Iowa =

Township in Iowa, US

Beaver Township, Boone County
- Township
- Coordinates: 41°59′26″N 094°06′28″W
- Country: United States
- State: Iowa
- County: Boone

Area
  - Total: 35.05 sq mi (90.77 km^{2})
  - Land: 35.05 sq mi (90.77 km^{2})
  - Water: 0 sq mi (0 km^{2})
- Elevation: 1,001 ft (305 m)

Population (2000)
  - Total: 191
  - Density: 5.4/sq mi (2.1/km^{2})
- FIPS code: 19-90150
- GNIS feature ID: 0467422

Beaver Township is one of seventeen townships in Boone County, Iowa, United States. As of the 2000 census, its population was 191.

== History ==
Beaver Township was established in 1871. It is named for the Beaver Creek, along which many beavers were once trapped.

== Geography ==
Beaver Township covers an area of 35.05 square miles (90.8 km^{2}) and contains no incorporated settlements.
