= Coal Valley, Iowa =

- Former town
- Location within Iowa Location within the United States
- Coordinates: 42°01′54″N 93°57′03″W
- Country: United States
- State: Iowa
- County: Boone
- Elevation: 896 ft (273 m)
- Time zone: UTC-6 (Central (CST))
  - Summer (DST): UTC-5 (CDT)
- GNIS feature ID: 464503

Coal Valley is an extinct town in Boone County, in the U.S. state of Iowa. The GNIS classifies it as a populated place.

== History ==
Coal Valley was platted in 1867 as a coal mining community. Once the coal deposits were exhausted, Coal Valley's business activity shifted elsewhere and its population dwindled. The former town site now is farmland.
