= Fraser, Iowa =

- City
- Location of Fraser, Iowa
- Coordinates: 42°07′32″N 93°58′12″W
- Country: US
- State: Iowa
- County: Boone
- Township: Dodge

Area
  - Total: 1.25 sq mi (3.24 km^{2})
  - Land: 1.14 sq mi (2.94 km^{2})
  - Water: 0.12 sq mi (0.30 km^{2})
- Elevation: 912 ft (278 m)

Population (2020)
  - Total: 101
  - Density: 88.9/sq mi (34.32/km^{2})
- Time zone: UTC-6 (Central (CST))
  - Summer (DST): UTC-5 (CDT)
- ZIP code: 50036
- Area code: 515
- FIPS code: 19-28920
- GNIS feature ID: 2394812

Fraser is a city in Dodge Township, Boone County, Iowa, United States. The population was 101 at the time of the 2020 census. It is part of the Boone, Iowa Micropolitan Statistical Area, which is a part of the larger Ames–Boone Combined Statistical Area. The city is located along the Des Moines River.

== History ==
Fraser was platted in 1893 by the Fraser Coal Company. Within a couple of decades, the coal mines were exhausted.

The Boone and Scenic Valley Railroad runs through the town.

== Geography ==
According to the United States Census Bureau, the city has a total area of 0.88 square miles (2.28 km^{2}), of which 0.83 square miles (2.15 km^{2}) is land and 0.05 square miles (0.13 km^{2}) is water.

== Demographics ==
Historical populations
Year	Pop.	±%
1910	537	—
1920	391	−27.2%
1930	309	−21.0%
1940	263	−14.9%
1950	219	−16.7%
1960	134	−38.8%
1970	143	+6.7%
1980	139	−2.8%
1990	120	−13.7%
2000	137	+14.2%
2010	102	−25.5%
2020	101	−1.0%
Source:"U.S. Census website". United States Census Bureau. and Iowa Data Center; Source: U.S. Decennial Census

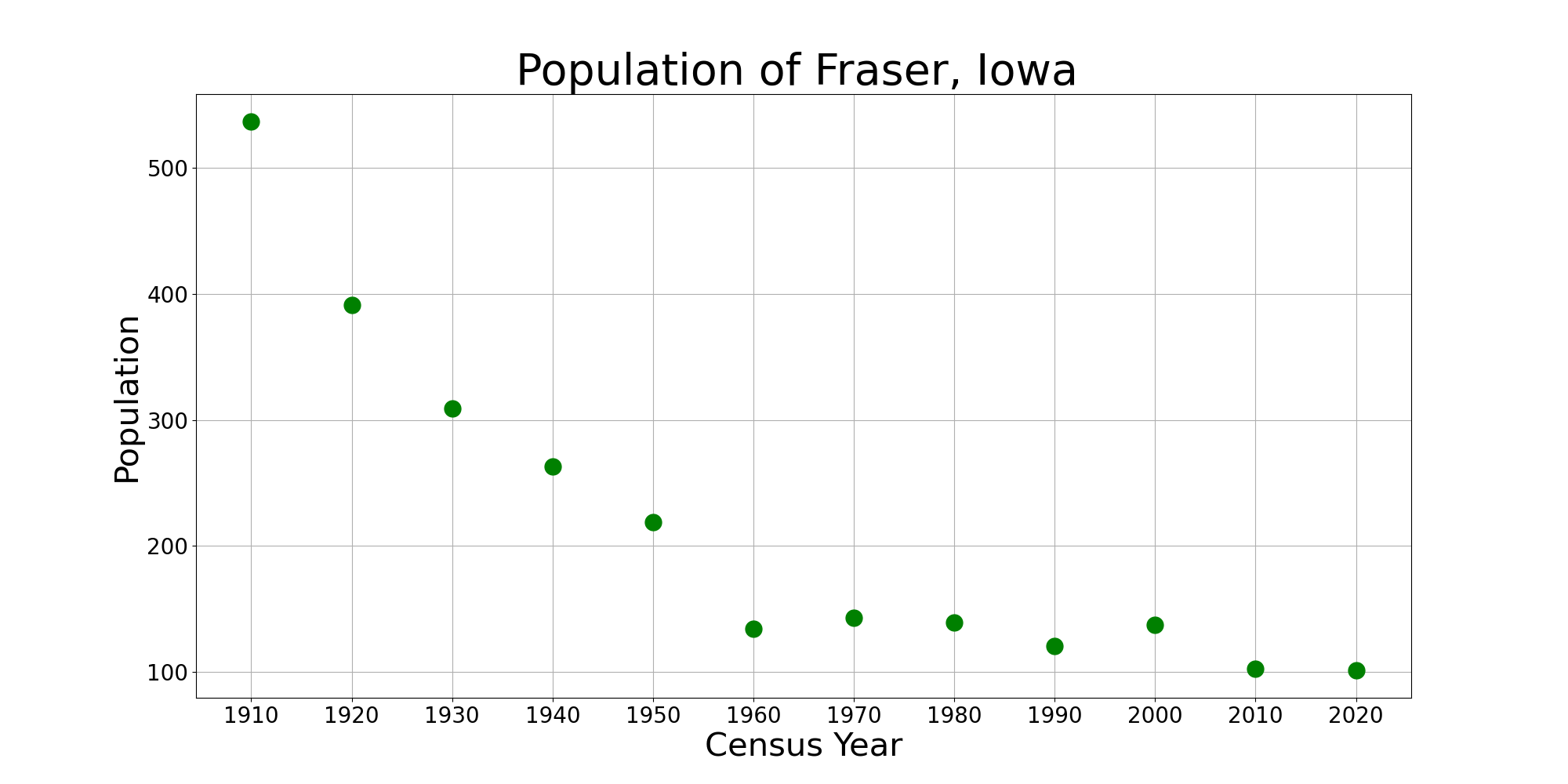
The population of Fraser, Iowa from US census data

=== 2020 census ===
As of the census of 2020, there were 101 people, 40 households, and 31 families residing in the city. The population density was 88.8 inhabitants per square mile (34.3/km^{2}). There were 49 housing units at an average density of 43.1 per square mile (16.6/km^{2}). The racial makeup of the city was 96.0% White, 0.0% Black or African American, 1.0% Native American, 0.0% Asian, 0.0% Pacific Islander, 0.0% from other races and 3.0% from two or more races. Hispanic or Latino persons of any race comprised 2.0% of the population.

Of the 40 households, 40.0% of which had children under the age of 18 living with them, 60.0% were married couples living together, 7.5% were cohabitating couples, 15.0% had a female householder with no spouse or partner present and 17.5% had a male householder with no spouse or partner present. 22.5% of all households were non-families. 17.5% of all households were made up of individuals, 7.5% had someone living alone who was 65 years old or older.

The median age in the city was 39.8 years. 16.8% of the residents were under the age of 20; 5.9% were between the ages of 20 and 24; 29.7% were from 25 and 44; 23.8% were from 45 and 64; and 23.8% were 65 years of age or older. The gender makeup of the city was 55.4% male and 44.6% female.

=== 2010 census ===
At the 2010 census there were 102 people in 43 households, including 29 families, in the city. The population density was 122.9 inhabitants per square mile (47.5/km^{2}). There were 63 housing units at an average density of 75.9 per square mile (29.3/km^{2}). The racial makup of the city was 98.0% White and 2.0% from two or more races.

Of the 43 households 23.3% had children under the age of 18 living with them, 51.2% were married couples living together, 7.0% had a female householder with no husband present, 9.3% had a male householder with no wife present, and 32.6% were non-families. 23.3% of households were one person and 7% were one person aged 65 or older. The average household size was 2.37 and the average family size was 2.79.

The median age was 45 years. 18.6% of residents were under the age of 18; 8.9% were between the ages of 18 and 24; 22.6% were from 25 to 44; 37.2% were from 45 to 64; and 12.7% were 65 or older. The gender makeup of the city was 51.0% male and 49.0% female.

=== 2000 census ===
At the 2000 census there were 137 people in 49 households, including 34 families, in the city. The population density was 164.8 inhabitants per square mile (63.6/km^{2}). There were 55 housing units at an average density of 66.2 per square mile (25.6/km^{2}). The racial makup of the city was 96.35% White, 2.19% Native American, 0.73% from other races, and 0.73% from two or more races. Hispanic or Latino of any race were 1.46%.

Of the 49 households 42.9% had children under the age of 18 living with them, 65.3% were married couples living together, 6.1% had a female householder with no husband present, and 28.6% were non-families. 20.4% of households were one person and 2.0% were one person aged 65 or older. The average household size was 2.80 and the average family size was 3.31.

The age distribution was 24.8% under the age of 18, 12.4% from 18 to 24, 29.9% from 25 to 44, 24.1% from 45 to 64, and 8.8% 65 or older. The median age was 38 years. For every 100 females, there were 110.8 males. For every 100 females age 18 and over, there were 110.2 males.

The median household income was $40,313 and the median family income was $46,250. Males had a median income of $30,000 versus $20,536 for females. The per capita income for the city was $14,454. There were 2.8% of families and 5.1% of the population living below the poverty line, including 6.3% of under eighteens and none of those over 64.

== Education ==
It is in the Southeast Valley Community School District. Southeast Valley High School in Gowrie is that district's comprehensive high school.

Fraser was a part of the Southeast Webster-Grand Community School District, established on July 1, 2005, by the merger of the Grand Community School District and the Southeast Webster Community School District. In 2023 Southeast Webster-Grand merged into the Southeast Valley district.
