= Union Township, Boone County, Iowa =

Township in Iowa, US

Union Township, Boone County
- Township
- Coordinates: 41°54′34″N 094°06′13″W
- Country: United States
- State: Iowa
- County: Boone

Area
  - Total: 36.2 sq mi (93.8 km^{2})
  - Land: 36.2 sq mi (93.8 km^{2})
  - Water: 0 sq mi (0 km^{2})
- Elevation: 1,007 ft (307 m)

Population (2000)
  - Total: 503
  - Density: 14/sq mi (5.4/km^{2})
- FIPS code: 19-94176
- GNIS feature ID: 0468810

Union Township is one of seventeen townships in Boone County, Iowa, United States. As of the 2000 census, its population was 503.

== History ==
Union Township was organized in 1856, by Judge John B. Montgomery.

== Geography ==
Union Township covers an area of 36.22 square miles (93.8 km^{2}) and contains one incorporated settlement, Berkley. According to the USGS, it contains two cemeteries: Fairview and Moore.
