= Boxholm, Iowa =

- City
- Location of Boxholm, Iowa
- Coordinates: 42°10′25″N 94°06′22″W
- Country: US
- State: Iowa
- County: Boone
- Township: Grant

Area
  - Total: 1.00 sq mi (2.60 km^{2})
  - Land: 1.00 sq mi (2.60 km^{2})
  - Water: 0 sq mi (0.00 km^{2})
- Elevation: 1,139 ft (347 m)

Population (2020)
  - Total: 181
  - Density: 180.4/sq mi (69.66/km^{2})
- Time zone: UTC-6 (Central (CST))
  - Summer (DST): UTC-5 (CDT)
- ZIP code: 50040
- Area code: 515
- FIPS code: 19-07750
- GNIS feature ID: 2394230

Boxholm is a city in Grant Township, Boone County, Iowa, United States. The population was 181 at the 2020 census. It is part of the Boone, Iowa Micropolitan Statistical Area, which is a part of the larger Ames-Boone, Iowa Combined Statistical Area.

== History ==
Boxholm was platted in 1900. The town takes its name from Boxholm, in Sweden, the native home of its first postmaster, John B. Anderson. Boxholm originally was built up chiefly by Swedes. The first town council was elected in August 1913, and the town was incorporated one month later. In 1963, the town celebrated its Golden Anniversary and the total attendance was estimated at over 1,200 people.

== Geography ==
According to the United States Census Bureau, the city has a total area of 1.02 square miles (2.64 km^{2}), all land.

== Demographics ==
Historical populations
Year	Pop.	±%
1920	296	—
1930	280	−5.4%
1940	285	+1.8%
1950	304	+6.7%
1960	250	−17.8%
1970	242	−3.2%
1980	267	+10.3%
1990	214	−19.9%
2000	215	+0.5%
2010	195	−9.3%
2020	181	−7.2%
Source:"U.S. Census website". United States Census Bureau. and Iowa Data Center; Source: U.S. Decennial Census

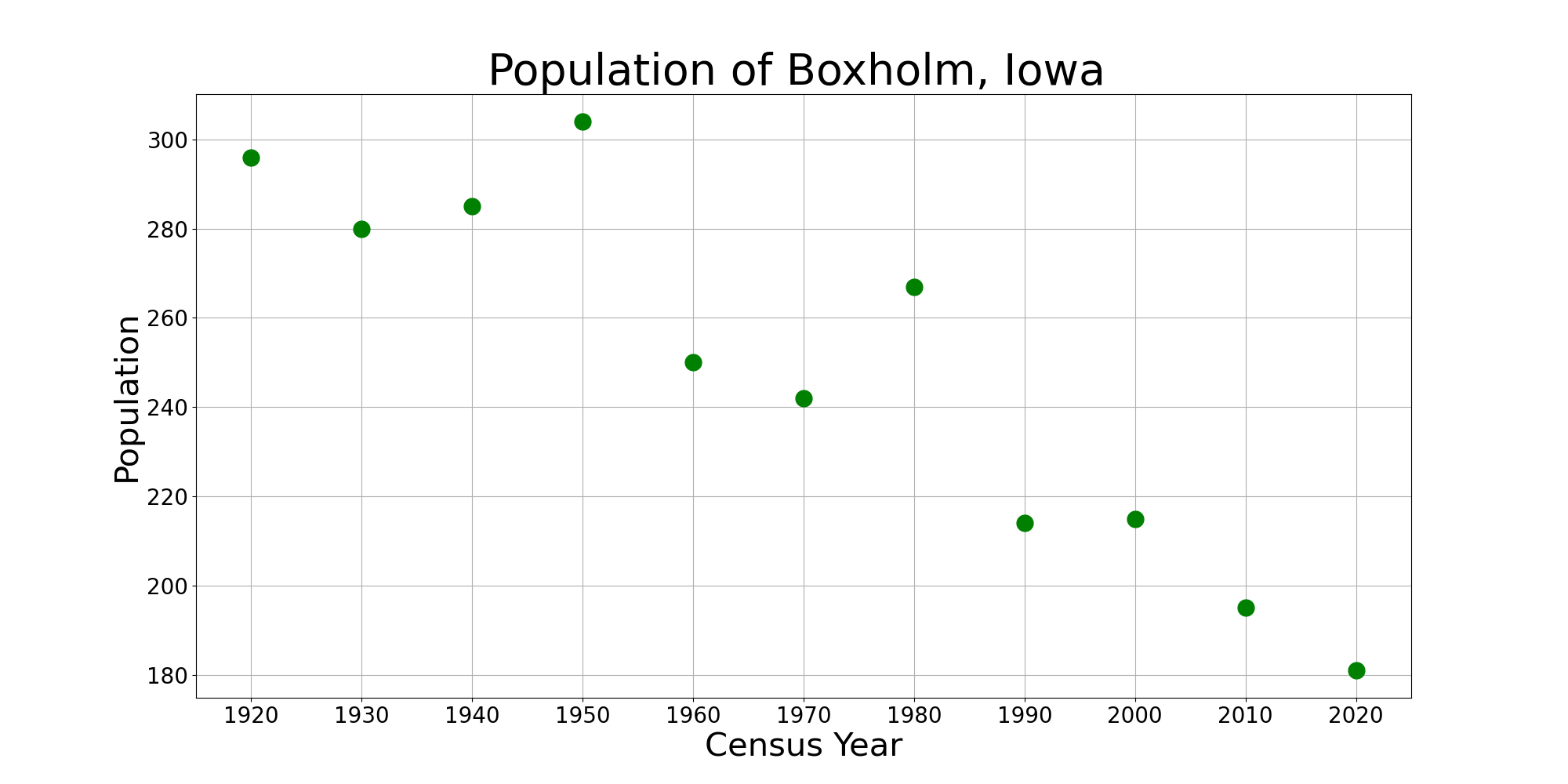
The population of Boxholm, Iowa from US census data

=== 2020 census ===
As of the census of 2020, there were 181 people, 85 households, and 50 families residing in the city. The population density was 180.4 inhabitants per square mile (69.7/km^{2}). There were 106 housing units at an average density of 105.7 per square mile (40.8/km^{2}). The racial makeup of the city was 93.4% White, 1.1% Black or African American, 1.1% Native American, 0.0% Asian, 0.0% Pacific Islander, 1.1% from other races and 3.3% from two or more races. Hispanic or Latino persons of any race comprised 0.0% of the population.

Of the 85 households, 27.1% of which had children under the age of 18 living with them, 38.8% were married couples living together, 10.6% were cohabitating couples, 21.2% had a female householder with no spouse or partner present and 29.4% had a male householder with no spouse or partner present. 41.2% of all households were non-families. 32.9% of all households were made up of individuals, 21.2% had someone living alone who was 65 years old or older.

The median age in the city was 40.3 years. 21.0% of the residents were under the age of 20; 5.5% were between the ages of 20 and 24; 27.1% were from 25 and 44; 28.2% were from 45 and 64; and 18.2% were 65 years of age or older. The gender makeup of the city was 50.8% male and 49.2% female.

=== 2010 census ===
As of the census of 2010, there were 195 people, 97 households, and 54 families living in the city. The population density was 191.2 inhabitants per square mile (73.8/km^{2}). There were 109 housing units at an average density of 106.9 per square mile (41.3/km^{2}). The racial makeup of the city was 99.0% White, 0.5% African American, and 0.5% from other races. Hispanic or Latino of any race were 1.5% of the population.

There were 97 households, of which 20.6% had children under the age of 18 living with them, 44.3% were married couples living together, 6.2% had a female householder with no husband present, 5.2% had a male householder with no wife present, and 44.3% were non-families. 38.1% of all households were made up of individuals, and 24.7% had someone living alone who was 65 years of age or older. The average household size was 2.01 and the average family size was 2.67.

The median age in the city was 48.8 years. 17.4% of residents were under the age of 18; 7.7% were between the ages of 18 and 24; 20.5% were from 25 to 44; 24.1% were from 45 to 64; and 30.3% were 65 years of age or older. The gender makeup of the city was 51.3% male and 48.7% female.

=== 2000 census ===
As of the census of 2000, there were 215 people, 103 households, and 63 families living in the city. The population density was 210.4 inhabitants per square mile (81.2/km^{2}). There were 108 housing units at an average density of 105.7 per square mile (40.8/km^{2}). The racial makeup of the city was 100.00% White. Hispanic or Latino of any race were 0.47% of the population.

There were 103 households, out of which 23.3% had children under the age of 18 living with them, 50.5% were married couples living together, 9.7% had a female householder with no husband present, and 37.9% were non-families. 35.9% of all households were made up of individuals, and 18.4% had someone living alone who was 65 years of age or older. The average household size was 2.09 and the average family size was 2.67.

In the city, the population was spread out, with 21.9% under the age of 18, 2.3% from 18 to 24, 26.0% from 25 to 44, 27.4% from 45 to 64, and 22.3% who were 65 years of age or older. The median age was 45 years. For every 100 females, there were 93.7 males. For every 100 females age 18 and over, there were 86.7 males.

The median income for a household in the city was $37,083, and the median income for a family was $38,750. Males had a median income of $33,333 versus $22,000 for females. The per capita income for the city was $18,503. About 7.8% of families and 7.5% of the population were below the poverty line, including 9.5% of those under the age of eighteen and 14.8% of those 65 or over.

== Education ==
It is in the Southeast Valley Community School District. Southeast Valley High School in Gowrie is that district's comprehensive high school.

Previously, Boxholm was a part of the Southeast Webster-Grand Community School District, established on July 1, 2005 by the merger of the Grand Community School District and the Southeast Webster Community School District. In 2023 that district merged into the Southeast Valley district.

At one point Boxholm had its own elementary school.
