= Kansas City Kitty =

1944 American romantic musical film directed by Del Lord

- Directed by: Del Lord
- Produced by: Ted Richmond
- Starring: Joan Davis; Jane Frazee
- Cinematography: Burnett Guffey
- Edited by: Gene Havlick
- Distributed by: Columbia Pictures
- Release date: August 24, 1944
- Running time: 71 minutes
- Country: United States
- Language: English

Kansas City Kitty is a 1944 American romantic musical film directed by Del Lord, starring Joan Davis and Jane Frazee. The film features the singing Williams Brothers, including the youngest of the quartet, Andy Williams. The film's copyright was renewed in 1971. (Note: Under R511863)

== Cast ==
- Joan Davis as Polly Jasper
- Bob Crosby as Jimmy
- Jane Frazee as Eileen Hasbrook
- Erik Rolf as Dr. Henry Talbot
- Tim Ryan as Dave Clark
- Robert Emmett Keane as Joe Lathim
- The Williams Brothers as Speciality Performers
- Ray Walker as Lawyer Simpson
- Johnny Bond (uncredited) as Chaps Wiliker
