= Amaqua Township, Iowa =

Township in Iowa, US

Amaqua Township, Boone County
- Township
- Coordinates: 42°05′07″N 094°06′40″W
- Country: United States
- State: Iowa
- County: Boone

Area
  - Total: 36.76 sq mi (95.21 km^{2})
  - Land: 36.75 sq mi (95.18 km^{2})
  - Water: 0.0077 sq mi (0.02 km^{2})
- Elevation: 1,102 ft (336 m)

Population (2000)
  - Total: 283
  - Density: 7.8/sq mi (3/km^{2})
- FIPS code: 19-90057
- GNIS feature ID: 0467391

Amaqua Township is one of seventeen townships in Boone County, Iowa, United States. As of the 2000 census, its population was 283.

== History ==
Amaqua Township was established in 1871. Amaqua is an Indian name meaning "beaver".

== Geography ==
Amaqua Township covers an area of 36.76 square miles (95.2 km^{2}) and contains one incorporated settlement, Beaver. According to the USGS, it contains four cemeteries: Beaver, Grand Ridge, Maas and Maple Grove.
