= Pilot Mound Township, Boone County, Iowa =

Township in Iowa, US

Pilot Mound Township, Boone County
- Township
- Coordinates: 42°09′54″N 094°00′36″W
- Country: United States
- State: Iowa
- County: Boone

Area
  - Total: 22.51 sq mi (58.31 km^{2})
  - Land: 22.30 sq mi (57.76 km^{2})
  - Water: 0.21 sq mi (0.55 km^{2})
- Elevation: 1,120 ft (340 m)

Population (2000)
  - Total: 400
  - Density: 18/sq mi (6.9/km^{2})
- FIPS code: 19-93330
- GNIS feature ID: 0468518

Pilot Mound Township is one of seventeen townships in Boone County, Iowa, United States. As of the 2000 census, its population was 400.

== History ==
Pilot Mound Township was organized in 1858. It takes its name from a prominent mound in the central part of the township.

== Geography ==
Pilot Mound Township covers an area of 22.52 square miles (58.3 km^{2}) and contains one incorporated settlement, Pilot Mound. According to the USGS, it contains four cemeteries: Bethel Owen, Runyan, Schlicht and Shafer-Gear.
