= Ogden, Iowa =

- City
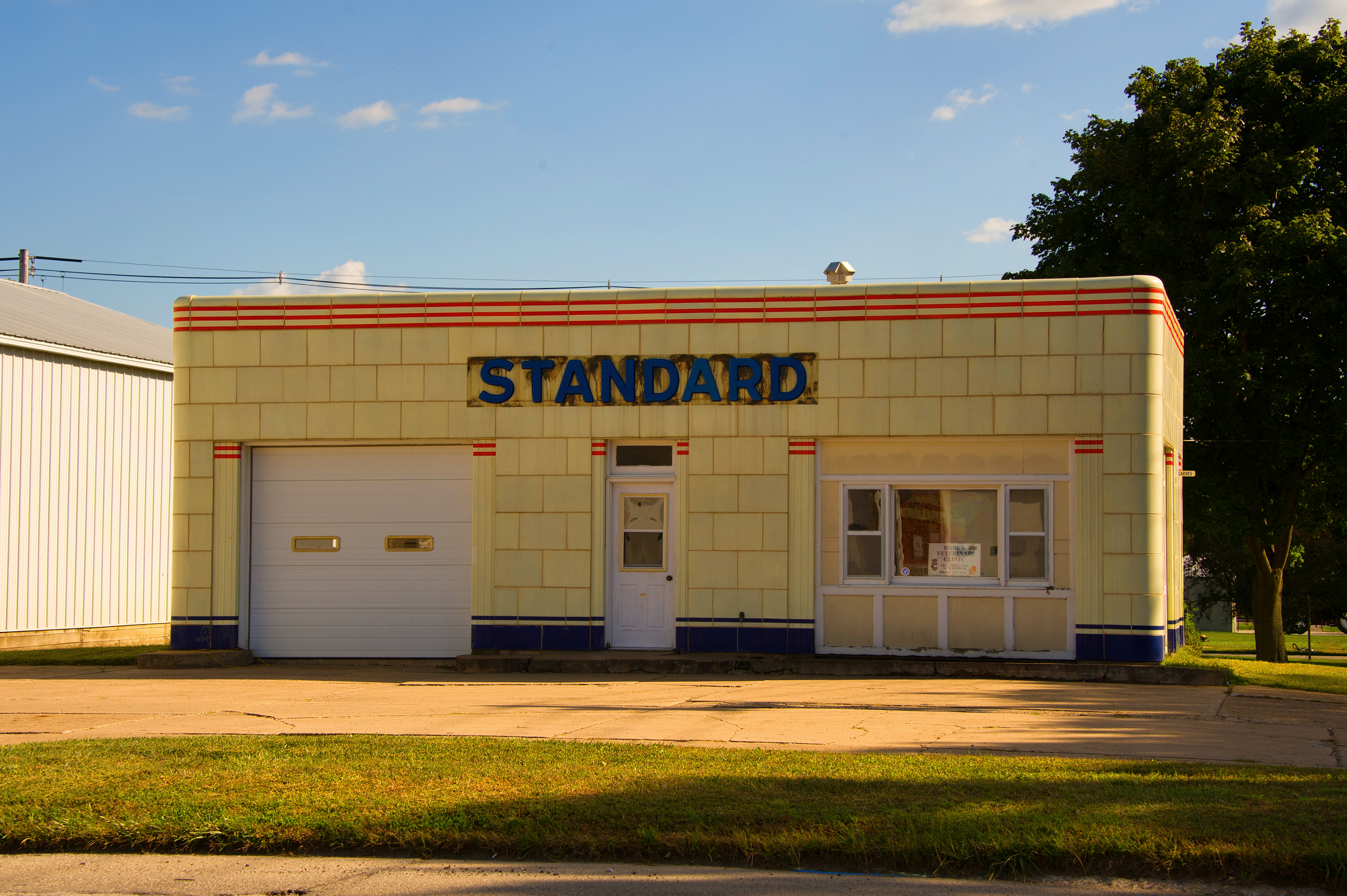
- An old Standard station in Ogden
- Motto: "Our City, make it yours"
- Location of Ogden, Iowa
- Coordinates: 42°02′22″N 94°01′42″W
- Country: US
- State: Iowa
- County: Boone
- Township: Yell

Area
  - Total: 1.37 sq mi (3.54 km^{2})
  - Land: 1.37 sq mi (3.54 km^{2})
  - Water: 0 sq mi (0.00 km^{2})
- Elevation: 1,106 ft (337 m)

Population (2020)
  - Total: 2,007
  - Density: 1,467.5/sq mi (566.59/km^{2})
- Time zone: UTC-6 (Central (CST))
  - Summer (DST): UTC-5 (CDT)
- ZIP code: 50212
- Area code: 515
- FIPS code: 19-58665
- GNIS feature ID: 2395306
- Website: www.ogdeniowa.org

Ogden is a city in Yell Township, Boone County, Iowa, United States. The population was 2,007 at the time of the 2020 census, down 1.8% from 2,044 in the 2010 census. It is part of the Boone, Iowa Micropolitan Statistical Area, which is a part of the larger Ames-Boone, Iowa Combined Statistical Area.

== History ==
Ogden was platted in 1866. The town is named for William B. Ogden, a railroad official and the first Mayor of Chicago. A post office has been in operation at Ogden since 1871. Ogden was incorporated in 1878.

== Geography ==
According to the United States Census Bureau, the city has a total area of 1.37 square miles (3.55 km^{2}), all land.

== Demographics ==
Historical populations
Year	Pop.	±%
1880	568	—
1890	689	+21.3%
1900	993	+44.1%
1910	1,298	+30.7%
1920	1,451	+11.8%
1930	1,429	−1.5%
1940	1,513	+5.9%
1950	1,486	−1.8%
1960	1,525	+2.6%
1970	1,661	+8.9%
1980	1,953	+17.6%
1990	1,909	−2.3%
2000	2,023	+6.0%
2010	2,044	+1.0%
2020	2,007	−1.8%
Source:"U.S. Census website". United States Census Bureau. and Iowa Data Center; Source: U.S. Decennial Census

=== 2020 census ===
As of the 2020 census, there were 2,007 people and 539 families residing in the city. The population density was 1,467.5 inhabitants per square mile (566.6/km^{2}). There were 907 housing units at an average density of 663.2 per square mile (256.1/km^{2}), of which 8.9% were vacant. The homeowner vacancy rate was 1.9% and the rental vacancy rate was 6.3%.

The median age in the city was 41.8 years. 23.3% of residents were under the age of 18, 25.9% were under the age of 20, 5.5% were between the ages of 20 and 24, 22.1% were from 25 to 44, 25.3% were from 45 to 64, and 21.3% were 65 years of age or older. The gender makeup of the city was 50.6% male and 49.4% female. For every 100 females there were 102.3 males, and for every 100 females age 18 and over there were 97.1 males age 18 and over. 0.0% of residents lived in urban areas, while 100.0% lived in rural areas.

There were 826 households, of which 30.5% had children under the age of 18 living in them. Of all households, 50.4% were married-couple households, 6.2% were cohabitating-couple households, 24.7% were households with a female householder and no spouse or partner present, and 18.8% were households with a male householder and no spouse or partner present. About 34.7% of all households were non-families, 29.6% were made up of individuals, and 14.3% had someone living alone who was 65 years of age or older.

Racial composition as of the 2020 census
Race	Number	Percent
White	1,933	96.3%
Black or African American	9	0.4%
American Indian and Alaska Native	7	0.3%
Asian	3	0.1%
Native Hawaiian and Other Pacific Islander	1	0.0%
Some other race	7	0.3%
Two or more races	47	2.3%
Hispanic or Latino (of any race)	29	1.4%

=== 2010 census ===
As of the census of 2010, there were 2,044 people, 829 households, and 580 families living in the city. The population density was 1,492.0 inhabitants per square mile (576.1/km^{2}). There were 904 housing units at an average density of 659.9 per square mile (254.8/km^{2}). The racial makeup of the city was 98.9% White, 0.3% Native American, 0.1% from other races, and 0.6% from two or more races. Hispanic or Latino of any race were 1.1% of the population.

There were 829 households, of which 32.6% had children under the age of 18 living with them, 57.3% were married couples living together, 8.4% had a female householder with no husband present, 4.2% had a male householder with no wife present, and 30.0% were non-families. 26.2% of all households were made up of individuals, and 13.1% had someone living alone who was 65 years of age or older. The average household size was 2.43 and the average family size was 2.91.

The median age in the city was 41.6 years. 24.8% of residents were under the age of 18; 6.4% were between the ages of 18 and 24; 23.3% were from 25 to 44; 26.7% were from 45 to 64; and 18.8% were 65 years of age or older. The gender makeup of the city was 49.1% male and 50.9% female.

=== 2000 census ===
As of the census of 2000, there were 2,023 people, 823 households, and 585 families living in the city. The population density was 1,472.3 inhabitants per square mile (568.5/km^{2}). There were 879 housing units at an average density of 639.7 per square mile (247.0/km^{2}). The racial makeup of the city was 99.01% White, 0.05% African American, 0.35% Native American, 0.10% Asian, 0.15% from other races, and 0.35% from two or more races. Hispanic or Latino of any race were 0.79% of the population.

There were 823 households, out of which 31.0% had children under the age of 18 living with them, 60.4% were married couples living together, 7.4% had a female householder with no husband present, and 28.9% were non-families. Of all households, 25.9% were made up of individuals, and 14.7% had someone living alone who was 65 years of age or older. The average household size was 2.41 and the average family size was 2.90.

24.6% are under the age of 18, 7.2% from 18 to 24, 26.3% from 25 to 44, 22.2% from 45 to 64, and 19.7% who were 65 years of age or older. The median age was 39 years. For every 100 females, there were 89.2 males. For every 100 females age 18 and over, there were 84.1 males.

The median income for a household in the city was $41,114, and the median income for a family was $46,949. Males had a median income of $32,054 versus $22,679 for females. The per capita income for the city was $19,542. About 1.2% of families and 2.9% of the population were below the poverty line, including 1.7% of those under age 18 and 3.4% of those age 65 or over.

== Transportation ==
Ogden is located on U.S. Route 30. The original Lincoln Highway (Walnut St.) ran through the center of town, but a new four-lane highway was built in 1965 that bypassed Ogden immediately south of town. The original pour for Hwy 30 was resurfaced in Ogden's business district. One notable aspect are the footprints in the cement that were evident towards the western edge of the business district - Walnut & 6th St. - where they crossed the roadway. A section, which features the footprints, was removed prior to the resurfacing work and are preserved in downtown Ogden U.S. Route 169 (First St.) intersected with Hwy 30 at Walnut St. until Hwy 30 was relocated south of town. The presence of these two main routes benefitted Ogden's businesses which thrived from all the traffic these two roadways brought through the town.

The east/west line of the former Chicago & North Western railroad (a key link between Chicago and the western US) - now Union Pacific - ran through town parallel to U.S. 30. A depot was maintained in Ogden when the C&NW provided passenger service prior to 1956 along that line. The C&NW merged with the Union Pacific in 1995. Railway Express Agency had an office in the depot which brought freight and parcel services to Ogden also.

== Economy ==
- Unemployment rate

3.6% (6% USA)

- Recent job growth

-5.8% (-6.2% USA)

- Future job growth

21.1% (33.5% USA)

- Sales taxes

7.00% (7.3% USA)

- Income per capita

$33,469 ($37,638 USA)

- Household income

$55,852 ($69,021)

== Education ==
Children in Ogden, Iowa attend the Ogden Community School District. The school system is made up of an elementary school building and a combined middle/high school building. The school district is the largest employer in the town.

== Notable people ==
- Mike Banks, football player in the NFL
- Brooklyn Supreme (1928–1948), world-record setting heaviest horse
- Ralph Zollinger, adventurer, soldier, and journalist
