= Jackson Township, Boone County, Iowa =

Township in Iowa, US

Jackson Township, Boone County
- Township
- Coordinates: 42°04′55″N 093°46′01″W
- Country: United States
- State: Iowa
- County: Boone

Area
  - Total: 36.75 sq mi (95.19 km^{2})
  - Land: 36.75 sq mi (95.17 km^{2})
  - Water: 0.0077 sq mi (0.02 km^{2})
- Elevation: 1,053 ft (321 m)

Population (2000)
  - Total: 582
  - Density: 16/sq mi (6.1/km^{2})
- FIPS code: 19-92094
- GNIS feature ID: 0468092

Jackson Township is one of seventeen townships in Boone County, Iowa, United States. As of the 2000 census, its population was 582.

== History ==
Jackson Township was established in 1857.

== Geography ==
Jackson Township covers an area of 36.75 square miles (95.2 km^{2}) and contains no incorporated settlements. According to the USGS, it contains one cemetery, Mitchell.
