= Kate Shelley High Bridge =

Bridge in United States of America

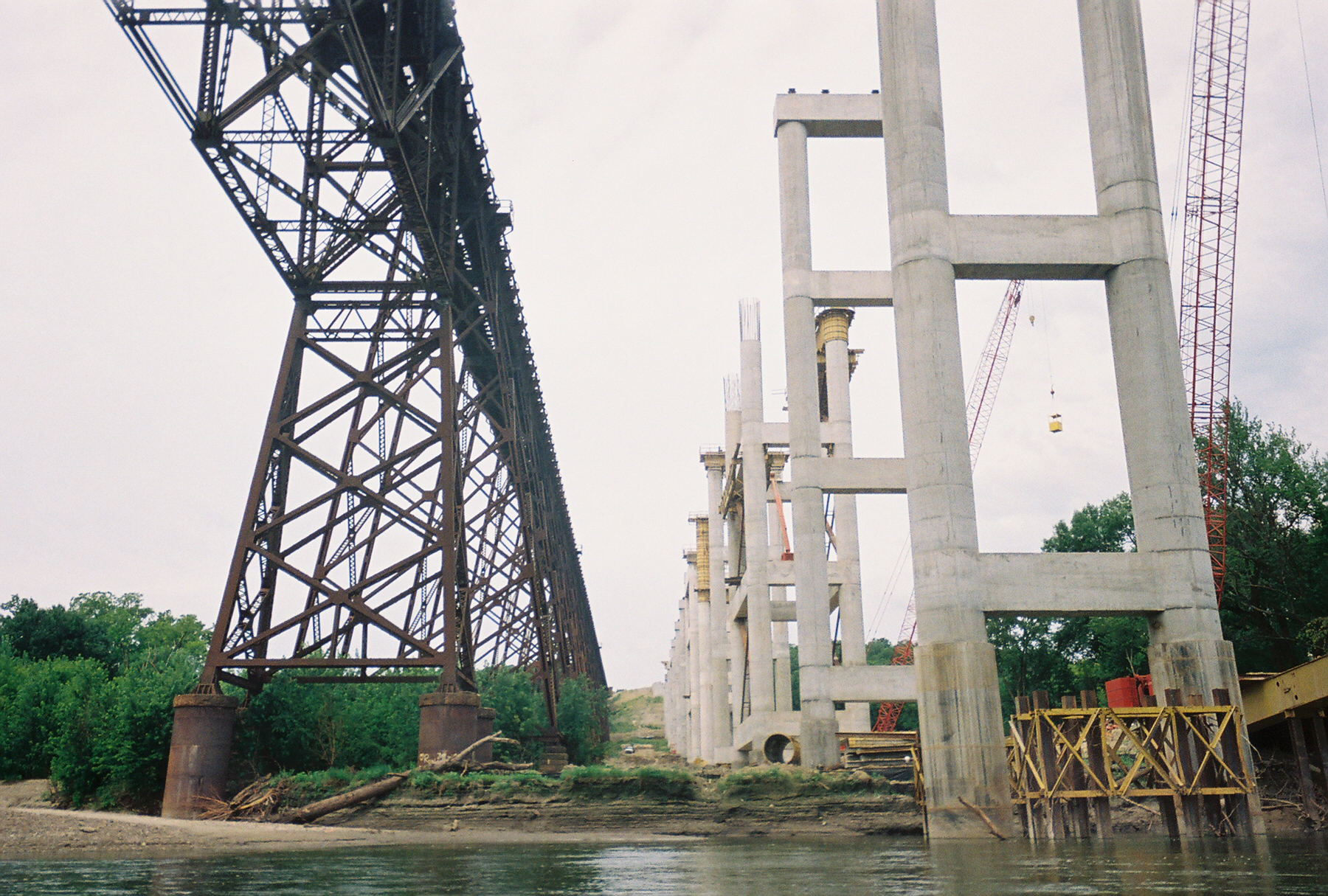
- Original bridge (left), new bridge(right)
- Coordinates: 42°03′32″N 93°58′12″W
- Carries: Freight trains
- Crosses: Des Moines River
- Locale: Boone, Iowa, U.S.
- Maintained by: Union Pacific

Characteristics
- Material: Steel
- Total length: 2,685 ft (818 m)
- Height: 185 ft (56 m)
- Piers in water: 8-16

History
- Designer: George S. Morison
- Construction start: 1899
- Construction end: 1901
- Closed: 2009
- Boone Viaduct
- U.S. National Register of Historic Places
- Location within Iowa Location within the United States
- Architect: George S. Morison
- NRHP reference No.: 78001207
- Added to NRHP: November 17, 1978

Location
- Interactive map of Kate Shelley High Bridge

The Kate Shelley High Bridge, officially called the Boone Viaduct when it was completed in 1901, is one of the highest and longest double-track railroad bridges in the United States. It is located approximately 3 miles (4.8 km) west of Boone, Iowa.

It was nicknamed after the Iowa railroad heroine, Catherine Carroll Shelley, better known as Kate Shelley. On July 6, 1881, when she was 15 years old, Kate Shelley risked her life to warn the Chicago and North Western Railway that the Honey Creek bridge was out. A "pusher" train had fallen through the bridge near her home. Kate heard the accident and knew the train schedules, so Kate attempted to save a passenger train scheduled to travel over the Honey Creek bridge by crossing the Des Moines River Bridge near her Moingona home. It was night, during a raging thunderstorm. Wearing only her nightdress and armed with a lantern, she crossed the bridge on her hands and knees. She made it to the station and saved the train. She then led rescuers back to save the men who had fallen from Honey Creek Bridge. Of the four men who fell, two were saved, one was found dead, and the fourth was never found, presumed to be dead. In some versions of the tale, Kate was 17 years old, asserting that the birthdate on her own gravestone is inaccurate. They also claim the passenger train had already stopped, but no actual evidence has been presented proving either of those two disputed facts. Her bravery was heralded in many newspapers. Kate's lantern is housed at the Boone County Historical Society Museum in Boone, IA

The bridge was designed by George S. Morison for the Chicago and North Western Railway and was constructed from 1899 to 1901. It stands 185 feet (56 m) above the Des Moines River and is 2,685 feet (818 m) long. The bridge was never officially renamed for Kate Shelley, but there were many commemorations there to honor her as if it carried that name. Gradually it became better known as the Kate Shelley High Bridge, or just the Kate Shelley Bridge, and the popularity of the Boone Viaduct name faded.

== History ==
By the mid-1950s, traffic on the bridge was limited to one train at a time. In 1986, some of the bridge towers were damaged in a wind storm. Union Pacific Railroad is the current owner of the bridge, and starting in 2001, they undertook an inspection and repair program; this resulted in both tracks being opened again, but with a 25-mile-per-hour (40 km/h) slow order.

The bridge is located on an east/west Union Pacific main line—the Overland Route—connecting Chicago to the west coast.

== New bridge ==
From 2006 to 2009, Union Pacific constructed a new double track concrete and steel bridge next to the old span. During construction, the bridge was lengthened 160 feet (49 m) to the east due to instability of the bank caused by heavy rains in Spring 2008; this delayed completion by at least eight months. The bridge opened to traffic on August 20, 2009, when the Union Pacific ran its first train across the new span. The UP officially named the new viaduct the Kate Shelley Bridge. The new bridge can handle two trains simultaneously at 70 mph (110 km/h), and at 2,813 feet (857 m) long and 190 feet (58 m) high, the new bridge is longer and slightly taller than the original. The original bridge was left in place.

== Name confusion ==
In addition to the Boone Viaduct (completed 1901), a.k.a. the Kate Shelley High Bridge, and the Union Pacific Kate Shelley Bridge (completed 2009), at least two other bridges have been occasionally called the Kate Shelley (Shelly) bridge. The bridge at Moingona that Kate crossed was sometimes referred to as the Kate Shelly Bridge before the Boone Viaduct was complete. A new steel bridge was built to replace the old wooden Moingona one in 1894. The small stone bridge over Honey Creek near her house, where the pusher engine crashed, was also occasionally called the Kate Shelley (Shelly) Bridge.

There were and have been many high trestles (Trestle bridges) in Boone County, such as the Boone & Scenic Valley Railroad's Bass Point High Bridge.

== See also ==
- List of bridges documented by the Historic American Engineering Record in Iowa

New Kate Shelley Bridge
- Coordinates: 42°03′32″N 93°58′12″W
- Carries: Heavy rail
- Crosses: Des Moines River
- Locale: Boone, Iowa
- Maintained by: Union Pacific

Characteristics
- Material: Concrete and steel
- Total length: 2,813 ft (857 m)
- Height: 190 ft (58 m)

History
- Construction start: 2006
- Construction end: 2009
- Opened: 2009

Location
- Interactive map of New Kate Shelley Bridge
