= Beaver Creek (Des Moines River tributary) =

Location
- Country: US
- State: Iowa

Physical characteristics
- Source
  - location: Boone County, IA, US
- Mouth
  - location: Johnston, Polk County, Iowa, US
  - coordinates: 41.6518°N 93.6683°W
- Discharge
  - location: Grimes, Iowa
  - average: 244 cu/ft. per sec.

Beaver Creek is a tributary of the Des Moines River that rises at the northern border of Boone County in the U.S. state of Iowa, and then flows generally south and southeast through western Boone County, northeastern Dallas County, and finally northwestern Polk County before flowing into the Des Moines River approximately a mile south of the Saylorville Reservoir in Polk County. In total, the main channel is approximately 77 miles (124 km) in length, and the watershed drains approximately 380 square miles (980 km^{2}).

Significant tributaries to Beaver Creek include Middle Beaver Creek, East Beaver Creek, West Beaver Creek, Slough Creek, Beaver Branch, Jim Creek and two Little Beaver creeks. There are also numerous smaller unnamed tributaries.

== History ==
Beaver Creek is an English translation of the Native American name. The North American beaver was found on the stream until the 1850s. Beaver Creek is the source of the names of two local townships: Beaver Township, Boone County, Iowa and Amaqua Township, Boone County, Iowa, "Amaqua" meaning "beaver" in an Indian language.

== See also ==
- List of rivers of Iowa
