= Boone County, Iowa =

County in Iowa, United States

- County
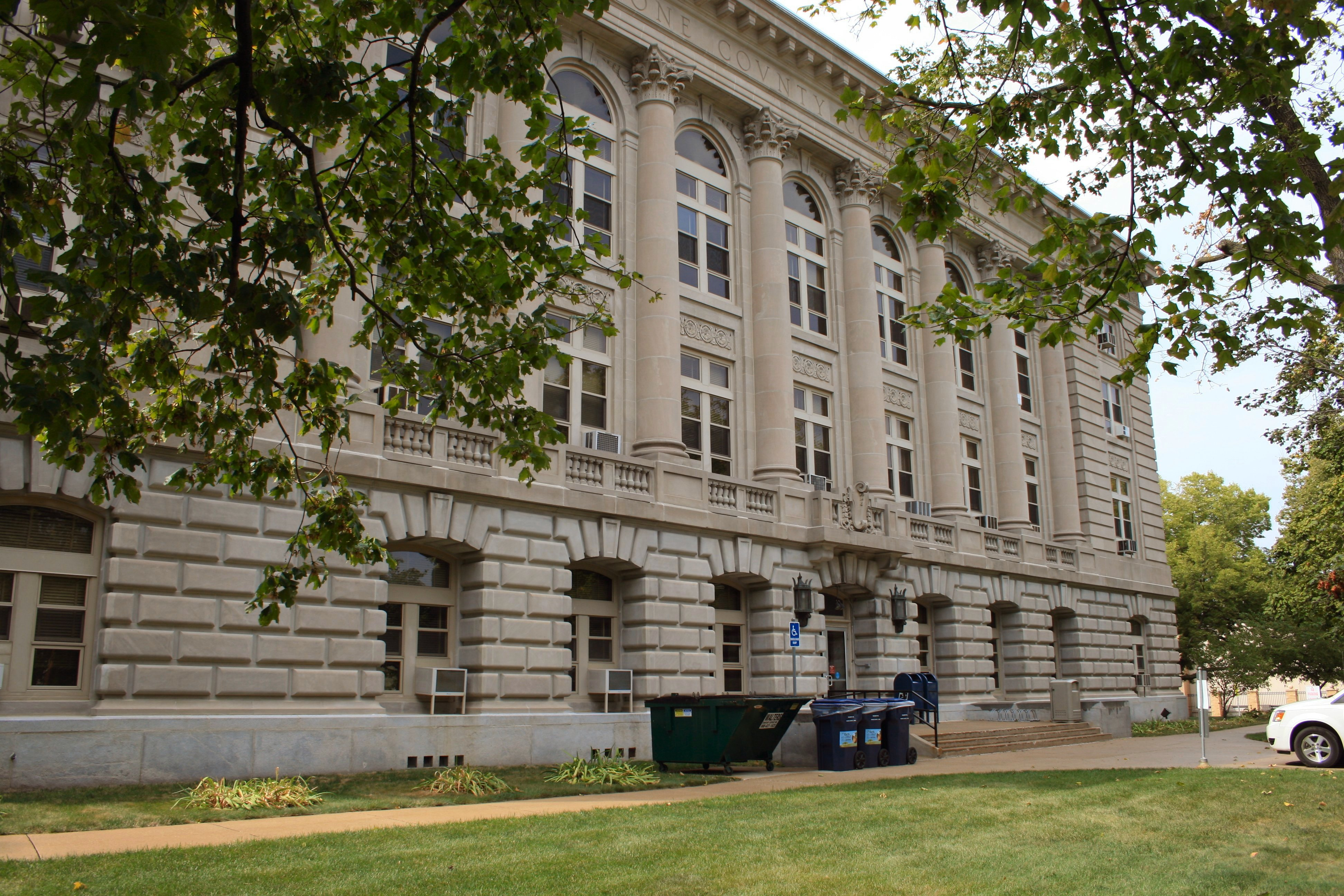
- Boone County Courthouse

- Seal

- Location within the U.S. state of Iowa
- Coordinates: 42°02′11″N 93°55′56″W
- Country: United States
- State: Iowa
- Founded: January 13, 1846
- Seat: Boone
- Largest city: Boone

Area
  - Total: 574 sq mi (1,490 km^{2})
  - Land: 572 sq mi (1,480 km^{2})
  - Water: 2.1 sq mi (5.4 km^{2}) 0.4%

Population (2020)
  - Total: 26,715
  - Estimate (2025): 26,799 ▲
  - Density: 46.7/sq mi (18.0/km^{2})
- Time zone: UTC−6 (Central)
  - Summer (DST): UTC−5 (CDT)
- Congressional district: 4th
- Website: www.boonecounty.iowa.gov
- Iowa county number 08

Boone County is a county in the U.S. state of Iowa. As of the 2020 census, the population was 26,715. Its county seat is Boone. Boone County comprises the Boone, IA Micropolitan Statistical Area, which is included in the Des Moines-Ames-West Des Moines, IA Combined Statistical Area.

== History ==
The land that now forms Boone and several other Iowa counties was ceded by the Sac and Fox nation to the United States in a treaty signed on October 11, 1842.

On January 13, 1846, the legislative body of the Indiana Territory authorized creation of twelve counties in the Iowa Territory, with general descriptions of their boundaries. Boone County's name referred to Captain Nathan Boone, son of Daniel Boone, an American pioneer who formed the Wilderness Trail and founded the settlement of Boonesborough, Kentucky.

County residents selected Boonesboro as the county seat in 1851. The first building erected in the new settlement was a double log house, to be used as interim county office and courthouse. It was supplemented by a two–story building erected in 1856, then replaced by a three-story building in 1868.

The nearby settlement of Montana was incorporated in 1866, when a railway station was built there. It was renamed to Boone in 1871. It continued to grow, and it annexed the settlement of Boonesboro (which had also been incorporated in 1866) in 1887, thus becoming the county seat.

After the second courthouse became too small for the county's expanding populace, a new building (the present courthouse) replaced it. It was completed in 1917.

== Geography ==
According to the U.S. Census Bureau, the county has a total area of 574 square miles (1,490 km^{2}), of which 572 square miles (1,480 km^{2}) is land and 2.1 square miles (5.4 km^{2}) (0.4%) is water.

=== Major highways ===
- U.S. Highway 30 – runs east–west through center of county. Passes Beaver, Ogden, and Jordan.
- U.S. Highway 169 – runs south from Webster County through the west-central portion of Boone County. At its intersection with US 30, U.S. 169 runs east three miles to Ogden, then runs south to Dallas County.
- Iowa Highway 17 – runs south through eastern Boone County to Jordan, west one mile, then south to the boundary line between Dallas and Polk counties.
- Iowa Highway 144 – runs across the southwest tip of the county from northwest to southeast.
- Iowa Highway 210 – enters south line of county at Woodward, then runs east and east-northeast across the southern portion of county to Story County.

=== Adjacent counties ===
- Dallas County – south
- Greene County – west
- Hamilton County – north and northeast
- Polk County – south and southeast
- Story County – east
- Webster County – north and northwest

== Demographics ==
Historical population
Census	Pop.	Note	%±
1850	735		—
1860	4,232		475.8%
1870	14,584		244.6%
1880	20,838		42.9%
1890	23,772		14.1%
1900	28,200		18.6%
1910	27,626		−2.0%
1920	29,892		8.2%
1930	29,271		−2.1%
1940	29,782		1.7%
1950	28,139		−5.5%
1960	28,037		−0.4%
1970	26,470		−5.6%
1980	26,184		−1.1%
1990	25,186		−3.8%
2000	26,224		4.1%
2010	26,306		0.3%
2020	26,715		1.6%
2025 (est.)	26,799	▲	0.3%
U.S. Decennial Census; 1790-1960 1900-1990; 1990-2000 2010-2018

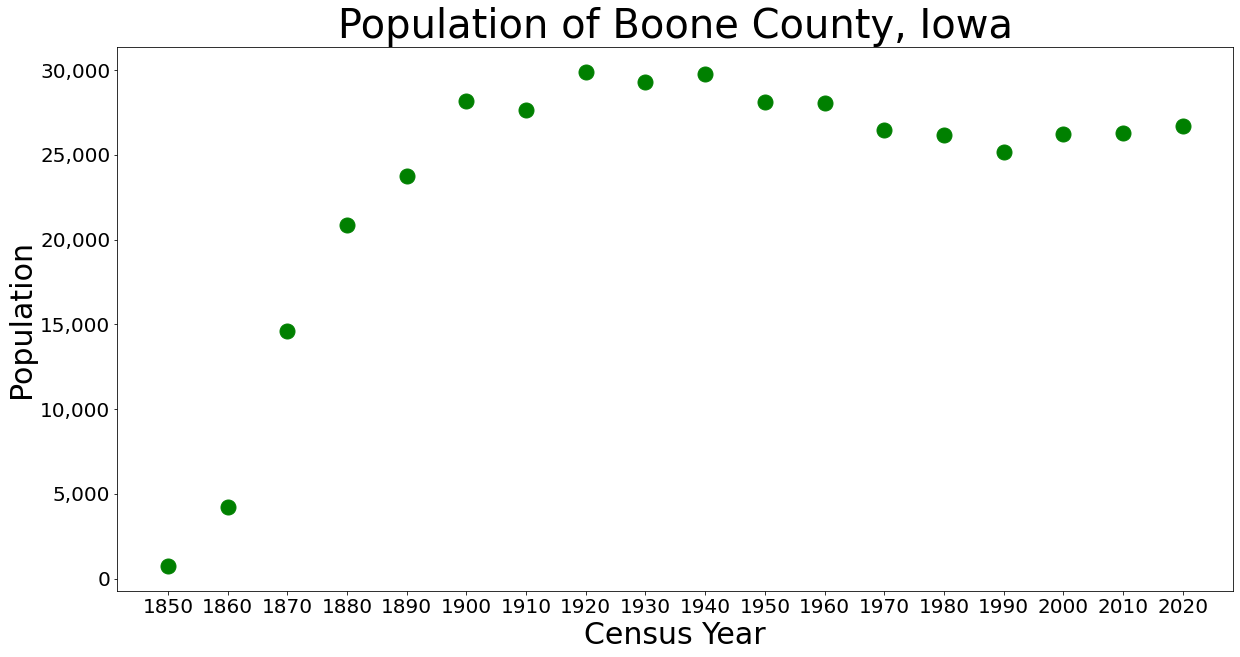
Population of Boone County from US census data

=== 2020 census ===
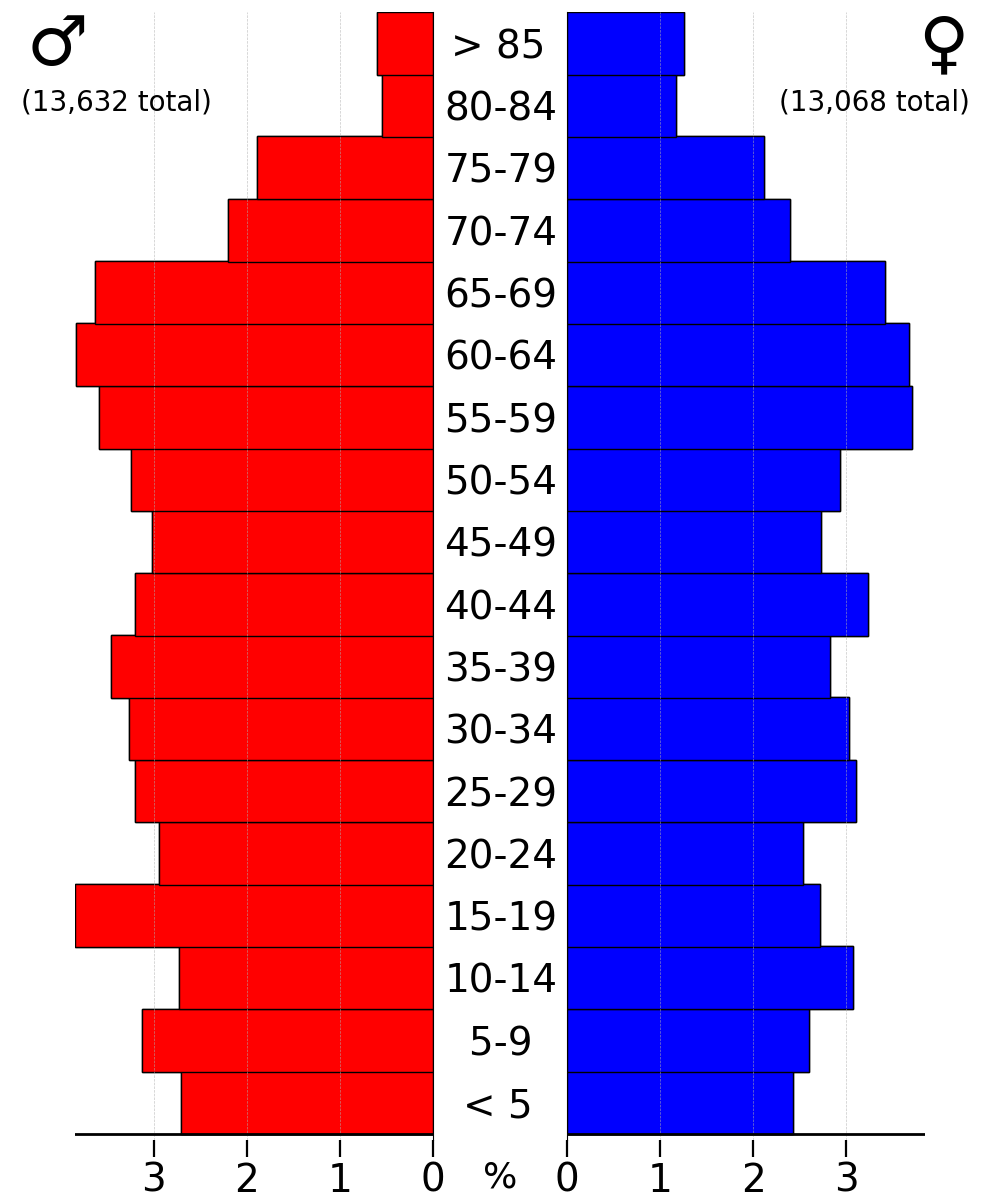
2022 US Census population pyramid for Boone County from ACS 5-year estimates

As of the 2020 census, the county had a population of 26,715 and a population density of 46.4/sq mi (17.9/km^{2}). The median age was 41.8 years; 23.1% of residents were under the age of 18 and 20.1% of residents were 65 years of age or older. For every 100 females there were 100.6 males, and for every 100 females age 18 and over there were 97.4 males age 18 and over.

46.8% of residents lived in urban areas, while 53.2% lived in rural areas.

The racial makeup of the county was 93.4% White, 1.1% Black or African American, 0.2% American Indian and Alaska Native, 0.4% Asian, <0.1% Native Hawaiian and Pacific Islander, 0.9% from some other race, and 3.9% from two or more races. Hispanic or Latino residents of any race comprised 2.7% of the population.

There were 10,981 households in the county, of which 28.5% had children under the age of 18 living in them. Of all households, 52.8% were married-couple households, 18.2% were households with a male householder and no spouse or partner present, and 22.3% were households with a female householder and no spouse or partner present. About 28.7% of all households were made up of individuals and 12.8% had someone living alone who was 65 years of age or older.

There were 11,921 housing units, of which 7.9% were vacant. Among occupied housing units, 77.7% were owner-occupied and 22.3% were renter-occupied. The homeowner vacancy rate was 1.8% and the rental vacancy rate was 9.9%.

=== 2010 census ===
The 2010 census recorded a population of 26,306 in the county, with a population density of 46.1/sq mi (17.8/km^{2}). There were 11,756 housing units, of which 10,728 were occupied.

=== 2000 census ===
As of the census of 2000, there were 26,224 people, 10,374 households, and 7,137 families residing in the county. The population density was 46 people per square mile (18 people/km^{2}). There were 10,968 housing units at an average density of 19 units per square mile (7.3 units/km^{2}). The racial makeup of the county was 98.53% White, 0.36% Black or African American, 0.20% Native American, 0.22% Asian, 0.26% from other races, and 0.43% from two or more races. 0.83% of the population were Hispanic or Latino of any race.

There were 10,374 households, out of which 31.20% had children under the age of 18 living with them, 58.00% were married couples living together, 7.80% had a female householder with no husband present, and 31.20% were non-families. 26.70% of all households were made up of individuals, and 11.80% had someone living alone who was 65 years of age or older. The average household size was 2.44 and the average family size was 2.95.

In the county, the population was spread out, with 24.80% under the age of 18, 8.40% from 18 to 24, 27.10% from 25 to 44, 23.30% from 45 to 64, and 16.40% who were 65 years of age or older. The median age was 39 years. For every 100 females there were 95.90 males. For every 100 females age 18 and over, there were 91.70 males.

The median income for a household in the county was $40,763, and the median income for a family was $49,346. Males had a median income of $32,504 versus $23,838 for females. The per capita income for the county was $19,943. About 4.50% of families and 7.60% of the population were below the poverty line, including 8.00% of those under age 18 and 5.90% of those age 65 or over.

== Communities ==
=== Cities ===
- Beaver
- Berkley
- Boone (county seat)
- Boxholm
- Fraser
- Luther
- Madrid
- Ogden
- Woodward (partial)
- Pilot Mound
- Sheldahl (partial)

=== Unincorporated communities ===
- Angus
- Centerville
- Coal Valley
- Jordan
- Logansport
- Mackey
- Moingona
- Ridgeport
- Wolf
- Zenorsville

=== Townships ===
- Amaqua
- Beaver
- Cass
- Colfax
- Des Moines
- Dodge
- Douglas
- Garden
- Grant
- Harrison
- Jackson
- Marcy
- Peoples
- Pilot Mound
- Union
- Worth
- Yell

=== Population ranking ===
The population ranking of the following table is based on the 2020 census of Boone County. † county seat

Rank	City/Town/etc.	Municipal type	Population (2020 Census)	Population (2024 Estimate)
1	† Boone	City	12,460	12,489
2	Madrid	City	2,802	2,832
3	Ogden	City	2,007	1,982
4	Boxholm	City	181	193
5	Pilot Mound	City	163	168
6	Luther	City	152	165
7	Fraser	City	101	95
8	Beaver	City	46	41
9	Berkley	City	23	16
10	Sheldahl (partially in Polk and Story Counties)	City	19 (297 total)	19 (326 total)

== Politics ==
Prior to 1932, Boone County was primarily Republican in presidential elections, aside from 1912 when the county backed Bull Moose candidate & former Republican President Theodore Roosevelt. From 1932 to 1980, the county was a swing county, voting for the national winner in all elections in that period aside from 1960. From 1984 to 2012, the county was consistently Democratic in presidential elections, but swung hard in 2016 by 20.7 points to back Republican Donald Trump similar to many other counties in Iowa. In Republican presidential primaries, it holds the distinction of having the longest streak of voting against the future nominee, having done so since the 1980 primary.

United States presidential election results for Boone County, Iowa
Year	Republican		Democratic		Third party(ies)	
Year	No.	%	No.	%	No.	%
1896	3,741	56.43%	2,801	42.25%	88	1.33%
1900	4,151	61.58%	2,264	33.59%	326	4.84%
1904	3,830	65.66%	1,148	19.68%	855	14.66%
1908	3,368	57.71%	1,958	33.55%	510	8.74%
1912	802	13.64%	1,601	27.23%	3,477	59.13%
1916	2,955	52.41%	2,338	41.47%	345	6.12%
1920	7,093	71.07%	2,240	22.44%	647	6.48%
1924	4,980	45.57%	702	6.42%	5,246	48.01%
1928	7,521	70.01%	3,049	28.38%	172	1.60%
1932	3,694	38.00%	5,293	54.44%	735	7.56%
1936	4,110	35.34%	7,080	60.88%	439	3.78%
1940	5,227	41.92%	7,168	57.49%	74	0.59%
1944	4,868	44.24%	6,062	55.09%	73	0.66%
1948	4,183	40.92%	5,541	54.21%	498	4.87%
1952	7,901	61.03%	4,896	37.82%	150	1.16%
1956	6,740	53.65%	5,815	46.28%	9	0.07%
1960	6,761	53.97%	5,759	45.97%	7	0.06%
1964	3,543	31.26%	7,699	67.92%	93	0.82%
1968	5,260	47.40%	5,219	47.03%	617	5.56%
1972	6,271	54.29%	5,057	43.78%	223	1.93%
1976	5,413	44.14%	6,595	53.78%	255	2.08%
1980	5,732	47.42%	5,126	42.41%	1,229	10.17%
1984	5,746	46.80%	6,485	52.82%	46	0.37%
1988	4,381	37.49%	7,232	61.89%	73	0.62%
1992	4,148	33.95%	5,913	48.39%	2,158	17.66%
1996	4,293	36.27%	6,446	54.47%	1,096	9.26%
2000	5,625	45.92%	6,270	51.19%	354	2.89%
2004	6,870	49.04%	7,027	50.16%	112	0.80%
2008	6,293	45.17%	7,356	52.80%	282	2.02%
2012	6,556	45.57%	7,512	52.21%	320	2.22%
2016	7,484	52.72%	5,541	39.03%	1,171	8.25%
2020	8,695	56.68%	6,303	41.09%	342	2.23%
2024	9,199	59.72%	5,895	38.27%	309	2.01%

== Education ==
School districts include:

- Ballard Community School District
- Boone Community School District
- Gilbert Community School District
- Greene County Community School District
- Madrid Community School District
- North Polk Community School District
- Ogden Community School District
- Perry Community School District
- Roland–Story Community School District
- South Hamilton Community School District
- Southeast Valley Community School District
- Stratford Community School District
- United Community School District
- Woodward-Granger Community School District

On July 1, 2023, Southeast Webster-Grand Community School District merged into the Southeast Valley Community School District.

== See also ==
- Boone County Courthouse (Iowa)
- National Register of Historic Places listings in Boone County, Iowa
- Don Williams County Park
