= National Register of Historic Places listings in Wright County, Iowa =

Location of Wright County in Iowa

This is intended to be a complete list of the properties and districts on the National Register of Historic Places in Wright County, Iowa, United States. Latitude and longitude coordinates are provided for many National Register properties and districts; these locations may be seen together in a map.

There are 8 properties and districts listed on the National Register in the county, including one National Historic Landmark. Two properties were formerly listed on the National Register.

This National Park Service list is complete through NPS recent listings posted May 1, 2026.

	Name on the Register	Image	Date listed	Location	City or town	Description
1	Boone River Bridge	Boone River Bridge	May 15, 1998 (#98000457)	Buchanan Ave. over the Boone River; 42°51′26″N 93°56′46″W	Goldfield	
2	Burlington, Cedar Rapids & Northern Passenger Depot-Dows	Burlington, Cedar Rapids & Northern Passenger Depot-Dows	January 7, 1993 (#92001744)	200 Railroad St. 42°39′28″N 93°29′59″W	Dows	
3	Burlington, Cedar Rapids and Northern Railroad Passenger Station	Burlington, Cedar Rapids and Northern Railroad Passenger Station	June 23, 1988 (#88000926)	302 S. Main; 42°43′48″N 93°43′59″W	Clarion	
4	Cornelia Lake Bridge		May 15, 1998 (#98000455)	Over an inlet of Cornelia Lake; 42°47′31″N 93°41′38″W	Clarion	
5	Eagle Grove Public Library	Eagle Grove Public Library	November 22, 1977 (#77000569)	401 W. Broadway; 42°39′51″N 93°54′24″W	Eagle Grove	
6	Fillmore Block	Fillmore Block	November 20, 1998 (#98001323)	Junction of Ellsworth and Garfield; 42°39′23″N 93°29′59″W	Dows	
7	Quasdorf Blacksmith and Wagon Shop	Quasdorf Blacksmith and Wagon Shop	January 21, 1994 (#93001545)	Junction of Train and W. Railroad Sts. 42°39′25″N 93°29′57″W	Dows	
8	Wright County Courthouse	Wright County Courthouse	July 2, 1981 (#81000277)	Central Ave. 42°43′56″N 93°43′55″W	Clarion	

== Former listings ==
	Name on the Register	Image	Date listed	Date removed	Location	City or town	Description
1	Exchange Building		April 12, 1982 (#82002649)	September 23, 1987	Ellsworth St.	Dows	
2	Goldfield Bridge	Goldfield Bridge	May 15, 1998 (#98000456)	September 19, 2019	Oak St. over the Boone River; 42°44′14″N 93°55′29″W	Goldfield	Replaced in 2004

== See also ==
- List of National Historic Landmarks in Iowa
- National Register of Historic Places listings in Iowa
- Listings in neighboring counties: Franklin, Hamilton, Hancock, Hardin, Humboldt, Webster
