= National Register of Historic Places listings in Sanborn County, South Dakota =

Location of Sanborn County in South Dakota

This is a list of the National Register of Historic Places listings in Sanborn County, South Dakota.

This is intended to be a complete list of the properties on the National Register of Historic Places in Sanborn County, South Dakota, United States. The locations of National Register properties for which the latitude and longitude coordinates are included below, may be seen in a map.

There are 7 properties listed on the National Register in the county. Another property was once listed but has since been removed.

This National Park Service list is complete through NPS recent listings posted March 14, 2025.

== Current listings ==
	Name on the Register	Image	Date listed	Location	City or town	Description
1	St. Scholastica Catholic Church		June 2, 1994 (#94000567)	Western side of Fourth Street between Wisconsin and State Streets; 43°53′47″N 98°08′08″W	Letcher	
2	St. Scholastica Rectory		June 2, 1994 (#94000568)	Western side of Fourth Street between Wisconsin and State Streets; 43°53′47″N 98°08′07″W	Letcher	
3	Site 39SB15	Site 39SB15	February 1, 1984 (#84003384)	Address Restricted	Mitchell	
4	Site 39SB18	Site 39SB18	February 1, 1984 (#84003397)	Address Restricted	Forestburg	
5	Site 39SB31	Site 39SB31	February 1, 1984 (#84003399)	Address Restricted	Forestburg	
6	South Dakota Dept. of Transportation Bridge No. 56-090-096		December 9, 1993 (#93001310)	Local road over Sand Creek; 44°03′40″N 98°09′03″W	Forestburg	Replaced between 2006 and 2008
7	Woonsocket State Bank		February 14, 2002 (#02000024)	201 South Dumont Avenue; 44°03′10″N 98°16′34″W	Woonsocket	

== Former listing ==
	Name on the Register	Image	Date listed	Date removed	Location	City or town	Description
1	South Dakota Department of Transportation Bridge No. 56-117-123		December 9, 1993 (#93001311)	March 26, 2008		Forestburg	
2	South Dakota Department of Transportation Bridge No. 56-174-090		December 9, 1993 (#93001312)	December 15, 1999	Local road over Redstone Creek	Artesian vicinity	

== See also ==
- List of National Historic Landmarks in South Dakota
- National Register of Historic Places listings in South Dakota
