= Iowa Bridge Company =

Des Moines, Iowa builder of historic bridges

The Iowa Bridge Company was a company that designed and built many bridges that are listed on the U.S. National Register of Historic Places.

Works (credit) include:

- Boone Bridge 2, 1000 200th St. over Des Moines River, Boone, IA (Iowa Bridge Co.) NRHP-listed
- Boone River Bridge, Buchanan Ave. over Boone River, Goldfield, IA (Iowa Bridge Company) NRHP-listed
- Garretson Outlet Bridge, Co. Rd. K64 over Garretson Outlet Ditch, Whiting, IA (Iowa Bridge Co.) NRHP-listed
- Goldfield Bridge, Oak St. over Boone R., Goldfield, IA (Iowa Bridge Co.) NRHP-listed
- Lincoln Highway--West Beaver Creek Abandoned Segment, approximately 1 mi. E of Grand Junction between Chicago & Northwestern RR tracks and US 30, Grand Junction, IA (Iowa Bridge Co.) NRHP-listed
- Marsh Rainbow Arch Bridge, Highway N37, Lake City, IA (Iowa Bridge Co.) NRHP-listed
- Marsh Rainbow Arch Bridge, Spring St., Chippewa Falls, WI (Iowa Bridge Co.) NRHP-listed
- Miller Ree Creek Bridge, W edge of Miller, Miller, SD (Iowa Bridge Company) NRHP-listed
- North Skunk River Bridge, Co. Rd. G13 over North Skunk River, New Sharon, IA (Iowa Bridge Co, IA State Hwy Comm.) NRHP-listed
- Rockwell City Bridge, 270th St. over unnamed stream, Rockwell City, IA (Iowa Bridge Co.) NRHP-listed
- South Dakota Department of Transportation Bridge No. 06-129-020, local rd. over Big Sioux River, Bruce, SD (Iowa Bridge Co.) NRHP-listed
- South Dakota Department of Transportation Bridge No. 63-197-130, local rd. over E Fork of Vermillion River, Davis, SD (Iowa Bridge Co.) NRHP-listed
- South Dakota Department of Transportation Bridge No. 63-198-181, local rd. over East Fork of Vermillion R., Davis, SD (Iowa Bridge Co.) NRHP-listed
- South Dakota Department of Transportation Bridge No. 63-210-282, local rd. over east Fork of Vermillion R., Centerville, SD (Iowa Bridge Co) NRHP-listed
- South Dakota Dept. of Transportation Bridge No. 03-327-230, local rd. over Pearl Creek, Cavour, SD (Iowa Bridge Company) NRHP-listed
- South Dakota Dept. of Transportation Bridge No. 03-338-100, Local rd. over Shue Cr. Cavour SD (Iowa Bridge Co.) NRHP-listed
- South Dakota Dept. of Transportation Bridge No. 05-028-200, Local rd. over Choteau Cr. Perkins SD (Iowa Bridge Co.) NRHP-listed
- South Dakota Dept. of Transportation Bridge No. 05-032-170, Local rd. over Choteau Cr. Avon SD (Iowa Bridge Co.) NRHP-listed
- South Dakota Dept. of Transportation Bridge No. 05-138-080, Local rd. over Emanuel Cr. Tyndall SD (Iowa Bridge Co.) NRHP-listed
- South Dakota Dept. of Transportation Bridge No. 56-090-096, Local rd. over Sand Cr. Forestburg SD (Iowa Bridge Company) NRHP-listed
- South Dakota Dept. of Transportation Bridge No. 58-021-400, Local rd. over Turtle Cr. Tulare SD (Iowa Bridge Company) NRHP-listed
- South Dakota Dept. of Transportation Bridge No. 58-025-370, Local rd. over Turtle Cr., Tulare SD (Iowa Bridge Company) NRHP-listed
- South Dakota Dept. of Transportation Bridge No. 58-062-270, Local rd. over Turtle Cr., Redfield SD (Iowa Bridge Company) NRHP-listed
- South Dakota Dept. of Transportation Bridge No. 58-120-231, Local rd. over the James R., Redfield SD (Iowa Bridge Company) NRHP-listed
- South Dakota Dept. of Transportation Bridge No. 58-140-224, Local rd. over the James R., Redfield SD (Iowa Bridge Company) NRHP-listed
- South Dakota Dept. of Transportation Bridge No. 58-218-360, Local rd. over the James R., Frankfort SD (Iowa Bridge Company) NRHP-listed
