= Boone Bridge =

Boone Bridge may refer to any of the following bridges in the United States:

- Boone Bridge (Boone, Iowa), a former bridge over the Des Moines River southwest of Boone
- Boone Bridge (Oregon), a highway bridge over the Willamette River at Wilsonville, Oregon, United States.
- Boone Bridge 2, a bridge spanning the Des Moines River west of Boone, Iowa
- Boone River Bridge, a historic structure north of Goldfield, Iowa
- Daniel Boone Bridge, two highway bridges across the Missouri River in Missouri
