= South Dakota Department of Transportation Bridge No. 03-327-230 =

- South Dakota Dept. of Transportation Bridge No. 03-327-230
- U.S. National Register of Historic Places
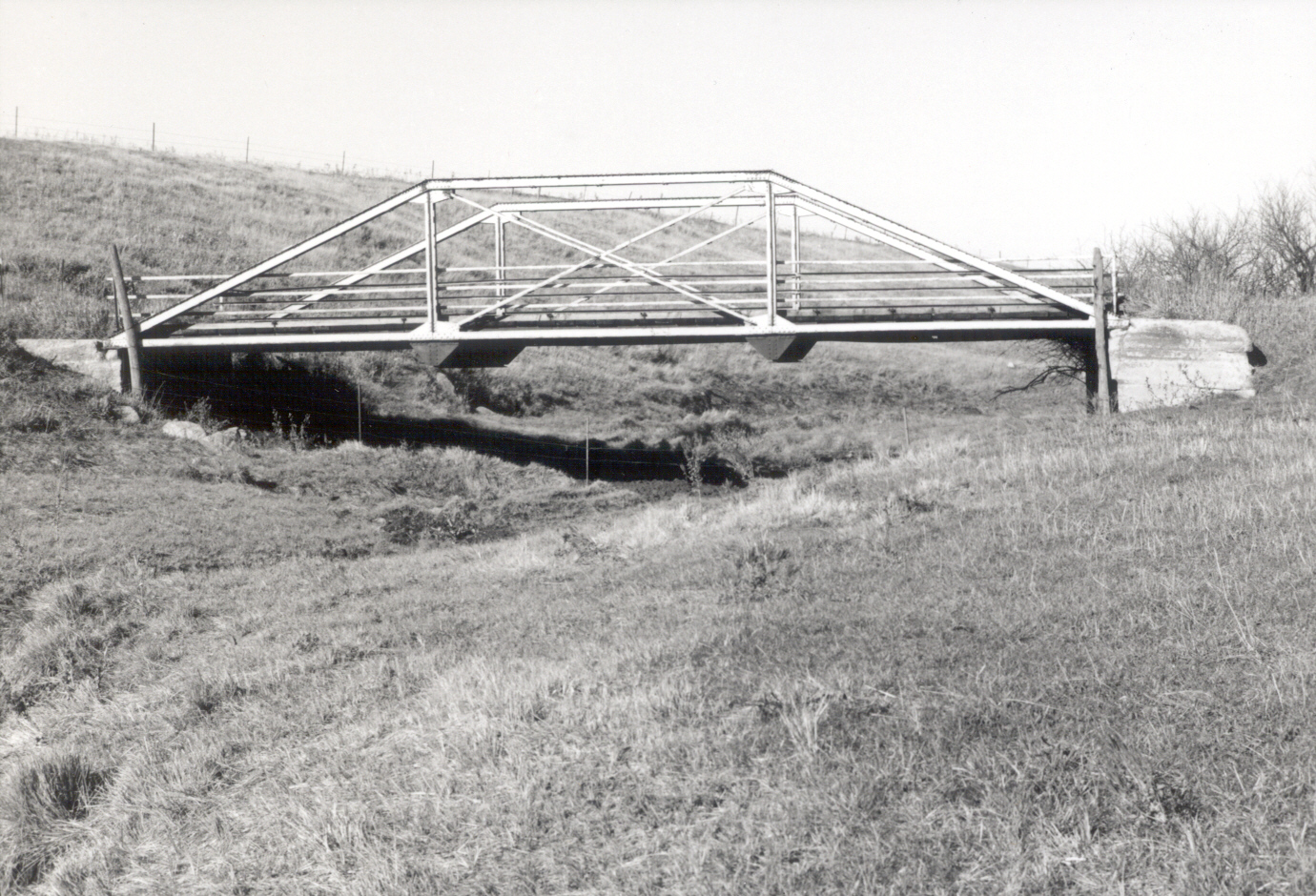

- Location within South Dakota Location within the United States
- Nearest city: Cavour, South Dakota
- Coordinates: 44°17′49″N 98°02′24″W
- Area: less than one acre
- Built: 1913
- Built by: Iowa Bridge Company
- Architectural style: Queen post pony Truss
- MPS: Historic Bridges in South Dakota MPS
- NRHP reference No.: 93001261
- Added to NRHP: December 9, 1993

The South Dakota Dept. of Transportation Bridge No. 03-327-230, in Beadle County, South Dakota near Cavour, was a Queen post pony truss bridge which was built in 1913. It was listed on the National Register of Historic Places in 1993.

It brought a local road over Pearl Creek about 5 miles (8.0 km) south of Cavour.

It was built by the Iowa Bridge Company. In 1993 it was the longest Queen post pony truss bridge with a known builder in South Dakota.

The bridge was removed and scrapped in 2016.

== Photos ==
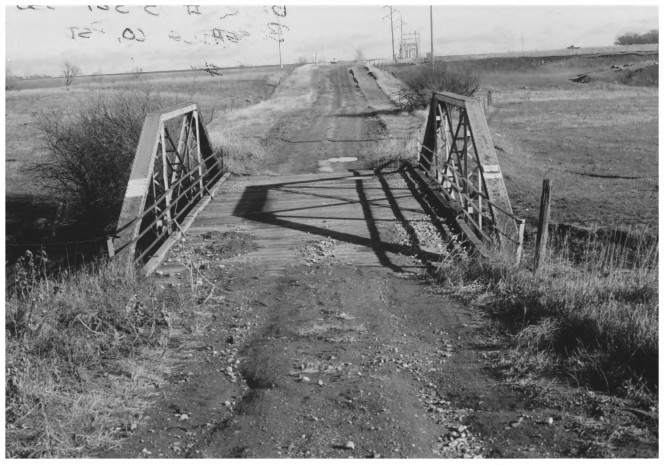
Bridge # 03-321-230 Beadle Co, Nov 1988
