= Eagle Grove, Iowa =

- City
- Location of Eagle Grove, Iowa
- Coordinates: 42°39′58″N 93°54′09″W
- Country: US
- State: Iowa
- County: Wright

Area
  - Total: 4.07 sq mi (10.55 km^{2})
  - Land: 4.07 sq mi (10.55 km^{2})
  - Water: 0 sq mi (0.00 km^{2})
- Elevation: 1,116 ft (340 m)

Population (2020)
  - Total: 3,601
  - Density: 884.4/sq mi (341.45/km^{2})
- Time zone: UTC-6 (Central (CST))
  - Summer (DST): UTC-5 (CDT)
- ZIP code: 50533
- Area code: 515
- FIPS code: 19-23250
- GNIS feature ID: 2394588
- Website: www.eaglegroveiowa.org

Eagle Grove is a city in Wright County, Iowa, United States. The population was 3,601 at the time of the 2020 census. Eagle Grove is the largest city in Wright County.

== History ==
Eagle Grove was platted in 1881. It was named from the eagle nests seen by early settlers in a nearby Oak tree grove perched above the bank of the Boone River. In 1851 Mr. N. B. Paine moved to Wright County, purchased property and constructed a log cabin that stood directly west of the grove. The nest was over six feet in diameter. The eagles settled in the nest in the spring and summer of 1855–56, However, in the spring of 1857 they were shot and killed by a trapper. Thus Eagle Grove was named in honour of these eagles.

On February 2, 1973, a natural gas explosion killed 13 people and leveled the Chatterbox Cafe and the neighboring Coast to Coast hardware store at the southeast corner of Broadway Street and Commerce Avenue.

== Geography ==
Eagle Grove is located near the Boone River.

According to the United States Census Bureau, the city has a total area of 4.04 square miles (10.46 km^{2}), all land.

=== Climate ===
Climate data for Eagle Grove, Iowa
Month	Jan	Feb	Mar	Apr	May	Jun	Jul	Aug	Sep	Oct	Nov	Dec	Year
Record high °F (°C)	66 (19)	67 (19)	86 (30)	96 (36)	100 (38)	102 (39)	103 (39)	102 (39)	98 (37)	94 (34)	80 (27)	67 (19)	103 (39)
Mean daily maximum °F (°C)	26 (−3)	32 (0)	44 (7)	59 (15)	72 (22)	81 (27)	84 (29)	82 (28)	75 (24)	62 (17)	45 (7)	30 (−1)	58 (14)
Mean daily minimum °F (°C)	7 (−14)	13 (−11)	25 (−4)	36 (2)	48 (9)	58 (14)	62 (17)	60 (16)	50 (10)	38 (3)	25 (−4)	11 (−12)	36 (2)
Record low °F (°C)	−32 (−36)	−30 (−34)	−25 (−32)	3 (−16)	21 (−6)	36 (2)	42 (6)	32 (0)	21 (−6)	12 (−11)	−18 (−28)	−26 (−32)	−32 (−36)
Average precipitation inches (mm)	0.60 (15)	0.80 (20)	2.03 (52)	3.63 (92)	4.69 (119)	5.36 (136)	4.42 (112)	3.82 (97)	3.17 (81)	2.26 (57)	1.74 (44)	1.19 (30)	33.71 (855)
Source: Weatherbase

== Demographics ==
Historical population
Year	Pop.	±%
1890	1,881	—
1900	3,557	+89.1%
1910	3,387	−4.8%
1920	4,433	+30.9%
1930	4,071	−8.2%
1940	4,024	−1.2%
1950	4,176	+3.8%
1960	4,381	+4.9%
1970	4,489	+2.5%
1980	4,324	−3.7%
1990	3,671	−15.1%
2000	3,712	+1.1%
2010	3,583	−3.5%
2020	3,601	+0.5%
Source: "U.S. Census website". United States Census Bureau. Source: U.S. Decennial Census

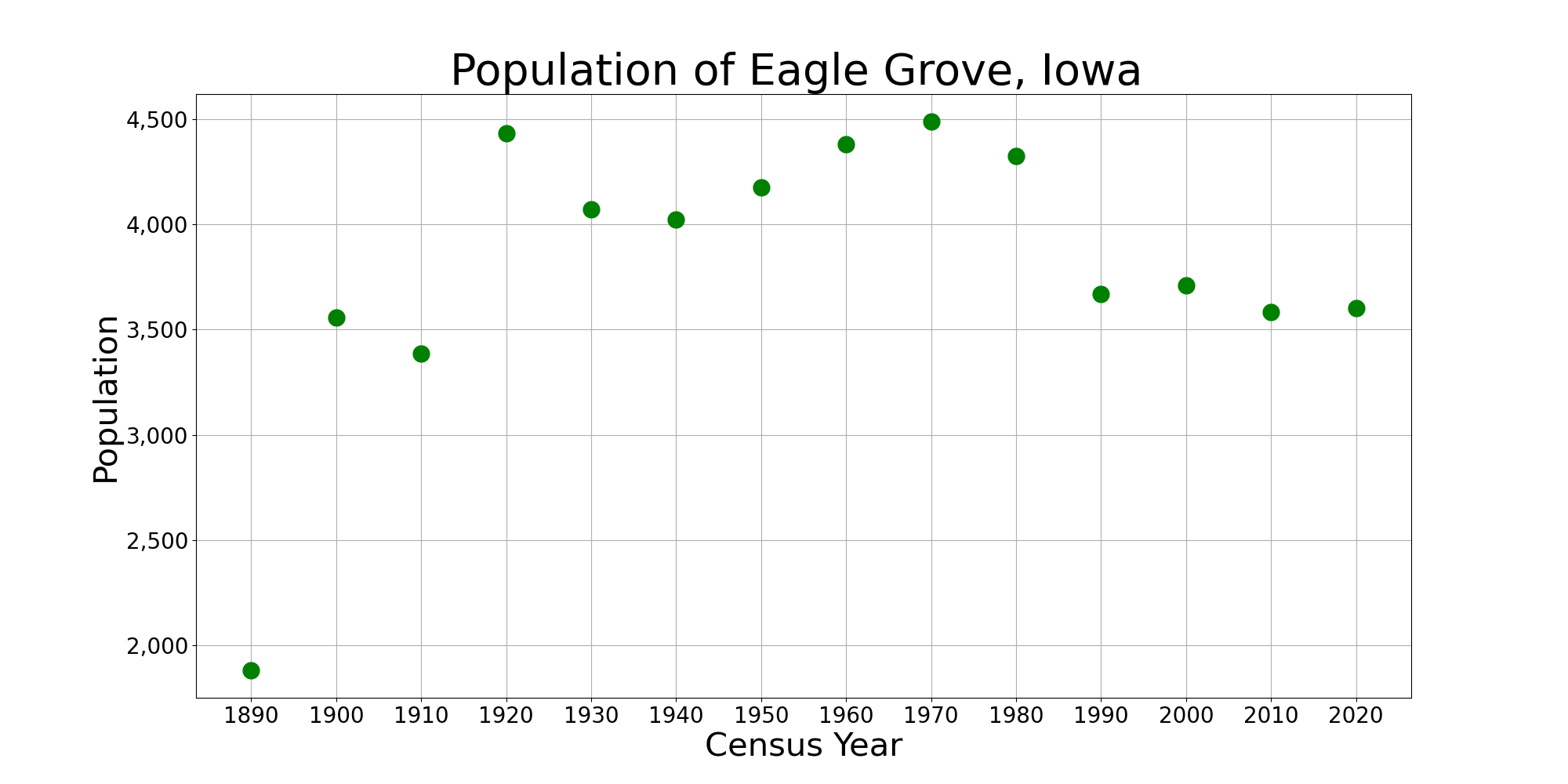
The population of Eagle Grove, Iowa from US census data

=== 2020 census ===
As of the 2020 census, Eagle Grove had a population of 3,601 people, with 1,445 households and 886 families residing in the city. The population density was 884.3 inhabitants per square mile (341.4/km^{2}). The median age was 35.9 years. 27.5% of residents were under the age of 18. For every 100 females, there were 96.7 males, and for every 100 females age 18 and over there were 99.1 males age 18 and over. 29.9% of residents were under the age of 20; 5.5% were from 20 to 24; 24.6% were from 25 to 44; 21.5% were from 45 to 64; and 18.6% were 65 years of age or older. The gender makeup of the city was 49.2% male and 50.8% female.

Of the 1,445 households, 30.4% had children under the age of 18 living in them. Of all households, 42.4% were married-couple households, 8.3% were cohabitating-couple households, 22.3% were households with a male householder and no spouse or partner present, and 27.0% were households with a female householder and no spouse or partner present. 38.7% of all households were non-families. About 32.3% of all households were made up of individuals and 16.1% had someone living alone who was 65 years of age or older.

There were 1,579 housing units at an average density of 387.8 per square mile (149.7/km^{2}), of which 8.5% were vacant. The homeowner vacancy rate was 1.5% and the rental vacancy rate was 9.5%.

0.0% of residents lived in urban areas, while 100.0% lived in rural areas.

Racial composition as of the 2020 census
Race	Number	Percent
White	2,718	75.5%
Black or African American	33	0.9%
American Indian and Alaska Native	26	0.7%
Asian	7	0.2%
Native Hawaiian and Other Pacific Islander	1	0.0%
Some other race	541	15.0%
Two or more races	275	7.6%
Hispanic or Latino (of any race)	893	24.8%

=== 2010 census ===
As of the census of 2010, there were 3,583 people, 1,500 households, and 924 families residing in the city. The population density was 886.9 inhabitants per square mile (342.4/km^{2}). There were 1,649 housing units at an average density of 408.2 units per square mile (157.6 units/km^{2}). The racial makeup of the city was 95.5% White, 0.7% African American, 0.1% Asian, 1.8% from other races, and 1.8% from two or more races. Hispanic or Latino of any race were 8.9% of the population.

There were 1,500 households, of which 29.6% had children under the age of 18 living with them, 44.7% were married couples living together, 11.1% had a female householder with no husband present, 5.9% had a male householder with no wife present, and 38.4% were non-families. 32.4% of all households were made up of individuals, and 15.9% had someone living alone who was 65 years of age or older. The average household size was 2.35 and the average family size was 2.92.

The median age in the city was 41 years. 24.3% of residents were under the age of 18; 8.4% were between the ages of 18 and 24; 21.7% were from 25 to 44; 26.3% were from 45 to 64; and 19.4% were 65 years of age or older. The gender makeup of the city was 49.0% male and 51.0% female.

=== 2000 census ===
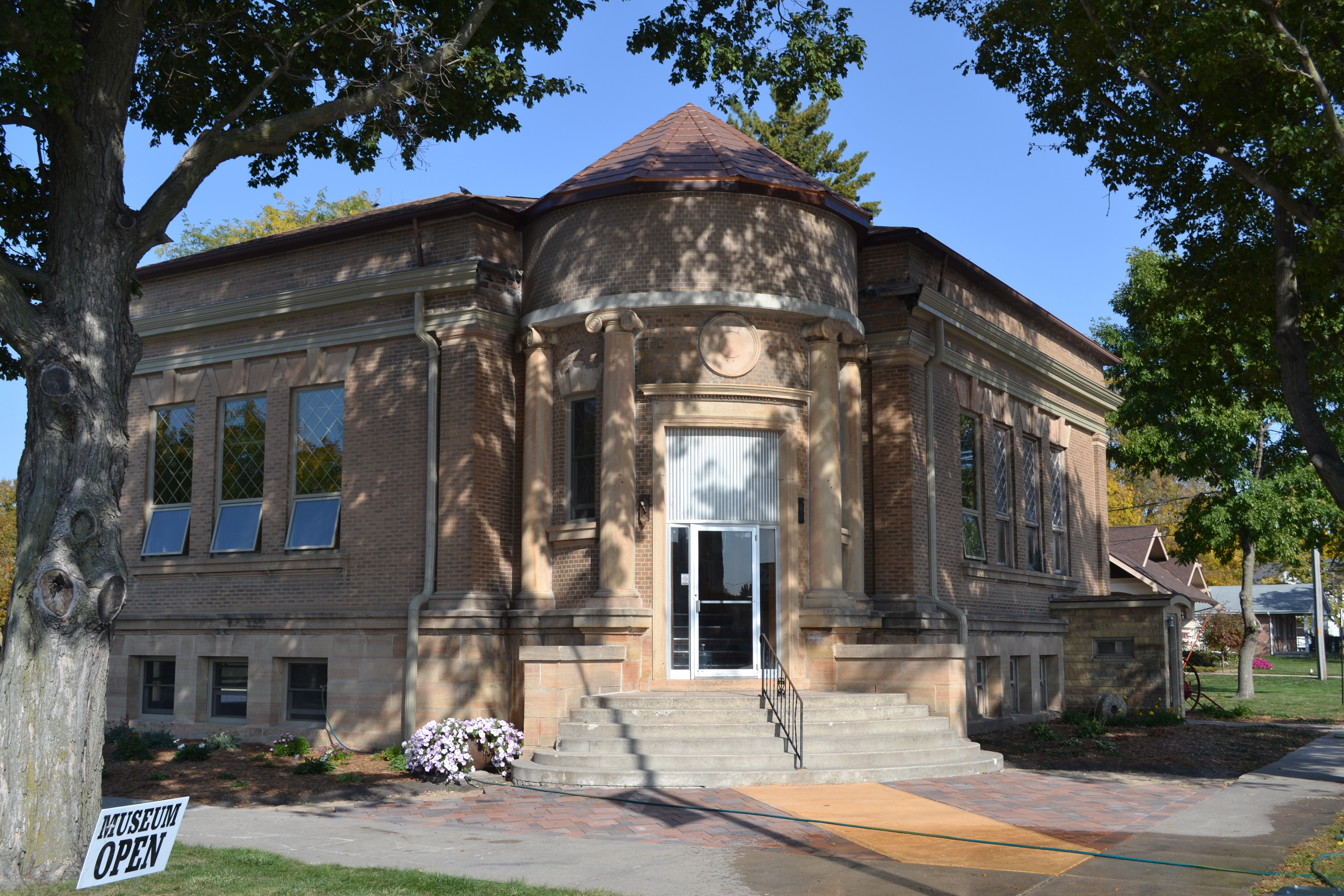
The Eagle Grove Public Library building is listed on the National Register of Historic Places

As of the census of 2000, there were 3,712 people, 1,511 households, and 994 families residing in the city. The population density was 936.1 inhabitants per square mile (361.4/km^{2}). There were 1,607 housing units at an average density of 405.3 units per square mile (156.5 units/km^{2}). The racial makeup of the city was 97.33% White, 0.16% African American, 0.05% Native American, 0.08% Asian, 1.35% from other races, and 1.02% from two or more races. Hispanic or Latino of any race were 2.05% of the population.

There were 1,511 households, out of which 29.8% had children under the age of 18 living with them, 53.7% were married couples living together, 8.5% had a female householder with no husband present, and 34.2% were non-families. 30.1% of all households were made up of individuals, and 14.9% had someone living alone who was 65 years of age or older. The average household size was 2.39 and the average family size was 2.96.

Age spread: 25.7% under the age of 18, 6.9% from 18 to 24, 25.1% from 25 to 44, 21.7% from 45 to 64, and 20.6% who were 65 years of age or older. The median age was 40 years. For every 100 females, there were 93.0 males. For every 100 females age 18 and over, there were 89.2 males.

The median income for a household in the city was $35,505, and the median income for a family was $42,757. Males had a median income of $30,930 versus $19,487 for females. The per capita income for the city was $20,563. About 2.8% of families and 5.7% of the population were below the poverty line, including 3.8% of those under age 18 and 6.0% of those age 65 or over.

== Arts and culture ==
Eagle Grove is one of the few non-county-seat towns in Iowa to be home of the county fair. The Wright County District Junior Fair is held in early July each summer in Greenwood Park and brings people from the region to Eagle Grove. Recent improvements have been made to the fair grounds as the Wright County Fair continues to expand.

== Education ==
The Eagle Grove Community School District serves children from PreK to 12th grade. The district covers area of Wright, Humboldt, and Webster counties, and serves the communities of Eagle Grove, Thor, Vincent, Woolstock, and the surrounding rural areas. There are 836 students in grades K-12. The district has built a new P/K-4 elementary school attached to the middle school after approving a bond referendum.

=== School sports ===
Eagle Grove High School is a member of the Iowa High School Athletic Association and competes in an athletic conference called the Top of Iowa Conference. The conference consists of 18 schools that are in 1A & 2A.

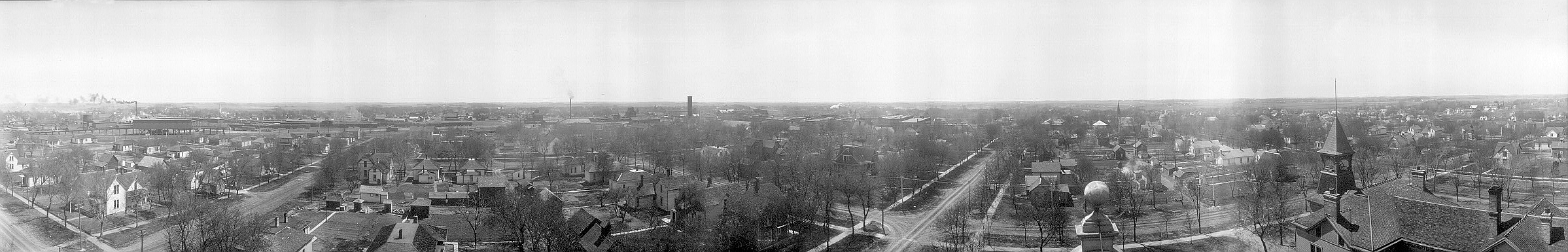
Panorama image of Eagle Grove, 1912
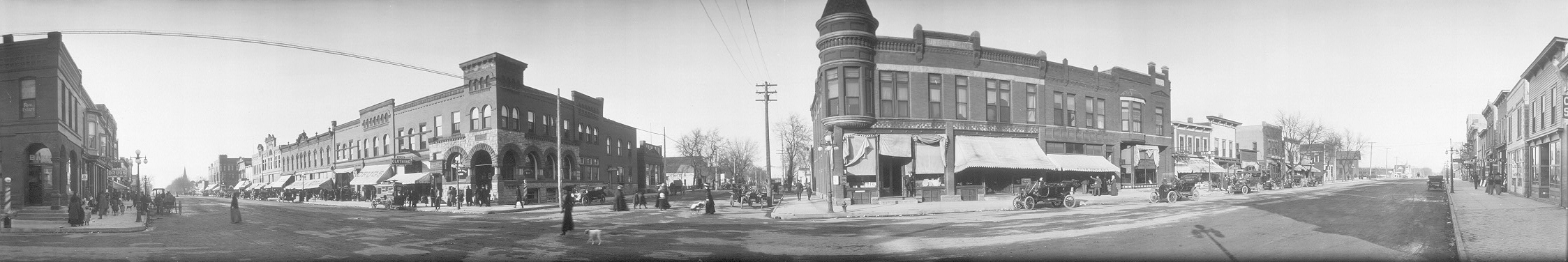
Broadway in Eagle Grove, 1912

== Notable people ==
- Robert D. Blue (1898–1989) 30th governor of Iowa from 1945 to 1949
- Frances Lee, a silent film actress
- Alvin Setzepfandt, veterinarian and Minnesota politician
