= Marsh Rainbow Arch Bridge (Chippewa Falls, Wisconsin) =

- Spring Street Bridge
- U.S. National Register of Historic Places
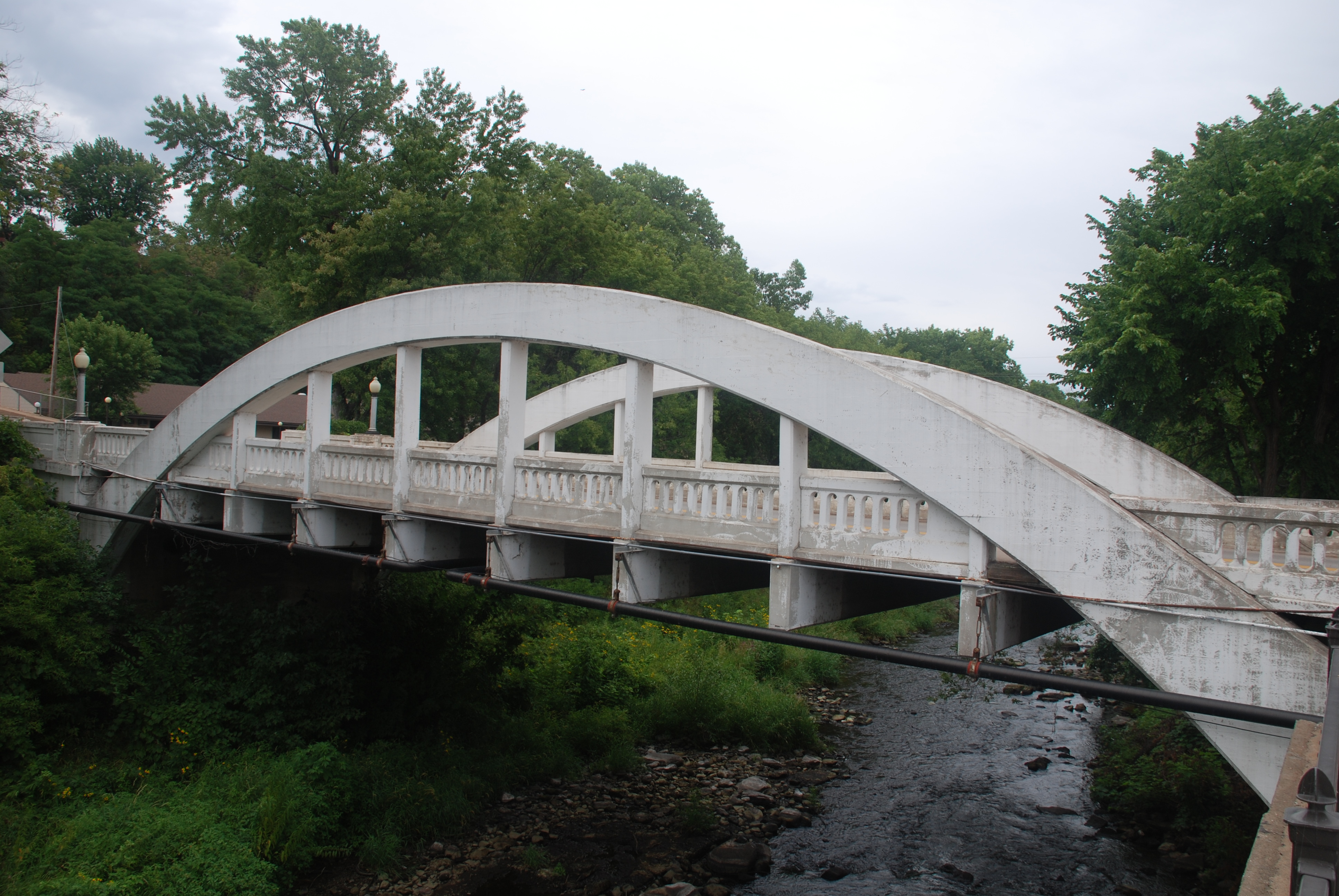

- Location within Wisconsin Location within the United States
- Location: Spring Street, Chippewa Falls, Wisconsin
- Coordinates: 44°56′11″N 91°23′26″W
- Area: less than one acre
- Built: 1916
- Built by: Iowa Bridge Company
- Engineer: James Barney Marsh
- NRHP reference No.: 82000642
- Added to NRHP: June 25, 1982

The Marsh Rainbow Arch Bridge is a historic bridge over Duncan Creek located in Chippewa Falls, Wisconsin. It was added to the National Register of Historic Places in 1982.

== History ==
Built in 1916, the bridge was designed by James Barney Marsh of North Lake, Wisconsin, and constructed by the Iowa Bridge Company at a cost of $13,950. It replaced another concrete bridge built in 1915, which was immediately wrecked by the spring flood of 1916. The use of reinforced concrete in bridges had been pioneered in Germany and Hungary and was controversial in Chippewa then. It was the only bridge over Duncan Creek to survive the flood of 1934, and after 100 years, it is still in good condition.

== See also ==
- List of bridges documented by the Historic American Engineering Record in Wisconsin
