= Garretson Outlet Bridge =

- U.S. National Register of Historic Places
- Location within Iowa Location within the United States
- Location: County Road K64 over Garretson Outlet Ditch
- Nearest city: Whiting, Iowa
- Coordinates: 42°12′47″N 96°06′42″W
- Built: 1913
- Architect: Iowa Bridge Company
- Architectural style: Warren pony truss
- MPS: Highway Bridges of Iowa MPS
- NRHP reference No.: 99000313
- Added to NRHP: March 12, 1999

The Garretson Outlet Bridge is a historic structure located north of Whiting, Iowa, United States. It carries 100th Street, a gravel road, over Garretson Outlet Ditch for 168 feet (51 m). The Iowa Bridge Company of Des Moines held the bridge contract for Monona County when this bridge was built. They fabricated and erected the Warren pony truss with polygonal upper chords in 1913. Around the same time they had constructed other several small- and medium-scale bridges over a system of channelized streams and drainage ditches that had recently been completed across the county. This bridge was listed on the National Register of Historic Places in 1999.
