= Goldfield Bridge =

- Formerly listed on the U.S. National Register of Historic Places
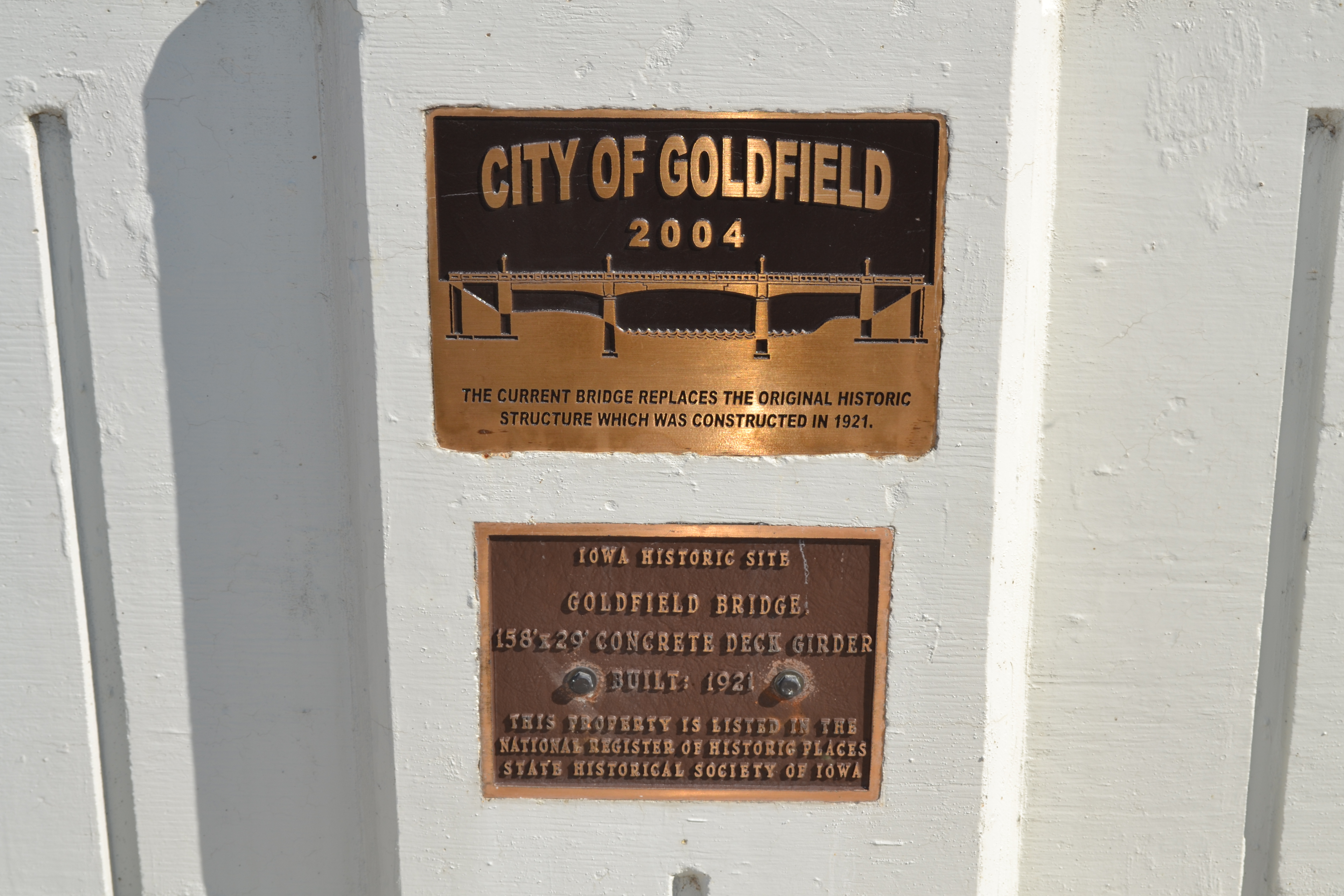
- Plaques on the new bridge

- Location within Iowa Location within the United States
- Location: Oak St. over the Boone River; Goldfield, Iowa
- Coordinates: 42°44′14″N 93°55′29″W
- Area: less than one acre
- Built: 1921
- Built by: Iowa Bridge Company
- Architectural style: Concrete deck girder
- MPS: Highway Bridges of Iowa MPS
- NRHP reference No.: 98000456

Significant dates
- Added to NRHP: May 15, 1998
- Removed from NRHP: September 19, 2019

The Goldfield Bridge was a historic structure located in Goldfield, Iowa, United States. It was a 158-foot (48 m) Concrete deck girder span over the Boone River. The bridge was built in 1921 for $40,584 by the Iowa Bridge Company. It was the most expensive structure built in Wright County up to that time. This bridge replaced an earlier pinned through truss span built by Des Moines bridge builder N.M. Stark. It was listed on the National Register of Historic Places (NRHP) in 1998. The present bridge replaced the historic structure in 2004. The historic bridge was removed from the NRHP in 2019.
