= Rockwell City Bridge =

- U.S. National Register of Historic Places
- Location within Iowa Location within the United States
- Location: 270th St. over an unnamed stream
- Nearest city: Rockwell City, Iowa
- Coordinates: 42°23′57″N 94°36′25″W
- Area: less than one acre
- Built: 1915
- Built by: Iowa Bridge Company
- Architect: James B. Marsh
- Architectural style: Marsh arch
- MPS: Highway Bridges of Iowa MPS
- NRHP reference No.: 98000752
- Added to NRHP: June 25, 1998

The Rockwell City Bridge is located just east of Rockwell City, Iowa, United States. The 60-foot (18 m) span carried traffic on 270th Street over an unnamed stream. In 1915 Calhoun County requested the Iowa State Highway Commission (ISHC) and Des Moines engineer James B. Marsh to design a bridge for this crossing. The ISHC designed a double span concrete girder structure, while Marsh submitted his patented single-span rainbow arch configuration. They chose the Marsh submission, and contracted with the Iowa Bridge Company to build six bridges for $11,690, which included the costs for this bridge at $4,107.65. Originally built to serve a county road, it was later incorporated into the route for U.S. Highway 20 and carried heavy traffic until the highway was realigned in 1981. While no longer in use, the bridge remains in place just south of the replacement span. It was listed on the National Register of Historic Places in 1998.

In 2020, the bridge and some adjacent land was turned into a roadside park managed by Calhoun County Conservation.
