= St. Scholastica Catholic Church and Rectory =

Historic church in South Dakota, United States

- St. Scholastica Catholic Church; St. Scholastica Rectory
- U.S. National Register of Historic Places
- Location within South Dakota Location within the United States
- Location: W side of Fourth St., between Wisconsin and State Sts., Letcher, South Dakota
- Coordinates: 43°53′47″N 98°08′08″W (church); 43°53′47″N 98°08′07″W (rectory)
- Area: 1.3 acres (0.53 ha)
- Built: 1900 (church); 1906 (rectory)
- Architectural style: Late Gothic Revival, Vernacular Gothic Revival, Other (church); American Foursquare (rectory)
- NRHP reference No.: 94000567, 94000568
- Added to NRHP: June 2, 1994

St. Scholastica Catholic Church is a historic church building on the west side of Fourth St., between Wisconsin and State Streets in Letcher, South Dakota. The St. Scholastica Rectory is its rectory. The two buildings were separately listed on the National Register of Historic Places in 1994.

Although the first Catholic services were held as early as 1888, at the Letcher School, the small community was not able to muster the resources to build a church until 1900. This structure, of balloon frame and clapboard construction, is "a vernacular example of late Gothic Revival architecture." It was damaged by a tornado in 1924, but repaired and returned to use.

St. Scholastica was canonically recognized as a parish from 1913 to 1979; although the cemetery remains active, it is no longer a community of the Diocese of Sioux Falls. The property was converted to a residence.

The church is cruciform in plan. It has balloon frame construction on a high poured concrete foundation, and is covered by clapboards.

The rectory is a two-story house which was deemed notable as "a well preserved example of the American Foursquare style which incorporates elements of the earlier Colonial Revival and Queen Anne traditions."
