= North Skunk River Bridge =

- U.S. National Register of Historic Places
- Location within Iowa Location within the United States
- Location: County Road G13 over the North Skunk River
- Nearest city: New Sharon, Iowa
- Coordinates: 41°29′41″N 92°38′0″W
- Area: less than one acre
- Built: 1920
- Built by: Iowa Bridge Company
- Architect: Iowa State Highway Commission
- Architectural style: Truss bridge
- MPS: Highway Bridges of Iowa MPS
- NRHP reference No.: 98000503
- Added to NRHP: May 15, 1998

North Skunk River Bridge is located northeast of New Sharon, Iowa, United States. It carries traffic on County Road G13 over the North Skunk River for 202 feet (62 m). The Mahaska and the Poweshiek County Boards of Supervisors met in New Sharon in February 1919 to discuss building a new bridge to be built along the county line. The two counties split $40,000 in costs, with the citizens of New Sharon and vicinity paying the remaining $10,000. The truss bridge was designed by the Iowa State Highway Commission, and constructed by the Iowa Bridge Company. It was completed in 1920, and was moved to its present location sometime later. Even though it is no longer in its historic location, the bridge was listed on the National Register of Historic Places in 1998 as the longest pinned connected truss bridge in Iowa.
