= Fillmore Block =

- U.S. National Register of Historic Places
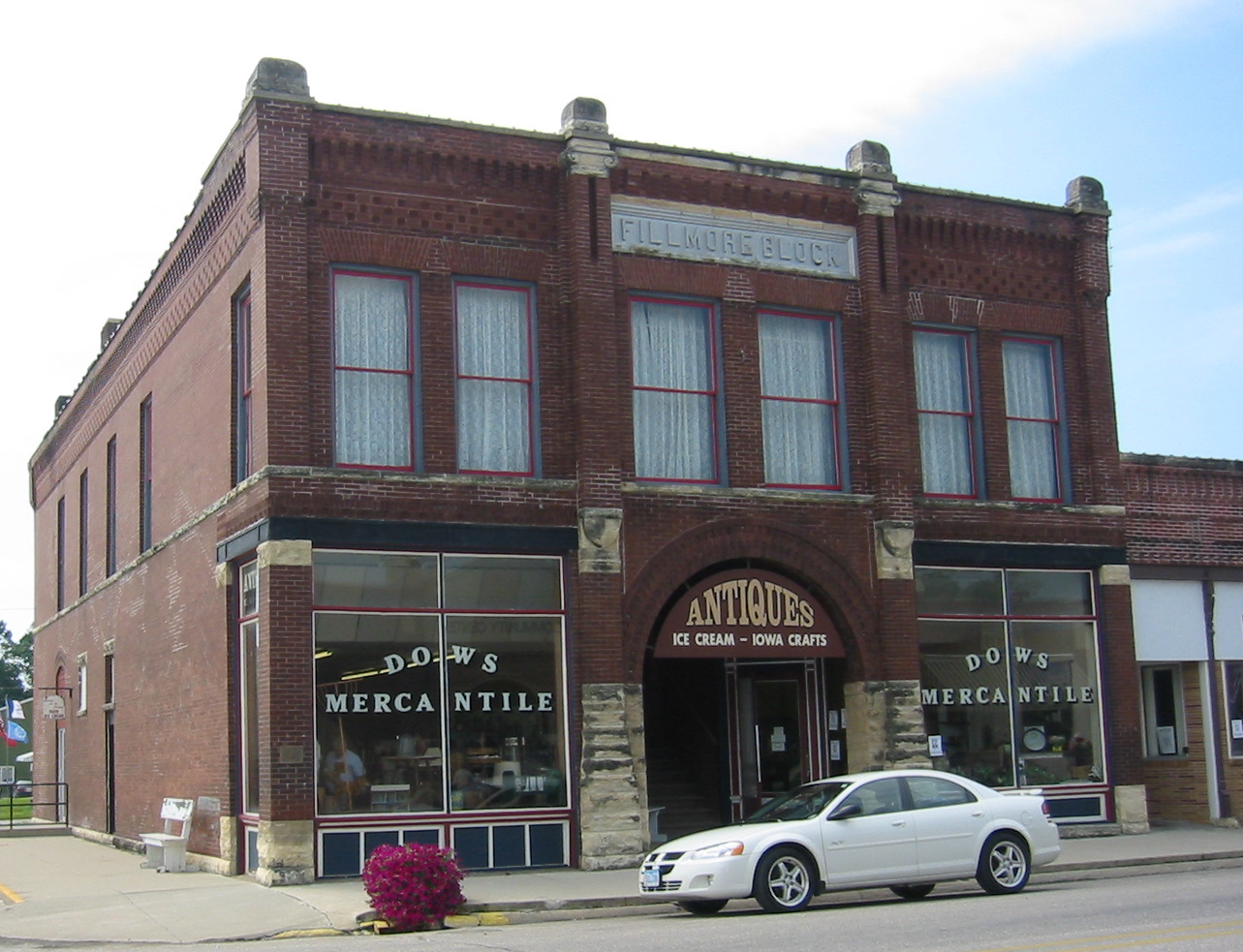

- Location within Iowa Location within the United States
- Location: Junction of Ellsworth and Garfield, Dows, Iowa
- Coordinates: 42°39′23″N 93°29′59″W
- Area: less than one acre
- Built: 1894-1895
- Architect: A.H. Conner & Co.
- Architectural style: Romanesque Revival
- NRHP reference No.: 98001323
- Added to NRHP: November 20, 1998

The Fillmore Block, now known as the Dows Mercantile Store, is a historic building located in Dows, Iowa, United States. The Dows commercial district was destroyed in a fire in 1894. This building was completed for $12,000 in 1895 for D.H. Fillmore, a member of a prominent family in the community. The two-story Victorian Romanesque Revival style structure was designed by A.H. Conner & Co. It was one of 17 stores constructed in the commercial area. The building housed a variety commercial enterprises including a restaurant, ladies clothing and dress goods, boots and shoes, notions, groceries, flour, hardware, furniture and the like. It was acquired by the Dows Historical Society in 1987. It was reopened two years later as an antique mall that also sells Iowa-made products. The building was listed on the National Register of Historic Places in 1998.
