= Woonsocket State Bank =

- U.S. National Register of Historic Places
- Location within South Dakota Location within the United States
- Location: 201 S. Dumont Ave., Woonsocket, South Dakota
- Coordinates: 44°03′10″N 98°16′34″W
- Area: less than one acre
- Built: 1906
- Architectural style: Early Commercial
- NRHP reference No.: 02000024
- Added to NRHP: February 14, 2002

Woonsocket State Bank, located at 201 S. Dumont Ave. in Woonsocket, South Dakota, was built in 1906. It was listed on the National Register of Historic Places in 2002.

It is Early Commercial in style. It has also been known as Sanborn County Bank.

It was deemed notable "for the distinctive architectural style of Commercial. The Bank, constructed in 1906 is a well-preserved example of the Commercial style in a rural town setting." It was also noted that it "is the only remaining building in the main commercial area with any historical integrity."
