= Burlington, Cedar Rapids & Northern Passenger Depot-Dows =

Historic railway station in Dows, Iowa, USA

Dows
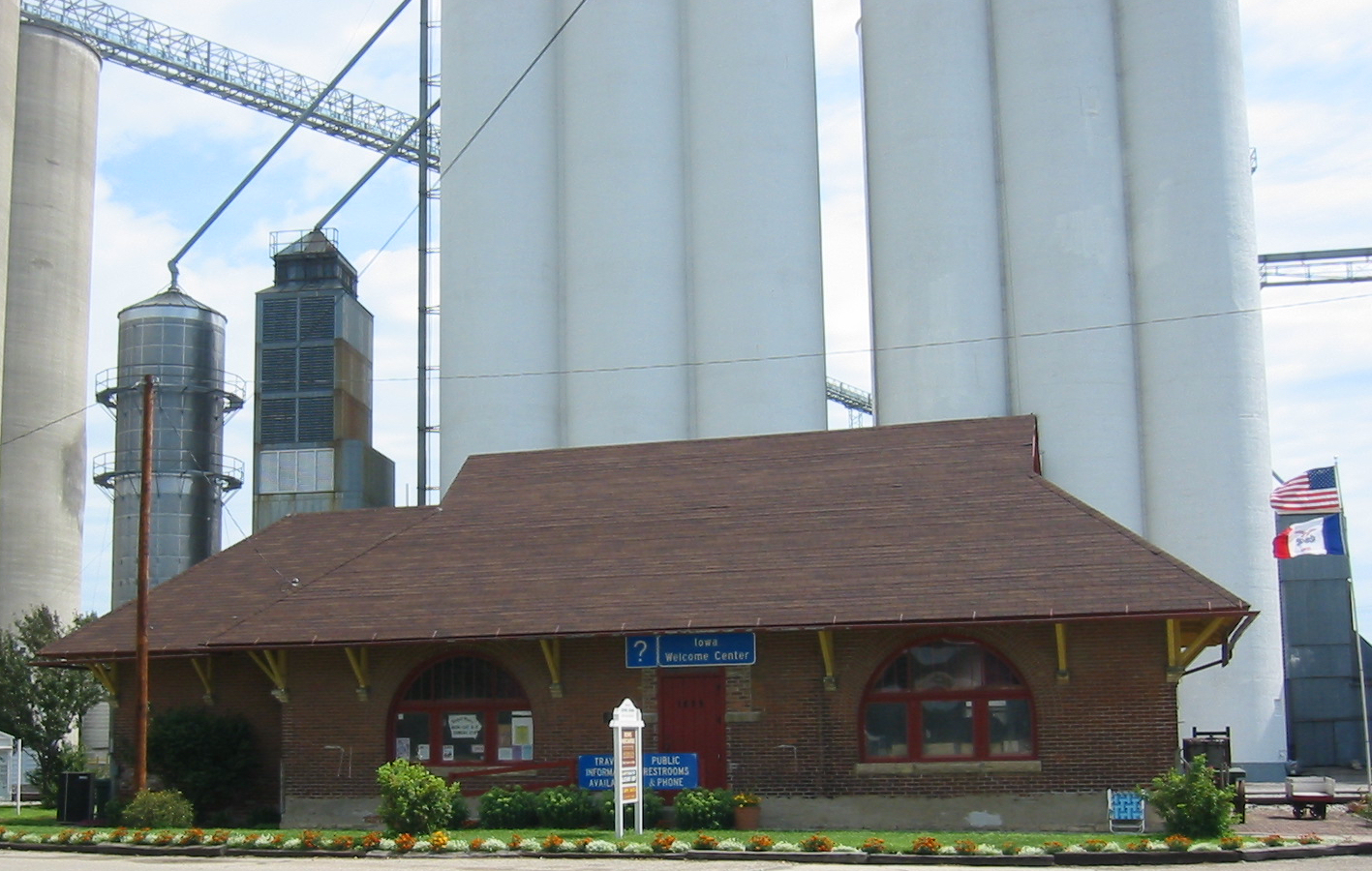
- The station in August 2007.

General information
- Location: 200 Railroad Street, Dows, Iowa 50071
- System: Former Rock Island Line passenger station
- Platforms: 1

History
- Opened: 1896

Services
Preceding station	Chicago, Rock Island and Pacific Railroad	Following station
Galt toward Watertown	Watertown – Cedar Rapids	Popejoy toward Cedar Rapids
Rowan toward Estherville	Estherville – Iowa Falls	Popejoy toward Iowa Falls
- Burlington, Cedar Rapids & Northern Passenger Depot-Dows
- U.S. National Register of Historic Places
- Location within Iowa Location within the United States
- Location: 200 Railroad St. Dows, Iowa
- Coordinates: 42°39′28″N 93°29′59″W
- Area: less than one acre
- Built: 1896
- Architectural style: Romanesque Revival
- MPS: Advent & Development of Railroads in Iowa MPS
- NRHP reference No.: 92001744
- Added to NRHP: January 7, 1993
Location

Burlington, Cedar Rapids & Northern Passenger Depot-Dows, also known as the Dows Rock Island Depot, is an historic building located in Dows, Iowa, United States. The depot was built in 1896 and served the Burlington, Cedar Rapids and Northern Railway as a combination passenger and freight station. The Romanesque Revival style was inspired by Henry Hobson Richardson's designs for small railroad stations. It was the first railway depot in Wright County. It passed to the Chicago, Rock Island and Pacific Railroad and continued to serve as a working depot until 1980. The Dows Historical Society bought and restored the depot in 1988. It now serves as a welcome center and railroad museum. It was listed on the National Register of Historic Places in 1993.
