= South Dakota Dept. of Transportation Bridge No. 56-090-096 =

- U.S. National Register of Historic Places
- Nearest city: Forestburg, South Dakota
- Coordinates: 44°03′40″N 98°09′03″W
- Area: less than one acre
- Built: 1912
- Built by: Iowa Bridge Company
- Architectural style: Warren Pony Truss
- MPS: Historic Bridges in South Dakota MPS
- NRHP reference No.: 93001310
- Added to NRHP: December 9, 1993

South Dakota Dept. of Transportation Bridge No. 56-090-096, near Forestburg in Sanborn County, South Dakota, is a Warren pony truss bridge built by the Iowa Bridge Company in 1912. It was listed on the National Register of Historic Places in 1993.

It brought a local road across Sand Creek. It was a single-span, 64 feet (20 m), steel bridge with a mix of bolted and riveted connections, resting on concrete abutments with wing walls. It was located about six miles east of Woonsocket.

The bridge was replaced between 2006 and 2008
