= Boone Bridge (Boone, Iowa) =

- Formerly listed on the U.S. National Register of Historic Places
- Location within Iowa Location within the United States
- Location: Old US 30 over the Des Moines River
- Nearest city: Boone, Iowa
- Coordinates: 42°02′32″N 93°56′0″W
- Area: less than one acre
- Built: 1927-1928
- Built by: A. Olson Construction Company
- Architect: Iowa State Highway Commission
- Architectural style: Pratt/Parker through truss
- MPS: Highway Bridges of Iowa MPS
- NRHP reference No.: 98000761

Significant dates
- Added to NRHP: June 25, 1998
- Removed from NRHP: December 19, 2014

The Boone Bridge was located southwest of Boone, Iowa, United States. It spanned the Des Moines River for 647 feet (197 m). The area in which this bridge was built was a pivotal transportation corridor in the early 20th century. The Chicago and North Western Railroad built the Boone Viaduct upstream from this location in 1901. It was the world's longest two-track viaduct. The county built a pin-connected truss bridge to carry a county road over the river just downstream from this location in 1909. In 1913 it was chosen as part of the route of the Lincoln Highway, the nation's first transcontinental highway. Because of its narrow width of only 16 feet (4.9 m) and an increase in traffic, a new bridge was required. The Iowa State Highway Commission designed this bridge in 1927. It was composed of two riveted Pratt and two Parker through trusses. The contract to build the structure was awarded in November 1927 to the A. Olson Construction Company of Waterloo, Iowa for $77,900. It was completed later in 1928. The bridge carried U.S. Route 30 traffic until it was rerouted to the south. It carried a county road until it was replaced in the early 21st century, and dismantled. The bridge was listed on the National Register of Historic Places in 1998.
