= Boone Bridge 2 =

- U.S. National Register of Historic Places
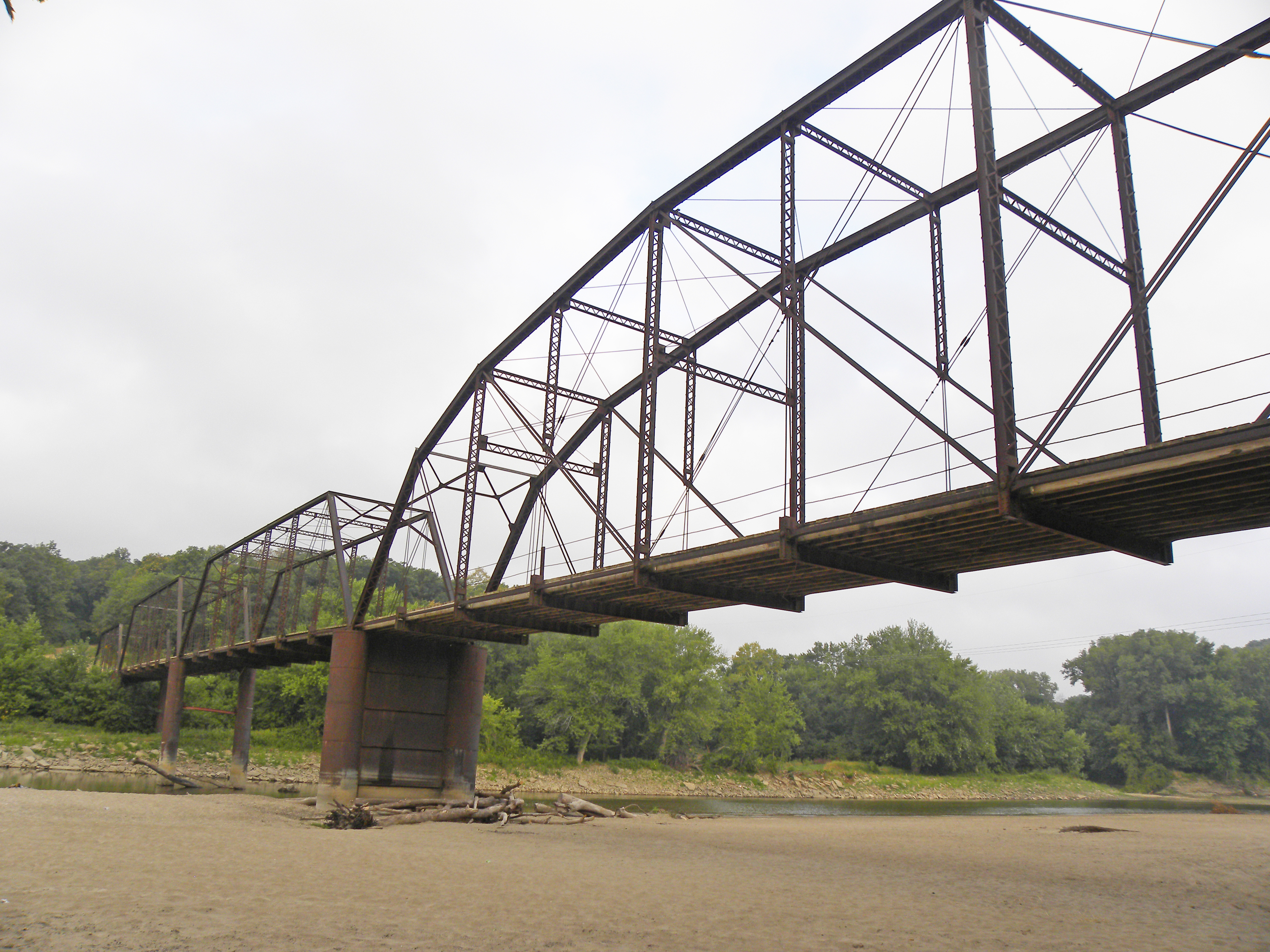

- Location within Iowa Location within the United States
- Location: 1000 200th Street over the Des Moines River
- Nearest city: Boone, Iowa
- Coordinates: 42°03′46″N 93°58′10″W
- Area: less than one acre
- Built: 1910
- Built by: Iowa Bridge Company
- Architectural style: Pennsylvania truss Pratt truss
- Demolished: 2016
- MPS: Highway Bridges of Iowa MPS
- NRHP reference No.: 98000765
- Added to NRHP: June 25, 1998

Boone Bridge 2, also known as the Wagon Wheel Bridge, was a historic structure that was located west of Boone, Iowa, United States. It spanned the Des Moines River for 703 feet (214 m). The Boone Commercial Association and the Boone County Board of Supervisors disagreed over the location of a new wagon bridge over the river. The county wanted the new bridge west from Eighth Street in Boone, closer to the Chicago and North Western Railroad's Boone Viaduct. The businessmen wanted to rebuild the Incline Bridge. The dispute was resolved when the Commercial association offered to buy the Incline Bridge. The county contracted with the Iowa Bridge Company to design and build the bridge, which was completed in 1910 for $77,900. The bridge consisted of a long-span Pennsylvania truss over the main channel of the river and three Pratt trusses over the floodplain. It was listed on the National Register of Historic Places in 1998.

In March 2016, a span of the bridge collapsed into the Des Moines River after ice from a broken ice jam damaged one of the piers. The bridge was demolished in June 2016.

== See also ==
- List of bridges documented by the Historic American Engineering Record in Iowa
