= Rockwell City, Iowa =

- City
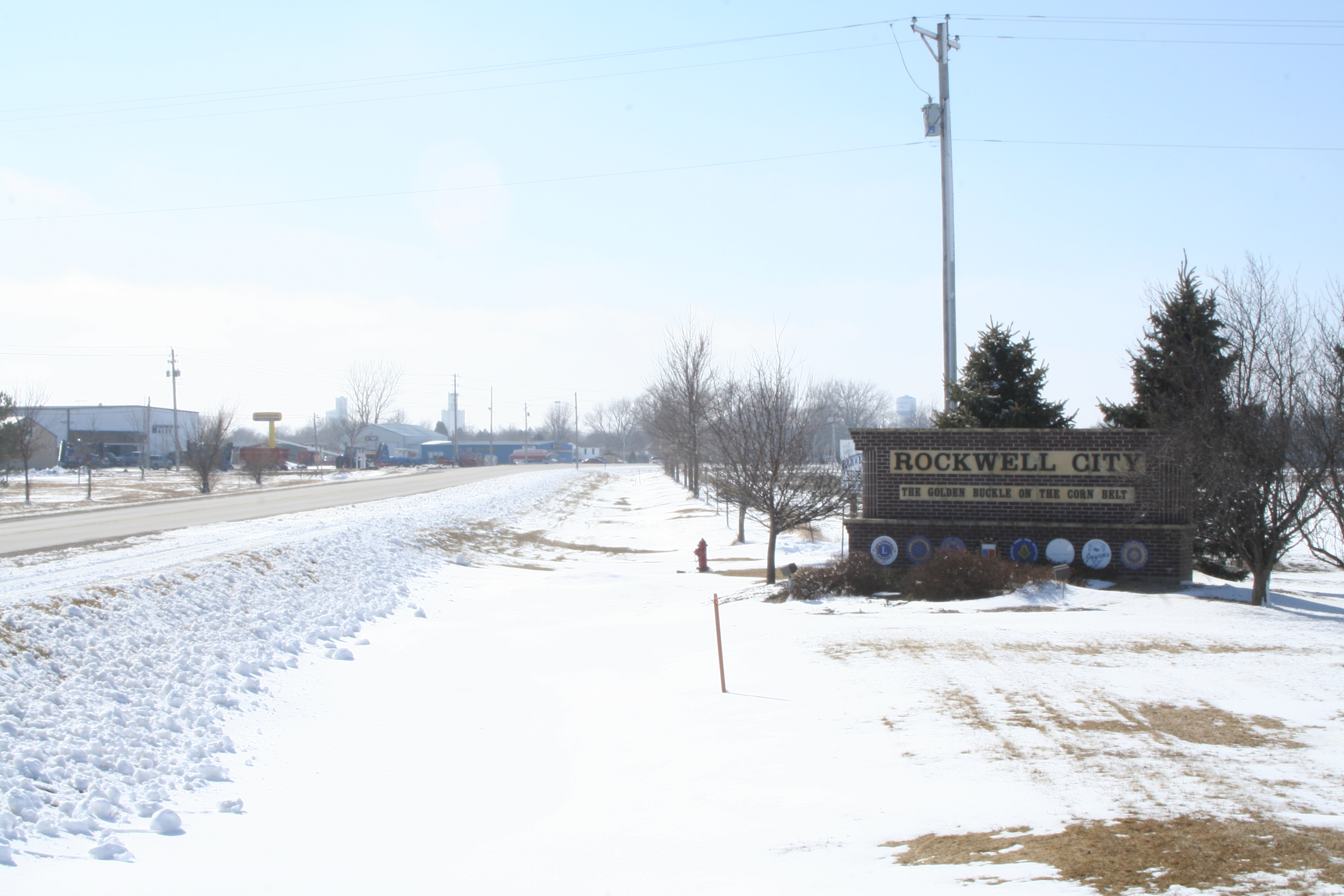
- Eastern entrance to Rockwell City on old US20
- Motto: The Golden Buckle on the Corn Belt
- Location of Rockwell City, Iowa
- Coordinates: 42°23′45″N 94°37′59″W
- Country: United States
- State: Iowa
- County: Calhoun
- Townships: Twin Lakes Township / Center Township

Area
  - Total: 4.21 sq mi (10.91 km^{2})
  - Land: 4.21 sq mi (10.91 km^{2})
  - Water: 0 sq mi (0.00 km^{2})
- Elevation: 1,214 ft (370 m)

Population (2020)
  - Total: 2,240
  - Density: 531.7/sq mi (205.28/km^{2})
- Time zone: UTC-6 (Central (CST))
  - Summer (DST): UTC-5 (CDT)
- ZIP code: 50579
- Area code: 712
- FIPS code: 19-68295
- GNIS feature ID: 2396412
- Website: www.rockwellcity.com

Rockwell City is a city and the county seat of Calhoun County, Iowa, United States. The population was 2,240 in 2020.

== History ==
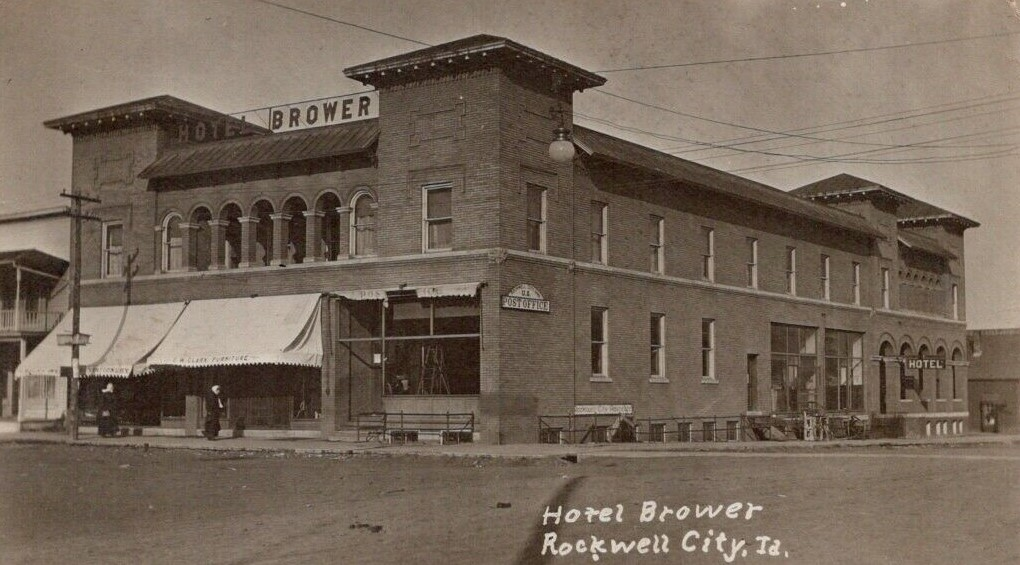
Rockwell City, 1912

Rockwell City was platted in 1876. It is named for its founders, John M. Rockwell, and his wife Charlotte M. Rockwell.

== Demographics ==
Rockwell City historical population
Year	Pop.	±%
1880	90	—
1890	516	+473.3%
1900	1,222	+136.8%
1910	1,528	+25.0%
1920	2,039	+33.4%
1930	2,108	+3.4%
1940	2,391	+13.4%
1950	2,333	−2.4%
1960	2,313	−0.9%
1970	2,396	+3.6%
1980	2,276	−5.0%
1990	1,981	−13.0%
2000	2,264	+14.3%
2010	1,709	−24.5%
2020	2,240	+31.1%
Source: "U.S. Census website". United States Census Bureau. Source: U.S. Decennial Census

=== 2020 census ===
As of the 2020 census, Rockwell City had a population of 2,240. The median age was 40.3 years. 17.9% of residents were under the age of 18 and 17.7% of residents were 65 years of age or older. For every 100 females there were 147.8 males, and for every 100 females age 18 and over there were 157.3 males age 18 and over.

0.0% of residents lived in urban areas, while 100.0% lived in rural areas.

There were 753 households in Rockwell City, of which 25.8% had children under the age of 18 living in them. Of all households, 44.9% were married-couple households, 18.1% were households with a male householder and no spouse or partner present, and 29.6% were households with a female householder and no spouse or partner present. About 36.5% of all households were made up of individuals and 18.8% had someone living alone who was 65 years of age or older.

There were 872 housing units, of which 13.6% were vacant. The homeowner vacancy rate was 1.9% and the rental vacancy rate was 17.8%.

Racial composition as of the 2020 census
Race	Number	Percent
White	1,999	89.2%
Black or African American	121	5.4%
American Indian and Alaska Native	7	0.3%
Asian	7	0.3%
Native Hawaiian and Other Pacific Islander	1	0.0%
Some other race	37	1.7%
Two or more races	68	3.0%
Hispanic or Latino (of any race)	108	4.8%

=== 2010 census ===
As of the census of 2010, there were 1,709 people, 773 households, and 471 families residing in the city. The population density was 405.0 inhabitants per square mile (156.4/km^{2}). There were 916 housing units at an average density of 217.1 per square mile (83.8/km^{2}). The racial makeup of the city was 98.4% White, 0.2% African American, 0.1% Native American, 0.4% Asian, 0.1% from other races, and 0.8% from two or more races. Hispanic or Latino of any race were 0.4% of the population.

There were 773 households, of which 24.7% had children under the age of 18 living with them, 49.3% were married couples living together, 8.7% had a female householder with no husband present, 3.0% had a male householder with no wife present, and 39.1% were non-families. 36.2% of all households were made up of individuals, and 20% had someone living alone who was 65 years of age or older. The average household size was 2.14 and the average family size was 2.77.

The median age in the city was 47.6 years. 21.8% of residents were under the age of 18; 5.9% were between the ages of 18 and 24; 19.5% were from 25 to 44; 27.5% were from 45 to 64; and 25.4% were 65 years of age or older. The gender makeup of the city was 46.6% male and 53.4% female.

=== 2000 census ===
As of the census of 2000, there were 2,264 people, 818 households, and 503 families residing in the city. The population density was 537.5 inhabitants per square mile (207.5/km^{2}). There were 951 housing units at an average density of 225.8 per square mile (87.2/km^{2}). The racial makeup of the city was 93.99% White, 3.09% African American, 0.53% Native American, 0.31% Asian, 0.04% Pacific Islander, 0.80% from other races, and 1.24% from two or more races. Hispanic or Latino of any race were 1.68% of the population.

There were 818 households, out of which 25.3% had children under the age of 18 living with them, 52.0% were married couples living together, 7.5% had a female householder with no husband present, and 38.5% were non-families. 36.2% of all households were made up of individuals, and 23.6% had someone living alone who was 65 years of age or older. The average household size was 2.15 and the average family size was 2.79.

18.0% are under the age of 18, 6.4% from 18 to 24, 33.0% from 25 to 44, 21.0% from 45 to 64, and 21.6% who were 65 years of age or older. The median age was 41 years. For every 100 females, there were 125.0 males. For every 100 females age 18 and over, there were 132.9 males.

The median income for a household in the city was $31,071, and the median income for a family was $42,625. Males had a median income of $28,519 versus $22,929 for females. The per capita income for the city was $17,671. About 6.1% of families and 9.5% of the population were below the poverty line, including 9.0% of those under age 18 and 7.7% of those age 65 or over.

== Geography ==
According to the United States Census Bureau, the city has a total area of 4.21 square miles (10.90 km^{2}), all land.

=== Climate ===
Humid continental climate is a climatic region typified by large seasonal temperature differences, with warm to hot (and often humid) summers and cold (sometimes severely cold) winters. Precipitation is relatively well distributed year-round in many areas with this climate. The Köppen Climate Classification subtype for this climate is "Dfa" (Hot Summer Continental Climate).

Climate data for Rockwell City, Iowa, 1991–2020 normals, extremes 1894–present
Month	Jan	Feb	Mar	Apr	May	Jun	Jul	Aug	Sep	Oct	Nov	Dec	Year
Record high °F (°C)	70 (21)	70 (21)	87 (31)	97 (36)	106 (41)	105 (41)	109 (43)	110 (43)	102 (39)	94 (34)	80 (27)	70 (21)	110 (43)
Mean maximum °F (°C)	48.5 (9.2)	54.1 (12.3)	71.3 (21.8)	82.6 (28.1)	88.5 (31.4)	91.8 (33.2)	93.0 (33.9)	91.4 (33.0)	89.3 (31.8)	83.6 (28.7)	68.2 (20.1)	53.0 (11.7)	94.8 (34.9)
Mean daily maximum °F (°C)	26.5 (−3.1)	31.4 (−0.3)	45.1 (7.3)	59.2 (15.1)	70.0 (21.1)	79.6 (26.4)	82.9 (28.3)	80.7 (27.1)	75.0 (23.9)	62.2 (16.8)	45.8 (7.7)	32.0 (0.0)	57.5 (14.2)
Daily mean °F (°C)	17.4 (−8.1)	21.8 (−5.7)	34.7 (1.5)	47.4 (8.6)	59.4 (15.2)	69.6 (20.9)	72.9 (22.7)	70.6 (21.4)	63.0 (17.2)	50.3 (10.2)	35.6 (2.0)	23.4 (−4.8)	47.2 (8.4)
Mean daily minimum °F (°C)	8.4 (−13.1)	12.3 (−10.9)	24.4 (−4.2)	35.6 (2.0)	48.7 (9.3)	59.5 (15.3)	62.9 (17.2)	60.5 (15.8)	51.1 (10.6)	38.4 (3.6)	25.4 (−3.7)	14.8 (−9.6)	36.8 (2.7)
Mean minimum °F (°C)	−13.1 (−25.1)	−8.3 (−22.4)	2.8 (−16.2)	21.4 (−5.9)	35.0 (1.7)	47.4 (8.6)	52.5 (11.4)	50.7 (10.4)	36.7 (2.6)	23.3 (−4.8)	8.8 (−12.9)	−6.0 (−21.1)	−16.4 (−26.9)
Record low °F (°C)	−35 (−37)	−33 (−36)	−22 (−30)	4 (−16)	17 (−8)	34 (1)	42 (6)	36 (2)	20 (−7)	−3 (−19)	−16 (−27)	−32 (−36)	−35 (−37)
Average precipitation inches (mm)	0.76 (19)	0.99 (25)	1.99 (51)	3.76 (96)	5.02 (128)	5.04 (128)	3.54 (90)	4.53 (115)	2.95 (75)	2.35 (60)	1.48 (38)	1.34 (34)	33.75 (859)
Average snowfall inches (cm)	7.4 (19)	7.6 (19)	4.9 (12)	1.9 (4.8)	0.0 (0.0)	0.0 (0.0)	0.0 (0.0)	0.0 (0.0)	0.0 (0.0)	0.6 (1.5)	2.4 (6.1)	7.3 (19)	32.1 (81.4)
Average precipitation days (≥ 0.01 in)	5.3	5.2	7.0	9.4	12.4	10.9	8.8	8.8	7.8	8.1	5.0	5.4	94.1
Average snowy days (≥ 0.1 in)	3.9	3.4	2.3	0.8	0.0	0.0	0.0	0.0	0.0	0.2	1.3	3.6	15.5
Source 1: NOAA
Source 2: National Weather Service

== Education ==
Rockwell City is within the South Central Calhoun Community School District.

It was a part of the Rockwell City Community School District until July 1, 1993, when it merged into the Rockwell City–Lytton Community School District. That in turn merged into South Central Calhoun on July 1, 2014.

== Notable people ==
- Charles G. Boyd, 4-Star General of the United States Air Force was born in rural Rockwell City.
- Hubert Stanley Wall, mathematician, was born in Rockwell City.

=== Life Magazine feature ===
In 1958, Rockwell City resident Barry Wichmann was recognized for his IQ of 162 Wichmann's school lacked the resources to fully meet his needs, and his high intelligence led to frequent bouts of loneliness. He also suffered from dyscalculia, a learning disability similar to dyslexia. He eventually moved to Winchester, Virginia, where he finished high school and went on to obtain a PhD in clinical psychology from James Madison University.

== Arts and culture ==
=== Annual events ===
Since 2009, Rockwell City has hosted the annual "Sweet Corn Daze" festival, which typically takes place on the first weekend in August and includes a parade, various events, and vendors.

Rockwell City also hosts the annual Calhoun County Expo, Calhoun County's county fair. Rockwell City was selected as the location for the county fair in a county-wide election in 1980. Prior to that time, Calhoun County had two county fairs, one in Rockwell City and one in neighboring Manson. A 1979 state law, however, required counties to select a single county fair to be the "Official State Fair" which necessitated the vote and consolidation of county fairs in Calhoun County (among other Iowa counties).

=== Landmarks ===
Calhoun County Courthouse. The courthouse was constructed in 1914, with an architectural style of Neoclassical Revival and outer walls of limestone, with a red clay tile roof.

Calhoun County Historical Museum. Formerly the building of the Rockwell City High School, this building has been home to the Calhoun County Historical Museum since 1986. The museum traces its origins back to 1902 and seeks to preserve documents and artifacts related to the history and people of Calhoun County. As of January 2023, the museum is open on Sundays from 1-3pm from June to September or by appointment.

Rockwell City Bridge. One of two rainbow bridges in Calhoun County (the other being in Lake City), this bridge was built in 1915 and put into disuse with the realignment of U.S. Highway 20 in 1981. The bridge was added to the National Register of Historic Places in 1998. In 2020, the bridge and some adjacent land was turned into a local park.

== Pop culture ==
On the December 18, 2003, episode of Jeopardy!, the $500 answer in the category "U.S. City Nicknames" was "Rockwell City in this state calls itself the 'Golden buckle on the Corn Belt.' "

== See also ==
- List of cities in Iowa
