= Boone River Bridge =

- U.S. National Register of Historic Places
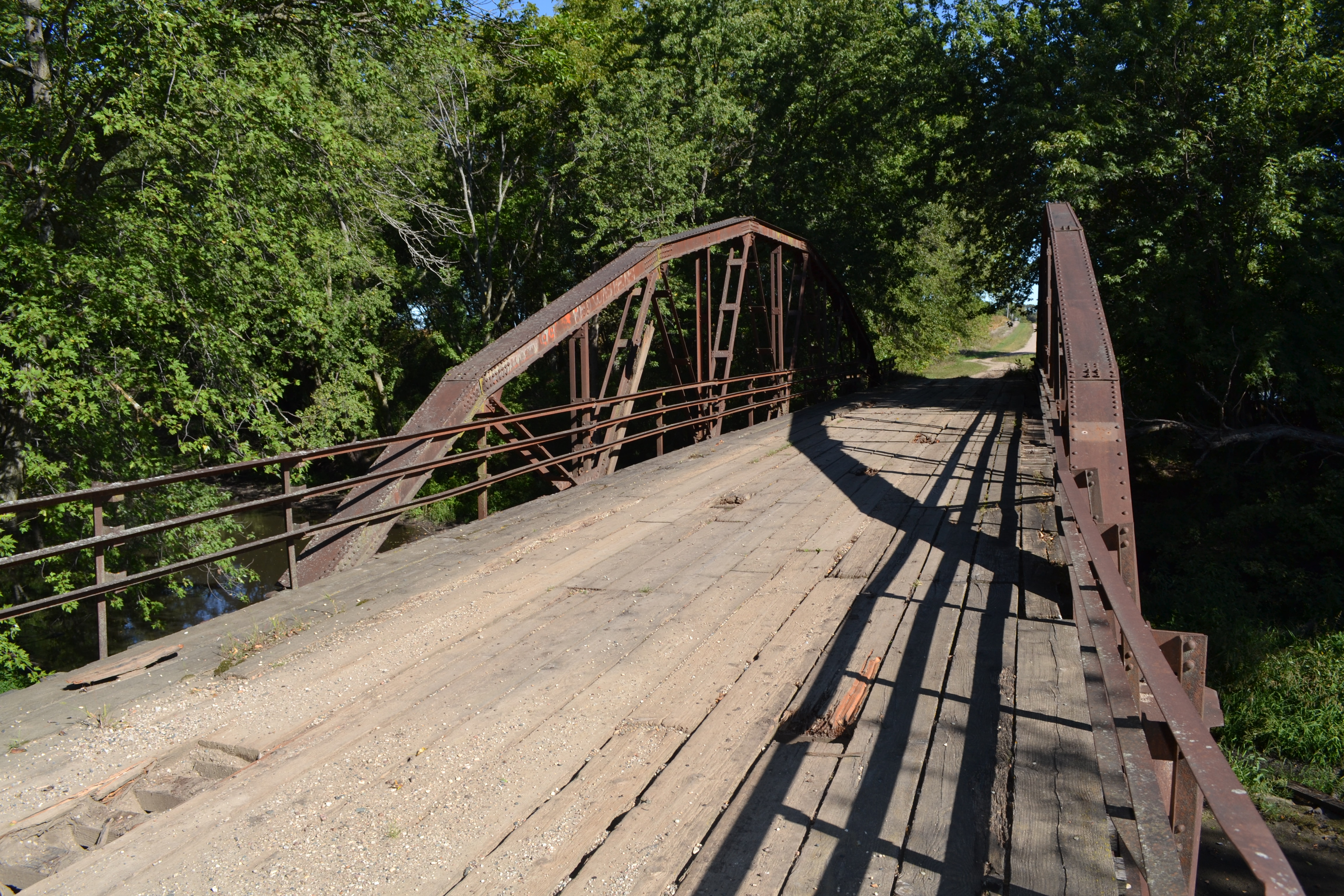

- Location within Iowa Location within the United States
- Location: Buchanan Ave. over the Boone River
- Nearest city: Goldfield, Iowa
- Coordinates: 42°51′26″N 93°56′46″W
- Area: less than one acre
- Built: 1912
- Built by: Iowa Bridge Company
- Architectural style: Warren Pony truss
- MPS: Highway Bridges of Iowa MPS
- NRHP reference No.: 98000457
- Added to NRHP: May 15, 1998

The Boone River Bridge is a historic structure located north of Goldfield, Iowa, United States. It is a 6-panel, 128-foot (39 m) Warren Pony truss span over the Boone River. The construction began in 1910. The bridge was built in 1912 by the Iowa Bridge Company using steel fabricated at the Cambria steel mills in Johnstown, Pennsylvania. The Boone River Bridge is one of the few remaining multiple span pin-connected Pratt trusses in the state. It was listed on the National Register of Historic Places in 1998.

The bridge was rehabilitated in 1940.
