= Quasdorf Blacksmith and Wagon Shop =

- U.S. National Register of Historic Places
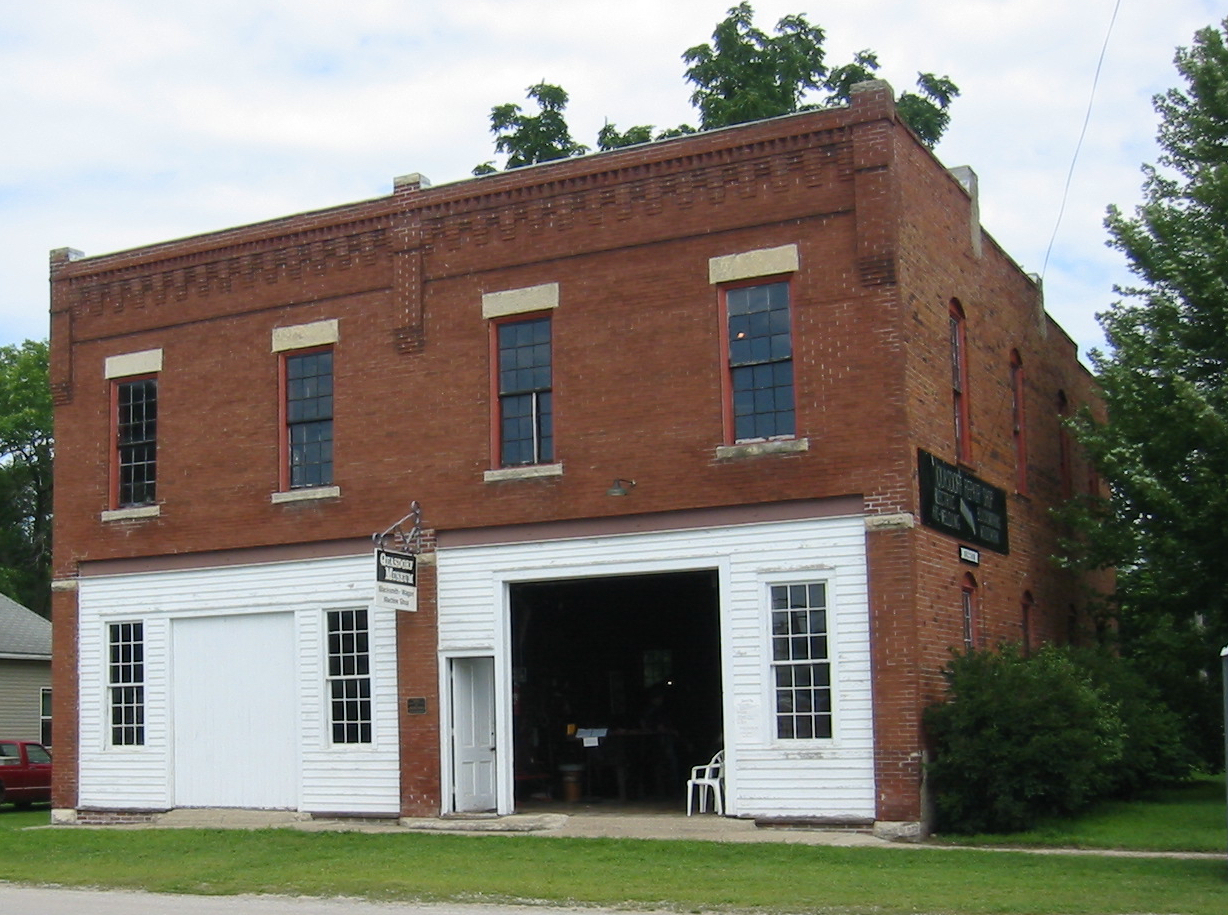

- Location within Iowa Location within the United States
- Location: Junction of Train and W. Railroad Sts., Dows, Iowa
- Coordinates: 42°39′25″N 93°29′57″W
- Built: 1899
- Architect: J.B. White
- Architectural style: Romanesque Revival
- NRHP reference No.: 93001545
- Added to NRHP: January 21, 1994

Quasdorf Blacksmith and Wagon Shop, now known as the Quasdorf Blacksmith and Wagon Museum, is a historic building located in Dows, Iowa, United States. The shop was built in 1899 and remained in continuous use until 1990 when Frank Quasdorf willed the building to the Dows Historical Society. The building was restored and reopened as a museum. Displays include machines, tools, belt-driven and electric welding equipment, original wagon wheels, blacksmithing items, a forge and the bellows. Many of the items on display are original to the building and the Quasdorf family.
