= Dows, Iowa =

- City
- Motto: A good town in a friendly community!
- Location of Dows, Iowa
- Coordinates: 42°39′33″N 93°29′56″W
- Country: US
- State: Iowa
- Counties: Wright, Franklin

Area
  - Total: 0.80 sq mi (2.06 km^{2})
  - Land: 0.77 sq mi (1.99 km^{2})
  - Water: 0.023 sq mi (0.06 km^{2})
- Elevation: 1,155 ft (352 m)

Population (2020)
  - Total: 521
  - Density: 677.4/sq mi (261.55/km^{2})
- Time zone: UTC-6 (Central (CST))
  - Summer (DST): UTC-5 (CDT)
- ZIP code: 50071
- Area code: 515
- FIPS code: 19-22305
- GNIS feature ID: 2394560

Dows is a city in Franklin and Wright counties of the U.S. state of Iowa. The population was 521 at the time of the 2020 census. The town was incorporated on May 3, 1892.

== History ==
Dows got its start in the year 1880, following construction of the railroad through that territory. Dows is named for a railroad contractor, Col. William Greene Dows.

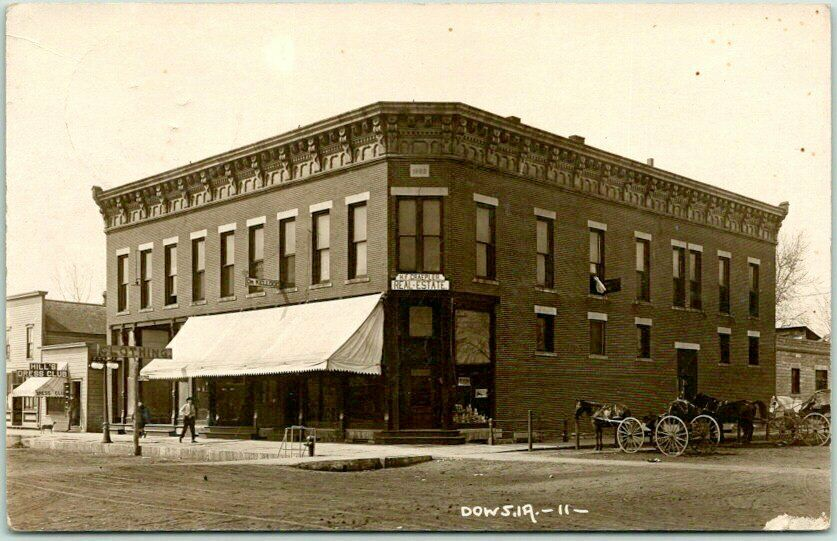
Dows, Iowa - 1917

=== Historical sites ===
The Dows Historical Society and community volunteers have restored several historical buildings, three of which are listed on the National Register of Historic Places. The Rock Island Depot in Dows was built in 1896. The historical society purchased and restored the depot in 1988 that houses an Iowa Welcome Center and historical railroad and community memorabilia. The Quasdorf Blacksmith and Wagon Museum was built in 1899 and was restored in 1990. This is one of the best equipped blacksmith shops in the Midwest. The Fillmore Building, a large cornerstone building on the south side of Main Street, was built in 1894 and has housed many businesses over the years. In 1987 the building was purchased by the historical society and restored. In 1989, the Dows Mercantile, an antique mall covering three floors, opened in the building.

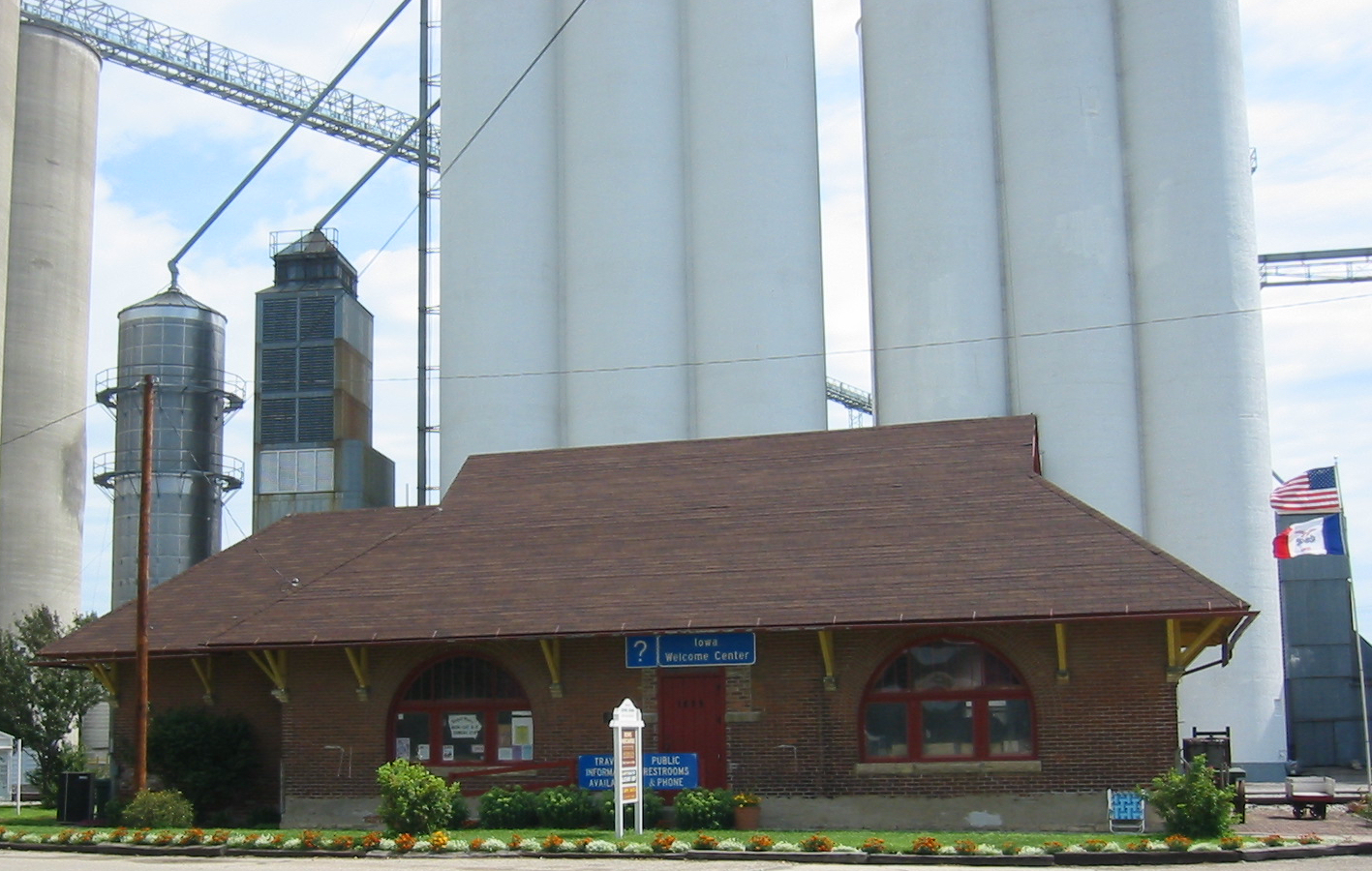
Burlington, Cedar Rapids & Northern Passenger Depot (later part of the Rock Island Railroad)

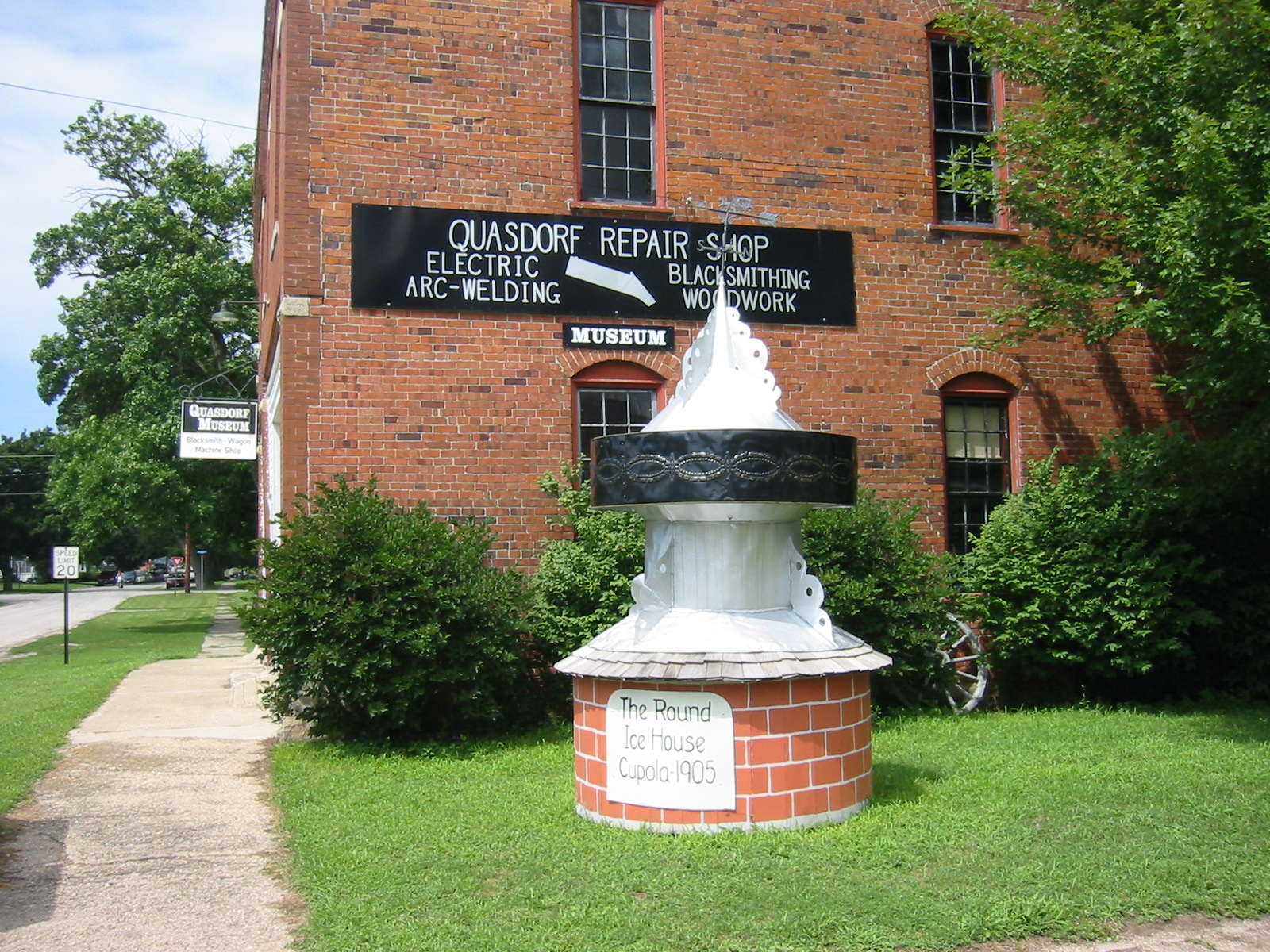
Quasdorf Blacksmith and Wagon Museum

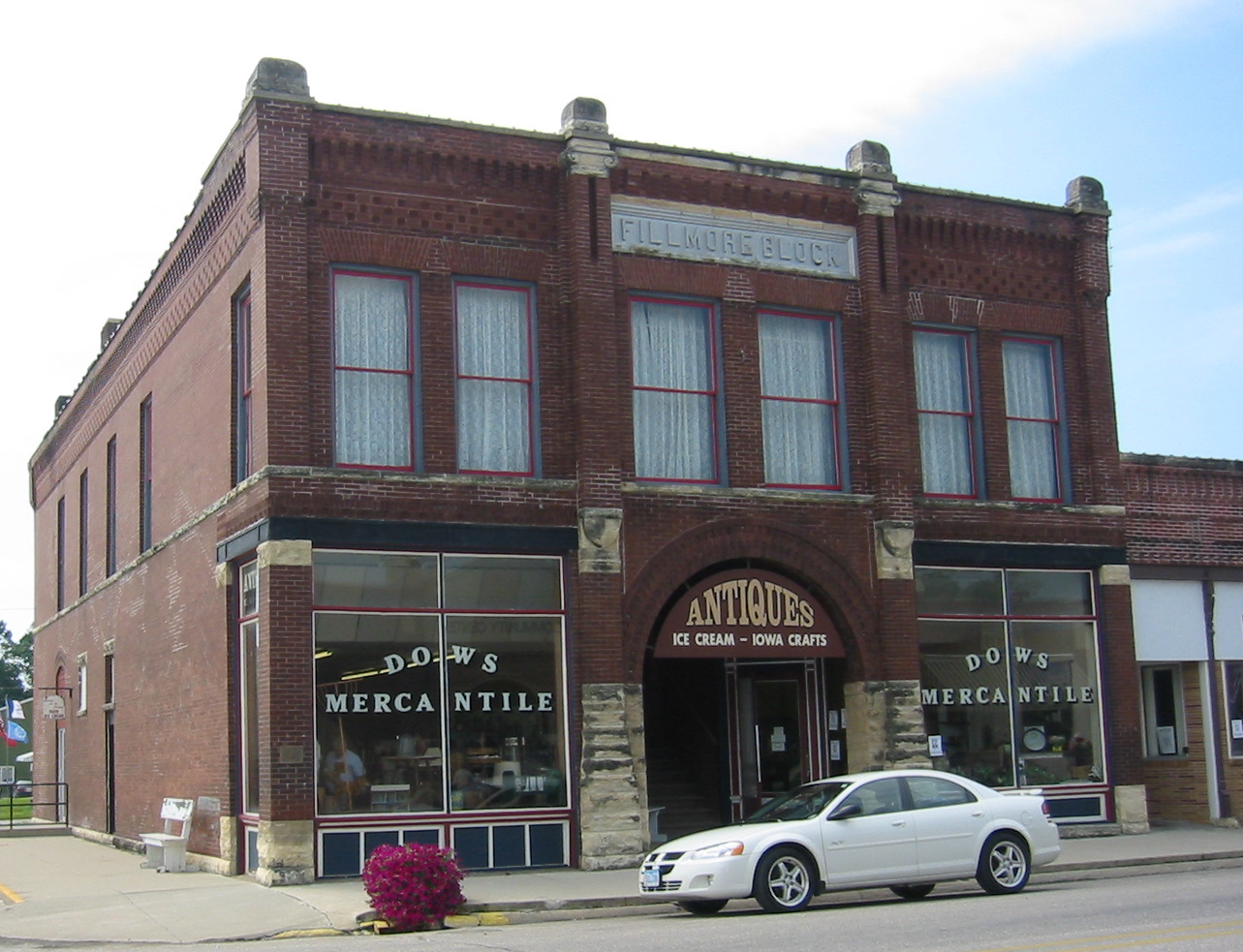
Fillmore Building

The Vernon Township Schoolhouse was built in 1887 and is a typical of what one-room, country schoolhouses were like in the 19th and early 20th centuries. The building was moved to town and was restored both inside and out. The schoolhouse is furnished with original desks, blackboards, and books. Another historical building located in the downtown area is the Evans Prairie Home, located across from the Welcome Center.

== Geography ==
Dows is located two miles (3.2 km) west of Interstate 35.

According to the United States Census Bureau, the city has a total area of 0.80 square miles (2.07 km^{2}), of which 0.77 square miles (1.99 km^{2}) is land and 0.03 square miles (0.08 km^{2}) is water.

== Demographics ==
Historical populations
Year	Pop.	±%
1900	818	—
1910	892	+9.0%
1920	1,145	+28.4%
1930	926	−19.1%
1940	945	+2.1%
1950	948	+0.3%
1960	882	−7.0%
1970	777	−11.9%
1980	771	−0.8%
1990	660	−14.4%
2000	675	+2.3%
2010	538	−20.3%
2020	521	−3.2%
Source:"U.S. Census website". United States Census Bureau. and Iowa Data Center; Source: U.S. Decennial Census

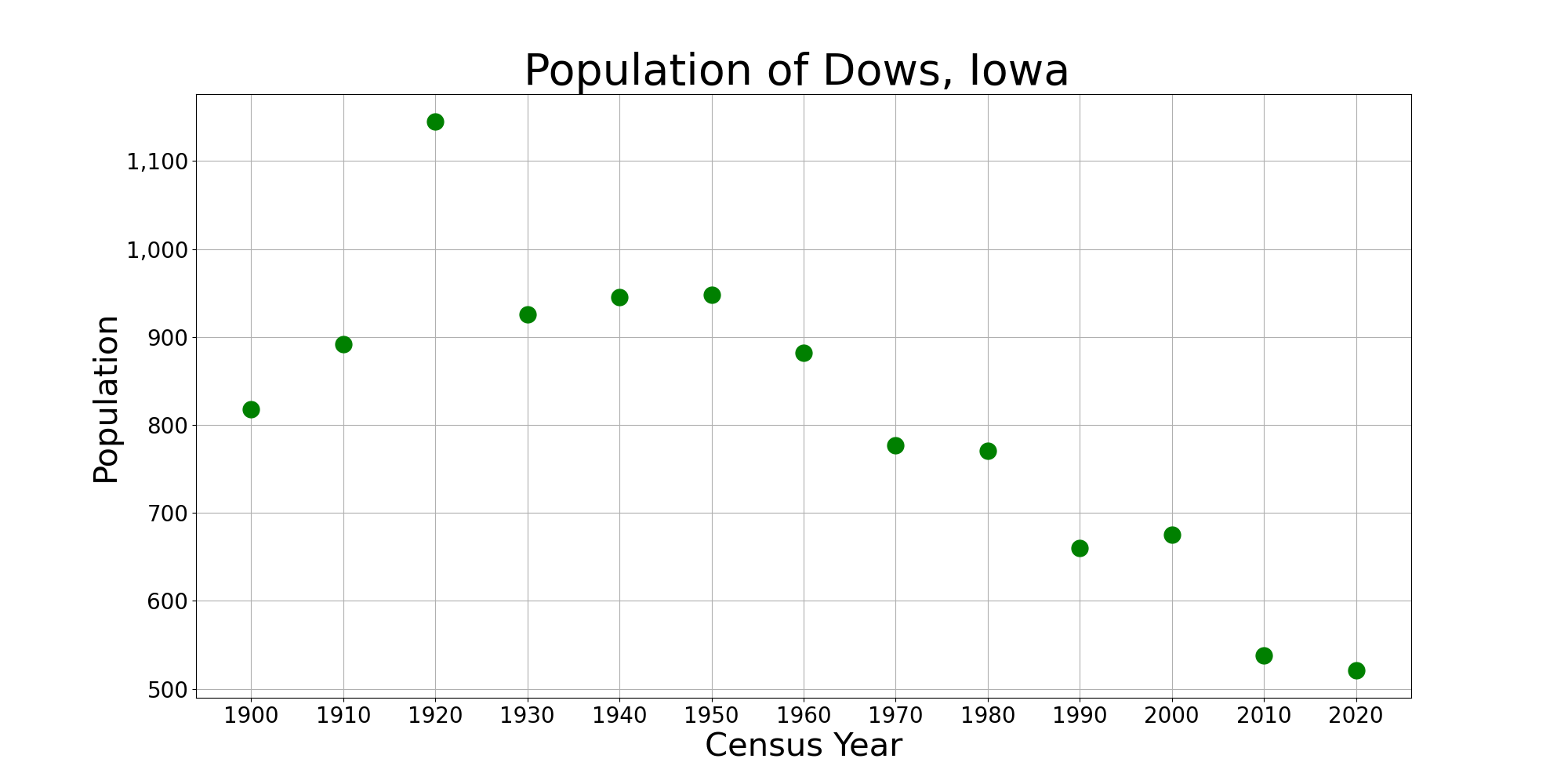
The population of Dows, Iowa from US census data

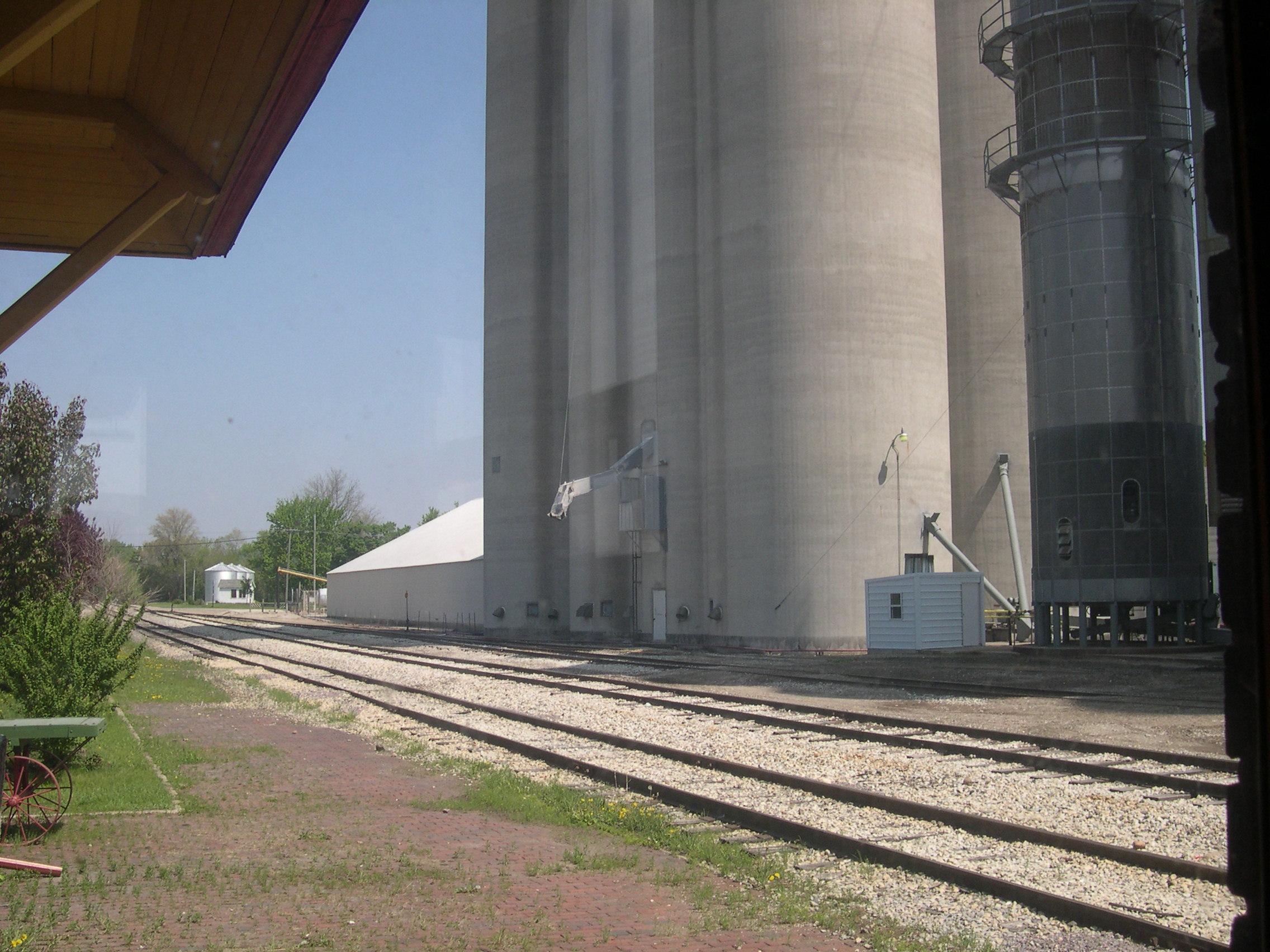
Outside of the Welcome Center at Dows, Iowa

=== 2020 census ===
As of the census of 2020, there were 521 people, 242 households, and 146 families residing in the city. The population density was 677.4 inhabitants per square mile (261.6/km^{2}). There were 284 housing units at an average density of 369.3 per square mile (142.6/km^{2}). The racial makeup of the city was 79.5% White, 0.0% Black or African American, 1.9% Native American, 0.4% Asian, 0.2% Pacific Islander, 11.3% from other races and 6.7% from two or more races. Hispanic or Latino persons of any race comprised 24.6% of the population.

Of the 242 households, 27.7% of which had children under the age of 18 living with them, 45.0% were married couples living together, 10.3% were cohabitating couples, 17.8% had a female householder with no spouse or partner present and 26.9% had a male householder with no spouse or partner present. 39.7% of all households were non-families. 32.2% of all households were made up of individuals, 11.6% had someone living alone who was 65 years old or older.

The median age in the city was 41.1 years. 23.4% of the residents were under the age of 20; 5.0% were between the ages of 20 and 24; 26.1% were from 25 and 44; 24.0% were from 45 and 64; and 21.5% were 65 years of age or older. The gender makeup of the city was 54.9% male and 45.1% female.

=== 2010 census ===
As of the census of 2010, there were 538 people, 250 households, and 142 families residing in the city. The population density was 698.7 inhabitants per square mile (269.8/km^{2}). There were 305 housing units at an average density of 396.1 per square mile (152.9/km^{2}). The racial makeup of the city was 93.3% White, 1.3% African American, 0.2% Asian, 3.9% from other races, and 1.3% from two or more races. Hispanic or Latino of any race were 18.4% of the population.

There were 250 households, of which 21.2% had children under the age of 18 living with them, 44.8% were married couples living together, 7.6% had a female householder with no husband present, 4.4% had a male householder with no wife present, and 43.2% were non-families. 38.4% of all households were made up of individuals, and 19.2% had someone living alone who was 65 years of age or older. The average household size was 2.15 and the average family size was 2.77.

The median age in the city was 47.8 years. 19.5% of residents were under the age of 18; 5.5% were between the ages of 18 and 24; 20.2% were from 25 to 44; 29.3% were from 45 to 64; and 25.5% were 65 years of age or older. The gender makeup of the city was 48.9% male and 51.1% female.

=== 2000 census ===
As of the census of 2000, there were 675 people, 290 households, and 164 families residing in the city. The population density was 867.3 inhabitants per square mile (334.9/km^{2}). There were 320 housing units at an average density of 411.2 per square mile (158.8/km^{2}). The racial makeup of the city was 92.30% White, 0.89% Asian, 6.37% from other races, and 0.44% from two or more races. Hispanic or Latino of any race were 9.19% of the population.

There were 290 households, out of which 21.7% had children under the age of 18 living with them, 47.2% were married couples living together, 7.6% had a female householder with no husband present, and 43.4% were non-families. 40.0% of all households were made up of individuals, and 23.1% had someone living alone who was 65 years of age or older. The average household size was 2.21 and the average family size was 2.97.

20.0% were under the age of 18, 7.4% from 18 to 24, 25.5% from 25 to 44, 20.9% from 45 to 64, and 26.2% were 65 years of age or older. The median age was 42 years. For every 100 females, there were 89.6 males. For every 100 females age 18 and over, there were 85.6 males.

The median income for a household in the city was $26,141, and the median income for a family was $35,156. Males had a median income of $22,386 versus $25,500 for females. The per capita income for the city was $15,109. About 8.1% of families and 7.7% of the population were below the poverty line, including 9.1% of those under age 18 and 7.4% of those age 65 or over.

== Convention Center ==
In 2003, the Dows Community Convention Center was built on Ellsworth Street. The building was modeled similarly to the Exchange Block that once stood as the cornerstone building to the north side of Ellsworth Street. The building includes a 4,800-square-foot (450 m^{2}) convention room and a 360-square-foot (33 m^{2}) meeting room.

== Education ==
The Dows Community School served the educational needs of the area for over 100 years. The original 3-story school building was constructed in 1914 with major additions built in 1935, 1954, 1961, and 1980. The last class to graduate from Dows High School graduated in 1998. That Fall, Dows entered a 2-way whole grade sharing agreement with CAL Community School (Latimer). Dows maintained an elementary and a shared Dows-CAL Middle School. In 2005, Dows ended their partnership with CAL and entered a 1-way whole grade sharing agreement with Clarion-Goldfield CSD, with the Dows Elementary remaining until 2014. The current community is within the Clarion–Goldfield–Dows Community School District, which was formed by the merger of the Dows Community School District and the Clarion–Goldfield Community School District on July 1, 2014. The school property in Dows was later on purchased.

== Churches ==
The Dows area is home to several churches. The Dows First Lutheran Church is affiliated with the Evangelical Lutheran Church in America (ELCA). The Dows United Methodist Church meets in their historic building constructed in 1896. The Sovereign Grace Church is an independent Reformed church that meets in the former First Presbyterian Church. Located six miles east of town is the Morgan Methodist Church. Also, southwest of town is the Vernon Lutheran Church, which no longer has services. Churches that have closed in town include the Dows First Presbyterian Church (PCUSA) and Abundant Life Chapel (Non-Denominational). The First Presbyterian Church is owned by the Dows American Legion and is available to rent for events.

== Dows Corn Days ==
The first weekend in August always marks a large celebration, the Dows Corn Days. The festivities include an impressive parade, entertainment in the park, food vendors, inflatable rides, several activities, and a community church service.
