= Cavour, South Dakota =

- Town
- Location in Beadle County and the state of South Dakota
- Coordinates: 44°22′10″N 98°02′31″W
- Country: United States
- State: South Dakota
- County: Beadle
- Incorporated: 1881

Area
  - Total: 0.41 sq mi (1.06 km^{2})
  - Land: 0.41 sq mi (1.06 km^{2})
  - Water: 0 sq mi (0.00 km^{2})
- Elevation: 1,303 ft (397 m)

Population (2020)
  - Total: 128
  - Density: 312.0/sq mi (120.47/km^{2})
- Time zone: UTC-6 (Central (CST))
  - Summer (DST): UTC-5 (CDT)
- ZIP code: 57324
- Area code: 605
- FIPS code: 46-10620
- GNIS feature ID: 1267314

Cavour is a town in Beadle County, South Dakota, United States. The population was 128 at the 2020 census.

== History ==
Cavour was laid out in 1880. The town was named for Camillo Benso, Count of Cavour, an Italian statesman.

== 2003 tornado outbreak ==
On June 24, 2003, at approximately 9:30 pm, an F3 tornado passed southwest of town, sparing the town by 1 1/2 miles.

== Geography ==
According to the United States Census Bureau, the town has a total area of 0.41 square miles (1.06 km^{2}), all land.

== Demographics ==
Historical population
Census	Pop.	Note	%±
1900	98		—
1910	408		316.3%
1920	249		−39.0%
1930	202		−18.9%
1940	138		−31.7%
1950	154		11.6%
1960	140		−9.1%
1970	134		−4.3%
1980	117		−12.7%
1990	166		41.9%
2000	141		−15.1%
2010	114		−19.1%
2020	128		12.3%
U.S. Decennial Census

=== 2010 census ===
As of the census of 2010, there were 114 people, 56 households, and 30 families residing in the town. The population density was 278.0 inhabitants per square mile (107.3/km^{2}). There were 61 housing units at an average density of 148.8 per square mile (57.5/km^{2}). The racial makeup of the town was 93.9% White, 3.5% from other races, and 2.6% from two or more races. Hispanic or Latino of any race were 7.9% of the population.

There were 56 households, of which 17.9% had children under the age of 18 living with them, 46.4% were married couples living together, 3.6% had a female householder with no husband present, 3.6% had a male householder with no wife present, and 46.4% were non-families. 39.3% of all households were made up of individuals, and 12.5% had someone living alone who was 65 years of age or older. The average household size was 2.04 and the average family size was 2.80.

The median age in the town was 49 years. 15.8% of residents were under the age of 18; 5.3% were between the ages of 18 and 24; 21.9% were from 25 to 44; 41.1% were from 45 to 64; and 15.8% were 65 years of age or older. The gender makeup of the town was 57.0% male and 43.0% female.

=== 2000 census ===
As of the census of 2000, there were 141 people, 60 households, and 39 families residing in the town. The population density was 338.0 inhabitants per square mile (130.5/km^{2}). There were 71 housing units at an average density of 170.2 per square mile (65.7/km^{2}). The racial makeup of the town was 97.16% White, and 2.84% from two or more races.

There were 60 households, out of which 31.7% had children under the age of 18 living with them, 53.3% were married couples living together, 10.0% had a female householder with no husband present, and 35.0% were non-families. 33.3% of all households were made up of individuals, and 10.0% had someone living alone who was 65 years of age or older. The average household size was 2.35 and the average family size was 3.05.

In the town, the population was spread out, with 29.1% under the age of 18, 2.8% from 18 to 24, 29.8% from 25 to 44, 26.2% from 45 to 64, and 12.1% who were 65 years of age or older. The median age was 39 years. For every 100 females, there were 95.8 males. For every 100 females age 18 and over, there were 85.2 males.

The median income for a household in the town was $27,750, and the median income for a family was $38,750. Males had a median income of $24,688 versus $21,250 for females. The per capita income for the town was $15,358. There were 5.9% of families and 2.5% of the population living below the poverty line, including no under eighteens and none of those over 64.
