= Letcher, South Dakota =

- Town
- Motto: "The Right Place...To Call Home!"
- Location in Sanborn County and the state of South Dakota
- Coordinates: 43°53′58″N 98°08′39″W
- Country: United States
- State: South Dakota
- County: Sanborn
- Settled: 1883

Area
  - Total: 0.65 sq mi (1.69 km^{2})
  - Land: 0.61 sq mi (1.59 km^{2})
  - Water: 0.039 sq mi (0.10 km^{2})
- Elevation: 1,303 ft (397 m)

Population (2020)
  - Total: 159
  - Density: 258.2/sq mi (99.71/km^{2})
- Time zone: UTC-6 (Central (CST))
  - Summer (DST): UTC-5 (CDT)
- ZIP code: 57359
- Area code: 605
- FIPS code: 46-36620
- GNIS feature ID: 1267462
- Website: http://www.letchersd.com/

Letcher is a town in Sanborn County, South Dakota, United States. The population was 159 at the 2020 census.

Letcher has the name of O. T. Letcher, a local landowner.

== Geography ==
According to the United States Census Bureau, the town has a total area of 0.66 square miles (1.71 km^{2}), of which 0.62 square miles (1.61 km^{2}) is land and 0.04 square miles (0.10 km^{2}) is water.

== Demographics ==
Historical population
Census	Pop.	Note	%±
1900	130		—
1910	402		209.2%
1920	454		12.9%
1930	414		−8.8%
1940	344		−16.9%
1950	291		−15.4%
1960	296		1.7%
1970	201		−32.1%
1980	221		10.0%
1990	164		−25.8%
2000	177		7.9%
2010	173		−2.3%
2020	159		−8.1%
U.S. Decennial Census

=== 2010 census ===
As of the census of 2010, there were 173 people, 77 households, and 42 families residing in the town. The population density was 279.0 inhabitants per square mile (107.7/km^{2}). There were 83 housing units at an average density of 133.9 per square mile (51.7/km^{2}). The racial makeup of the town was 100.0% White.

There were 77 households, of which 31.2% had children under the age of 18 living with them, 41.6% were married couples living together, 7.8% had a female householder with no husband present, 5.2% had a male householder with no wife present, and 45.5% were non-families. 39.0% of all households were made up of individuals, and 15.6% had someone living alone who was 65 years of age or older. The average household size was 2.25 and the average family size was 3.07.

The median age in the town was 38.6 years. 23.7% of residents were under the age of 18; 8.7% were between the ages of 18 and 24; 25.4% were from 25 to 44; 30% were from 45 to 64; and 12.1% were 65 years of age or older. The gender makeup of the town was 51.4% male and 48.6% female.

=== 2000 census ===
As of the census of 2000, there were 177 people, 75 households, and 51 families residing in the town. The population density was 291.5 inhabitants per square mile (112.5/km^{2}). There were 84 housing units at an average density of 138.4 per square mile (53.4/km^{2}). The racial makeup of the town was 97.74% White, 0.56% Asian, 0.56% Pacific Islander, and 1.13% from two or more races.

There were 75 households, out of which 32.0% had children under the age of 18 living with them, 54.7% were married couples living together, 6.7% had a female householder with no husband present, and 32.0% were non-families. 24.0% of all households were made up of individuals, and 10.7% had someone living alone who was 65 years of age or older. The average household size was 2.36 and the average family size was 2.78.

In the town, the population was spread out, with 24.9% under the age of 18, 9.0% from 18 to 24, 26.6% from 25 to 44, 20.9% from 45 to 64, and 18.6% who were 65 years of age or older. The median age was 40 years. For every 100 females, there were 103.4 males. For every 100 females age 18 and over, there were 101.5 males.

The median income for a household in the town was $27,083, and the median income for a family was $37,083. Males had a median income of $22,917 versus $15,208 for females. The per capita income for the town was $14,164. About 18.6% of families and 24.0% of the population were below the poverty line, including 42.9% of those under the age of eighteen and 10.7% of those 65 or over.

== Education ==
Letcher Public Schools are part of the Sanborn Central School District. The district includes an elementary school, middle school and high school. Students attend Sanborn Central High School.
