= Boone River =

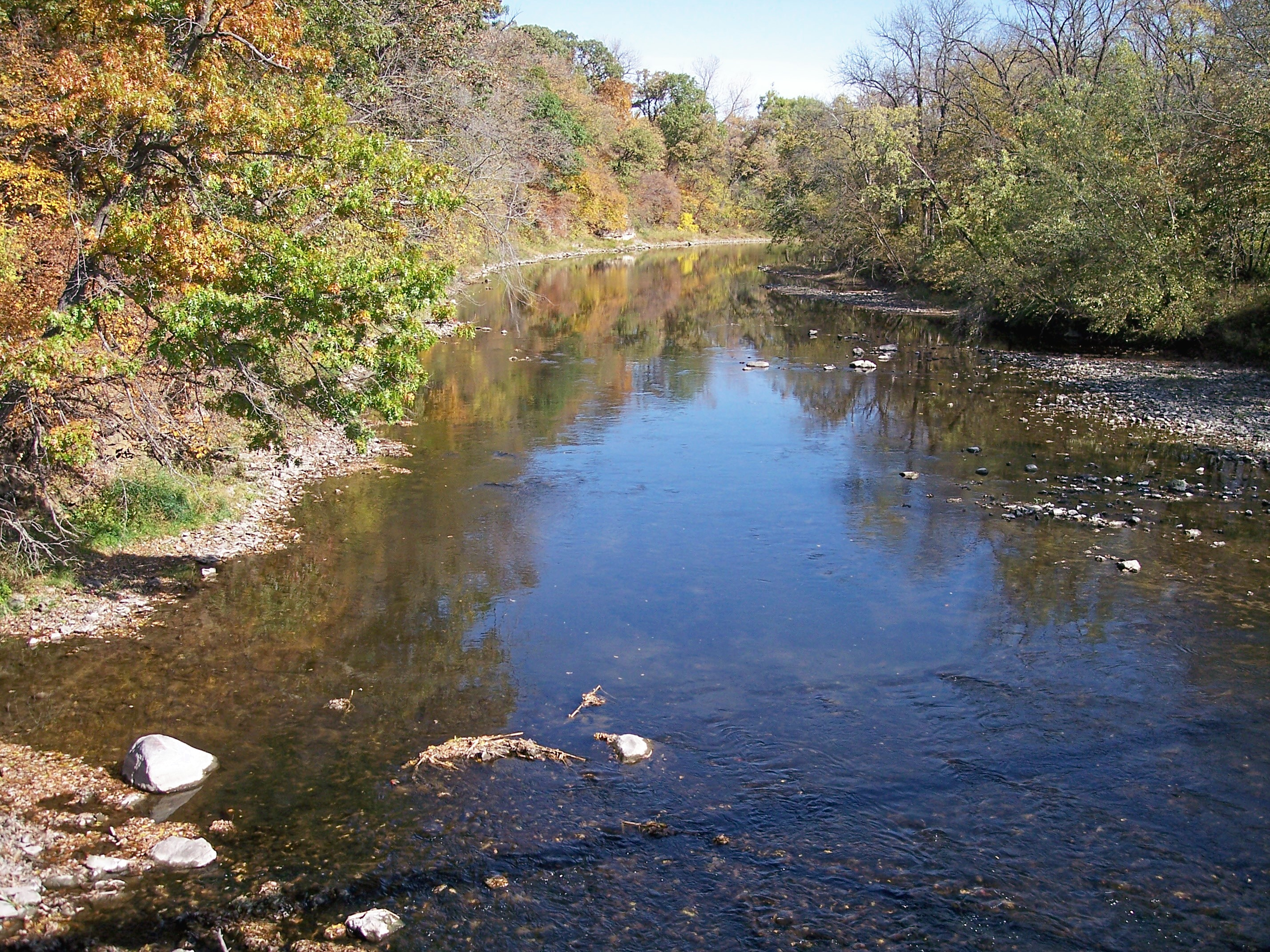
- The Boone River south of Webster City, Iowa

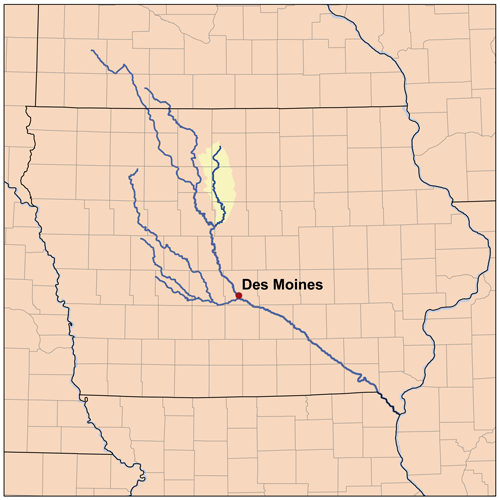
- Des Moines River basin with Boone River highlighted

Location
- Country: US
- State: Iowa
- District: Hamilton County, Iowa, Webster County, Iowa, Wright County, Iowa, Hancock County, Iowa

Physical characteristics
- Source
  - coordinates: 43.1397°N 93.8744°W
- Mouth: Des Moines River
  - location: Stratford, Iowa, US
  - coordinates: 42.3105°N 93.9361°W
  - elevation: 909 ft (277 m)
- Discharge
  - location: mouth
  - average: 612.48 cu ft/s (17.344 m^{3}/s) (estimate)

Basin features
- Tributaries
  - left: Middle Branch Boone River
  - right: East Branch Boone River

The Boone River is a tributary of the Des Moines River in north-central Iowa in the United States. It is 111 miles (179 km) long and drains an area of 895 square miles (2,320 km^{2}). Via the Des Moines River, it is part of the watershed of the Mississippi River.

== About ==
The Boone River rises near Britt in western Hancock County and flows generally southwardly through Wright, Hamilton and Webster counties, past Goldfield and Webster City. It flows into the Des Moines River 17 miles (27 km) north of Boone.

Tributaries of the Boone River also drain portions of Kossuth and Humboldt counties. Two headwaters tributaries are known as the East Branch Boone River and the Middle Branch Boone River.

The Iowa Department of Natural Resources has designated the lower 26 miles (42 km) of the Boone River from Webster City to its mouth as a "Protected Water Area". This stretch of the river cuts through a wooded valley and allows canoeing and fishing for smallmouth bass, channel catfish, walleye, northern pike and flathead catfish.

== See also ==
- List of Iowa rivers
