= Ames High School =

Public secondary school in Ames, Iowa, United States

Location
- 1801 Ridgewood Avenue; Ames, Iowa 50010; United States; 42.040209°N 93.634203°W

Information
- School type: Public high school
- Motto: Ames Hi Aims High
- Founded: 1875 (1961)
- School district: Ames Community School District
- Teaching staff: 81.99 (FTE)
- Grades: 9–12
- Enrollment: 1,440 (2024-2025)
- Student to teacher ratio: 17.56
- Campus type: Suburban
- Colors: Orange and Black
- Slogan: "Ames Hi Aims High"
- Athletics conference: Iowa Alliance Conference
- Nickname: Little Cyclones
- Newspaper: The WEB
- Yearbook: SPIRIT
- Website: https://ahs.amescsd.org/

Ames High School is the sole public high school in Ames, Iowa, United States. It is in the Ames Community School District.

Residents of the United Community School District, which covers Luther, a small section of Boone, and other areas, often select the Ames district for secondary schooling.

== Academics ==
This school is the only public high school in the city of Ames. In August 2019, Ames High School was named the top high school in Iowa by US News & World Report.

== Athletics ==
The Ames Little Cyclones are members of the Iowa Alliance Conference, formerly in the Central Iowa Metro League. Starting for the 2026-27 seasons, Ames will compete in the more competitive Little Hawkeye Conference. Teams sponsored by the school include football, boys and girls cross-country, boys golf, girls swimming, and volleyball in the fall season. During the winter season, the school sponsored sports are boys and girls basketball, wrestling, and boys swimming. The spring consists of girls golf, boys and girls track, boys and girls tennis, and boys and girls soccer. The summer sports are baseball and softball.

=== State Championship History ===
The girls' golf team was crowned champions for the State Tournament in 1989, 2009, 2010, and most recently in 2025. The boys' golf team are 5-time state champions (1945, 1949, 1968, 1982, 1986).

The Ames High girls' swim team won four state meets in a row from 2010 to 2013, and again in 2015, 2016, and 2017. The boys' team won the state meet in 1982 and 2018.

The Ames High cheer squad has won 11 large group state championships (1991, 1992, 1993, 1994, 1996, 2009, 2011, 2013, 2014, 2015, 2024). They have also won two state titles in small group stunt: 4A All-Girl Stunt in 2012 and Coed Stunt in 2024.

The Ames High boys' basketball team has won nine state championships (1936, 1945, 1955, 1973, 1976, 1991, 2009, 2010, 2022). The Ames High boys basketball team is the winningest program among Iowa 4A high schools.

The girls' soccer team won the Class 3A state championship for the first time in 2017.

The Ames High girls' tennis team won the 2A State title four years in a row (2009, 2010, 2011, 2012) and again in 2019. For the first time in school history, the boys' tennis team won the Class 2A state championship in 2011.

Since 1941, Ames High has won 20 state championships in boys' track and field, the most recent in 1991. The girls' team has won five championships (1987, 1988, 1992, 1995, 1996). The boys' cross country team have won six state championships (1967, 1968, 1973, 1975, 1983, 1989).

The Ames High Baseball team is a consistent contender in 4A, finishing at runner up in 2023, and winning a state title in 1961.

== Notable alumni ==
- Harrison Barnes, current NBA player for the San Antonio Spurs and 2015 NBA Finals champion.
- Robert L. Bartley, editor of The Wall Street Journal editorial page for more than 30 years, winner of Pulitzer Prize and Presidential Medal of Freedom
- Steve Dreyer, former MLB player (Texas Rangers)
- Jane Espenson, television writer and producer of Buffy the Vampire Slayer
- Joe Evans, American college football defensive end for the Iowa Hawkeyes
- Dick Gibbs, NBA player for several teams.
- Leslie Hall, rap artist and front-woman of Leslie and the Ly's
- Fred Hoiberg, current Nebraska Cornhuskers men's basketball coach and former NBA player and coach
- Michelle Hoover, author "Bottomland", "The Quickening"
- Stephen Hsu, physics professor, university administrator and tech executive
- Dame DeAnne Shirly Julius, current Economist
- Ted Kooser, poet and 13th Poet Laureate of United States, recipient of the 2005 Pulitzer Prize for Poetry
- Tamin Lipsey, point guard for the Iowa State Cyclones
- Margaret Lloyd, operatic soprano
- Doug McDermott, current NBA player for the Sacramento Kings
- Edward Mezvinsky, former congressman in United States House of Representatives
- Beverley Owen, actress best known for playing the role of Marilyn in The Munsters
- Brian Smith, photographer and author of Art & Soul
- Nate Staniforth, magician
- Neal Stephenson, contributor to Wired and author known for his speculative fiction works

== See also ==
- List of high schools in Iowa
