= Satellite tornado =

Smaller tornado that orbits around a larger parent tornado

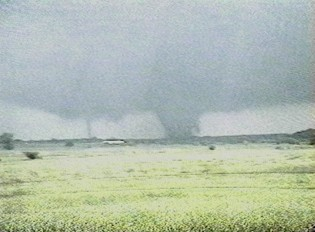
- The large tornado on the right is the 1999 Chickasha F3 tornado and the small tornado to the left is a satellite tornado.
- Area of occurrence: Every continent except Antarctica
- Season: Any, though primarily in spring or summer
- Effect: Wind damage

A satellite tornado is a tornado that revolves around a larger, primary tornado and interacts with the same mesocyclone. Satellite tornadoes occur apart from the primary tornado and are not considered subvortices; the primary tornado and satellite tornadoes are considered to be separate tornadoes. The cause of satellite tornadoes is not known. Such tornadoes are more often anticyclonic than are typical tornadoes and these pairs may be referred to as tornado couplets. Satellite tornadoes commonly occur in association with very powerful, large, and destructive tornadoes, indicative also of the strength and severity of the parent supercell thunderstorm.

Satellite tornadoes are relatively uncommon. When a satellite tornado does occur, there is often more than one orbiting satellite spawned during the life cycle of the tornado or with successive primary tornadoes spawned by the parent supercell (a process known as cyclic tornadogenesis and leading to a tornado family). On tornado outbreak days, if satellite tornadoes occur with one supercell, there is an elevated probability of their occurrence with other supercells.

Satellite tornadoes tend to orbit their parent cyclonically, counterclockwise in the Northern Hemisphere, and clockwise in the Southern Hemisphere, and will generally form near the edge of a supercell's mesocyclone, and gradually travel inward to the parent tornado. Satellite tornadoes may merge into their companion tornado although the appearance of this occurring is often an illusion caused when an orbiting tornado revolves around the backside of a primary tornado obscuring view of the satellite. During the March 1990 Central United States tornado outbreak, one member of a tornado family (rated F5) constricted and became a satellite tornado of the next tornado of the family before merging into the new primary tornado which soon also intensified to F5.

== Examples ==
Some examples of tornado couplets include the Tri-State Tornado, multiple tornadoes during the 1999 Oklahoma tornado outbreak, the 2007 Greensburg tornado, and the 2013 El Reno tornado. Satellite tornadoes are more likely to be recognized in recent decades than in the far past as eyewitness accounts as well as damage survey information are often available for later events. The advent of storm chasing, in particular, boosts the likelihood that satellite tornadoes are noticed visually and/or on mobile radar. These tornadoes may remain over open country and thus cause less structural damage and consequently are less widely known. Such examples include near Beloit, Kansas on 15 May 1990 and during Project VORTEX near Allison, Texas on 8 June 1995, among other events.

=== List of confirmed satellite tornadoes ===
| Date | Primary F#/EF# | Primary location | Satellite F#/EF# | Satellite location | Fatalities (Note: This includes any fatalities from the parent and satellite tornadoes) | Event |
|---|---|---|---|---|---|---|
| May 30, 1879 | 'F4’ (Note: This tornado's rating is unofficial.) | SW of Randolph, Kansas to Irving, Kansas to Dawson's Mill, Nebraska (Note: This track was probably a tornado family.) | F? | NW of Randolph, Kansas | 18 (60 injuries) | |
| October 27, 1913 | F3 | Treforest, Wales to Abercynon, Wales to Edwardsville, Wales to W of Bedlinog, Wales | F1 | W of Treforest, Wales to S of Cilfynydd, Wales | 6 (150 Injuries) | 1913 United Kingdom tornado outbreak |
| May 16, 1961 | F1 | S of Mount Dora, New Mexico to NW of Clayton, New Mexico | F0 | Mount Dora, New Mexico | 0 | Tornado outbreak sequence of May 14–June 1, 1962 (List) |
| June 13, 1976 | F5 | SW of Luther, Iowa to Jordan, Iowa to SW of Gilbert, Iowa | F2 | S to N of Jordan, Iowa | 0 (9 injuries) | Tornadoes of 1976#June 13 |
| June 13, 1976 | F5 | SW of Luther, Iowa to Jordan, Iowa to SW of Gilbert, Iowa | F3 | NE of Jordan, Iowa | 0 (9 injuries) | Tornadoes of 1976#June 13 |
| June 13, 1976 | F4 | Lemont, Illinois to S of Downers Grove, Illinois | F1 | SW of Lemont, Illinois | 2 (23 injuries) | Tornadoes of 1976#June 13 |
| June 13, 1976 | F4 | Lemont, Illinois to S of Downers Grove, Illinois | F0 | S of Lemont, Illinois | 2 (23 injuries) | Tornadoes of 1976#June 13 |
| March 13, 1990 | F5 | Castleton, Kansas to Hesston, Kansas | F5 | Goessel, Kansas to NE of Hillsboro, Kansas | 2 | March 1990 Central United States tornado outbreak |
| March 1, 1997 | F2 | S of College Station, Arkansas | F2 | S of College Station, Arkansas | 0 | March 1997 tornado outbreak |
| May 3, 1999 | F5 | SSW of Amber, Oklahoma to Moore, Oklahoma to W of Midwest City, Oklahoma | F0 | N of Newcastle, Oklahoma | 36 (583 injuries) | 1999 Bridge Creek–Moore tornado |
| April 20, 2004 | F2 | N of Utica, Illinois to Ottawa, Illinois | F0 | E of Utica, Illinois | 0 | Tornado outbreak of April 20, 2004 |
| May 4, 2007 | EF5 | Greensburg, Kansas | | | | |
| May 4, 2007 | EF5 | Greensburg, Kansas | EF0 | E of Greensburg, Kansas | 11 (63 injuries) | 2007 Greensburg tornado |
| May 4, 2007 | EF5 | Greensburg, Kansas | EF0 | Near Greensburg, Kansas | 11 (63 injuries) | 2007 Greensburg tornado |
| May 4, 2007 | EF5 | Greensburg, Kansas | EF0 | Near Greensburg, Kansas | 11 (63 injuries) | 2007 Greensburg tornado |
| May 4, 2007 | EF5 | Greensburg, Kansas | EF1 | Near Greensburg, Kansas | 11 (63 injuries) | 2007 Greensburg tornado |
| May 4, 2007 | EF5 | Greensburg, Kansas | EF1 | Near Greensburg, Kansas | 11 (63 injuries) | 2007 Greensburg tornado |
| May 4, 2007 | EF5 | Greensburg, Kansas | EF0 | NE of Greensburg, Kansas | 11 (63 injuries) | 2007 Greensburg tornado |
| May 4, 2007 | EF5 | Greensburg, Kansas | EF0 | N of Greensburg, Kansas | 11 (63 injuries) | 2007 Greensburg tornado |
| May 4, 2007 | EF5 | Greensburg, Kansas | EF0 | E of Greensburg, Kansas | 11 (63 injuries) | 2007 Greensburg tornado |
| May 4, 2007 | EF5 | Greensburg, Kansas | EF1 | E of Greensburg, Kansas | 11 (63 injuries) | 2007 Greensburg tornado |
| May 4, 2007 | EF5 | Greensburg, Kansas | EF0 | E of Greensburg, Kansas | 11 (63 injuries) | 2007 Greensburg tornado |
| May 23, 2008 | EF2 | N of Laird, Kansas | EF2 | SE of Arnold, Kansas | 0 | Tornado outbreak sequence of May 22–31, 2008 |
| May 10, 2010 | EF3 | SW of Wakita, Oklahoma to E of Hunnewell, Kansas | EF0 | NW of Medford, Oklahoma | 0 (2 injuries) | Tornado outbreak of May 10–13, 2010 |
| June 17, 2010 | EF4 | E of Conger, Minnesota to W of Albert Lea, Minnesota | EF1 | Armstrong, Minnesota | 1 (14 injuries) | 2010 Conger–Albert Lea tornado |
| April 9, 2011 | EF3 | W of Nemaha, Iowa to N of Ware, Iowa | EF2 | SE of Newell, Iowa | 0 | April 2011 Iowa tornadoes |
| April 9, 2011 | EF3 | W of Nemaha, Iowa to N of Ware, Iowa | EF4 | W of Pocahontas, Iowa | 0 | April 2011 Iowa tornadoes |
| April 9, 2011 | EF3 | W of Nemaha, Iowa to N of Ware, Iowa | EF1 | NE of Varina, Iowa | 0 | April 2011 Iowa tornadoes |
| April 9, 2011 | EF3 | W of Nemaha, Iowa to N of Ware, Iowa | EF1 | NE of Varina, Iowa | 0 | April 2011 Iowa tornadoes |
| April 9, 2011 | EF3 | W of Nemaha, Iowa to N of Ware, Iowa | EF2 | WSW of Pocahontas, Iowa | 0 | April 2011 Iowa tornadoes |
| May 24, 2011 | EF5 | ESE of Hinton to Piedmont to NE of Guthrie, Oklahoma | EF0 | NW of Richland, Oklahoma | 9 (181 injuries) | 2011 El Reno–Piedmont tornado |
| November 7, 2011 | EF4 | SSW of Tipton, Oklahoma | EF0 | S of Tipton, Oklahoma | 0 | Tornadoes of 2011#November 7–8 |
| May 28, 2013 | EF3 | S of Centralia, Kansas | EF1 | W of Corning, Kansas | 0 | Tornado outbreak of May 26–31, 2013 |
| May 31, 2013 | EF3 | WSW of El Reno, Oklahoma to W of Yukon, Oklahoma | EF2 | SE of El Reno, Oklahoma | 8 (151 injured) | 2013 El Reno tornado |
| April 9, 2015 | EF4 | NNE of Franklin Grove, Illinois to NNW of Kirkland, Illinois | EF0 | S of Belvidere, Illinois | 2 (11 injuries) | 2015 Rochelle–Fairdale tornado |
| April 27, 2016 | EF0 | ESE of Bedford, Iowa to S of Conway, Iowa | EF0 | S of Conway, Iowa | 0 | List of United States tornadoes from April to May 2016 |
| May 9, 2016 | EF1 | ENE of Wapanucka, Oklahoma to N of Atoka, Oklahoma | EFU | ENE of Wapanucka, Oklahoma | 0 | List of United States tornadoes from April to May 2016 |
| May 9, 2016 | EFU | NW of Sawyer, Oklahoma to S of Spencerville, Oklahoma | EFU | N of Sawyer, Oklahoma | 0 | List of United States tornadoes from April to May 2016 |
| June 22, 2016 | EF1 | WNW of West Brooklyn, Illinois to NW of Compton, Illinois | EF0 | NE of West Brooklyn, Illinois | 0 | List of United States tornadoes from June to August 2016 |
| June 6, 2018 | EF3 | N of Laramie, Wyoming | EF2 | N of Laramie, Wyoming | 0 | Tornadoes of 2018#June 6–8 |
| July 19, 2018 | EF3 | Eastern Pella, Iowa | EF0 | NE of Pella, Iowa | 0 (13 injuries) | from June to July 2018 |
| November 25, 2018 | F2 | Gulf of Taranto to Patù, Italy to Corsano, Italy to eastern Tricase, Italy | FU | Gulf of Taranto | 0 | Tornadoes of 2018#November 25 (Italy) |
| April 30, 2019 | EF2 | NW of Talala, Oklahoma | EFU | W of Talala, Oklahoma | 0 | List of United States tornadoes in April 2019 |
| September 10, 2019 | EF2 | N of Fort Laramie, Wyoming to NE of Lingle, Wyoming | EFU | N of Fort Laramie, Wyoming to NE of Lingle, Wyoming | 0 | List of United States tornadoes from September to October 2019 |
| March 13, 2021 | EF2 | SW of Happy, Texas to ESE of Canyon, Texas | EF1 | N of Happy, Texas | 0 | March 2021 North American blizzard |
| April 27, 2021 | EFU | N of Haswell, Colorado | EFU | NNE of Haswell, Colorado | 0 | List of United States tornadoes from April to June 2021 |
| May 19, 2021 | EF0 | NW of Medford, Minnesota | EF0 | NW of Medford, Minnesota | 0 | List of United States tornadoes from April to June 2021 |
| July 13, 2021 | EF2 | NE of Beachburg, Ontario to L'Île-du-Grand-Calumet, Quebec | EF1 | Sullivan Island, Ontario to Butternut Island, Ontario | 0 | |
| September 29, 2021 | F1 | Kiel, Germany (Meimersdorf District) | FU | Kieler Förde, Germany | 0 (7 injured) | Tornadoes of 2021#September 29 (Germany) |
| October 12, 2021 | EF1 | Clinton, Oklahoma to SSE of Custer City, Oklahoma | EFU | NE of Clinton, Oklahoma | 0 | |
| December 11, 2021 | EF3 | SW of Bowling Green, Kentucky to S of Plum Springs, Kentucky to NNW of Rocky Hill, Kentucky | EF2 | Southeastern Bowling Green, Kentucky to SE of Plum Springs, Kentucky | 16 (63 injuries) | 2021 Bowling Green tornadoes |
| March 5, 2022 | EF3 | E of Derby, Iowa to E of Chariton, Iowa | EF0 | S of Chariton, Iowa | 1 (1 injured) | Tornado outbreak of March 5–7, 2022 |
| April 5, 2022 | EF2 | NNE of Bladon Springs, Alabama to W of McEntyre, Alabama | EF1 | NNE Coffeeville, Alabama | 0 | Tornado outbreak of April 4–7, 2022 |
| May 4, 2022 | EF2 | W of Maud, Oklahoma to E of Little, Oklahoma | EF0 | NE of Seminole, Oklahoma to ESE of Little, Oklahoma | 0 | Tornadoes of 2022#May 4–6 (Central and Eastern United States) |
| December 14, 2022 | EF2 | New Iberia, Louisiana | EFU | SSW New Iberia, Louisiana | 0 (16 injuries) | Tornado outbreak of December 12–15, 2022 |
| June 28, 2023 | EF0 | SW of Kimball | EFU | SW of Kimball | 0 | |
| April 30, 2024 | EF1 | NE of Hollister, Oklahoma | EF1 | SW of Loveland, Oklahoma | 0 | Tornadoes of 2024#April 30 – May 4 (United States) |
| May 25, 2024 | EF3 | NE of Celina, Texas | EF1 | NNW of Celina, Texas to W of Weston, Texas | 0 | Tornado outbreak of May 25–27, 2024 |
| April 5, 2025 | EF1 | S of Curve, Tennessee to E of Gates, Tennessee | EF0 | SE of Curve, Tennessee | 0 | Tornadoes of 2025 |
| April 27, 2025 | EF2 | W of Merritt Reservoir, Nebraska | EF2 | N of Merritt Reservoir | 0 | Tornadoes of 2025 |
| May 19, 2025 | EF3 | E of Greensburg, Kansas | EFU | S of Greensburg, Kansas | 0 | Tornado outbreak of May 18–20, 2025 |
| May 19, 2025 | EF3 | Brenham, Kansas to N of Haviland, Kansas | EF0 | N of Brenham, Kansas | 0 | Tornado outbreak of May 18–20, 2025 |
| May 19, 2025 | EF3 | N of Cullison, Kansas to NE of Iuka, Kansas | EFU | N of Iuka, Kansas | 0 | Tornado outbreak of May 18–20, 2025 |
| March 10, 2026 | EF3 | Kankakee, IL to Lake Village, IN | EF1 | SW of Sun River Terrace | 3 (11 injuries) | Tornado outbreak of March 10–12, 2026 |
| March 10, 2026 | EF2 | SW of Riverside to NW of Knox | EF0 | NNE of North Judson | 0 | Tornado outbreak of March 10–12, 2026 |
| April 23, 2026 | EF1 | N of Nardin to SE of Braman | EF0 | WSW of Braman | 0 | Tornado outbreak sequence of April 23–28, 2026 |

== See also ==
- Fujiwhara effect
- Multiple-vortex tornado
