= Deibler =

Deibler is a surname of German origin, originating as an occupational surname for a dove keeper. Notable people with the surname include:

- Anatole Deibler (1863-1939), French executioner
- Markus Deibler (born 1990), German swimmer
- Steffen Deibler (born 1987), German former competitive swimmer
- Darlene Rose (née Deibler), Christian missionary

== See also ==
- Diebler
- List of executioners#France
