= Tornadoes of 1976 =

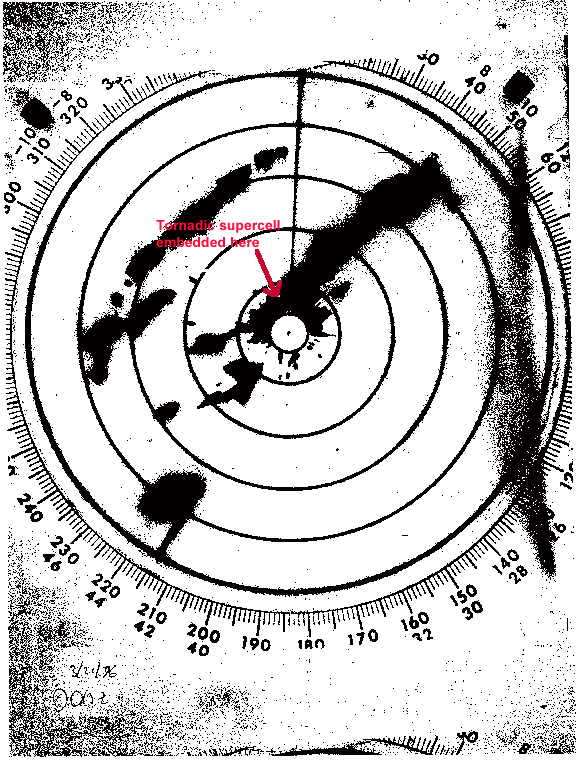
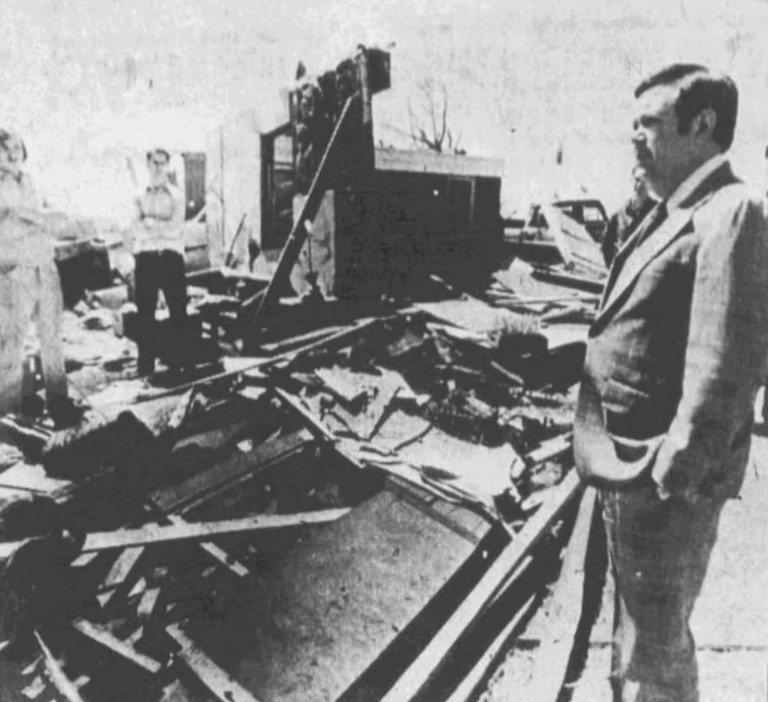
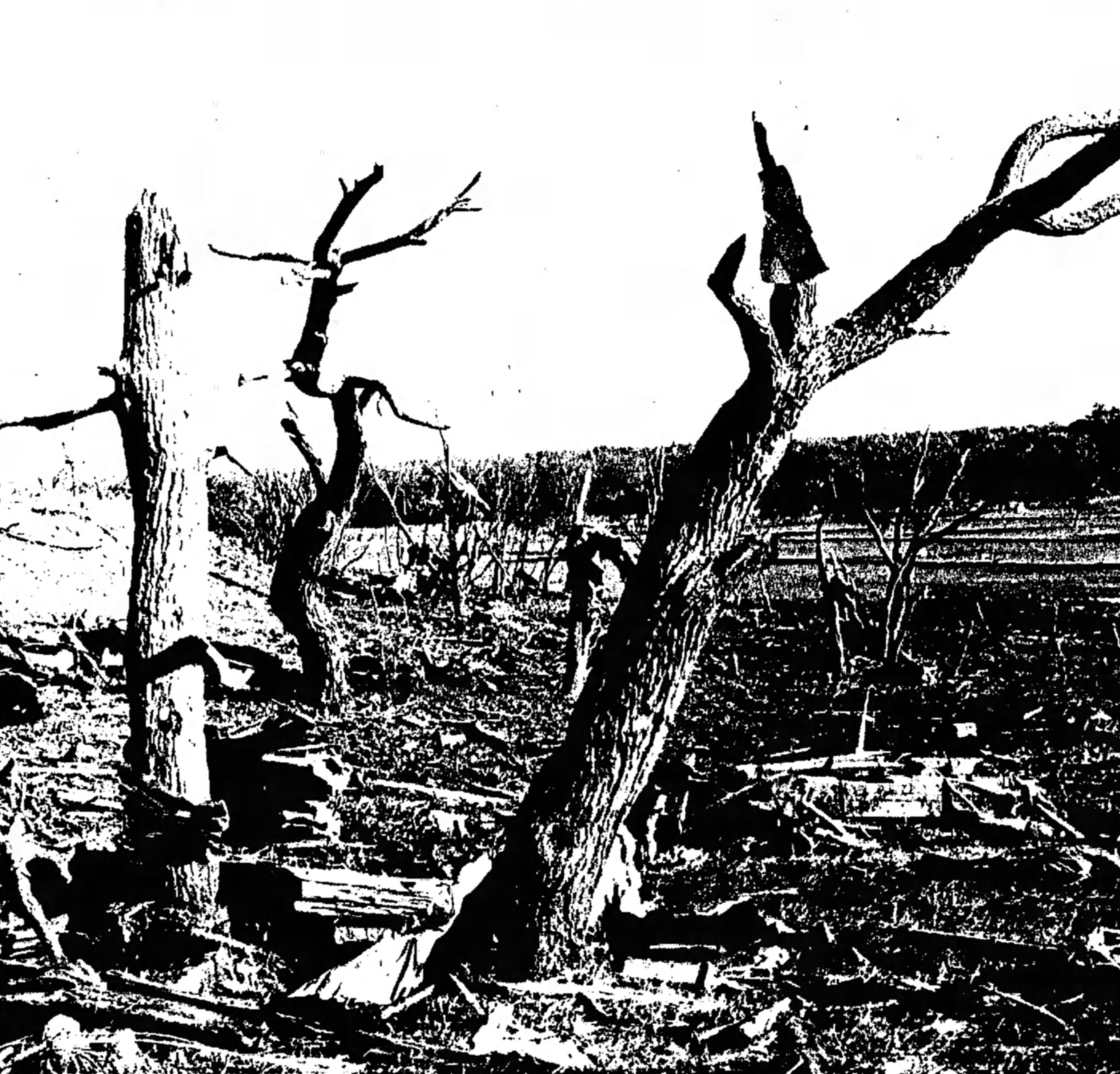
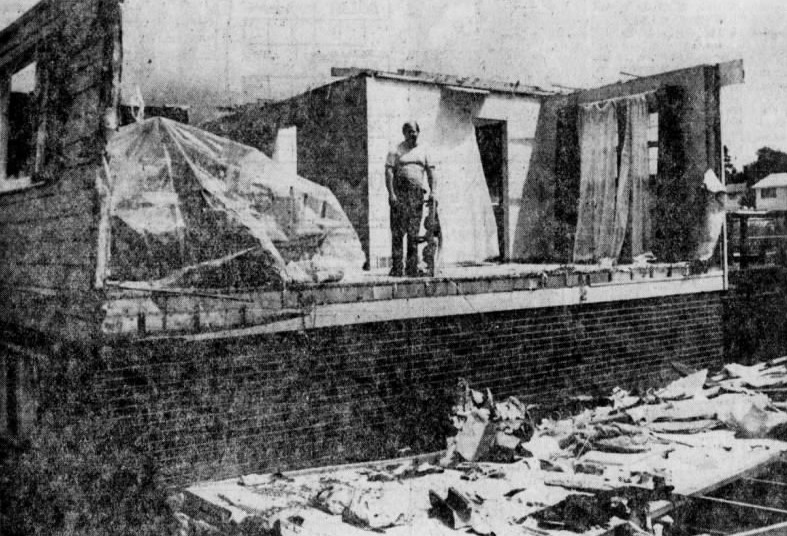
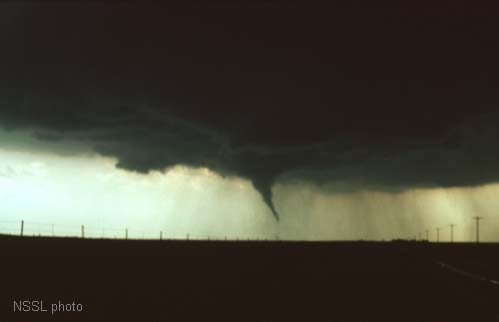
- Clockwise from top: A large F5 tornado as it struck Jordan, Iowa on June 13; The wreckage of a home in Spiro, Oklahoma after an F5 tornado on March 26; A home in Latrobe, Pennsylvania after an F3 tornado on July 11; A tornado near Waurika, Oklahoma on May 30; Trees near Brownwood, Texas after an F5 tornado on April 19; A radar image showing an embedded supercell as it produced an F4 tornado in West Bloomfield, Michigan on March 20
- Timespan: January 7 - December 7, 1976
- Maximum rated tornado: F5 tornado: Spiro, Oklahoma on March 26; Brownwood, Texas on April 19; Jordan, Iowa on June 13
- Tornadoes in U.S.: 680
- Damage (U.S.): Unknown
- Fatalities (U.S.): 44
- Fatalities (worldwide): >44

This page documents the tornadoes and tornado outbreaks of 1976, primarily in the United States. Most tornadoes form in the U.S., although some events may take place internationally. Tornado statistics for older years like this often appear significantly lower than modern years due to fewer reports or confirmed tornadoes.

== Events ==
Fatal United States tornadoes in 1976
- Approximate touchdown location of killer tornadoes in 1976
Summary of tornadoes
- February 17 – Arkansas (3 deaths)
- February 18 – Mississippi (1 death)
- February 21 – Missouri (1 death)
- March 12 – Illinois (2 deaths)
- March 12 – Illinois, Indiana (1 death)
- March 12 – Indiana (1 death)
- March 20 – Michigan (1 death)
- March 20 – Michigan (1 death)
- March 20 – Mississippi (1 death)
- March 26 – Oklahoma (1 death)
- March 26 – Oklahoma (2 deaths)
- March 26 – Missouri (1 death)
- March 29 – Mississippi (3 deaths)
- March 29 – Arkansas (5 deaths)
- March 29 – Arkansas (1 death)
- March 30 – Michigan (1 death)
- April 20 – Louisiana (1 death)
- May 15 – South Carolina (1 death)
- May 15 – North Carolina (3 deaths)
- May 26 – Texas (2 deaths)
- May 30 – Oklahoma (2 deaths)
- June 13 – Illinois (2 deaths)
- June 14 – Minnesota (1 death)
- July 11 – Pennsylvania (1 death)
- July 11 – Pennsylvania (1 death)
- August 12 – Florida (1 death)
- September 26 – Indiana (1 death)
- September 26 – Indiana (1 death)
- September 26 – Kentucky (1 death)
Total fatalities: 44

Numbers for 1976 were above average, however, the number of fatalities were significantly lower than normal.

=== United States yearly total ===
Confirmed tornadoes by Fujita rating
FU	F0	F1	F2	F3	F4	F5	Total
0	214	341	168	47	13	3	786

== January ==
12 tornadoes were confirmed in the U.S. in January.

== February ==
36 tornadoes were reported in the U.S. in February.

== March ==
180 tornadoes were reported in the U.S. in March. This set a record for tornadoes in March until it was beaten in 2022 with 222 tornadoes. The Chicago area received the most tornadoes ever recorded, including several F2 and F3 tornadoes.

=== March 20–21 ===
FU	F0	F1	F2	F3	F4	F5
0	13	24	17	8	3	0

A major outbreak shifted into mainly Illinois and Indiana. The strongest tornadoes occurred in Illinois, including an F4 tornado in Sadorus, but one F4 tornado came very close to Lafayette, Indiana. The Metro Detroit suburb of West Bloomfield Township, Michigan experienced an F4 tornado on March 20, it is to date the last tornado stronger than an F3 to strike the Metro Detroit area. More activity continued onto March 21 when the system moved across Ohio, Michigan, and Pennsylvania. Overall, 66 tornadoes touched down, killing three and injuring 189.

=== March 26 ===
FU	F0	F1	F2	F3	F4	F5
0	0	8	3	3	2	1

An F4 tornado killed one and injured four in Talihina, Oklahoma. An F5 tornado also caused extensive damage in Spiro, Oklahoma, killing two people and injuring 64. The rating of that tornado is disputed. The outbreak as a whole killed four and injured 89.

=== March 28–31 ===
FU	F0	F1	F2	F3	F4	F5
0	4	10	14	5	2	0

The last few days of the month produced a significant tornado outbreak sequence lasting about four days. The outbreak on March 29 primarily affected Arkansas and Mississippi, with an F3 tornado directly hitting Cabot, Arkansas including Cabot High School around the same time students were getting let out. Five people were killed from that tornado, none of which occurred at the high school. Another extremely long tracked F4 tornado occurred in central Mississippi, which initially touched down about 15 miles southwest of Hazlehurst, and ended north of Meridian. The tornado tracked about 127 miles before it finally dissipated, and killed 3 people.

On March 30, tornadoes started forming again, but mainly in Texas and Louisiana before entering into Mississippi yet again. Tornadoes also occurred in Michigan, including an F3 which killed a person in Logan Township, Ogemaw County, Michigan. Later that same day, another F3 tornado tracked behind where the previous F4 occurred the day before, primarily affecting areas south of Fayette, Mississippi.

In total, 35 tornadoes were confirmed in four days.

== April ==
113 tornadoes were reported in the U.S. in April.

=== April 19 ===
FU	F0	F1	F2	F3	F4	F5
0	1	4	8	2	0	1

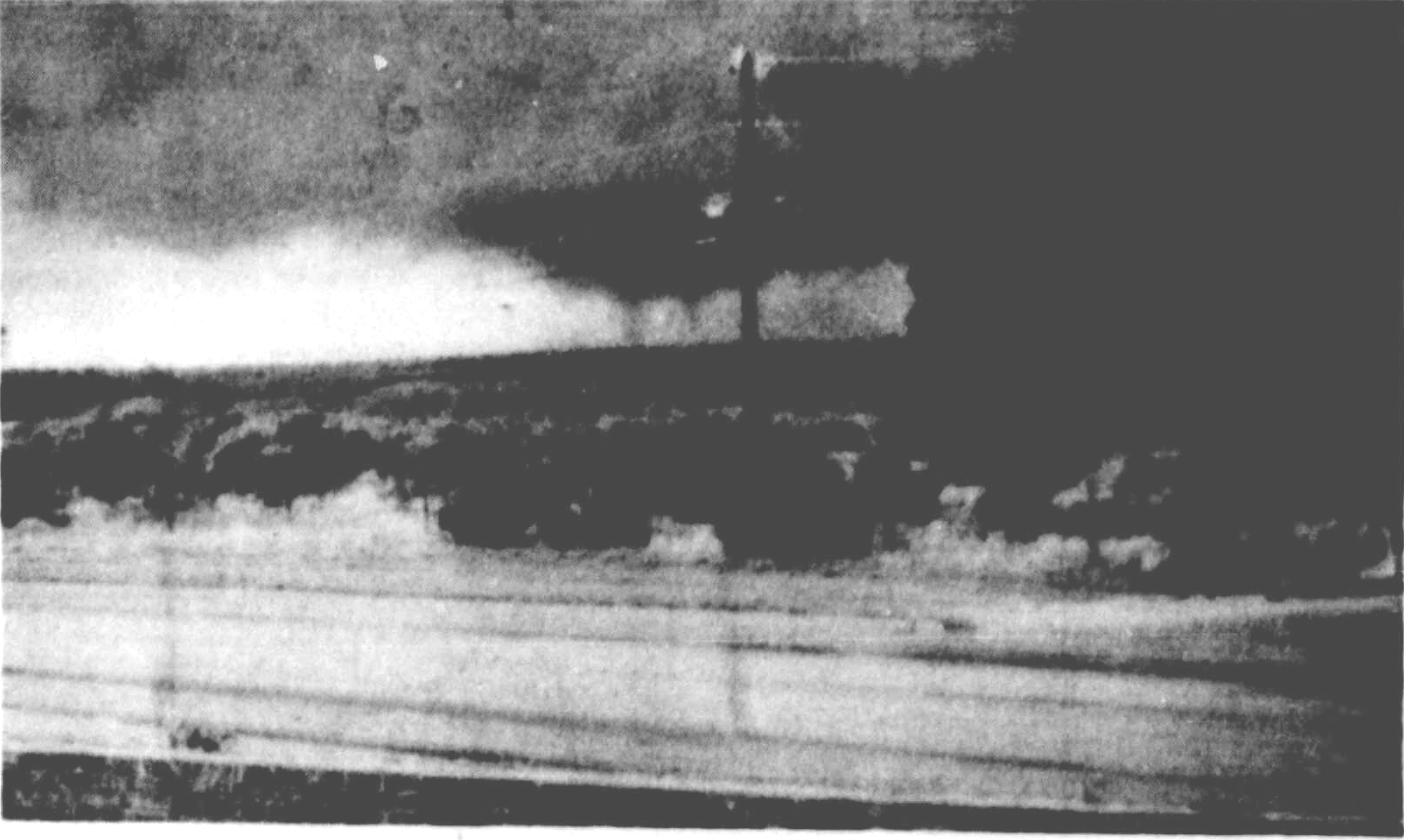
The F5 tornado that struck Brownwood, Texas seen in this Polaroid photograph.

An F5 tornado hit Brownwood, Texas, injuring 11. The rating is disputed. The outbreak as a whole injured 13.

== May ==
155 tornadoes were reported in the U.S. in May.

== June ==
169 tornadoes were reported in June in the U.S.

=== June 13 (United States) ===
FU	F0	F1	F2	F3	F4	F5
0	2	5	5	2	1	1

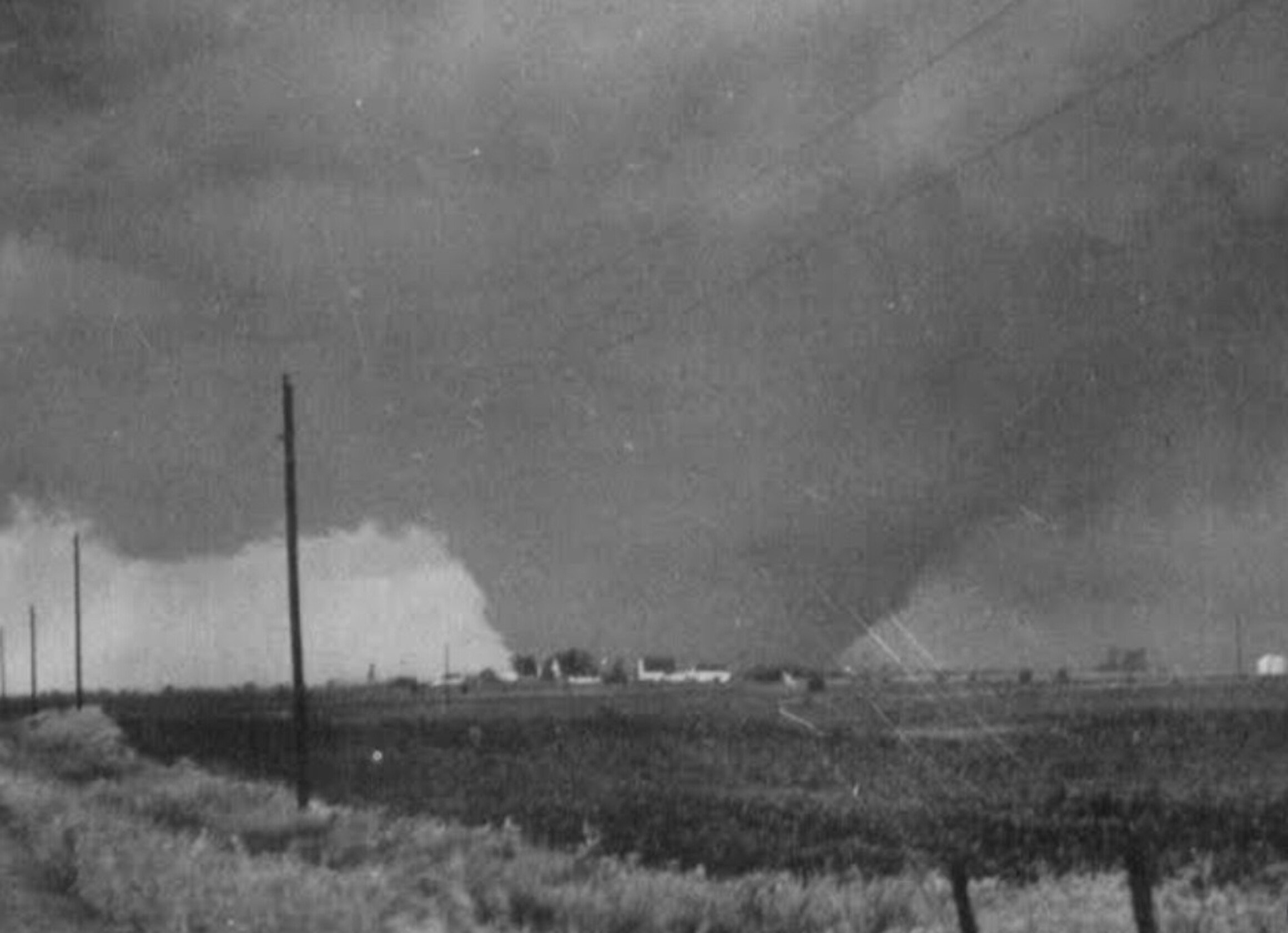
The Jordan, Iowa F5 tornado striking the small unincorporated town of Jordan

One of the largest and most violent tornadoes ever recorded in Iowa moved in between the cities of Ames and Boone during the afternoon. The tornado began southwest of the small town of Luther, Iowa a little before 3:30 pm and moved north northeast. The tornado strengthened and grew larger (at some points, more than a mile wide) as it approached US 30 just east of the intersection of IA 17. The tornado turned toward the north with the small hamlet of Jordan, Iowa in the path. A small satellite F3 tornado formed on the southwest side of the main tornado and moved around the back side and to the east of the tornado around 3:40 pm before merging back with the parent storm north of Jordan by 3:50 pm. The small hamlet of Jordan was raked by the half-mile wide F5 tornado, destroying nearly everything in its wake.

The parent tornado turned north-northwest before encountering outflow from a storm to its northwest, pushing it in an ESE direction. An anticyclonic tornado formed to the east of the parent tornado and it went to the north following the parent storm about two miles to its east. It too felt the downburst winds from the northwest and was pushed to the east as well. The parent tornado began to shrink and weaken as it approached the Boone and Story County line northwest of Ames, lifting about four miles west of Gilbert, Iowa at 4:15 pm, but the storm was not through yet.

The downburst winds that had pushed the tornado to the east were now rampaging the countryside in northern Story County around Gilbert northeastward to Story City, Iowa where more houses and farmsteads were damaged or destroyed by the strong straight line winds, although there were no deaths and only a few injuries. More than 60 homes, and over 300 farm buildings were hit and destroyed by the family of tornadoes and the downburst winds that followed.

Theodore Fujita (creator of the Fujita Scale) said the damage was most likely the most severe and extreme he had ever examined and also one of the most rare, referring to the anticyclonic F3 tornado that accompanied and mimicked the F5 tornado from the parent storm.

At same time of the supercell that produced the Jordan tornado, another supercell formed, producing an F4 wedge tornado with a width of 1,760 yards (1.00 mile) near Lemont, Illinois and causing two fatalities and 23 injuries. The outbreak as a whole killed two and injured 35. In 2026, NWS Chicago revisited this tornado and gave it a rating of EF4 with winds of 170 miles per hour in retrospect, according to this new survey the tornado only reached a width of 800 yards wide

=== June 29 ===
FU	F0	F1	F2	F3	F4	F5
0	4	1	2	0	1	0

An F4 tornado struck Alta, Illinois. There were no casualties from this or any other tornado that day.

== July ==
84 tornadoes were reported in the U.S. in July. An F3 tornado struck within the Lake Martin area on Independence Day in Alabama.

== August ==
38 tornadoes were reported in the U.S. in August.

== September ==
35 tornadoes were reported in the U.S. in September.

== October ==
11 tornadoes were reported in the U.S. in October.

== November ==
=== November 13 (Australia) ===
An estimated F3 tornado killed 2 people in Victoria, Australia.

== December ==
1 tornado was reported in the U.S. in December.

== See also ==
- Tornado
  - Tornadoes by year
  - Tornado records
  - Tornado climatology
  - Tornado myths
- List of tornado outbreaks
  - List of F5 and EF5 tornadoes
  - List of North American tornadoes and tornado outbreaks
  - List of 21st-century Canadian tornadoes and tornado outbreaks
  - List of European tornadoes and tornado outbreaks
  - List of tornadoes and tornado outbreaks in Asia
  - List of Southern Hemisphere tornadoes and tornado outbreaks
  - List of tornadoes striking downtown areas
- Tornado intensity
  - Fujita scale
  - Enhanced Fujita scale
