= Boone High School =

Public secondary school in Boone, Iowa, United States

Location
- 500 Seventh Street; Boone, Iowa 50036; United States
- 42.062°N 93.887°W

Information
- School type: Public secondary
- School district: Boone Community School District
- NCES District ID: 1905130
- Superintendent: Julie Trepa
- CEEB code: 160450
- NCES School ID: 190513000156
- Principal: Jon Johnson
- Teaching staff: 46.85 (FTE)
- Grades: 9-12
- Enrollment: 720 (2023-2024)
- Student to teacher ratio: 15.37
- Colors: Red and green
- Athletics conference: Raccoon River Conference
- Mascot: Toreador
- Website: School website

Boone High School is a public high school located in Boone, Iowa, United States. The school's mascot is the Toreadors, and their colors are red and green. It is part of the Boone Community School District.

The district, and therefore the high school attendance boundary, covers almost all of the Boone city limits. Residents of the United Community School District, which covers the remainder of the Boone city limits, Luther, and other areas, may select the Boone district for secondary schooling.

== Athletics ==
The Toreadors compete in the Raccoon River Conference in the following sports:

=== Fall sports ===
- Cross country (boys and girls)
- Swimming (girls)
- Volleyball (girls)
- Football
- Tennis (girls)
  - Girls' - 2008 Class 2A State Champions

=== Winter sports ===
- Basketball (boys and girls)
  - Boys' - 3-time State Champions (1920, 1921, 1931)
- Wrestling
  - 3-time State Champions (1923, 1924, 1925)
- Swimming (boys)

=== Spring sports ===
- Track and field (boys and girls)
- Golf (boys and girls)
  - Boys' - 2-time State Champions (1946, 1970)
- Tennis (boys)
- Soccer (boys and girls)
- Baseball
  - 2-time State Champions (1965, 1967)
- Softball

== Notable people ==
=== Alumni ===
- Pete Kostelnick, Ultramarathon runner
- Joyce Lonergan, former Iowa state legislator
- Chad Rinehart, NFL player
- Allen C. Winsor, district judge

=== Faculty ===
- Bucky O'Connor, former coach and athletic director
- Bob Vander Plaats, politician, former teacher

== See also ==
- List of high schools in Iowa
