= Jordan, Iowa =

Unincorporated community in Iowa, U.S.

- Unincorporated community
- Location within Iowa
- Coordinates: 42°02′57″N 93°47′03″W
- Country: United States
- State: Iowa
- County: Boone
- Elevation: 1,102 ft (336 m)
- Time zone: UTC-6 (Central (CST))
  - Summer (DST): UTC-5 (CDT)
- Area code: 515
- GNIS feature ID: 457993

Jordan is an unincorporated community in Boone County, Iowa, United States.

== History ==
Jordan was historically called Midway and Harmon's Switch. The present name is after the Jordan River. Jordan was not officially platted. Jordan's population was 12 in 1902, and 26 in 1925. The population was 69 in 1940.

Jordan was hit by a massive tornado on June 13, 1976. The tornado was rated an F5 by the National Weather Service, and the National Centers for Environmental Information (then called National Climatic Data Center) indicated that the damage path of the tornado was roughly 880 yards (800 m) or one-half mile (0.8 km) wide and 21 miles (34 km) long. The tornado destroyed virtually every house and business building in the community, but all residents survived. The tornado was accompanied by an F3 anticyclonic tornado two miles to the southeast. One unusual aspect of the F5 cyclonic tornado and F3 anticyclone tornado was the simultaneous right turn made by each. Dr. Ted Fujita, the originator of the Fujita tornado intensity scale, said the tornado which hit Jordan was one of the most intense and destructive he had ever studied.

== Education ==
Jordan is in the United Community School District, which operates an elementary school. United CSD sends secondary students to Ames CSD and Boone CSD.
