= Hap Moran =

American football player (1901–1994)

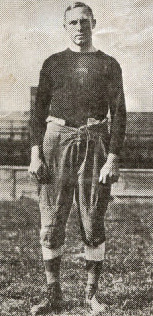
- Moran in 1926

No. 4, 21, 0, 6, 22
- Position: Tailback

Personal information
- Born: July 31, 1901; Belle Plaine, Iowa, U.S.
- Died: December 30, 1994 (aged 93); New Milford, Connecticut, U.S.
- Listed height: 6 ft 1 in (1.85 m)
- Listed weight: 190 lb (86 kg)

Career information
- High school: Boone (Boone, Iowa)
- College: Carnegie Tech (1922); Grinnell (1923–1925)

Career history
- Frankford Yellow Jackets (1926–1927); Chicago Cardinals (1927); Pottsville Maroons (1928); New York Giants (1928–1933)

Awards and highlights
- NFL champion (1926)

Career statistics
- Rushing yards: 270
- Rushing average: 3.1
- Rushing touchdowns: 13
- Receptions: 9
- Receiving yards: 161
- Receiving touchdowns: 9
- Stats at Pro Football Reference

Francis Dale "Hap" Moran (July 31, 1901 – December 30, 1994) was an American professional football halfback who played eight seasons in the National Football League (NFL), primarily with the New York Giants. He played college football for the Carnegie Tech Tartans and Grinnell Pioneers.

== Playing career ==
=== High school ===
Although he eventually made his name in football, Moran was better known in high school for basketball. He was captain of the Iowa All-State team in 1920, and his team from Boone represented Iowa at the National Interscholastic Tournament at the University of Chicago, where he was named a High School All-American by Amos Alonzo Stagg.

=== Collegiate ===
He was recruited by Carnegie Tech in Pittsburgh primarily for basketball, but also played football. In the 1922 Carnegie–Notre Dame game, the Four Horsemen first formed up as a backfield under the coaching of Knute Rockne. Moran would also play against the Four Horsemen in their last game together in 1930, when the Notre Dame All-Stars faced the New York Giants in a charity game which raised $115,000 to benefit New York City's unemployed.

In 1923, Moran returned to Iowa and played football and basketball for Grinnell College. As a passer, his favorite receiver was Morgan Taylor, who won the first gold medal for the United States in the 1924 Olympics in Paris running the 400-meter hurdles.

=== Professional ===
In 1926, Moran was hired by Frankford Yellow Jackets' coach Guy Chamberlin, and his first professional game was against the Akron Pros, led by Fritz Pollard, the All-American from Brown University, one of the few black players in the NFL. Moran scored Frankford's only points of the game and earned a starting spot as halfback. Frankford won the NFL Championship that season, and Moran was their second-highest scorer.

Moran played the first part of the 1927 season with the Yellow Jackets and was then recruited by the Chicago Cardinals, primarily for his kicking skills. He was ranked second in the league for field goals and ninth for points after touchdowns that year. In 1928, he played in the backfield for the Pottsville Maroons with Johnny Blood. After the New York Giants' lineman Steve Owen knocked himself unconscious trying to tackle Moran, the Giants invited him to join their team for the last game of the 1928 season. Moran stayed with the Giants for the next five seasons.

In the course of his career Moran started at halfback, tailback, wingback, quarterback, blocking back, defensive back and linebacker.

In 1931, he was the Giants' scoring leader.

When he retired from the NFL in 1933, he held the league records for the longest run from scrimmage (91 yards against the Packers on November 23, 1930) and most receiving yards in a single game with 114 yards against the Eagles on October 15, 1933. His 91-yard run remained a Giants record for 75 years until it was broken by Tiki Barber on December 31, 2005.

== After NFL ==
After retiring from the NFL, he played for the Paterson Panthers of the American Association, and coached the Panthers in 1936. After his football career, he was a buyer for Western Electric, living in Sunnyside, Queens, New York and coaching a youth football team there.
