= Worth Township, Boone County, Iowa =

Township in Iowa, US

Worth Township, Boone County
- Township
- Coordinates: 41°59′50″N 093°51′51″W
- Country: United States
- State: Iowa
- County: Boone

Area
  - Total: 27.24 sq mi (70.54 km^{2})
  - Land: 27.05 sq mi (70.05 km^{2})
  - Water: 0.19 sq mi (0.49 km^{2})
- Elevation: 1,079 ft (329 m)

Population (2000)
  - Total: 655
  - Density: 24/sq mi (9.4/km^{2})
- FIPS code: 19-94782
- GNIS feature ID: 0469017

Worth Township is one of seventeen townships in Boone County, Iowa, United States. As of the 2000 census, its population was 655.

== History ==
Worth Township was organized in 1858. It is named for William J. Worth.

== Geography ==
Worth Township covers an area of 27.23 square miles (70.5 km^{2}) and contains one incorporated settlement, Luther. According to the USGS, it contains four cemeteries: Hull, James Gildea, Sarah Dinwoodie and Squire Boone.
