= Chad Rinehart =

American football player (born 1985)

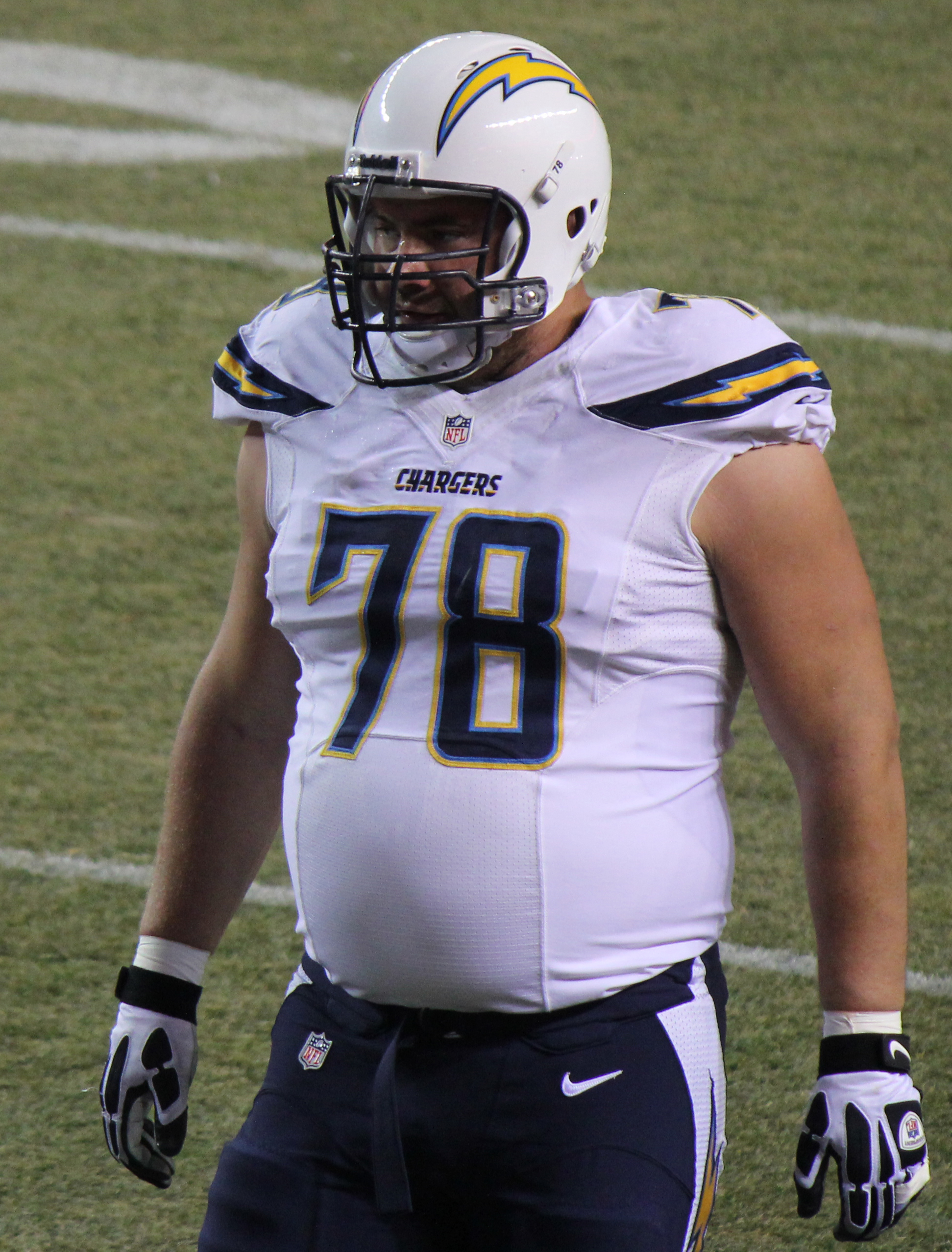
- Rinehart with the San Diego Chargers in 2013

No. 75, 76, 78
- Position: Guard

Personal information
- Born: May 4, 1985 (age 41); Boone, Iowa, U.S.
- Listed height: 6 ft 5 in (1.96 m)
- Listed weight: 320 lb (145 kg)

Career information
- High school: Boone
- College: Northern Iowa
- NFL draft: 2008: 3rd round, 96th overall pick

Career history
- Washington Redskins (2008–2009); New York Jets (2010)*; Buffalo Bills (2010–2012); San Diego Chargers (2013–2014)
- * Offseason or practice squad member only

Awards and highlights
- First-team All-American (2007); Second-team All-American (2006); 3× First-team All-Gateway (2005–2007)

Career NFL statistics
- Games played: 58
- Games started: 47
- Stats at Pro Football Reference

Chad Rinehart (born May 4, 1985) is an American former professional football player who was guard in the National Football League (NFL). He played college football for the Northern Iowa Panthers and was selected by the Washington Redskins in the third round with the 96th overall pick in the 2008 NFL draft. Rinehart has been a member of the New York Jets, Buffalo Bills, and San Diego Chargers.

== Early life ==
Rinehart played high school football at Boone High School in Boone, Iowa, where he also played the cello in the school orchestra.

== College career ==
Rinehart played college football for the Northern Iowa Panthers.

== Professional career ==
=== Washington Redskins ===
The Washington Redskins drafted Rinehart in the third round, 96th overall, of the 2008 NFL draft. Rinehart signed a four-year contract with the team on July 10, 2008.

He suffered a broken fibula after being rolled up on by Anthony Spencer against the Dallas Cowboys on November 22, 2009. Rinehart returned from the injury and began to improve however the Redskins decided to part ways with the veteran on September 4, 2010, during the final round of roster cuts prior to the start of the season.

=== New York Jets ===
On September 29, 2010, the New York Jets signed Rinehart to their practice squad following the promotion of wide receiver Patrick Turner. Rinehart was released from New York's practice squad on October 13, 2010.

=== Buffalo Bills ===
On October 18, 2010, the Buffalo Bills signed Rinehart to their practice squad. Rinehart was promoted to the active roster on December 7, 2010 after Kraig Urbik suffered a season-ending knee injury. Rinehart played at guard in 2011 and also filled in at center. He was tendered in April 2012.

=== San Diego Chargers ===
On March 13, 2013, Rinehart signed with the San Diego Chargers. The Chargers re-signed him to a two-year, $6 million contract on March 10, 2014. On March 10, 2015, Rinehart was released.

== Arrest ==
On January 20, 2010 at 2:00 A.M., Rinehart was arrested on public intoxication charges in Cedar Falls, Iowa after he pulled on a locked door at Mojo's Pizza House, thus triggering an alarm, and refused to take a breath test. Rinehart was later released from jail via court order. Rinehart was found guilty of the charge in June 2010 and was ordered to pay a $195 fine.
