= 1976 Brownwood tornado =

F5 tornado in Texas

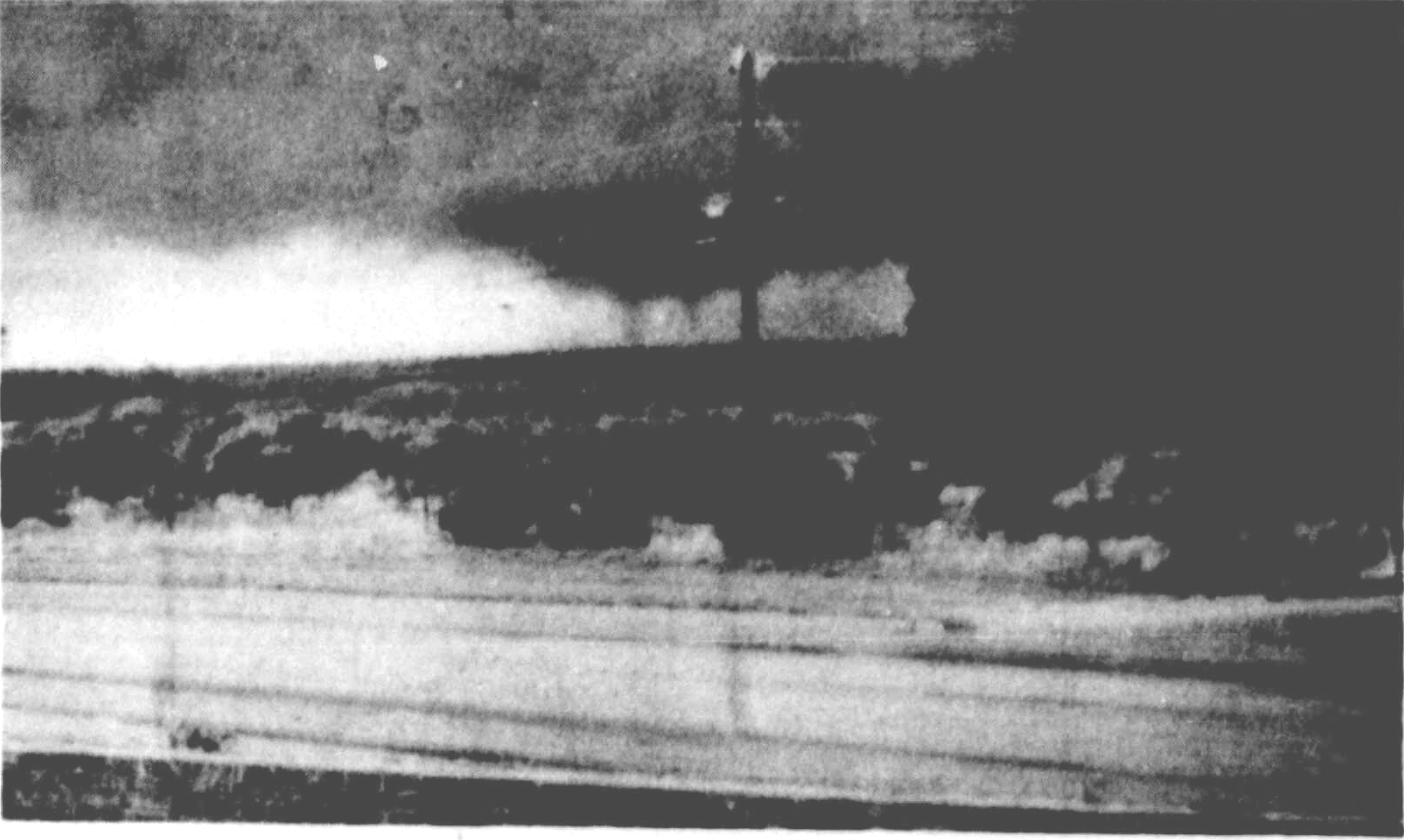
- A Polaroid photograph of the tornado

Meteorological history
- Formed: April 19, 1976, 5:30 p.m. CST (UTC−06:00)
- Dissipated: April 19, 1976, 5:50 p.m. CST (UTC−06:00)
- Duration: 20 minutes

F5 tornado
- on the Fujita scale
- Highest winds: >261 mph (420 km/h)

Overall effects
- Fatalities: 0
- Injuries: 11
- Damage: $2.5–$5 million (1976 USD)
- Areas affected: Around Brownwood, Texas
- Part of the tornado outbreaks of 1976

During the evening hours of April 19, 1976, a violent tornado struck Brownwood, Texas, United States. The damage caused by the tornado was extreme enough for the National Weather Service to rate the tornado F5 on the Fujita scale. In 1993, meteorologist Thomas P. Grazulis disagreed with the National Weather Service's assessment of the tornado, which he assigned a maximum rating of F4 on the Fujita scale.

== Tornado summary ==
The tornado touched down near Highway 67 between Bangs and Brownwood. About 4 miles (6.4 km) northwest of Brownwood, the tornado crossed Highway 279, where several outbuildings, a motorcycle racetrack and a parked car were destroyed. As the tornado continued northeastward, it crossed a small hill, where the National Weather Service documented that it "shredded" mesquite trees.

The tornado then crossed FM 2125 approximately 5 miles (8.0 km) north of downtown Brownwood, where it struck the A.I. Fabis pecan orchard and farm. On the farm, 11 people were injured as four homes were leveled and several outbuildings were completely destroyed. Two teenagers on the farm were caught in the open and were thrown 1,000 yards (910 m). The National Weather Service reported that both survived. Meteorologist T. Eric Brown reported they were “seriously injured”. A.I. Fabis, the owner of the farm, "narrowly escaped death when the storm blew his frame house away". The National Weather Service documented that Fabis hid in his bathtub during the storm, which was the only thing still attached to the foundation after the tornado swept away the rest of the house.

After destroying Fabis' farm, the tornado devastated the Brownwood Airport. A set of T-hangars and six privately owned aircraft were destroyed. The tornado miraculously arced around a larger hangar, where several of the airport workers were sheltering during the tornado. The tornado lifted 0.5 miles (0.80 km) northeast of Highway 183 after traveling 10.5 miles (16.9 km). In total, the tornado, which reached a peak width of 0.25 miles (0.40 km), injured 11 people and caused between $2.5 and $5 million (1976 USD) in damage.

== See also ==
- Tornadoes of 1976
- List of F5 and EF5 tornadoes
