= Joyce Lonergan =

American politician

Member of the Iowa House of Representatives from the 87th district
- In office January 10, 1983 – January 11, 1987
- Preceded by: William R. Sullivan
- Succeeded by: Teresa Garman

Member of the Iowa House of Representatives from the 44th district
- In office January 13, 1975 – January 9, 1983
- Preceded by: C. Raymond Fisher
- Succeeded by: Andy McKean

Personal details
- Born: March 5, 1934 Belle Plaine, Iowa
- Died: January 17, 2006 (aged 71) Ames, Iowa
- Party: Democratic

Joyce Lonergan (March 5, 1934 – January 17, 2006) was an American politician who served in the Iowa House of Representatives from 1975 to 1987.

Born in Benton County, Lonergan graduated from Boone High School and attended Boone Junior College.
