= Boone County Historical Center =

- Champlin Memorial Masonic Temple
- U.S. National Register of Historic Places
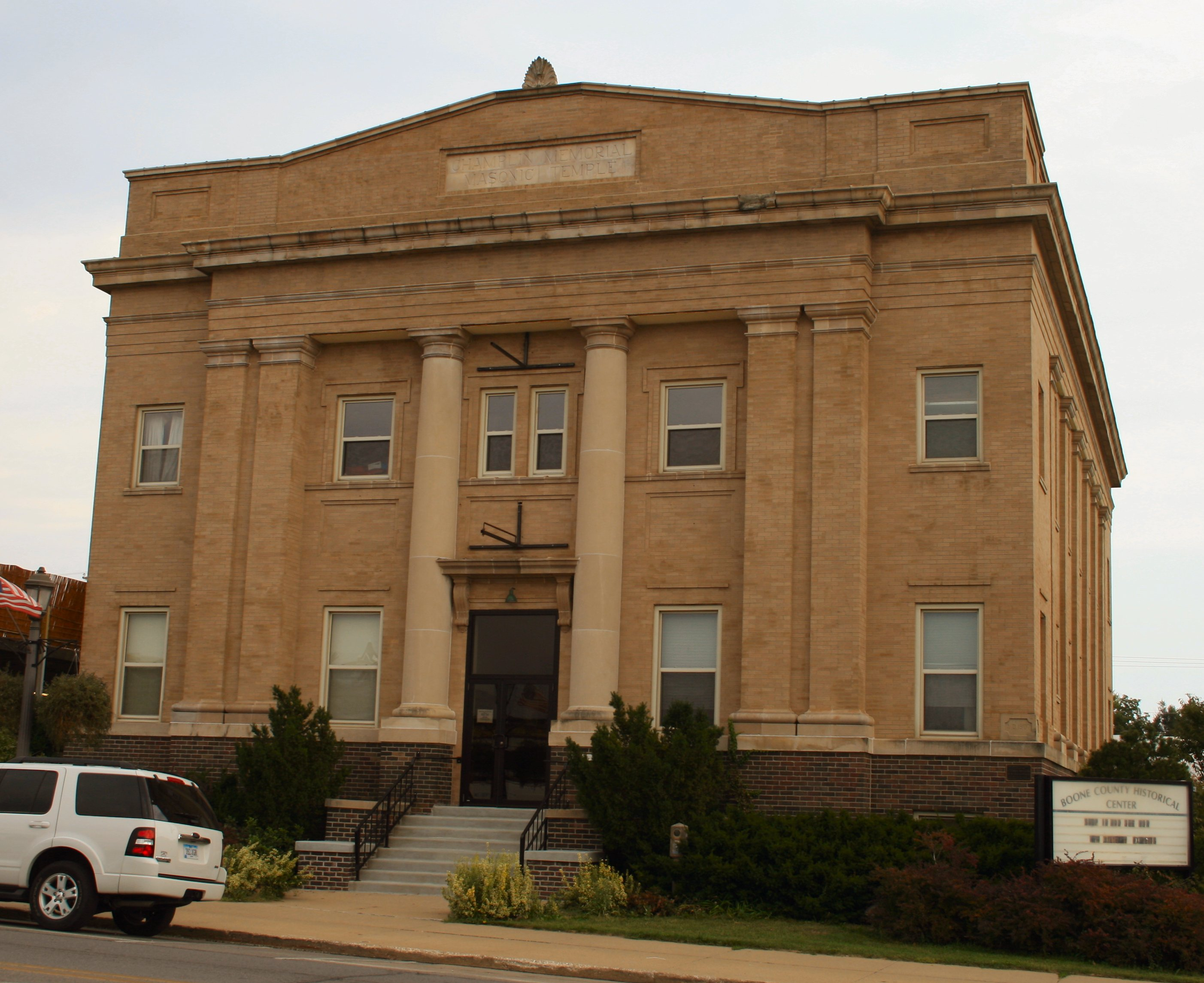

- Location within Iowa Location within the United States
- Location: 602 Story St., Boone, Iowa
- Coordinates: 42°3′44″N 93°52′45″W
- Area: less than one acre
- Built: 1907
- Architect: Proudfoot & Bird
- Architectural style: Chicago, Commercial Style
- MPS: Architectural Legacy of Proudfoot & Bird in Iowa MPS
- NRHP reference No.: 90001853
- Added to NRHP: December 20, 1990

The Boone History Center, previously known as the Champlin Memorial Masonic Temple, is a historic building in Boone, Iowa. Constructed in 1907 as the Champlin Memorial Masonic Temple, the building housed Mt. Olive Lodge No. 79 (a local chapter of the Freemasons) until 1990 (when the lodge moved to a new building). It now houses the Boone County Historical Society.

It was listed on the National Register of Historic Places in 1990.
