= Diebler =

Diebler is a surname. Notable people with the surname include:

- Jake Diebler (born 1986), American basketball coach and former player
- Jon Diebler (born 1988), American former professional basketball player

== See also ==
- Deibler
