= Boone, Iowa =

Boone
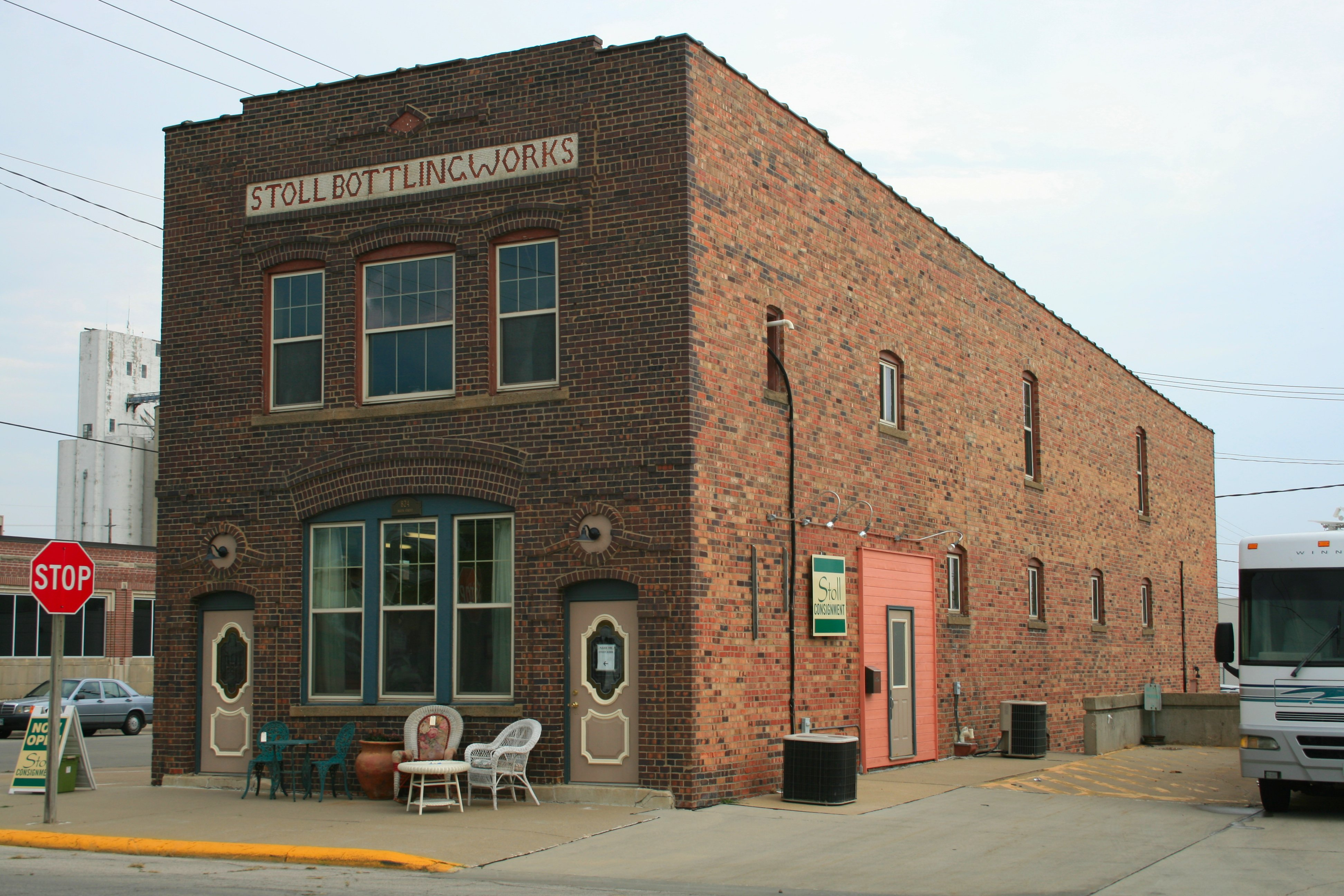
- Stoll Bottling Works Building in Boone

- Location of Boone, Iowa
- Coordinates: 42°03′05″N 93°52′12″W
- Country: United States
- State: Iowa
- County: Boone
- Township: Des Moines
- Incorporated: 1849

Area
  - Total: 9.08 sq mi (23.53 km^{2})
  - Land: 9.08 sq mi (23.53 km^{2})
  - Water: 0 sq mi (0.00 km^{2})
- Elevation: 1,142 ft (348 m)

Population (2020)
  - Total: 12,460
  - Density: 1,371.6/sq mi (529.57/km^{2})
- Time zone: UTC-6 (Central (CST))
  - Summer (DST): UTC-5 (CDT)
- ZIP codes: 50036-50037
- Area code: 515
- FIPS code: 19-07480
- GNIS feature ID: 2394220
- Website: www.boonegov.com

Boone (/ˈbuːn/ BOON) is a city in Des Moines Township and the county seat of Boone County, Iowa, United States.

It is the principal city of the Boone, Iowa Micropolitan Statistical Area, which encompasses all of Boone County. This micropolitan statistical area, along with the Ames, Iowa Metropolitan Statistical Area comprise the larger Ames-Boone, Iowa Combined Statistical Area. The population of the city was reported as 12,460 at the 2020 census.

== History ==
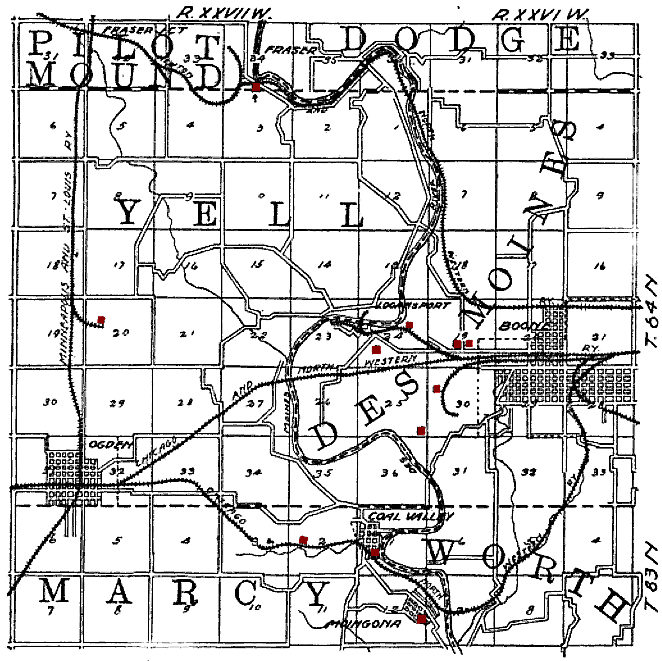
Map of the Boone area from 1908, showing the railroads and coal mines (shown in red) of the region.

Coal mining played an important part in the early history of the Boone area. Local blacksmiths were already mining coal from the banks of Honey Creek south of what became Boone in 1849.

Boone was platted as a town in 1865 by John Insley Blair. It was incorporated the following year, when the Chicago and North Western Transportation Company railroad station was built there. The town was originally named "Montana"; it was renamed to Boone in 1871. The nearby town of Boonesboro was also chartered in 1866; Boonesboro was annexed to Boone in 1887. The present name is a tribute to Nathan Boone, son of explorer Daniel Boone.

Commercial mining was spurred by the arrival of the railroad. In 1867, Canfield and Taylor opened a mine just west of town. Their mine shaft was 242 feet deep, and they hauled coal to the railroad by wagon. In 1874, a railroad spur was built to the mine. This mine was taken over by the railroad, and operated for 30 years. There were coal seams in the Boone area; the upper vein, about 3 feet thick, was always worked using longwall mining, while the lower vein was always mined using room and pillar mining. In 1912, United Mine Workers Local 869 in Boone had 554 members, close to 10% of the population at the time.

The grocery chain Fareway originated in Boone. The company maintains their business offices in town also.

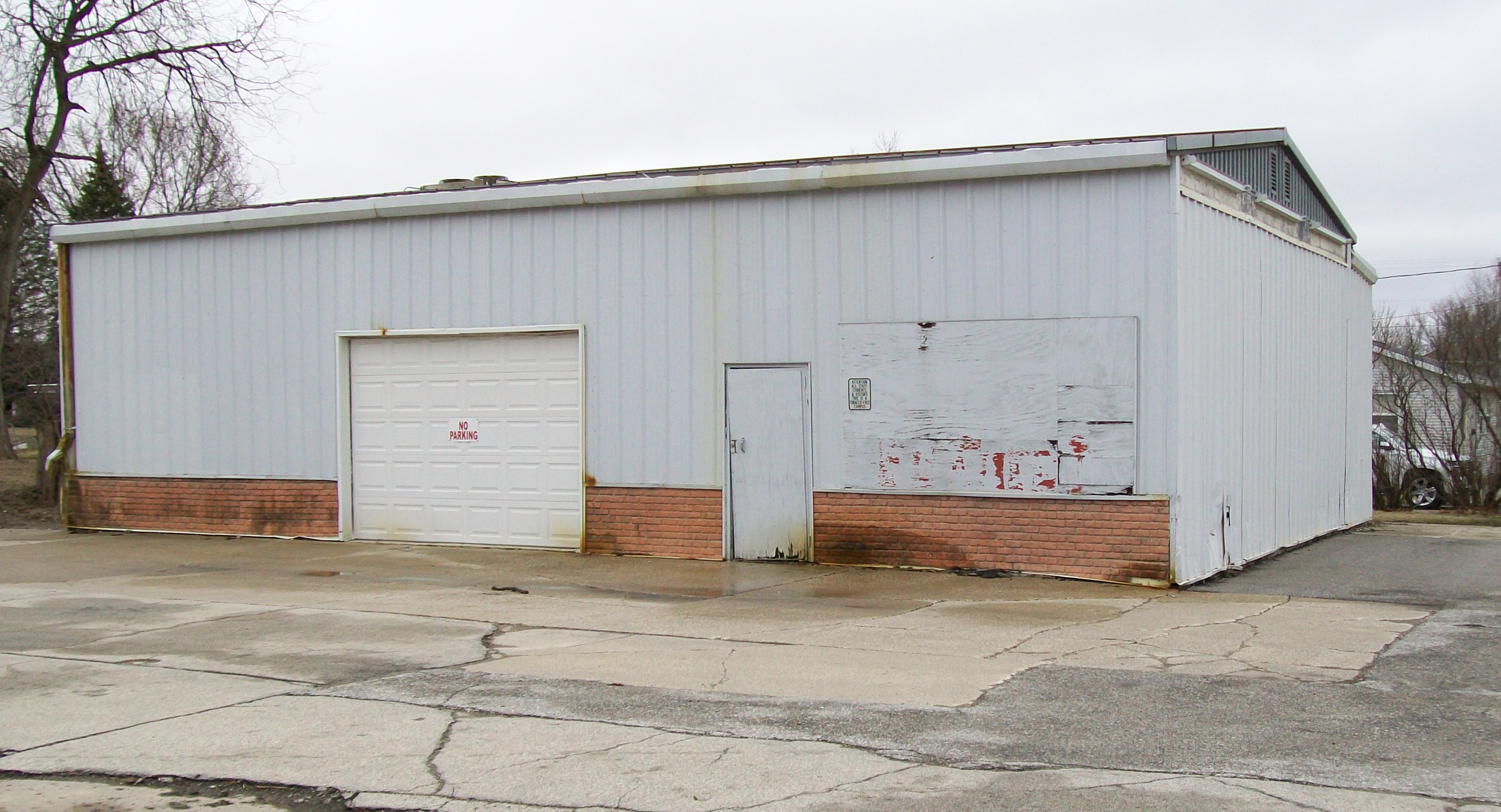
Original Casey's store in Boone, IA as it looked in March 2022

The first Casey's General Store was founded in Boone, Iowa in 1968.

Other larger businesses that have had or still maintain facilities in Boone include Gates Rubber, Heinrich Envelope, Archway Bakery, Lowe-Berry Seeds, Coca-Cola Bottling, Quinn Iron & Wire Works (now Besser Quinn Machine & Foundry), Mid-States Steel, Sunoco Products, Specialty Leather Productions, Randy's Frozen Meats, PDM Distribution, ProLiant Biologicals, APC, Thermomass Composite Tech, CDS Global, Patterson Logistics and Stoll Bottling.

== Geography ==
According to the United States Census Bureau, the city has a total area of 9.02 square miles (23.36 km^{2}), all land.

Ledges State Park is located four miles south of Boone and is a popular destination.

=== Climate ===
According to the Köppen Climate Classification system, Boone has a hot-summer humid continental climate, abbreviated "Dfa" on climate maps.

Climate data for Boone, Iowa, 1991–2020 normals, extremes 1904–present
| Month | Jan | Feb | Mar | Apr | May | Jun | Jul | Aug | Sep | Oct | Nov | Dec | Year |
|---|---|---|---|---|---|---|---|---|---|---|---|---|---|
| Record high °F (°C) | 68 (20) | 77 (25) | 88 (31) | 95 (35) | 110 (43) | 106 (41) | 111 (44) | 111 (44) | 103 (39) | 95 (35) | 82 (28) | 72 (22) | 111 (44) |
| Mean maximum °F (°C) | 50.8 (10.4) | 55.6 (13.1) | 72.0 (22.2) | 82.8 (28.2) | 88.6 (31.4) | 92.4 (33.6) | 94.2 (34.6) | 92.8 (33.8) | 90.1 (32.3) | 84.0 (28.9) | 69.1 (20.6) | 54.9 (12.7) | 95.9 (35.5) |
| Mean daily maximum °F (°C) | 28.2 (−2.1) | 33.3 (0.7) | 46.3 (7.9) | 60.0 (15.6) | 71.0 (21.7) | 80.7 (27.1) | 84.2 (29.0) | 82.2 (27.9) | 76.1 (24.5) | 63.2 (17.3) | 46.9 (8.3) | 33.8 (1.0) | 58.8 (14.9) |
| Daily mean °F (°C) | 18.7 (−7.4) | 23.3 (−4.8) | 35.9 (2.2) | 48.4 (9.1) | 59.7 (15.4) | 69.6 (20.9) | 73.5 (23.1) | 71.5 (21.9) | 63.9 (17.7) | 51.0 (10.6) | 36.8 (2.7) | 24.8 (−4.0) | 48.1 (9.0) |
| Mean daily minimum °F (°C) | 9.1 (−12.7) | 13.3 (−10.4) | 25.6 (−3.6) | 36.7 (2.6) | 48.5 (9.2) | 58.6 (14.8) | 62.7 (17.1) | 60.8 (16.0) | 51.7 (10.9) | 38.8 (3.8) | 26.8 (−2.9) | 15.8 (−9.0) | 37.4 (3.0) |
| Mean minimum °F (°C) | −13.7 (−25.4) | −8.5 (−22.5) | 4.1 (−15.5) | 21.2 (−6.0) | 33.4 (0.8) | 45.0 (7.2) | 51.8 (11.0) | 50.7 (10.4) | 36.4 (2.4) | 23.6 (−4.7) | 9.9 (−12.3) | −5.2 (−20.7) | −17.6 (−27.6) |
| Record low °F (°C) | −35 (−37) | −35 (−37) | −22 (−30) | −1 (−18) | 21 (−6) | 35 (2) | 40 (4) | 35 (2) | 23 (−5) | −6 (−21) | −11 (−24) | −25 (−32) | −35 (−37) |
| Average precipitation inches (mm) | 1.20 (30) | 1.41 (36) | 2.26 (57) | 4.06 (103) | 5.17 (131) | 5.38 (137) | 4.80 (122) | 4.92 (125) | 3.32 (84) | 2.97 (75) | 2.08 (53) | 1.57 (40) | 39.14 (993) |
| Average snowfall inches (cm) | 9.9 (25) | 9.3 (24) | 5.0 (13) | 1.3 (3.3) | 0.0 (0.0) | 0.0 (0.0) | 0.0 (0.0) | 0.0 (0.0) | 0.0 (0.0) | 0.6 (1.5) | 1.9 (4.8) | 7.9 (20) | 35.9 (91.6) |
| Average precipitation days (≥ 0.01 in) | 8.9 | 8.5 | 9.5 | 12.5 | 14.4 | 12.8 | 10.4 | 10.9 | 9.2 | 9.4 | 7.7 | 8.8 | 123 |
| Average snowy days (≥ 0.1 in) | 6.1 | 5.8 | 2.8 | 1.0 | 0.0 | 0.0 | 0.0 | 0.0 | 0.0 | 0.3 | 1.4 | 5.2 | 22.6 |
Source 1: NOAA
Source 2: National Weather Service

== Demographics ==
Historical population
| Census | Pop. | Note | %± |
|---|---|---|---|
| 1880 | 3,330 | | — |
| 1890 | 6,520 | | 95.8% |
| 1900 | 8,880 | | 36.2% |
| 1910 | 10,347 | | 16.5% |
| 1920 | 12,451 | | 20.3% |
| 1930 | 11,886 | | −4.5% |
| 1940 | 12,373 | | 4.1% |
| 1950 | 12,164 | | −1.7% |
| 1960 | 12,468 | | 2.5% |
| 1970 | 12,468 | | 0.0% |
| 1980 | 12,602 | | 1.1% |
| 1990 | 12,392 | | −1.7% |
| 2000 | 12,803 | | 3.3% |
| 2010 | 12,661 | | −1.1% |
| 2020 | 12,460 | | −1.6% |
U.S. Decennial Census

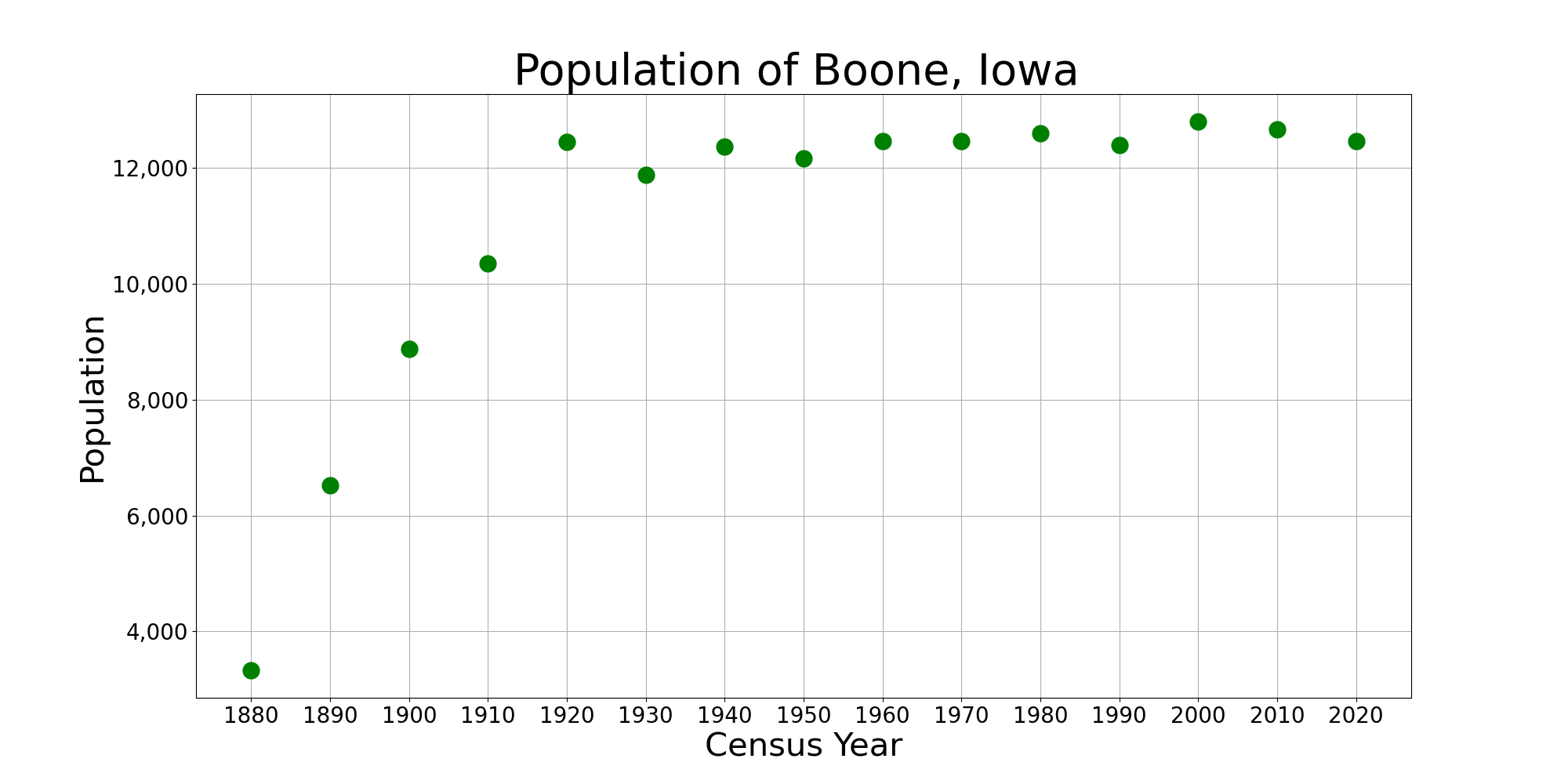
The population of Boone, Iowa from US census data

=== 2020 census ===
As of the 2020 census, Boone had a population of 12,460 and 3,228 families. The population density was 1,371.6 inhabitants per square mile (529.6/km^{2}).

The median age was 41.2 years. 22.0% of residents were under the age of 18 and 20.2% were 65 years of age or older. 24.0% of residents were under the age of 20; 5.1% were between the ages of 20 and 24; 25.4% were from 25 to 44; and 25.3% were from 45 to 64. For every 100 females there were 94.5 males, and for every 100 females age 18 and over there were 92.4 males age 18 and over. The gender makeup of the city was 48.6% male and 51.4% female.

There were 5,410 households, of which 26.9% had children under the age of 18 living in them. Of all households, 44.8% were married-couple households, 7.1% were cohabitating couple households, 20.2% were households with a male householder and no spouse or partner present, and 27.9% were households with a female householder and no spouse or partner present. About 40.3% of all households were non-families, 34.1% were made up of individuals, and 14.6% had someone living alone who was 65 years of age or older.

There were 5,935 housing units at an average density of 653.3 per square mile (252.2/km^{2}), of which 8.8% were vacant. The homeowner vacancy rate was 2.1% and the rental vacancy rate was 11.5%.

98.4% of residents lived in urban areas, while 1.6% lived in rural areas.

Racial composition as of the 2020 census
| Race | Number | Percent |
|---|---|---|
| White | 11,562 | 92.8% |
| Black or African American | 153 | 1.2% |
| American Indian and Alaska Native | 36 | 0.3% |
| Asian | 69 | 0.6% |
| Native Hawaiian and Other Pacific Islander | 2 | 0.0% |
| Some other race | 110 | 0.9% |
| Two or more races | 528 | 4.2% |
| Hispanic or Latino (of any race) | 329 | 2.6% |

=== 2010 census ===
At the 2010 census, there were 12,661 people, 5,380 households and 3,278 families living in the city. The population density was 1,403.7 inhabitants per square mile (542.0/km^{2}). There were 5,917 housing units at an average density of 656.0 units per square mile (253.3 units/km^{2}). The racial makeup of the city was 96.7% White, 0.8% African American, 0.3% Native American, 0.4% Asian, 0.5% from other races, and 1.3% from two or more races. Hispanic or Latino of any race were 2.0% of the population.

There were 5,380 households, of which 29.4% had children under the age of 18 living with them, 47.3% were married couples living together, 9.7% had a female householder with no husband present, 3.9% had a male householder with no wife present, and 39.1% were non-families. 32.1% of all households were made up of individuals, and 12.5% had someone living alone who was 65 years of age or older. The average household size was 2.32 and the average family size was 2.92.

The median age was 38.1 years. 23.5% of residents were under the age of 18; 9.3% were between the ages of 18 and 24; 25% were from 25 to 44; 26.1% were from 45 to 64; and 16.2% were 65 years of age or older. The gender makeup of the city was 48.9% male and 51.1% female.

=== 2000 census ===
At the 2000 census, there were 12,803 people, 5,313 households and 3,363 families living in the city. The population density was 1,433.9 inhabitants per square mile (553.6/km^{2}). There were 5,585 housing units at an average density of 625.5 units per square mile (241.5 units/km^{2}). The racial makeup of the city was 98.34% White, 0.32% African American, 0.22% Native American, 0.21% Asian, 0.35% from other races, and 0.56% from two or more races. Hispanic or Latino of any race were 0.87% of the population.

There were 5,313 households, of which 30.2% had children under the age of 18 living with them, 51.0% were married couples living together, 9.8% had a female householder with no husband present, and 36.7% were non-families. 31.5% of all households were made up of individuals, and 13.8% had someone living alone who was 65 years of age or older. The average household size was 2.34 and the average family size was 2.94.

24.3% of the population were under the age of 18, 9.5% from 18 to 24, 27.2% from 25 to 44, 21.4% from 45 to 64, and 17.6% who were 65 years of age or older. The median age was 38 years. For every 100 females, there were 89.3 males. For every 100 females age 18 and over, there were 85.4 males.

The median household income was $43,256. Males had a median income of $32,106 and females $22,119. The per capita income was $22,611. About 5.4% of families and 8.4% of the population were below the poverty line, including 10.9% of those under age 18 and 5.8% of those age 65 or over.

== Transportation ==
Boone is located on U.S. Route 30. The original Lincoln Highway ran through the center of town, but a new four-lane highway was built in the late 1960s that bypassed the center of Boone to the south. There is also a network of paved country roads radiating out in all directions.

Boone is served by the mainline of the Union Pacific, which purchased the Chicago & North Western Railroad (C&NW) in 1995. Boone was a division and crew change point on the railroad under the Chicago & North Western and some of that business remains today. There is a moderate-sized rail yard to the east of the downtown area. The locomotives no longer sound their horns in the town proper due to modifications to the various points where streets intersect with the rail line.

Boone was also the exact midpoint on the Fort Dodge, Des Moines & Southern Railroad, an electric interurban line converted to diesel in 1955 after a flood on the Des Moines River devastated the Fraser hydroelectric power plant that supplied power to the railroad. It connected with the C&NW downtown. It was purchased by the C&NW in 1968 and subsequently abandoned. The western part of the line to Fraser has been resurrected as the Boone and Scenic Valley Railroad, a tourist line.

The Chicago, Milwaukee, St. Paul and Pacific Railroad also ran a branch line into Boone from the southeast. It likewise connected with the C&NW. The line was trimmed back to Luther in the late 1960s and completely abandoned a few years later.

== Economy ==
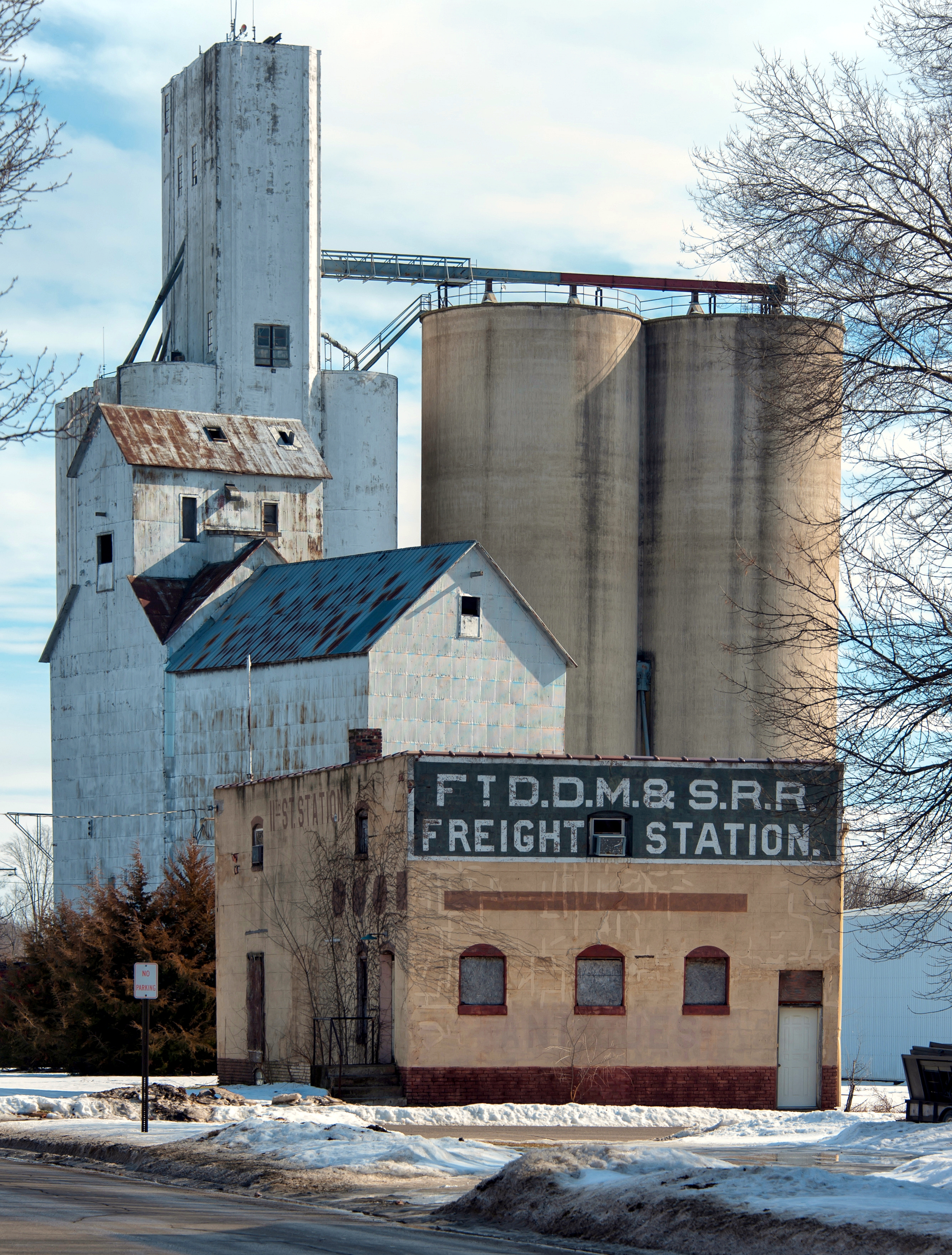
Former freight station and grain elevator in Boone

- Unemployment rate

3.6% (6.0% USA)

- Recent job growth

-5.8%

- Future job growth

21.1% (33.5% USA)

- Sales taxes

7.00% (7.30% USA)

- Income per capita

$32,273 ($37,638 USA)

- Median Household income

$61,997 ($69,021 USA)

== Education ==
The Boone Community School District, which operates public schools, covers almost all of the Boone city limits. Boone High School is the comprehensive high school of that district. A small piece of the city limits is within the United Community School District, which operates an elementary school. United CSD sends secondary students to Boone CSD and Ames CSD.

The Sacred Heart parish operates a parochial school for kindergarten through 8th grade. Trinity Lutheran Church operates a school for students 3 years old to 8th grade. The Des Moines Area Community College (DMACC) has a campus in the south central part of the town. It was established when DMACC purchased the former Boone Junior College in 1969 and was the second campus added during the initial period of expansion.

== Arts and culture ==
=== Festivals and events ===
Pufferbilly Days, an annual event celebrating Boone's railroad heritage, is held at the end of the summer and is one of Iowa's top five community festivals with over 30,000 attendees.

The IMCA Super Nationals are held at the Boone Speedway, occurring during the week of Labor Day in September.

Boone is also a site of the annual Farm Progress Show. Originally the show rotated from one farm to another in Iowa, Illinois and Indiana before the permanent sites were established at Boone, Iowa and Decatur, Illinois. The show now alternates between these two permanent sites on an annual basis.

=== Tourist attractions ===
Vincenzo Miserendino's final and largest statue of Theodore Roosevelt, which was eight times life-size was commissioned in 1941, and was scheduled to arrive in Boone, Iowa, in 1943. However, before casting, its 4,000 pounds of bronze was appropriated for World War II. Miserendino commented that Theodore Roosevelt himself would have approved of that decision to put the service of the country first. Later, in 1946, the Roman Bronze Corporation of Corona, New York City, produced the casting in Miserendino's original mold. (Note: Miserendino died in 1943 before the 1946 casting of Roosevelt.) On January 6, 1948, it was placed in McHose Park. (Note: James Buritt McHose was an admirer of Theodore Roosevelt. On July 25, 1924, McHose and his wife, Ella, gave nearly 200 acres of land on the southwest side of Boone to the city for a park which is named in their honor. When McHose died in June of 1927 at the age of 78, shortly after the park's dedication, his last will and testament specified that a statue of Roosevelt be placed in the park. John W. Jordan, the attorney for McHose's will, oversaw the Roosevelt statue project for the park.) Residing on three large granite blocks, the 6' 3" statue depicts Roosevelt rising out of a mountainous landscape with his hand outstretched as if addressing a crowd. Below the statue are ten bas reliefs of Roosevelt's outdoor accomplishments.

Boone & Scenic Valley Railroad & the James H. Andrew Railroad Museum are other points of interest. The B&SVRR allows visitors to view Boone and the Des Moines river valley area via train, riding behind various historic train equipment. Thomas the Tank Engine makes annual visits to B&SVRR, at the Day Out with Thomas event, usually in September. The railroad also hosts several "dinner" trains, a regular weekly train excursion as well as a special Christmas themed event. The James H. Andrew museum, located on site, highlights railroad history with a variety of exhibits and authentic railroad related artifacts.

Boone County Historical Center, a museum housed in the former Champlin Memorial Masonic Temple.

== Parks and recreation ==
J.B. McHose Park and Shelter is the largest park in Boone, and features shelters, baseball fields, tennis courts, a sand volleyball area, a basketball court, playgrounds, nature trails, an equestrian trail, fishing pond, Teddy Roosevelt monument, bike trail, disc golf course, and a swimming pool.

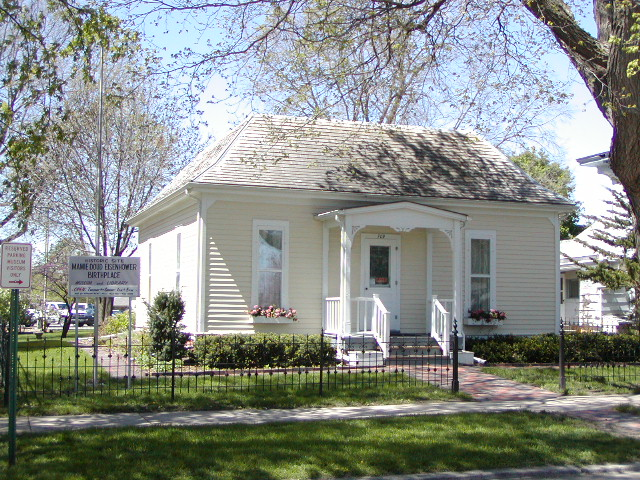
Birthplace of First Lady Mamie Doud Eisenhower, 709 (formerly 718) Carroll Street, Boone, Iowa

== Notable people ==
- Mamie Geneva Doud, First Lady of the United States, wife of President Dwight D. Eisenhower, was born here.
- Norman Arthur Erbe, Republican Governor of Iowa from 1961 to 1963; born and resided in Boone.
- Kate Stevens Harpel (1867-1950), teacher, school board member, physician
- Jerry McNertney, MLB player for Seattle Pilots/Milwaukee Brewers, St. Louis Cardinals, and Pittsburgh Pirates
- Hap Moran, All-American basketball player from Boone High School and New York Giants football star
- Chad Rinehart, offensive lineman for San Diego Chargers and All-American for University of Northern Iowa
- Darlene Rose, missionary in Papua New Guinea during and after World War II, survived imprisonment in Japanese War Camp
- Ed Updegraff, golfer, U.S. Senior Amateur and Walker Cup champion; also a physician
- Curtis D. Wilbur, lawyer, judge and 43rd United States Secretary of the Navy
- Ray Lyman Wilbur, third president of Stanford University, also United States Secretary of the Interior; born in Boone
