= Boone Community School District =

Public school district in Boone, Iowa, United States

Coordinates: 42.062386°N 93.887135°W

Location
- Boone, Iowa Boone County United States
- Coordinates: 42.062386, -93.887135

District information
- Type: Local school district
- Grades: K-12
- Superintendent: Julie Trepa
- Schools: 5
- Budget: $34,647,000 (2020-21)
- NCES District ID: 1905130

Students and staff
- Students: 2019 (2022-23)
- Teachers: 137.22 FTE
- Staff: 172.73 FTE
- Student–teacher ratio: 14.71
- Athletic conference: Raccoon River
- District mascot: Toreador
- Colors: Red and Green

Other information
- Website: www.boonecsd.org

The Boone Community School District is a public school district headquartered in Boone, Iowa.

The district, entirely within Boone County, serves almost all of the Boone city limits and the surrounding rural areas. Residents of the United Community School District, which covers the remainder of the Boone city limits, Luther, and other areas, may select the Boone district for secondary schooling.

== History ==
Julie Trepa became superintendent in 2020, after serving as a shared superintendent at West Monona and West Harrison schools districts.

In 2021, voters passed a referendum that allowed the district to build a new elementary school.

== Schools ==
The district operates four schools, all in Boone:

- Boone High School
- Boone Middle School
- Franklin Elementary School
- Ledges Elementary School - The namesake is Ledges State Park. It was scheduled to open in fall 2023 and took students from Lincoln and Page elementaries.

=== Former schools ===
- Lincoln Elementary School (closed, replaced by Ledges ES)
- Page Elementary School (closed, replaced by Ledges ES)

== See also ==
- List of school districts in Iowa
