= Ames Community School District =

Public school district in Ames, Iowa, United States

Address
- 2005 24th Street Ames, Iowa; United States

District information
- Motto: Mission Statement: "The Ames School District commits to equity and access that empowers every individual to reach their full personal and educational potential."
- Grades: K–12
- Established: The Hoggatt School first schoolhouse in the vicinity was built in 1862 to serve area residents before the city of Ames was established.
- President: Dr. Kelly Winfrey
- Superintendent: Dr. Julious Lawson
- Accreditations: North Central Association of Secondary Schools and Colleges, Iowa Department of Education
- Schools: 8
- Budget: $83,828,000 (2020-21)
- NCES District ID: 1903540

Students and staff
- Students: 4,678 (2022-23)
- Teachers: 340.11 FTE
- Staff: 265.79
- Student–teacher ratio: 13.75
- Athletic conference: Iowa Alliance Conference

Other information
- Website: amescsd.org

The Ames Community School District is the public school district for most of the city of Ames, Iowa. It is accredited by the North Central Association of Secondary Schools and Colleges and the Iowa Department of Education.

The district is entirely in Story County. Residents of the United Community School District, which covers Luther, a small section of Boone, and other areas, may select the Ames district for secondary schooling.

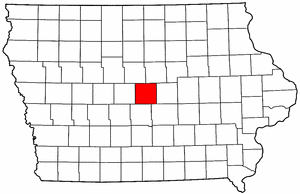
Story County, Iowa highlighted in red.

== Schools ==
There are eight schools in the district, with one high school, one middle school, and six elementary schools.

Sedcondary schools

- Ames High School is located at 1801 Ridgewood Avenue
- Ames Middle School is located on 3915 Mortensen Road.

Elementary ("Primary") schools

There are five elementary schools in the district.

- Edwards Elementary School is located on 820 Miller Avenue.
- Fellows Elementary School is located on 1235 20th Street.
- Meeker Elementary School is located on 300 20th Street.
- Mitchell Elementary School is located on 3521 Jewel Drive.
- Abbie Sawyer Elementary School is located on 4316 Ontario Street.

Prescools

- The Northwood building was an elementary school that was closed. In the summer of 2009, the school district remodeled it for a preschool center. Northwood is located on 302 Duff Avenue.

== Media ==
- Channel 7 is the school district's Educational-access television cable TV channel, which is provided through Mediacom Cable Television as part of a franchise agreement with the City of Ames The district televises their school board meetings through this network.

== See also ==
- Lists of school districts in the United States
- List of school districts in Iowa
