= United Community School District =

School district in Iowa, United States

Coordinates: 42.025875°N 93.775498°W

Location
- Boone, Iowa Boone and Story counties United States
- Coordinates: 42.025875, -93.775498

District information
- Type: Local school district
- Grades: PK-6
- Superintendent: Dr. Pam Dodge
- Schools: 1
- Budget: $8,356,000 (2020-21)
- NCES District ID: 1928560

Students and staff
- Students: 361 (2022-23)
- Teachers: 24.15 FTE
- Staff: 32.05 FTE
- Student–teacher ratio: 14.95
- District mascot: Comets
- Colors: Red and White

Other information
- Website: www.unitedcomets.org

The United Community School District is a public school district headquartered in a rural area outside of Boone, Iowa. The district, which has 133 square miles (340 km^{2}) of area, is mainly in Boone County, with a smaller area in Story County, and serves the town of Luther and the surrounding rural areas between Boone and Ames, including Jordan and Napier. A small piece of the municipality of Boone is in the United CSD limits.

Dr. Pam Dodge, superintendent of Ogden Community School District, became superintendent through a shared agreement in 2020. The previous superintendent, John Chalstrom, was placed on administrative leave in January 2020, after being arrested for drunken driving.

== Schools ==
The district operates one PK-6 school, United Community School. It has a "Boone, Iowa" post office address, but is not in the Boone city limits.

As of 1998 there was a building dedicated to 6th grade classes while other grades were in another building. As of 2020 the school was divided between two buildings, United North and United South. Grades 2-6 were in the southern building while the northern building had younger students.

Since 2009, students from United can attend secondary school in Ames or Boone.

== Student body ==
As of 2025, more than half of the students live in other school districts and go to United CSD through a program which allows them to attend school in another school district.
