= Darlene Rose =

American missionary

Darlene Deibler Rose (died February 24, 2004) was a born-again Christian missionary in Papua New Guinea during and after World War II in what would later be the Western Highlands province. She was the first American woman to enter the Baliem Valley of New Guinea, working there with her first husband, the Rev. C. Russell Deibler. After WWII broke out, the Deiblers were sent to separate prison camps. Russell died at Pare Pare in 1944, but Darlene survived four years in a camp for women at Kampili, where she developed beriberi. Her Christian faith sustained her during those years.

Her experience is documented in the autobiographical Evidence Not Seen: A Woman's Miraculous Faith in a Japanese Prison during WWII (Harper & Row, 1988), which has been optioned for a possible film.

After the war, Darlene married Jerry Rose and resumed missionary work in New Guinea. After nearly thirty years in New Guinea, they relocated to the Australian Outback. She died on February 24, 2004.
