= Luther, Iowa =

- City
- Location of Luther, Iowa
- Coordinates: 41°58′01″N 93°49′04″W
- Country: US
- State: Iowa
- County: Boone
- Township: Worth

Government
  - Type: Mayor-Council

Area
  - Total: 0.59 sq mi (1.52 km^{2})
  - Land: 0.59 sq mi (1.52 km^{2})
  - Water: 0 sq mi (0.00 km^{2})
- Elevation: 1,096 ft (334 m)

Population (2020)
  - Total: 152
  - Density: 258.7/sq mi (99.87/km^{2})
- Time zone: UTC-6 (Central (CST))
  - Summer (DST): UTC-5 (CDT)
- ZIP code: 50152
- Area code: 515
- FIPS code: 19-47280
- GNIS feature ID: 2395786
- Website: www.lutheriowagov.com

Luther is a small city in Worth Township, Boone County, Iowa, United States. The population was 152 at the time of the 2020 census. It is part of the Boone, Iowa Micropolitan Statistical Area, which is a part of the larger Ames-Boone, Iowa Combined Statistical Area.

== History ==
A post office has been in operation at Luther since 1883. Luther was laid out as a town in 1893. The community was named after Clark Luther, a local merchant.

On September 11, 2014, the Luther City Council accepted a petition from 58 residents asking that the city be discontinued. There are several steps in the discontinuation process, including approval or disapproval of the petition by the City Development Board. If the Board approves, a public referendum on discontinuation could be held in 2015. The discontinuance failed and the city continues to exist today. Since 2015 several new businesses have sprung up as well as a major expansion by the local co-op.

== Geography ==
According to the United States Census Bureau, the city has a total area of 0.78 square miles (2.02 km^{2}), all land.

== Demographics ==
Historical populations
Year	Pop.	±%
1910	130	—
1920	145	+11.5%
1930	137	−5.5%
1940	145	+5.8%
1950	131	−9.7%
1960	147	+12.2%
1970	189	+28.6%
1980	155	−18.0%
1990	154	−0.6%
2000	158	+2.6%
2010	122	−22.8%
2020	152	+24.6%
Source:"U.S. Census website". United States Census Bureau. and Iowa Data Center; Source: U.S. Decennial Census

=== 2020 census ===
As of the census of 2020, there were 152 people, 50 households, and 37 families residing in the city. The population density was 258.7 inhabitants per square mile (99.9/km^{2}). There were 60 housing units at an average density of 102.1 per square mile (39.4/km^{2}). The racial makeup of the city was 96.7% White, 0.0% Black or African American, 0.0% Native American, 0.0% Asian, 0.0% Pacific Islander, 0.0% from other races and 3.3% from two or more races. Hispanic or Latino persons of any race comprised 0.7% of the population.

Of the 50 households, 34.0% of which had children under the age of 18 living with them, 68.0% were married couples living together, 4.0% were cohabitating couples, 10.0% had a female householder with no spouse or partner present and 18.0% had a male householder with no spouse or partner present. 26.0% of all households were non-families. 20.0% of all households were made up of individuals, 8.0% had someone living alone who was 65 years old or older.

The median age in the city was 50.6 years. 19.1% of the residents were under the age of 20; 6.6% were between the ages of 20 and 24; 17.8% were from 25 and 44; 31.6% were from 45 and 64; and 25.0% were 65 years of age or older. The gender makeup of the city was 54.6% male and 45.4% female.

=== 2010 census ===
As of the census of 2010, there were 122 people, 54 households, and 40 families living in the city. The population density was 156.4 inhabitants per square mile (60.4/km^{2}). There were 59 housing units at an average density of 75.6 per square mile (29.2/km^{2}). The racial makeup of the city was 98.4% White, 0.8% African American, and 0.8% Asian. Hispanic or Latino of any race were 1.6% of the population.

There were 54 households, of which 20.4% had children under the age of 18 living with them, 66.7% were married couples living together, 3.7% had a female householder with no husband present, 3.7% had a male householder with no wife present, and 25.9% were non-families. 22.2% of all households were made up of individuals, and 9.3% had someone living alone who was 65 years of age or older. The average household size was 2.26 and the average family size was 2.63.

The median age in the city was 47.5 years. 16.4% of residents were under the age of 18; 3.3% were between the ages of 18 and 24; 24.6% were from 25 to 44; 38.6% were from 45 to 64; and 17.2% were 65 years of age or older. The gender makeup of the city was 53.3% male and 46.7% female.

=== 2000 census ===
As of the census of 2000, there were 158 people, 55 households, and 47 families living in the city. The population density was 204.1 inhabitants per square mile (78.8/km^{2}). There were 59 housing units at an average density of 76.2 per square mile (29.4/km^{2}). The racial makeup of the city was 99.37% White and 0.63% Asian.

There were 55 households, out of which 38.2% had children under the age of 18 living with them, 78.2% were married couples living together, 7.3% had a female householder with no husband present, and 14.5% were non-families. 12.7% of all households were made up of individuals, and 3.6% had someone living alone who was 65 years of age or older. The average household size was 2.87 and the average family size was 3.15.

In the city, the population was spread out, with 27.8% under the age of 18, 6.3% from 18 to 24, 32.3% from 25 to 44, 20.9% from 45 to 64, and 12.7% who were 65 years of age or older. The median age was 38 years. For every 100 females, there were 100.0 males. For every 100 females age 18 and over, there were 100.0 males.

The median income for a household in the city was $41,964, and the median income for a family was $41,786. Males had a median income of $29,250 versus $27,083 for females. The per capita income for the city was $14,393. About 11.9% of families and 13.3% of the population were below the poverty line, including 26.3% of those under the age of eighteen and 23.8% of those 65 or over.

== Transportation ==
The community is located on Iowa Highway 17, and is southwest of Ames.

Luther was formerly served by a branch of the Chicago, Milwaukee, St. Paul & Pacific Railroad which ran from Madrid to Boone. The line was trimmed back from Boone to Luther in the 1960s. Sporadic freight service continued to serve the grain elevator in Luther until the line was totally removed in the late 1960s.

== Education ==
It is in the United Community School District, which operates an elementary school. United CSD sends secondary students to Ames CSD and Boone CSD.
