= National Register of Historic Places listings in Des Moines, Iowa =

Comprehensive list of Historic Places in Des Moines

Location of Des Moines in Polk County in Iowa

This is a list of the National Register of Historic Places listings in Des Moines, Iowa.

This is intended to be a complete list of the properties and districts on the National Register of Historic Places in the city of Des Moines, Iowa, United States. Latitude and longitude coordinates are provided for many National Register properties and districts; these locations may be seen together in an online map.

There are 205 properties and districts listed on the National Register in Polk County, including two National Historic Landmarks. The city of Des Moines is the location of 190 properties and districts, including the two National Historic Landmarks, and is listed here, while the remaining properties and districts located elsewhere in the county are listed separately. Three properties were once listed but have since been removed.

This National Park Service list is complete through NPS recent listings posted November 13, 2026.

== Current listings ==
| | Name on the Register | Image | Date listed | Location | Neighborhood | Description |
|---|---|---|---|---|---|---|
| 1 | Abraham Lincoln High School | Abraham Lincoln High School | October 24, 2002 (#02001250) | 2600 SW 9th St. 41°33′43″N 93°37′36″W | Grays Lake | 1922 Tudor Revival high school designed by Proudfoot, Bird & Rawson; exemplifying the modern facilities constructed after the 1907 consolidation of Des Moines' school district. |
| 2 | Acadian Manor Historic District | Acadian Manor Historic District | September 18, 2020 (#100005567) | 2801–2815 Grand Ave. 41°35′05″N 93°39′18″W | | |
| 3 | William W. and Elizabeth J. Ainsworth House | William W. and Elizabeth J. Ainsworth House | October 22, 1998 (#98001275) | 1310 7th St. 41°36′08″N 93°37′38″W | River Bend | 1886 house exemplifying the mode of Queen Anne architecture characterized by extensive spindlework. |
| 4 | American Republic Insurance Company Headquarters Building | American Republic Insurance Company Headquarters Building | December 22, 2015 (#15000917) | 601 6th Ave. 41°35′25″N 93°37′31″W | Downtown | 1965 Modern corporate headquarters, an early and influential master work of architect Gordon Bunshaft of Skidmore, Owings & Merrill. |
| 5 | Josiah Andrews House | Josiah Andrews House | November 1, 1988 (#88001338) | 1128 27th St. 41°35′57″N 93°39′13″W | Drake | 1896 house associated with the innovative financing of Drake University through real estate sales. |
| 6 | Apperson-Iowa Motor Car Company Building | Apperson-Iowa Motor Car Company Building | June 14, 2016 (#16000363) | 1420 Locust St. 41°35′03″N 93°38′08″W | Downtown | 1921 urban auto dealership and wholesaler, a rare surviving example of a once-common business and an important architectural specialty of Proudfoot, Bird & Rawson. |
| 7 | Argonne Building | Argonne Building | September 24, 2020 (#100005608) | 1723–1733 Grand Ave., 515 18th St. 41°35′05″N 93°38′27″W | Downtown | A rare surviving example of a multi-tenant building from Des Moines' interbellum auto sales and service district, built in 1919 with space for multiple dealerships as well as apartments for local workers. |
| 8 | Ashby Manor Historic District | Ashby Manor Historic District | September 4, 1992 (#92001150) | Roughly bounded by Beaver Ave. and Ashby Park; 41°37′30″N 93°40′23″W | Beaverdale | Cohesive residential district reflecting local trends in architecture, landscape architecture, and community planning used to create appealing suburban neighborhoods between the world wars, with 91 contributing properties built 1925–1941. |
| 9 | Ayrshire Apartments | Ayrshire Apartments | October 25, 1996 (#96001144) | 1815 6th Ave. 41°36′39″N 93°37′31″W | River Bend | Tudor Revival apartment hotel built 1919–1920, portraying the redevelopment of 6th Avenue for greater housing density as it became a streetcar and automobile corridor. |
| 10 | William H. and Alice Bailey House | William H. and Alice Bailey House | October 25, 1996 (#96001148) | 1810 6th Ave. 41°36′38″N 93°37′34″W | River Bend | Circa-1889 house owned until 1910 or so by an influential couple of Progressive Era social reformers; William as a city attorney and Alice through women's clubs and charitable institutions. |
| 11 | C.H. Baker Double House | C.H. Baker Double House | October 25, 1996 (#96001153) | 1700–1702 6th Ave. 41°36′33″N 93°37′34″W | River Bend | Exemplary Colonial Revival duplex designed by Smith & Gutterson and built 1901–02 as a harbinger of increasing housing density along the 6th Avenue streetcar corridor. |
| 12 | Baker–DeVotie–Hollingsworth Block | Baker–DeVotie–Hollingsworth Block | November 14, 1978 (#78001256) | 516–526 E. Grand Ave. 41°35′28″N 93°36′39″W | East Village | The East Village's oldest surviving commercial block in Italianate style. Boundary expanded in 2008 to include three buildings constructed in 1877 and 1883. Also a contributing property to the East Des Moines Commercial Historic District. |
| 13 | Walter M. Bartlett Double House | Walter M. Bartlett Double House | October 22, 1998 (#98001279) | 1416–1418 6th Ave. 41°36′17″N 93°37′34″W | River Bend | 1913 duplex representing the first stage of increasing housing density along North Des Moines' streetcar corridors, and exemplifying an emerging building type in late-19th/early-20th-century Des Moines. Damaged by a fire in 2017 and since demolished. |
| 14 | Bates Park Historic District | Bates Park Historic District | October 25, 1996 (#96001154) | 4th St. between Orchard and Clark Sts. 41°36′18″N 93°37′24″W | River Bend | Mixed-income neighborhood around a city park, representing developers' response to the broad appeal of suburban North Des Moines, with 17 contributing properties built c. 1898–1905, including River Bend's largest concentration of Colonial Revival and American Foursquare designs. |
| 15 | William A. and Etta Baum Cottage | William A. and Etta Baum Cottage | October 25, 1996 (#96001147) | 1604 8th St. 41°36′29″N 93°37′43″W | River Bend | Well-preserved Queen Anne cottage built in 1891, and one Des Moines' few 1½-story examples of a design normally used for two-story homes. Also a contributing property to the Polk County Homestead and Trust Company Addition Historic District. |
| 16 | Byron A. Beeson House | Byron A. Beeson House | October 25, 1996 (#96001141) | 1503 5th Ave. 41°36′22″N 93°37′27″W | River Bend | Exemplary large suburban home built c. 1890, particularly noted for its complex Queen Anne roof and unusual flared cornice. |
| 17 | Hill McClelland Bell House | Hill McClelland Bell House | January 11, 1988 (#88001334) | 1091 26th St. 41°35′52″N 93°39′06″W | Drake | 1902 house of Hill M. Bell, president of Drake University 1902–1918, who led the institution through a period of significant growth. |
| 18 | F.A. Benham House | F.A. Benham House | November 5, 1998 (#98001326) | 716 19th. St. 41°35′25″N 93°38′34″W | Sherman Hill | 1884 Eastlake house nominated with its original barn (since demolished) and cast-iron fence as an exemplar of Victorian residential lots. Also a contributing property to the Sherman Hill Historic District. |
| 19 | Byron and Ivan Boyd House | Byron and Ivan Boyd House | April 6, 2004 (#04000263) | 304 42nd St. 41°34′52″N 93°40′29″W | Ingersoll Park | Tudor Revival house and grounds of architect and artist Byron Bennett Boyd (1887–1959), developed 1924–1927 for himself and his wife. |
| 20 | Boyt Company Building | Boyt Company Building | March 10, 2009 (#09000108) | 210 Court Ave. 41°35′07″N 93°37′11″W | Downtown | 1904 leather factory and adjacent alley, the only surviving properties associated with an important leather goods manufacturer that later served as a key military supplier during World War II. |
| 21 | Bryn Mawr Apartments | Bryn Mawr Apartments | October 10, 2017 (#100001699) | 511 29th St. 41°35′07″N 93°39′23″W | Woodland Heights | 1918 apartment building designed by Proudfoot, Bird & Rawson along a streetcar line, and exemplifying the economized kitchenette units adopted during the World War I era. |
| 22 | Burns United Methodist Church | Burns United Methodist Church | June 15, 1977 (#77000546) | 811 Crocker St. 41°35′37″N 93°37′43″W | Downtown | 1912 church that from 1930 to 2011 housed an African American congregation established in 1866. Demolished in 2016. |
| 23 | James Sansom Carpenter House | James Sansom Carpenter House | April 23, 1998 (#98000379) | 3320 Kinsey Ave. 41°36′26″N 93°33′01″W | Grays Woods | 1890s mansion owned from 1906 until his death by engineer James Sansom Carpenter (1870–1939), head of the Iowa Bridge Company and also a key organizer among Des Moines' art collectors. |
| 24 | Larnerd Case House | Larnerd Case House | June 21, 1982 (#82002633) | 3111 Easton Blvd. 41°36′39″N 93°33′23″W | Accent | The oldest standing house in Des Moines, built in Greek Revival style in 1846. The house reflects Polk County's first White settlers as well as changing tastes through its 1890s modifications. |
| 25 | Chaffee-Hunter House | Chaffee-Hunter House | October 22, 1998 (#98001274) | 1821 8th St. 41°36′40″N 93°37′40″W | River Bend | 1886 Queen Anne house associated with a nationally influential postmaster who instituted mailboxes on streetcars. Also a contributing property to the Polk County Homestead and Trust Company Addition Historic District. |
| 26 | D.S. Chamberlain Building | D.S. Chamberlain Building | June 28, 2007 (#07000346) | 1312 Locust St. 41°35′05″N 93°38′03″W | Downtown | Auto dealership designed by Proudfoot, Bird & Rawson and built 1916–17; a rare surviving vestige of Des Moines' importance as a regional auto distributor. |
| 27 | Chautauqua Park Historic District | Chautauqua Park Historic District | March 22, 1990 (#89001776) | Roughly bounded by 16th St., Hickman Rd., and the Chautauqua Parkway; 41°36′46″N 93°38′07″W | Chautauqua Park | Naturalistic and architecturally cohesive subdivision with 102 contributing properties built 1923–1941, exemplifying the attractive residential neighborhoods developed in Des Moines between the World Wars. |
| 28 | Civic Center Historic District | Civic Center Historic District | December 7, 1988 (#88001168) | Both banks of the Des Moines River from the Center St. Dam to the Scott Ave. Dam; 41°35′12″N 93°37′02″W | Downtown | Cohesive riverfront of civic spaces, bridges, and flood control structures embodying the City Beautiful movement, with 13 contributing properties built 1900–1938. |
| 29 | Clemens Automobile Company Building | Clemens Automobile Company Building | May 9, 2009 (#09000272) | 200 10th St. 41°35′03″N 93°37′47″W | Downtown | Well-preserved example of a multistory automotive sales and service building, occupied 1916–1923 by a highly successful local company. |
| 30 | William O. and Mattie M. Coffee House | William O. and Mattie M. Coffee House | December 3, 2024 (#100011107) | 4140 Grand Ave. 41°35′04″N 93°40′26″W | Salisbury Oaks | Excellent and locally rare example of a Châteauesque house, designed by Hallett & Rawson and built 1902–1904 by contractor W.F. Mitchell & Co. |
| 31 | College Corner Commercial Historic Business District | College Corner Commercial Historic Business District | April 23, 1998 (#98000385) | Euclid Ave. between 2nd and 3rd Aves. 41°37′39″N 93°37′13″W | Highland Park | Five well-preserved commercial properties built c.-1890–1930, reflecting the blossoming of a neighborhood underpinned by streetcar and automobile access and the proximity of Highland Park College/Des Moines University. |
| 32 | Cottage Grove Avenue Presbyterian Church | Cottage Grove Avenue Presbyterian Church | September 12, 2016 (#16000607) | 1050 24th St. 41°35′49″N 93°39′00″W | Drake | Neoclassical church (built 1917–1918 onto an existing 1903 wing, with a 1954 addition) noted for its City Beautiful design by Clinton P. Shockley and for its decades of progressive community service in the early 20th century. |
| 33 | Court Avenue Bridge | Court Avenue Bridge | May 15, 1998 (#98000489) | Court Ave. over the Des Moines River; 41°35′10″N 93°37′00″W | Downtown | |
| 34 | Crane Building | Crane Building | August 30, 2001 (#01000914) | 1440 Walnut St. 41°35′00″N 93°38′09″W | Downtown | 1916 industrial building noted for its refined Chicago School architecture by Sawyer & Watrous. |
| 35 | Crawford House | Crawford House | January 27, 1983 (#83000398) | 2203 Grand Ave. 41°35′05″N 93°38′51″W | Woodland Heights | Intact 1896 example of the ostentatious mansions of successful self-made men that were once numerous along Grand Avenue at the turn of the 20th century. |
| 36 | Albert Baird Cummins House | Albert Baird Cummins House | June 30, 1982 (#82002634) | 2404 Forest Dr. 41°35′02″N 93°39′01″W | | Home c. 1893–1920 of Progressive Era politician Albert B. Cummins (1850–1926), governor of Iowa for three terms and U.S. Senator for 18 years. |
| 37 | Jay Norwood and Genevieve Pendleton Darling House | Jay Norwood and Genevieve Pendleton Darling House | September 30, 1992 (#91001838) | 2320 Terrace Rd. 41°34′56″N 93°38′55″W | | Home of editorial cartoonist and conservation leader Jay "Ding" Darling (1876–1962); expanded eclectically during his 1917–1955 residency to blend into the natural surroundings. |
| 38 | Davidson Bros. Company Warehouse and Manufacturing Building | Davidson Bros. Company Warehouse and Manufacturing Building | November 29, 2024 (#100011064) | 108 SW 3rd St. 41°35′03″N 93°37′13″W | Downtown | Distinctive remnant of a late-19th/early-20th-century industrial district, occupied 1901–1928 by a produce wholesaler and manufacturer of candy and chocolates. |
| 39 | Professor Charles O. Denny House | Professor Charles O. Denny House | September 8, 1988 (#88001329) | 1084 25th St. 41°35′51″N 93°39′04″W | Drake | Circa-1893 house associated with the innovative financing of Drake University through real estate sales. |
| 40 | Des Moines Art Center | Des Moines Art Center | October 19, 2004 (#03000063) | 4700 Grand Ave. 41°35′02″N 93°40′53″W | Westwood | Art museum with a 1948 core designed by Eliel Saarinen and a 1968 addition by I. M. Pei, which helped set the late-20th-century trend of museums expanding with sprawling wings commissioned from avant-garde architects. |
| 41 | Des Moines Building | Des Moines Building | October 16, 2013 (#13000829) | 405 6th Ave. 41°35′14″N 93°37′29″W | Downtown | 1931 Art Deco skyscraper, a style evolution for Proudfoot, Rawson, Souers & Thomas and an anchor for Iowa's densest urban street. |
| 42 | Des Moines Fire Department Headquarters–Fire Station No. 1 and Shop Building | Des Moines Fire Department Headquarters–Fire Station No. 1 and Shop Building | April 7, 2014 (#14000113) | 900 Mulberry St., 100 9th St. 41°35′01″N 93°37′41″W | Downtown | PWA Moderne fire station complex built in 1937 as a New Deal project. |
| 43 | Des Moines Saddlery Company Building | Des Moines Saddlery Company Building | June 27, 1985 (#85001378) | 307–311 Court Ave. 41°35′08″N 93°37′16″W | Downtown | Des Moines' largest and most intact Italianate commercial building, constructed in four phases c.-1878–1920. |
| 44 | Des Moines Western Railway Freight House | Des Moines Western Railway Freight House | July 10, 2008 (#08000682) | 625 E. Court Ave. 41°35′16″N 93°36′28″W | East Village | Freight depot built 1902–03 and expanded with passenger service in the 1930s; one of the few surviving vestiges of the interurban rail transport that was instrumental to Des Moines' growth. |
| 45 | Drake University Campus Historic District | Drake University Campus Historic District | September 8, 1988 (#88001341) | Roughly two blocks along University Ave. near 25th St. 41°36′04″N 93°39′08″W | Drake | Four core buildings of Des Moines' oldest surviving university (established in 1881) plus an adjacent church; symbolizing Drake's early leaders and the Disciples of Christ, the growth of higher education in the city, and the settlement of the surrounding neighborhood. |
| 46 | Earle & LeBosquet Block | Earle & LeBosquet Block | June 11, 2009 (#09000402) | 407–409 Court Ave. 41°35′07″N 93°37′20″W | Downtown | 1896 building designed by Charles E. Eastman in a superlative mix of Neoclassical and Chicago School architecture. Listing includes a circa-1953 neon sign. |
| 47 | East Des Moines Commercial Historic District | East Des Moines Commercial Historic District | March 22, 2019 (#100003523) | Roughly bounded by E. 4th, Des Moines, E. 6th, and E. Locust Sts. 41°35′27″N 93°36′39″W | East Village | Long-serving commercial center with Des Moines' largest collection of mid-19th- to early-20th-century storefronts; 33 contributing properties built 1873–1959, including buildings associated with the city's Scandinavian and Eastern European Jewish immigrants. |
| 48 | East Des Moines Industrial Historic District | East Des Moines Industrial Historic District | October 4, 2017 (#100001700) | Roughly E. 2nd to E. 5th & E. Walnut to E. Market Sts. • Boundary increase (listed March 10, 2023, refnum 100008682): 401 E. Court Ave. 41°35′10″N 93°36′46″W | East Village | Late-19th/early-20th-century manufacturing, warehousing, and railroad district with 37 contributing properties built 1874–1956, with many of the last surviving local examples of their building types. |
| 49 | Elliott Furniture Company | Elliott Furniture Company | January 14, 2015 (#14001149) | 424 E. Locust St. 41°35′23″N 93°36′42″W | East Village | Furniture store active 1882–1959, exemplifying an important sector of the local economy and charting the architectural evolution of a retail space, culminating in a 1936 Art Moderne façade. Also a contributing property to the East Des Moines Commercial Historic District. |
| 50 | The Elmwood-The Oaks-The Birches | The Elmwood-The Oaks-The Birches | February 17, 2021 (#100006155) | 2315 Grand Ave. 41°35′05″N 93°38′55″W | Woodland Heights | |
| 51 | Equitable Life Insurance Company of Iowa Building | Equitable Life Insurance Company of Iowa Building | April 21, 2015 (#15000154) | 604 Locust St. & 316 6th Ave. 41°35′12″N 93°37′31″W | Downtown | 1924 Gothic Revival skyscraper designed by Proudfoot, Bird & Rawson for one of the many firms making Des Moines a national center for the insurance industry. |
| 52 | Edward B. and Nettie E. Evans House | Edward B. and Nettie E. Evans House | April 1, 2002 (#02000294) | 1410 19th St. 41°36′16″N 93°38′34″W | King Irving | Nominated as a leading local leading example of a Queen Anne house with Neoclassical elements, built c. 1899. Demolished in 2024. |
| 53 | Financial Center Office Building | Financial Center Office Building | April 22, 2025 (#100011415) | 207 7th St. 41°35′07″N 93°37′31″W | Downtown | International Style office building completed in 1973. |
| 54 | Fire Station No. 4 | Fire Station No. 4 | June 27, 1979 (#79000923) | 1041 8th St. 41°35′47″N 93°37′40″W | Cheatom Park | Circa-1896 fire station typifying the handful of such facilities built in Des Moines around the turn of the 20th century. |
| 55 | Firestone District Office and Warehouse | Firestone District Office and Warehouse | December 5, 2022 (#100008431) | 1775 East Euclid St. 41°37′36″N 93°35′20″W | | |
| 56 | First Methodist Episcopal Church | First Methodist Episcopal Church | April 12, 1984 (#84001295) | 1001 Pleasant St. 41°35′21″N 93°37′52″W | Downtown | Prominent Neoclassical church designed by Proudfoot & Bird and built 1905–1908. |
| 57 | Fish and Game Pavilion and Aquarium | Fish and Game Pavilion and Aquarium | December 23, 1991 (#91001836) | Iowa State Fairgrounds; 41°35′46″N 93°33′24″W | Valley High Manor | Circa-1925 aquarium and surrounding 1928 pavilion—distinctive public buildings designed by Proudfoot, Rawson & Souers for the first Iowa state agency to conduct conservation outreach. Also a contributing property to the Iowa State Fair and Exposition Grounds Historic District. |
| 58 | F. W. Fitch Company Historic District | F. W. Fitch Company Historic District | April 9, 2013 (#13000147) | 300–306 15th and 1510–1526 Walnut Sts. 41°35′00″N 93°38′13″W | Downtown | Factory complex occupied 1917–1949 by the F. W. Fitch Company, one of two major firms making Des Moines a national center for the era's personal care product industry. |
| 59 | Fleming Building | Fleming Building | May 22, 2002 (#02000541) | 218 6th Ave. 41°35′09″N 93°37′29″W | Downtown | Early skyscraper with transitional Chicago School architecture, built in 1907 as one of Iowa's first steel frame buildings and one of the state's few designs by D. H. Burnham & Company. |
| 60 | Flynn–Griffin Building | Flynn–Griffin Building | May 3, 2016 (#16000215) | 319 7th St. 41°35′11″N 93°37′33″W | Downtown | Long-serving 1885/1906 commercial building under early Iowa developer Martin Flynn (1840–1906) and later the focus of a consequential 1948 desegregation case by civil rights activist Edna Griffin (1909–2000). |
| 61 | Fort Des Moines Provisional Army Officer Training School | Fort Des Moines Provisional Army Officer Training School | May 30, 1974 (#74000805) | Fort Des Moines Military Reservation; 41°31′18″N 93°37′11″W | Fort Des Moines | Surviving buildings of a military complex built 1901–1903; significant as the site where, in 1917, the U.S. Army first trained African Americans to serve as officers. |
| 62 | Franklin Apartments | Franklin Apartments | October 25, 1996 (#96001142) | 1811 6th Ave. 41°36′38″N 93°37′31″W | River Bend | 1914 apartment building and detached garage stemming from adaptive reuse of a c.-1897 single-family home, illustrating the shift to higher density along Des Moines' arterial roads with streetcar service. Also noted for its 1918 remodel by Morrison & Thorne. |
| 63 | Rees Gabriel House | Rees Gabriel House | December 21, 1978 (#78001250) | 1701 Pennsylvania Ave. 41°36′33″N 93°36′34″W | Union Park | Well-preserved Queen Anne house built circa 1896. |
| 64 | Goddard Bungalow Court Historic District | Goddard Bungalow Court Historic District | November 21, 2000 (#00000930) | 1410–21 Goddard Court and 1232 14th St. 41°36′05″N 93°38′10″W | King Irving | Early and well preserved example of a pre-automobile bungalow court, built by individual homeowners in 1916 with 13 contributing properties. |
| 65 | Lowry W. and Hattie N. Goode First North Des Moines House | Lowry W. and Hattie N. Goode First North Des Moines House | October 22, 1998 (#98001280) | 1813 7th St. 41°36′39″N 93°37′36″W | River Bend | One of the few surviving buildings associated with Des Moines' leading 19th-century real estate developer, Lowry W. Goode. Built c. 1884 as one of the city's very few single-family homes with structural brick walls. |
| 66 | Grand View College (Old Main) | Grand View College (Old Main) | May 23, 1978 (#78001252) | 1200 Grandview Ave. 41°37′15″N 93°36′16″W | Union Park | Original building of Grand View University, built 1895–1904 and enlarged again in 1929; noted for its Danish Renaissance Revival architecture. Now the university's Humphrey Center. |
| 67 | Greek Orthodox Church of Saint George | Greek Orthodox Church of Saint George | February 28, 1997 (#97000101) | 1118 35th St. 41°35′56″N 93°39′53″W | Drake | Small 1906 church designed by Proudfoot & Bird and acquired in 1930 by an Eastern Orthodox parish, becoming the crux of Des Moines' Greek American community. |
| 68 | Greenwood Park Plats Historic District | Greenwood Park Plats Historic District | April 24, 2013 (#13000068) | Roughly 39th to 42nd Sts., approx. Grand Ave. to Center & Pleasant Sts., 4006, 4024 Grand Ave. 41°35′17″N 93°40′17″W | North of Grand | Former suburb and state fairgrounds at the heart of Des Moines' western expansion, with 278 contributing properties built 1879–1962, further noted for its architectural mix of two-story houses and bungalows, two Gothic Revival churches, and mid-century medical buildings. |
| 69 | Grocers Wholesale Company Building | Grocers Wholesale Company Building | April 25, 2008 (#08000330) | 22 W. 9th St. 41°34′59″N 93°37′40″W | Downtown | 1916 facility of Iowa's most successful and only statewide grocery warehouse cooperative, which operated 1912–1985. |
| 70 | F.E. Haley Double House | F.E. Haley Double House | October 22, 1998 (#98001278) | 1233–1235 7th St. 41°36′06″N 93°37′36″W | River Bend | 1897 duplex, an early example of a residence type that became popular in the area around the turn of the 20th century. |
| 71 | Hallett Flat–Rawson & Co. Apartment Building | Hallett Flat–Rawson & Co. Apartment Building | December 1, 2000 (#00001456) | 1301–1307 Locust St. 41°35′07″N 93°38′02″W | Downtown | Exemplary mixed-use property designed by leading local architects, comprising a 1904 Colonial Revival apartment building by George E. Hallett and a 1915 Chicago School commercial/residential building by Proudfoot, Bird & Rawson. |
| 72 | L. Harbach and Sons Furniture Warehouse and Factory Complex | L. Harbach and Sons Furniture Warehouse and Factory Complex | December 21, 2015 (#15000918) | 300–316 SW 5th St. 41°34′52″N 93°37′19″W | Downtown | 1906 two-building complex owned successively by three major furniture companies up to 1985, the first company—L. Harbach & Sons—being additionally significant for the family's commercial and civic contributions to Des Moines 1850s–1920s. |
| 73 | Dr. John B. and Anna M. Hatton House | Dr. John B. and Anna M. Hatton House | April 23, 1998 (#98000408) | 1730 7th St. 41°36′36″N 93°37′38″W | River Bend | Highly ornamented Stick style house with a canted bay tower and Italianate influences, built c. 1887, exemplifying a subtype of the style once prevalent in Des Moines' former suburbs. Also a contributing property to the Polk County Homestead and Trust Company Addition Historic District. |
| 74 | Hawkeye Insurance Company Building | Hawkeye Insurance Company Building | April 28, 1986 (#86000874) | 209 4th St. 41°35′07″N 93°37′18″W | Downtown | Downtown's oldest intact commercial building (dating to 1868) and the vanguard of Des Moines becoming the nation's first property insurance capital outside of the East Coast. |
| 75 | Hawkeye Transfer Company Warehouse | Hawkeye Transfer Company Warehouse | March 22, 2010 (#10000077) | 702 Elm St. 41°34′51″N 93°37′28″W | Downtown | 1902 warehouse built as part of Frederick M. Hubbell's new industrial district, and successively occupied by two of Des Moines' leading warehousing companies. |
| 76 | William B. Hayes House | William B. Hayes House | October 25, 1996 (#96001140) | 1547 Arlington Ave. 41°36′27″N 93°37′19″W | River Bend | One of Des Moines' best remaining examples of the Swiss chalet subtype of Stick style—built in 1886—and one of the better documented homes constructed by Lowry W. Goode, a major local real estate promoter. |
| 77 | Allen Hazen Water Tower | Allen Hazen Water Tower | August 11, 2004 (#04000819) | 4800 Hickman Rd. 41°36′51″N 93°41′02″W | Beaverdale | 1931 water tower noted for its masterful Neoclassical architecture and association with nationally influential water supply engineer Allen Hazen. |
| 78 | Henshie–Briggs Row House | Henshie–Briggs Row House | August 8, 2001 (#01000855) | 1614 Woodland Ave. 41°35′16″N 93°38′23″W | Sherman Hill | Circa-1883 row house, one of the few surviving examples of a popular building type in 19th-century Des Moines. Moved from 1106 High St. in 2008. |
| 79 | Herndon Hall | Herndon Hall | July 27, 1977 (#77000547) | 2000 Grand Ave. 41°35′02″N 93°38′38″W | Downtown | 1881 Queen Anne mansion of Jefferson Scott Polk (1831–1907), a key figure behind Des Moines' streetcar system, interurban railways, and annexation of its suburbs. |
| 80 | Herring Motor Car Company Building | Herring Motor Car Company Building | December 6, 2004 (#04001325) | 110 W. 10th St. 41°35′00″N 93°37′45″W | Downtown | Des Moines' first and largest multistory automotive building, built in 1912 from designs by Proudfoot, Bird & Rawson for the city's leading auto sales and supply company. |
| 81 | Highland Park Historic Business District at Euclid and Sixth Avenues | Highland Park Historic Business District at Euclid and Sixth Avenues | July 15, 1998 (#98000867) | Roughly the junction of Euclid and 6th Aves. 41°37′42″N 93°37′29″W | Highland Park | Des Moines' most successful and best preserved late-19th/early-20th-century commercial district outside of downtown, with 18 contributing properties built 1893–1938. |
| 82 | Hippee Building | Hippee Building | April 17, 2018 (#100002325) | 206 6th Ave. 41°35′07″N 93°37′29″W | Downtown | 1913 Beaux-Arts skyscraper designed by Sawyer & Watrous; home 1914–1926 of the loan and trust company that developed many of the city's residential areas. |
| 83 | Hohberger Building | Hohberger Building | September 12, 2002 (#02001019) | 502–506 E. Locust St. 41°35′24″N 93°36′39″W | East Village | One of Des Moines' few remaining examples of a building with a cast-iron frame, constructed in 1898. Also a contributing property to the East Des Moines Commercial Historic District. |
| 84 | Home Federal Savings and Loan Association of Des Moines Building | Home Federal Savings and Loan Association of Des Moines Building | January 24, 2017 (#100000561) | 601 Grand Ave. 41°35′17″N 93°37′33″W | Downtown | 1962 Modern building and plaza designed by Ludwig Mies van der Rohe. |
| 85 | Home of Marshall's Horseradish | Home of Marshall's Horseradish | October 22, 1998 (#98001285) | 1546 2nd Pl. 41°36′26″N 93°37′17″W | River Bend | Family-owned horseradish producer in operation c. 1886–1940, with three contributing properties, reflecting the small businesses that processed foodstuffs for local consumption before large corporations dominated the market. |
| 86 | Homestead Building | Homestead Building | March 5, 1982 (#82002635) | 303 Locust St. 41°35′16″N 93°37′18″W | Downtown | Richardsonian Romanesque headquarters built 1893/1905 for the Iowa Homestead, a formative and influential agricultural journal led by Henry Wallace and James M. Pierce. |
| 87 | Hotel Fort Des Moines | Hotel Fort Des Moines | September 16, 1982 (#82002636) | 1000 Walnut St. 41°35′04″N 93°37′47″W | Downtown | Hotel built 1918–19, exemplifying the work of Proudfoot, Bird & Rawson, Iowa's leading architectural firm for the first three decades of the 20th century. |
| 88 | Hotel Kirkwood | Hotel Kirkwood | December 10, 2003 (#03001256) | 400 Walnut St. 41°35′10″N 93°37′20″W | Downtown | 1930 Art Deco hotel designed by H.L. Stevens & Company that established new trends in design and height for Des Moines' downtown hotels. |
| 89 | Hotel Randolph | Hotel Randolph | June 11, 2009 (#09000403) | 200–204 4th St. 41°35′07″N 93°37′19″W | Downtown | 1912 hotel designed by H.L. Stevens & Company that introduced reinforced concrete construction to Des Moines. |
| 90 | Hubbell Building | Hubbell Building | August 11, 2004 (#04000818) | 904 Walnut St. 41°35′05″N 93°37′42″W | Downtown | 1913 commercial building that housed until 1954 the headquarters of the F.M. Hubbell business dynasty, centered on Iowa's leading investment firm in the early 20th century. |
| 91 | Hubbell Warehouse | Hubbell Warehouse | November 12, 2010 (#10000894) | 340 SW 5th St. 41°34′49″N 93°37′18″W | Downtown | Rail-connected warehouse whose original 1913 wing by Proudfoot, Bird & Rawson was one of Des Moines' first uses of reinforced concrete construction. Also noted for its association with Frederick M. Hubbell's company, which was instrumental in developing the surrounding 20th-century industrial district and its railroad infrastructure. |
| 92 | Ingersoll Place Plat Historic District | Ingersoll Place Plat Historic District | November 21, 2000 (#00000931) | 28th, Linden, and High Sts. 41°35′14″N 93°39′11″W | Woodland Heights | Cohesive neighborhood with 52 contributing properties built 1900–1923, illustrating Des Moines' successful early-20th-century drive for homeownership primarily via construction of bungalows and two-story square houses. |
| 93 | Iowa Commission for the Blind Building | Iowa Commission for the Blind Building | July 1, 2010 (#09000714) | 524 4th St. 41°35′21″N 93°37′23″W | Downtown | State agency led 1958–1978 by Dr. Kenneth Jernigan (1926–1998), a nationally influential leader for better civil rights and achievements for people with blindness. |
| 94 | Iowa Ford Tractor Company Repair and Warehouse Building | Iowa Ford Tractor Company Repair and Warehouse Building | March 8, 2021 (#100006262) | 213 13th St. 41°35′01″N 93°37′57″W | Downtown | |
| 95 | Iowa State Capitol | Iowa State Capitol | October 21, 1976 (#76000799) | 1007 E. Grand Ave. 41°35′28″N 93°36′14″W | East Village | Long-serving capitol building constructed 1871–1886, noted for its elaborate interior and exterior decoration and its association with Iowa's state government. |
| 96 | Iowa State Fair and Exposition Grounds Historic District | Iowa State Fair and Exposition Grounds Historic District | September 14, 1987 (#87000014) | 3000 E. Grand Ave. 41°35′46″N 93°32′57″W | Valley High Manor | Unified collection of 40 fair and exposition buildings constructed 1886–1936, reflecting adherence to long-term planning, consistent use of architects Keffer & Jones, and employment of several prominent landscape architects. |
| 97 | Iowa State Historical Building | Iowa State Historical Building | November 14, 1978 (#78001251) | 1112 E. Grand Ave. 41°35′34″N 93°36′10″W | East Village | An exemplar of Beaux-Arts architecture, built 1899–1910. Renamed the Ola Babcock Miller Building in 1987. |
| 98 | Iowa-Des Moines National Bank Building | Iowa-Des Moines National Bank Building | July 10, 1979 (#79000924) | 520 Walnut St. 41°35′09″N 93°37′27″W | Downtown | Atypical bank with ground-floor retail space, built 1931–1932; the most imposing of downtown Des Moines' few Art Deco buildings. |
| 99 | Capt. Nicholas W. and Emma Johnson House | Capt. Nicholas W. and Emma Johnson House | December 6, 1990 (#90001854) | 2100 University Ave. 41°36′01″N 93°38′44″W | Drake Park | Locally unusual example of a Queen Anne house with Châteauesque details, built in 1896. |
| 100 | Dr. Anna E. and Andrew A. Johnstone House | Dr. Anna E. and Andrew A. Johnstone House | October 25, 1996 (#96001152) | 1830 8th St. 41°36′40″N 93°37′43″W | River Bend | Circa-1887 Queen Anne house in which Dr. Anna E. Johnstone operated an osteopathy clinic c.-1906–1945, reflecting the rise of women in medicine and other professions in the Progressive Era. Also a contributing property to the Polk County Homestead and Trust Company Addition Historic District. |
| 101 | G.W. Jones Building | G.W. Jones Building | June 14, 2016 (#16000364) | 1430 Locust St. 41°35′03″N 93°38′09″W | Downtown | 1920 showroom and repair shop, a rare surviving example of a common property type in Des Moines' interwar automotive industry, and an important architectural specialty of Proudfoot, Bird & Rawson. |
| 102 | Rev. R.W. and Fannie E. Keeler House | Rev. R.W. and Fannie E. Keeler House | November 4, 1993 (#93001184) | 1430 10th St. 41°36′20″N 93°37′51″W | King Irving | Des Moines' best surviving example of Stick style, built circa 1889 by John W. Detwiler and James C. Bedford, a well-documented local contractor partnership. |
| 103 | Kingman Place Historic District | Kingman Place Historic District | November 21, 2000 (#00000928) | 27th to 31st Sts., Kingman Boulevard, Rutland St. and Cottage Ave. 41°35′51″N 93°39′21″W | Drake | Unusually cohesive neighborhood of American Foursquare houses with 129 contributing properties built 1900–1915; associated with Des Moines' first explosion of urban growth and middle-class homeownership, fueled by promoters, developers, and streetcar access. |
| 104 | Francis M. Kirkham House | Francis M. Kirkham House | September 8, 1988 (#88001328) | 1026 24th St. 41°35′46″N 93°39′00″W | Drake | Circa-1888 house associated with the innovative financing of Drake University through real estate sales; initially owned by a university trustee who co-organized the land sales company. |
| 105 | Nellie and Thomas Knotts House | Nellie and Thomas Knotts House | September 8, 1988 (#88001333) | 1021 26th St. 41°35′45″N 93°39′07″W | Drake | Circa-1894 house associated with Drake University's innovative financing through real estate sales. |
| 106 | Kromer Flats | Kromer Flats | October 25, 1996 (#96001151) | 1433–1439 6th Ave. 41°36′18″N 93°37′32″W | River Bend | Italian Renaissance Revival apartment building designed by Liebbe, Nourse & Rasmussen and built 1904–5, reflecting the higher-density housing options introduced to 6th Avenue as it became a streetcar and automobile corridor. |
| 107 | The Lexington | The Lexington | December 12, 1976 (#76000800) | 1721 Pleasant St. 41°35′24″N 93°38′28″W | Sherman Hill | Des Moines' first high-rise apartment building, constructed in 1908, which translated 18th-century domestic styles into a new building form and featured innovations such as an automated elevator. Also a contributing property to the Sherman Hill Historic District. |
| 108 | Liberty Building | Liberty Building | July 22, 2010 (#10000488) | 418 6th Ave. 41°35′15″N 93°37′32″W | Downtown | 1924 skyscraper emblematic of Des Moines' national prominence in the insurance industry and of the city's preeminent downtown architects of the era: Proudfoot, Bird & Rawson. |
| 109 | Linden Heights Historic District | Linden Heights Historic District | December 10, 2003 (#03001262) | Foster Dr., Glenview Dr., Woodlawn, and Park Hill Dr. west of SW. 42nd St. 41°34′27″N 93°40′36″W | Linden Heights | Affluent neighborhood with 160 contributing properties built 1912–1956, marking Des Moines' westward residential growth, early use of curvilinear streets and bus transit, and superlative adaptations of three waves of popular architectural styles. |
| 110 | Richard T.C. Lord and William V. Wilcox House | Richard T.C. Lord and William V. Wilcox House | September 8, 1988 (#88001336) | 2416 Kingman Blvd. 41°35′47″N 93°39′03″W | Drake | Circa-1888 house associated with the innovative financing of Drake University through real estate sales; initially owned by a university trustee who co-organized the land sales company. |
| 111 | Mack-International Motor Truck Corporation Building | Mack-International Motor Truck Corporation Building | January 17, 2017 (#100000488) | 121 12th St. 41°35′00″N 93°37′52″W | Downtown | A rare surviving example of a truck sales and service center from Des Moines' interwar automotive district; built in 1924 by prominent local contractor J.E. Lovejoy with offices for his firm. |
| 112 | Mahnke House | Mahnke House | October 13, 1983 (#83003622) | 2707 High St. 41°35′14″N 93°39′12″W | Woodland Heights | 1909 Prairie School house. Also a contributing property to the Ingersoll Place Plat Historic District. |
| 113 | The Maine | The Maine | October 25, 1996 (#96001143) | 1635 6th Ave. 41°36′32″N 93°37′31″W | River Bend | 1913 Prairie School/American Craftsman luxury apartment building and detached garage reflecting the higher-density housing options introduced to Des Moines as 6th Avenue became a streetcar and automobile corridor. |
| 114 | Maish House | Maish House | April 11, 1977 (#77000548) | 1623 Center St. 41°35′31″N 93°38′24″W | Sherman Hill | 1882 Italianate house with Eastlake details, exemplifying the fine homes built by Des Moines' successful 19th-century businessmen. Also a contributing property to the Sherman Hill Historic District. |
| 115 | Masonic Temple of Des Moines | Masonic Temple of Des Moines | August 29, 1997 (#97000961) | 1011 Locust St. 41°35′09″N 93°37′49″W | Downtown | Masonic lodge built 1912–13; a masterful work of Proudfoot, Bird & Rawson, with well preserved interiors and an exterior designed to blend into the commercial streetscape. |
| 116 | Minnie Y. and Frank P. Mattes House | Minnie Y. and Frank P. Mattes House | December 16, 2009 (#09001090) | 1305 34th St. 41°36′09″N 93°39′46″W | Drake | 1910 Tudor Revival house, garage, and retaining wall; a masterful example of Proudfoot, Bird & Rawson's residential designs. |
| 117 | Methodist Deaconess Institute–Esther Hall | Methodist Deaconess Institute–Esther Hall | March 4, 2009 (#09000067) | 921 Pleasant St. 41°35′21″N 93°37′50″W | Downtown | Women's residential school established in 1922, significant for its role in increasing opportunities for women and for its Colonial Revival architecture by Proudfoot, Bird & Rawson. |
| 118 | Middlesex Plat Historic District | Middlesex Plat Historic District | November 21, 2000 (#00000932) | Center St. to Woodland Ave., 31st to 35th Sts. 41°35′24″N 93°39′42″W | Drake | Housing development with 241 contributing properties built 1910–1923; an unusually large plat to fill in quickly and consistently with the promised mix of bungalows and two-story houses, representing a major step in the westward growth of Des Moines' residential neighborhoods. |
| 119 | Municipal Building | Municipal Building | November 10, 1977 (#77000549) | 400 Robert D. Ray Dr. 41°35′21″N 93°37′00″W | East Village | Des Moines City Hall, built 1909–10. Noted for its Beaux-Arts architecture and for Des Moines' influential embrace of city commission government. Also a contributing property to the Civic Center Historic District. |
| 120 | Murillo Flats | Murillo Flats | June 9, 2009 (#09000404) | 605 16th St. 41°35′14″N 93°38′19″W | Sherman Hill | 1905 apartment building exemplifying the emergence of comfortable middle-class rental housing with restrained Neoclassical architecture over the ornate Victorian architecture and crowded tenements and row houses of the prior age. |
| 121 | National Biscuit Company Building | National Biscuit Company Building | May 6, 2009 (#09000273) | 1001 Cherry St. 41°34′59″N 93°37′45″W | Downtown | Iowa's leading cracker factory and distribution center 1906–1926, representing the consolidation of the baking industry and the longstanding market dominance of the company now known as Nabisco. |
| 122 | Naylor House | Naylor House | July 10, 1974 (#74000806) | 944 W. 9th St. 41°35′42″N 93°37′46″W | Downtown | Largely unaltered 1869 house, one of Des Moines' most intact examples of Victorian architecture. |
| 123 | The New Lawn | The New Lawn | October 25, 1996 (#96001150) | 1245 6th Ave. 41°36′08″N 93°37′32″W | River Bend | Prairie School apartment building designed by Morrison & Thorne and built 1914–1915, reflecting the redevelopment of 6th Avenue for greater housing density as it became a streetcar and automobile corridor. |
| 124 | Newens Sanitary Dairy Historic District | Newens Sanitary Dairy Historic District | December 17, 2003 (#03000062) | 2225 and 2300–2312 University Ave. 41°36′01″N 93°38′55″W | Drake Park | Dairy processing plant built c.-1913–1922, and the facing home of owners Lynn and Susan Newens; a rare vestige of the adoption and marketing of new food safety practices in the early-20th-century dairy industry. |
| 125 | Norman Apartment Building | Norman Apartment Building | September 8, 1988 (#88001327) | 3103 University Ave. 41°36′02″N 93°39′36″W | Drake | 1908 apartment building constructed by Drake University as an investment property. |
| 126 | Northwestern Hotel | Northwestern Hotel | January 12, 1984 (#84001300) | 321 E. Walnut St. 41°35′17″N 93°36′45″W | East Village | Highly intact Renaissance Revival hotel designed by Proudfoot, Bird & Rawson and built 1915–16 to serve the Chicago and North Western Railway depot. Also a contributing property to the East Des Moines Industrial Historic District. |
| 127 | The Oaklands Historic District | The Oaklands Historic District | October 25, 1996 (#96001155) | Oakland and Arlington Aves. between Franklin and College Aves. 41°36′34″N 93°37′22″W | River Bend | Upper- and upper-middle-class subdivision with 54 contributing properties built 1884–1922, associated with North Des Moines' late-19th-century real estate boom and prominent developer Lowry W. Goode, and illustrating popular architectural styles by several prominent firms and naturalistic landscape architecture. |
| 128 | F. F. Odenweller–James P. and Nettie Morey House | F. F. Odenweller–James P. and Nettie Morey House | November 1, 1988 (#88001337) | 1115 27th St. 41°35′56″N 93°39′11″W | Drake | Circa-1896 house associated with Drake University's innovative financing through real estate sales. |
| 129 | Owl's Head Historic District | Owl's Head Historic District | October 11, 1978 (#78001253) | Ridge Rd., Forest Dr., and 28th and 29th Sts. 41°34′58″N 93°39′21″W | Owl's Head | Residential neighborhood developed 1890–1915 thanks to the advent of streetcar transit, with about 50 contributing properties further noted for their cohesive design by several prominent local architects and firms. |
| 130 | George B. Peak House | George B. Peak House | November 14, 1978 (#78001254) | 1080 22nd St. 41°35′52″N 93°38′50″W | Drake Park | 1900 house noted for its atypical Colonial Revival architecture and association with insurance executive George B. Peak (1857–1923). |
| 131 | Perry and Brainard Block | Perry and Brainard Block | October 25, 1996 (#96001149) | 1601 6th Ave. 41°36′28″N 93°37′32″W | River Bend | 1889 town hall, the only surviving public building in Des Moines' formerly independent suburbs to bear witness to the 1889–1890 debate, election, and celebration around the decision to allow annexation and school consolidation. |
| 132 | Plymouth Place | Plymouth Place | April 14, 2015 (#15000140) | 4111 Ingersoll Ave. 41°35′13″N 93°40′25″W | North of Grand | Cylindrical high-rise apartment building constructed in 1968, noted for its exceptional Modern architecture. |
| 133 | Polk County Courthouse | Polk County Courthouse | April 30, 1979 (#79000925) | 500 Mulberry St. 41°35′05″N 93°37′25″W | Downtown | One of Iowa's largest courthouses—completed in 1909—and one of its few surviving examples in Beaux-Arts style. |
| 134 | Polk County Homestead and Trust Company Addition Historic District | Polk County Homestead and Trust Company Addition Historic District | October 4, 2016 (#16000687) | Both sides of 7th & 8th Sts., S. of Franklin & N. of College Aves. 41°36′34″N 93°37′39″W | River Bend | Well-preserved parcel of Des Moines' largest 19th-century residential development, further noted for its period architectural styles and its locally unusual grid plat, with 59 contributing properties built 1886–1941. |
| 135 | Prospect Park Second Plat Historic District | Prospect Park Second Plat Historic District | April 23, 1998 (#98000375) | Roughly along the Des Moines River south to Franklin Ave., between 6th Ave. and 9th St. 41°36′46″N 93°37′40″W | River Bend | Middle- and upper-middle-class neighborhood with 56 contributing properties built 1886–1937, representing late-19th- and early-20th-century architectural styles, landscape architecture, and trends in residential real estate development. |
| 136 | Public Library of Des Moines | Public Library of Des Moines | July 25, 1977 (#77000550) | 100 Locust St. 41°35′16″N 93°37′08″W | Downtown | Public library built 1899–1903 in an exemplary mix of Beaux-Arts and Neo-Palladian architecture. Also a contributing property to the Civic Center Historic District. |
| 137 | Register and Tribune Building | Register and Tribune Building | June 21, 2016 (#16000385) | 715 Locust St. 41°35′12″N 93°37′38″W | Downtown | 1918 headquarters of Iowa's two leading newspapers, The Des Moines Register and the Des Moines Tribune. Also significant as one of Des Moines' largest employers and community promoters, and for its consistent Modern architecture by Proudfoot, Bird & Rawson from a 1948 addition to a 1961 recladding. |
| 138 | Anson O. Reynolds House | Anson O. Reynolds House | September 8, 1988 (#88001331) | 1022 26th St. 41°35′45″N 93°39′09″W | Drake | Circa-1890 house associated with Drake University's innovative financing through real estate sales. |
| 139 | Seth Richards Commercial Block | Seth Richards Commercial Block | March 11, 2005 (#01001460) | 300–310 Court Ave. 41°35′06″N 93°37′15″W | Downtown | Romanesque Revival warehouse (built in two phases 1889–1897) that embodies Court Avenue's redevelopment as a regional wholesaling district and the leading role of American Jews in the region's apparel wholesaling industry. |
| 140 | Riverview Park Plat Historic District | Riverview Park Plat Historic District | October 25, 1996 (#96001157) | Arlington Ave. between Franklin and 6th Aves. 41°36′44″N 93°37′26″W | River Bend | Upper-middle-class residential neighborhood with 32 contributing properties built 1886–1922, illustrating Des Moines' late-Victorian suburban development, stylistic influences, and landscape architecture. |
| 141 | Ralph Rollins House | Ralph Rollins House | November 14, 1978 (#78001255) | 2801 Fleur Dr. 41°33′36″N 93°38′39″W | Grays Lake | 1926 mansion which, along with the Salisbury House, comprise Iowa's foremost examples of the decade's large residences patterned after medieval English manors. |
| 142 | Ruan Center & Carriers Building | Ruan Center & Carriers Building | January 30, 2025 (#100011416) | 666 Grand Ave. & 601 Locust St. 41°35′14″N 93°37′33″W | Downtown | Built in 1975 and 1982. |
| 143 | Rumely–Des Moines Drug Company Building | Rumely–Des Moines Drug Company Building | November 16, 1989 (#89002008) | 110 SW. 4th St. 41°35′00″N 93°37′17″W | Downtown | 1903 warehouse acquired and expanded in 1911 by the Des Moines Drug Company, Iowa's leading drug wholesaler, active 1897–1970. |
| 144 | St. Ambrose Cathedral and Rectory | St. Ambrose Cathedral and Rectory | March 30, 1979 (#79000927) | 607 High St. 41°35′19″N 93°37′33″W | Downtown | Prominent Richardsonian Romanesque church built 1890–91 without interior columns, and a 1927 rectory. |
| 145 | St. Anthony's Church | St. Anthony's Church | July 20, 2021 (#100006734) | 15 Indianola Rd. 41°34′21″N 93°37′02″W | McKinley School/Columbus Park | |
| 146 | Saint John's Roman Catholic Church | Saint John's Roman Catholic Church | September 8, 1987 (#87001497) | 1915 University Ave. 41°36′03″N 93°38′37″W | King Irving | 1927 basilica church significant as one of Des Moines' best examples of Lombardy-style Romanesque Revival architecture and of early-20th-century period revival architecture in general. |
| 147 | St. Paul's Episcopal Church | St. Paul's Episcopal Church | March 31, 2010 (#10000129) | 815 High St. 41°35′17″N 93°37′45″W | Downtown | 1885 Gothic Revival church designed by Foster & Liebbe and 1953 parish house designed by Brooks & Borg; the last original church in a cluster of seven once dubbed Piety Hill. |
| 148 | Salisbury House | Salisbury House | July 20, 1977 (#77000551) | 4025 Tonawanda Dr. 41°34′46″N 93°40′17″W | Salisbury Oaks | Unusually authentic English-style mansion, cottage, and grounds built 1923–28 by the Armand Company for president Carl Weeks (1876–1962), a national influence in the cosmetics industry and fair trade laws. Now a museum. |
| 149 | Sargent's Garage | Sargent's Garage | October 22, 1998 (#98001276) | 510 College Ave. 41°36′27″N 93°37′31″W | River Bend | 1924 auto repair shop, a new specialty service and architectural form to emerge in the early 20th century, and a sign of North Des Moines' prosperity. |
| 150 | Savery Hotel | Savery Hotel | November 5, 1998 (#98001324) | 401 Locust St. 41°35′15″N 93°37′22″W | Downtown | 1919 hotel noted for its locally rare Colonial Revival architecture, importance to commercial travel and events, and use as a Women's Army Auxiliary Corps training center during World War II. |
| 151 | Julius Scheibe Cottage | Julius Scheibe Cottage | October 22, 1998 (#98001281) | 815 College Ave. 41°36′28″N 93°37′44″W | River Bend | 1898 cottage designed by George E. Hallett, exemplifying turn-of-the-20th-century trends in architectural style and housing density in what was then the suburb of North Des Moines. Also a contributing property to the West Ninth Streetcar Line Historic District. |
| 152 | Schmitt and Henry Manufacturing Company | Schmitt and Henry Manufacturing Company | March 17, 2010 (#10000078) | 309 SW 8th St. 41°34′49″N 93°37′30″W | Downtown | Factory complex of a major regional furniture producer based onsite 1902–1973, built in three stages 1901–1914 as Proudfoot & Bird's largest industrial commission, and constructed by a significant local contractor, the Capital City Brick and Pipe Company. |
| 153 | Mary A. and Caleb D. Scott House | Mary A. and Caleb D. Scott House | September 8, 1988 (#88001332) | 1014 26th St. 41°35′45″N 93°39′09″W | Drake | Circa-1889 house associated with Drake University's innovative financing through real estate sales. |
| 154 | Scottish Rite Consistory Building | Scottish Rite Consistory Building | February 9, 1983 (#83000399) | 519 Park St. 41°35′27″N 93°37′31″W | Downtown | Fraternal society clubhouse built 1926–27, noted for its Neoclassical architecture designed with Art Deco elements by Wetherell & Harrison. |
| 155 | Sherman Hill Historic District | Sherman Hill Historic District | January 25, 1979 (#79000926) | Roughly bounded by Woodland Ave., 19th, School, and 15th Sts.; also generally between 15th St., Woodland Ave., Martin Luther King Jr. Pkwy. and I-235; 41°35′27″N 93°38′27″W | Sherman Hill | Residential neighborhood characterized by late-19th-century single-family homes diversified by a variety of 20th-century multi-family dwellings, with 265 contributing properties built 1877–1961 in a succession of popular architectural styles. |
| 156 | Hoyt Sherman Place | Hoyt Sherman Place | September 19, 1977 (#77000552) | 1501 Woodland Ave. 41°35′20″N 93°38′18″W | Sherman Hill | Cultural center established in 1907 by the Des Moines Women's Club and grown over the years to integrate an 1877 mansion, 1907 gallery, and 1922 Mediterranean Revival auditorium. Also a contributing property to the Sherman Hill Historic District. |
| 157 | Lampson P. Sherman House | Lampson P. Sherman House | September 8, 1988 (#88001335) | 1052 26th St. 41°35′48″N 93°39′09″W | Drake | Circa-1888 house associated with Drake University's innovative financing through real estate sales. |
| 158 | John P. Simmons House | John P. Simmons House | November 1, 1988 (#88001339) | 1113 27th St. 41°35′56″N 93°39′11″W | Drake | 1894 house associated with Drake University's innovative financing through real estate sales. |
| 159 | Sixth and Forest Historic District | Sixth and Forest Historic District | October 25, 1996 (#96001156) | Northeastern and northwestern corners of the junction of 6th and Forest Aves. 41°36′15″N 93°37′33″W | River Bend | Des Moines' leading example of the first commercial districts to develop in what were then the city's suburbs, with six contributing properties built 1894–1924 that illustrate fine Victorian architecture and the particular investment appeal of North Des Moines. |
| 160 | David W. Smouse Opportunity School | David W. Smouse Opportunity School | October 24, 2002 (#02001251) | 2820 Center St. 41°35′28″N 93°39′19″W | Woodland Heights | Iowa's only school designed to provide community-based education to children with physical disabilities, built in 1931 with numerous adaptive features and fine Tudor Revival architecture by Proudfoot, Rawson, Souers & Thomas. |
| 161 | Southeast Water Trough | Southeast Water Trough | October 8, 1976 (#76000801) | 1000 Scott Ave. 41°34′59″N 93°36′04″W | East Village | 1906 National Humane Alliance fountain—a rare vestige of horse-drawn transportation infrastructure and a bygone locus of social exchange. |
| 162 | Southwest Fifth St. Bridge | Southwest Fifth St. Bridge | May 15, 1998 (#98000487) | SW 5th St. over the Raccoon River; 41°34′37″N 93°37′08″W | Downtown | One of Iowa's few surviving pin-connected Pratt truss bridges of three spans or more, built in 1898. Also noted for its rare urban setting and contentious siting and bidding processes. |
| 163 | Standard Glass and Paint Company Building | Standard Glass and Paint Company Building | December 6, 2004 (#04001323) | 112 10th St. 41°35′01″N 93°37′46″W | Downtown | 1913 warehouse associated with a major regional building material wholesaler active 1903–1979 and with the neighborhood's transition to tall commercial buildings. |
| 164 | Samuel A. and Margaret Stevenson House | Samuel A. and Margaret Stevenson House | January 3, 1985 (#85000008) | 2940 Cottage Grove Ave. 41°35′54″N 93°39′33″W | Drake | 1889 house significant as one of the best surviving examples of the Stick–Eastlake architecture once common in Des Moines' late-19th-century residential neighborhoods. |
| 165 | Thomas I. Stoner House | Thomas I. Stoner House | February 12, 1992 (#92000006) | 1030 56th St. 41°35′47″N 93°41′39″W | Waveland Woods | Highly intact example of Spanish eclectic architecture, built in 1931. |
| 166 | Dr. Richard and Paulina Stuart House | Dr. Richard and Paulina Stuart House | September 8, 1988 (#88001330) | 1060 25th St. 41°35′49″N 93°39′05″W | Drake | House built in the first half of the 1890s that illustrates Drake University's innovative financing through real estate sales. |
| 167 | Studebaker Corporation Branch Office Building | Studebaker Corporation Branch Office Building | December 15, 2015 (#15000895) | 1436–1442 Locust St. 41°35′03″N 93°38′10″W | Downtown | Prominent auto dealership and district headquarters within Des Moines' Auto Row, consisting of 1918 and 1922 buildings designed by Proudfoot, Bird & Rawson, and joined around 1948. |
| 168 | Sylvan Theater Historic District | Sylvan Theater Historic District | August 15, 1995 (#95000965) | In Greenwood Park on the western side of 45th St., 1 block south of its junction with Grand Ave. 41°34′52″N 93°40′49″W | Westwood | Des Moines' first outdoor theater, with three contributing properties built in 1931; noted for its association with the decade's outdoor theater movement and its collaborative landscape architecture. |
| 169 | Syndicate Block | Syndicate Block | October 1, 2001 (#01001059) | 501 E. Locust St. 41°35′22″N 93°36′39″W | East Village | One of the first commercial buildings in the East Village to employ Renaissance Revival architecture when it was built in 1883. Also a contributing property to the East Des Moines Commercial Historic District. |
| 170 | Taft–West Warehouse | Taft–West Warehouse | December 20, 2006 (#06001162) | 216–222 Court Ave. 41°35′06″N 93°37′12″W | Downtown | 1923 warehouse that exemplifies a former wholesaling district and portrays the local industry's adoption of Chicago School architecture and truck access. |
| 171 | Teachout Building | Teachout Building | April 29, 1999 (#99000491) | 500–502 E. Locust St. 41°35′24″N 93°36′40″W | East Village | One of the few Chicago school high-rises designed by Proudfoot, Bird & Rawson, built in 1912 by prominent businessman and politician H.E. Teachout (1846–1917) to promote commercial development of the East Village. Also a contributing property to the East Des Moines Commercial Historic District. |
| 172 | Terrace Hill | Terrace Hill | June 14, 1972 (#72000480) | 2300 Grand Ave. 41°35′00″N 93°38′57″W | | Exemplary Second Empire mansion built 1866–1868, serving as the official residence of the Governor of Iowa since 1976. A carriage house/ice house was added to the listing when it became a National Historic Landmark in 2003. |
| 173 | Theodore Roosevelt High School | Theodore Roosevelt High School | October 24, 2002 (#02001234) | 4419 Center St. 41°35′34″N 93°40′44″W | Waveland Park | 1922 high school exemplifying the design and proliferation of secondary schools in early-20th-century Des Moines, and superlative Tudor Revival architecture by Proudfoot, Bird & Rawson. |
| 174 | Trent–Beaver House | Trent–Beaver House | October 25, 1996 (#96001145) | 1802 6th Ave. 41°36′37″N 93°37′34″W | River Bend | 1917 house used as a chiropractic clinic 1923–1940, exemplifying Des Moines' single-family homes built by small development companies and the shift of professional services out of downtown along streetcar lines. |
| 175 | Trinity Methodist Episcopal Church | Trinity Methodist Episcopal Church | April 23, 1998 (#98000380) | 1548 8th St. 41°36′27″N 93°37′43″W | River Bend | 1911 church designed in Neoclassical style for a small lot by Proudfoot, Bird & Rawson, and retaining its original pipe organ from the Hinners Organ Company. |
| 176 | Susie P. Turner Double House | Susie P. Turner Double House | October 22, 1998 (#98001284) | 1420–1422 8th St. 41°36′17″N 93°37′42″W | River Bend | A locally early and architecturally distinguished example of a duplex, built in Prairie School style in 1914 with a detached garage. |
| 177 | U.S. Post Office | U.S. Post Office | November 19, 1974 (#74002323) | 111 Court Ave. 41°35′12″N 93°37′08″W | Downtown | Superlative Neoclassical post office built in 1908 and expanded in 1935. Also a contributing property to the Civic Center Historic District. |
| 178 | Mrs. Marian D. Vail-Prof. Charles Noyes Kinney House | | November 1, 1988 (#88001340) | 1056 26th St. 41°35′49″N 93°39′09″W | Drake | 1889 example of the houses built by Drake University for revenue; acquired in 1914 by longtime professor and state chemist Charles Kinney. Moved c. 2001. |
| 179 | Veneman's Bungalow Court Historic District | Veneman's Bungalow Court Historic District | November 21, 2000 (#00000929) | 1101–115 Droukas Ct., 1228 and 1232 E. 12th St. 41°36′04″N 93°36′19″W | Capitol Park | 11 bungalows flanking a central lawn, built to provide high-density rental housing 1924–1926; a late date attesting to the continued popularity of bungalows after World War I. |
| 180 | Henry Wallace House | Henry Wallace House | May 14, 1993 (#93000412) | 756 16th St. 41°35′29″N 93°38′21″W | Sherman Hill | Home beginning in 1892 for agricultural publisher and advocate Henry Wallace (1836–1916). Also a contributing property to the Sherman Hill Historic District. Now a museum. |
| 181 | Walnut Tire and Battery Co.-Globe Publishing Company Building | Walnut Tire and Battery Co.-Globe Publishing Company Building | January 17, 2017 (#100000489) | 1417–1425 Walnut St. 41°35′02″N 93°38′08″W | Downtown | Rare surviving example of a two-story, multi-tenant building from Des Moines' auto sales and service district during the interwar period; built in 1925 and expanded in 1928. |
| 182 | Warfield, Pratt and Howell Company Warehouse | Warfield, Pratt and Howell Company Warehouse | May 15, 1985 (#85001056) | 100 W. Court Ave. 41°35′08″N 93°37′06″W | Downtown | Prominent 1901 warehouse expanded in 1909, exhibiting turn-of-the-20th-century warehouse construction. |
| 183 | Washington and Elizabeth Miller Tract–Center-Soll Community Historic District | | January 17, 2017 (#100000490) | Roughly 35th to 38th Sts. between 3500–3607 Grand Ave. to Center St. 41°35′22″N 93°40′00″W | North of Grand | Middle-class neighborhood developed by three generations of the tract's former farmers and a nationally recognized neighborhood organization, with 297 contributing properties largely built 1895–early 1920s. |
| 184 | Charles H. and Lena May Weitz House | Charles H. and Lena May Weitz House | October 22, 1998 (#98001282) | 1424 5th Ave. 41°36′16″N 93°37′30″W | River Bend | 1891 Colonial Revival house and backyard workshop of Charles H. Weitz (1865–1937), second-generation proprietor of an important local contracting firm that popularized this architectural style in North Des Moines. |
| 185 | West Chester | West Chester | January 19, 1984 (#84001304) | 3520 Grand Ave. 41°35′01″N 93°39′53″W | Greenwood | 1901 mansion noted as an outstanding example of Jacobethan architecture in Des Moines. |
| 186 | West Ninth Streetcar Line Historic District | West Ninth Streetcar Line Historic District | April 23, 1998 (#98000377) | W. 9th St. from University Ave. to Hickman Rd. 41°36′28″N 93°37′46″W | River Bend | Mile-long straightaway illustrating the impact of streetcar transportation in North Des Moines c. 1883 to 1936, with 99 contributing properties in a variety of architectural styles. |
| 187 | Wherry Block | Wherry Block | October 22, 1998 (#98001283) | 1600–1602 6th Ave. 41°36′28″N 93°37′34″W | River Bend | Late Victorian commercial block built by S.C. Wherry in 1887, inaugurating one of two commercial districts in what was then the suburb of North Des Moines. |
| 188 | Woodland Place Historic District | Woodland Place Historic District | November 21, 2000 (#00000927) | 25th to 27th St. to Woodland Ave. 41°35′24″N 93°39′08″W | Woodland Heights | Architecturally consistent neighborhood of working class homes with 204 contributing properties largely built 1910–1925, representing the city's rapid westward residential expansion by individual developers. |
| 189 | Youngerman Block | Youngerman Block | June 10, 2009 (#09000405) | 206–208 4th St. 41°35′07″N 93°37′19″W | Downtown | 1876 faux-stone Italianate building designed by William Foster and built by local contractor Conrad Youngerman; given an exotic Art Deco storefront in 1935. |
| 190 | Younker Brothers Department Store | Younker Brothers Department Store | March 17, 2010 (#10000079) | 713 Walnut St. 41°35′09″N 93°37′36″W | Downtown | 1908 building incorporated into Des Moines' leading downtown department store in 1924. Boundary adjusted following the loss of the original 1899 building and 1924 connective structure to a 2014 fire. |

== Former listings ==
| | Name on the Register | Image | Date listed | Date removed | Location | City or town | Description |
|---|---|---|---|---|---|---|---|
| 1 | Bankers Trust Building | Bankers Trust Building | April 22, 1976 (#76000798) | November 5, 1979 | 605 Locust St. | Downtown | Removed due to a procedural error. Demolished in 1980. |
| 2 | Burnstein-Malin Grocery | Burnstein-Malin Grocery | October 22, 1998 (#98001277) | March 7, 2019 | 1241 6th Ave. | River Bend | 1923 grocery store established in an existing single-family house and expanded with a traditional storefront in 1940; exemplifying the small businesses that once peppered residential neighborhoods. Demolished c. 2013. |
| 3 | Des Moines Rapid Transit Company Carbarn | | September 8, 1978 (#78001249) | November 30, 1983 | 24th and Ingersoll Ave. | Woodland Heights | Demolished in July 1983. |

== See also ==
- List of National Historic Landmarks in Iowa
- National Register of Historic Places listings in Iowa
