= Sixth and Forest Historic District =

Historic district in Iowa, United States

- U.S. National Register of Historic Places
- U.S. Historic district
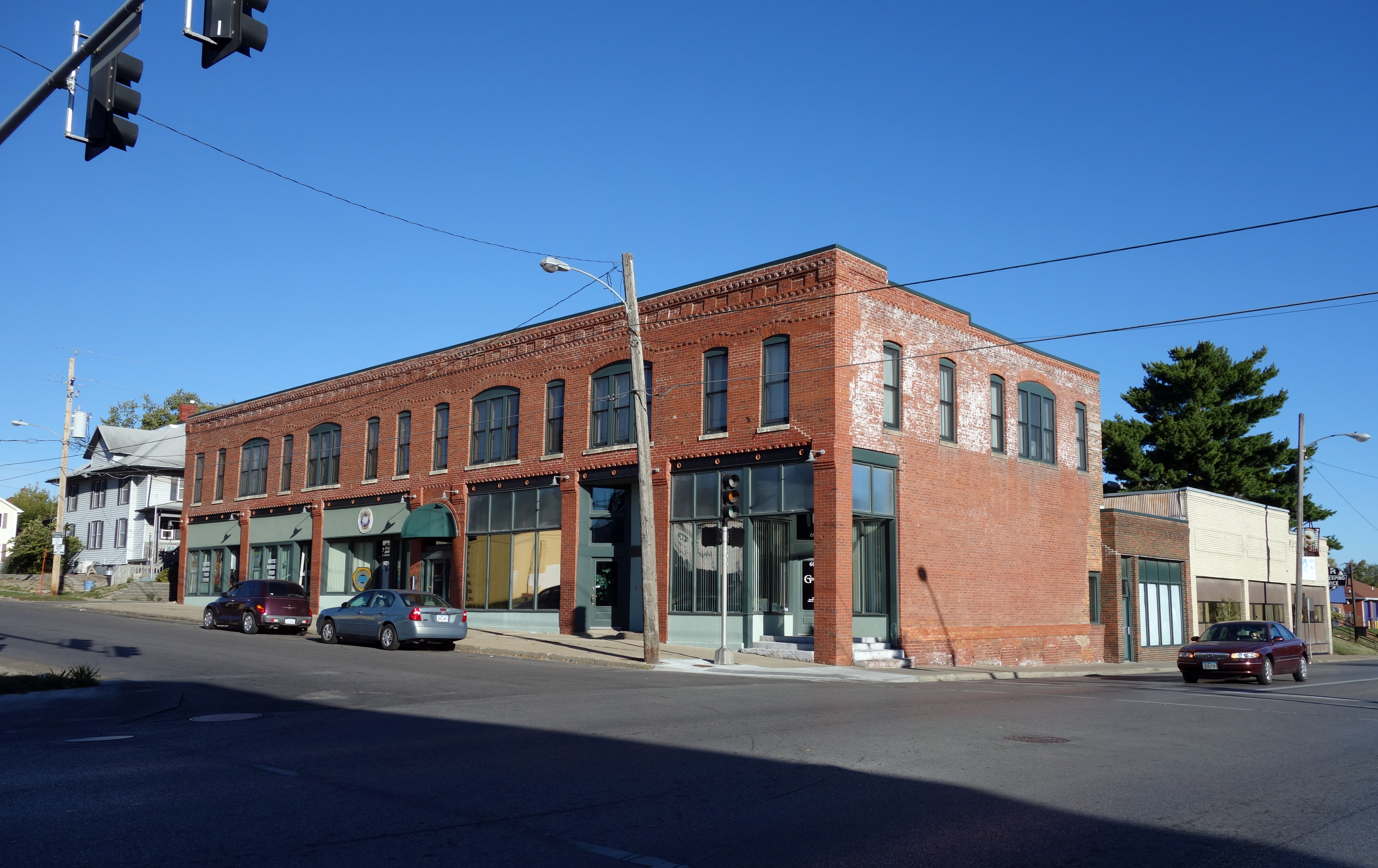

- Location within Iowa Location within the United States
- Location: Northeastern and northwestern corners of the junction of 6th and Forest Aves. Des Moines, Iowa
- Coordinates: 41°36′17″N 93°37′32″W
- Area: Less than one acre
- Architectural style: Early Commercial; Romanesque Revival
- MPS: Towards a Greater Des Moines MPS
- NRHP reference No.: 96001156
- Added to NRHP: October 25, 1996

The Sixth and Forest Historic District is located in Des Moines, Iowa, United States. It is a Victorian era suburban commercial district on the northeastern and northwestern corners of the junction of 6th and Forest Avenues, and originally contained six buildings. The buildings on the northeast corner have subsequently been torn down. The historic district has been listed on the National Register of Historic Places since 1996. It is a part of the Towards a Greater Des Moines MPS.

== History ==
The commercial district at the intersection of Sixth and Forest Avenues is the largest suburban commercial node in the Des Moines area during the Victorian era. It was located in the largest of the city's late-19th- and early-20th-century suburbs, North Des Moines.

Land use in the district is clearly defined in the area. All of the residential units are located on the second floor of the buildings with commercial stores on the first floor. There are no single-family houses in the district. Typical of Victorian districts is the presence of a lodge hall. An Odd Fellows hall was located at 1401 Sixth Avenue and is no longer in existence. The first floor of the building was rented out for commercial use while the second floor was used by the fraternal organization.

Sixth Avenue was a major street car line in the city, and Forest Avenue was a major east-west route during the Victorian era. This contributed to the economic success of the area while it was being developed. Transportation corridors also encouraged higher population density. Multi-family dwellings were built along Forest Avenue and several churches were established in the area. North Park Congregational Church, which no longer exists, was on the southwest corner of Sixth and Forest Avenues.

== Architecture ==
The Sixth and Forest Historic District contains both sophisticated and more modest expressions of Victorian commercial architecture in Des Moines. The quality of building materials in this district is generally superior to that of other suburban commercial nodes in the city from the same era. A couple of distinguishing features of the district is the use of polychrome brick and a variety of brick textures used in the construction of several of the buildings. The Orvis Block, which was an example of this, is no longer in existence. The Temple Block on the northwest corner of the intersection is a richly embellished two-story structure. It is composed of five commercial spaces on its first floor and stretches along a half-city block. The extended facade line of the building is unified by symmetrically placed bays, an undulating rhythm of its second floor belt course and a dentils along the cornice. The round arch above the entrance to the residential space in the Temple Block suggests the Romanesque Revival style. The Odd Fellows Hall, although a large two-story structure, was an example of a more modest use of architectural detailing. The small, single-story commercial building next door to it on Sixth Avenue was similar in its architectural details.
