= David W. Smouse Opportunity School =

- U.S. National Register of Historic Places
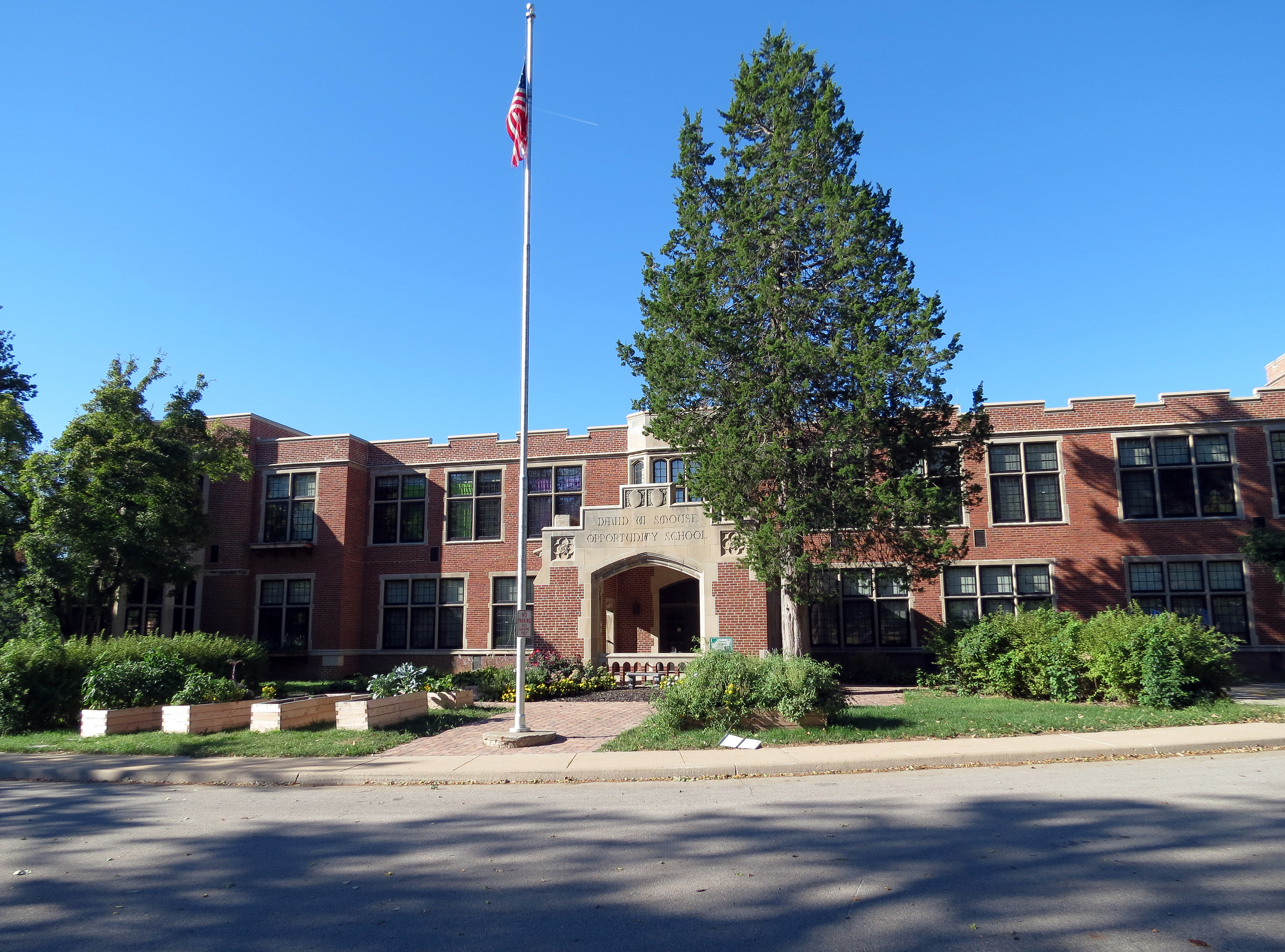

- Location within Iowa Location within the United States
- Location: 2820 Center St. Des Moines, Iowa
- Coordinates: 41°35′28″N 93°39′19″W
- Area: 4 acres (1.6 ha)
- Built: 1931
- Architect: Proudfoot, Rawson, Souers & Thomas
- Architectural style: Tudor Revival
- MPS: Public Schools for Iowa: Growth and Change MPS
- NRHP reference No.: 02001251
- Added to NRHP: October 24, 2002

The David W. Smouse Opportunity School is a historical building located in Des Moines, Iowa, United States. The building was designed by the Des Moines architectural firm of Proudfoot, Rawson, Souers & Thomas in the Tudor Revival style. The school opened in 1931 and served the educational needs of 165 students with physical disabilities who were unable to attend a regular public school. It was the only school in Iowa that was built to desegregate handicapped children, who were generally institutionalized in isolation. The facility was designed for their individual needs. The blackboards were tilted to prevent glare for the visually impaired, and rooms were designed to carry sound vibrations for the hearing impaired students. Large windows and three courtyards provided fresh air. One of the courtyards had a fountain. The restrooms were adapted, temperature controls in each classroom, and a rooftop playground was included in the building's design. A swimming pool was added in 1955. Financial gifts were used to purchase works of art throughout the building. Imported ceramic tiles, wrought iron signs, working fireplaces and decorative light fixtures also adorned the facility. The school was listed on the National Register of Historic Places in 2002.
