= Rees Gabriel House =

Historic house in Iowa, United States

- U.S. National Register of Historic Places
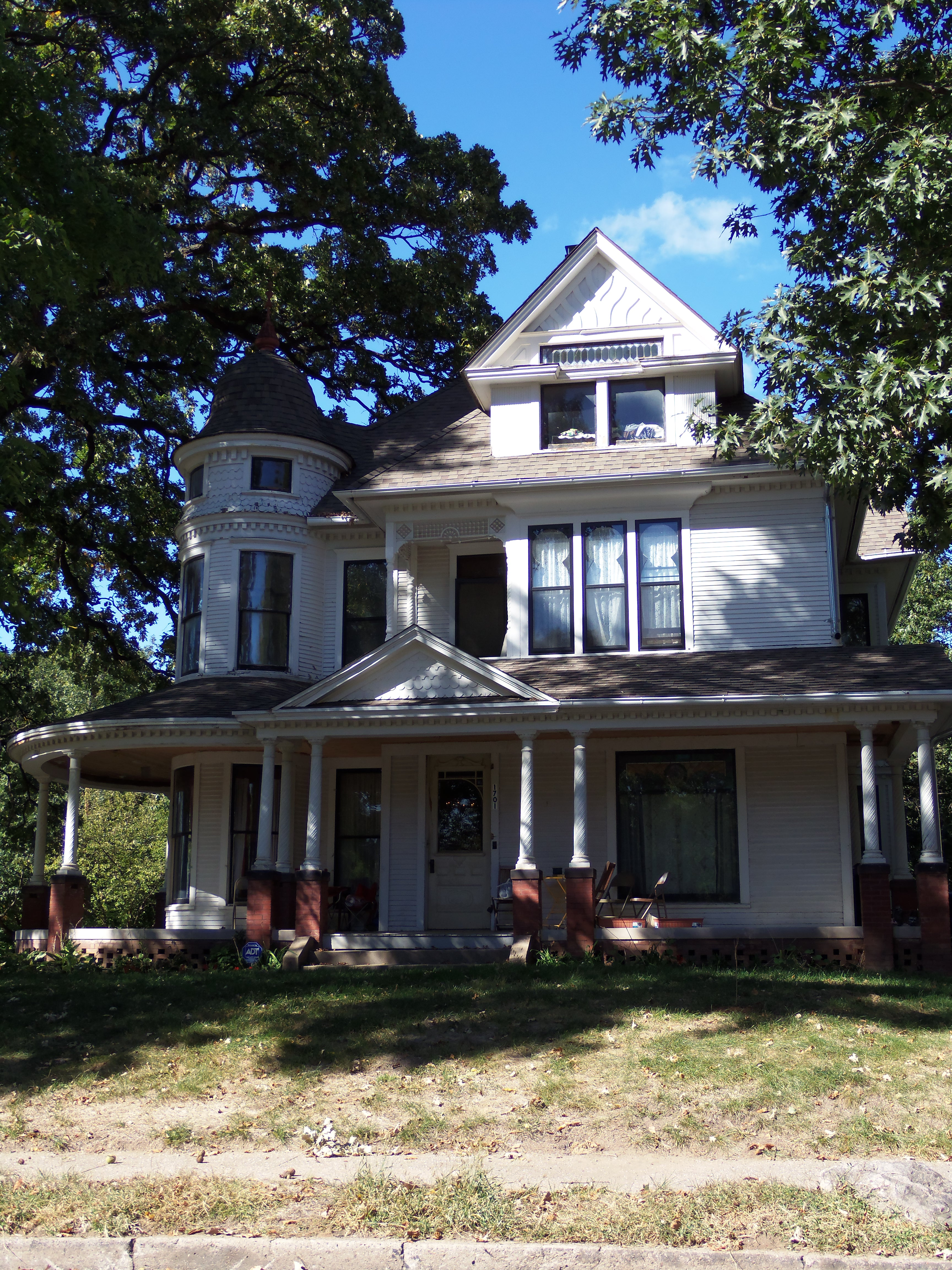

- Location within Iowa Location within the United States
- Location: 1701 Pennsylvania Ave. Des Moines, Iowa
- Coordinates: 41°36′33.4″N 93°36′33.8″W
- Area: less than one acre
- Built: 1890
- Built by: Rees Gabriel
- Architect: C.E. Eastman and Co.
- Architectural style: Queen Anne
- NRHP reference No.: 78001250
- Added to NRHP: December 21, 1978

The Rees Gabriel House is a historic building located in Des Moines, Iowa, United States. Gabriel was a dealer in building supplies. The basic designs for this house were drawn by C.E. Eastman and Co. and modified by Gabriel himself. The primary modifications include an extension of the turret to include an observation room in the attic, and several changes to the shape of the windows. The house is considered a good and well preserved example of the Queen Anne style. The 2½-story frame structure features an irregular plan, a hipped roof with intersecting gables and dormers, a round corner tower with a bell-shaped roof, and several porches. The house was listed on the National Register of Historic Places in 1978.
