= Seth Richards Commercial Block =

- U.S. National Register of Historic Places
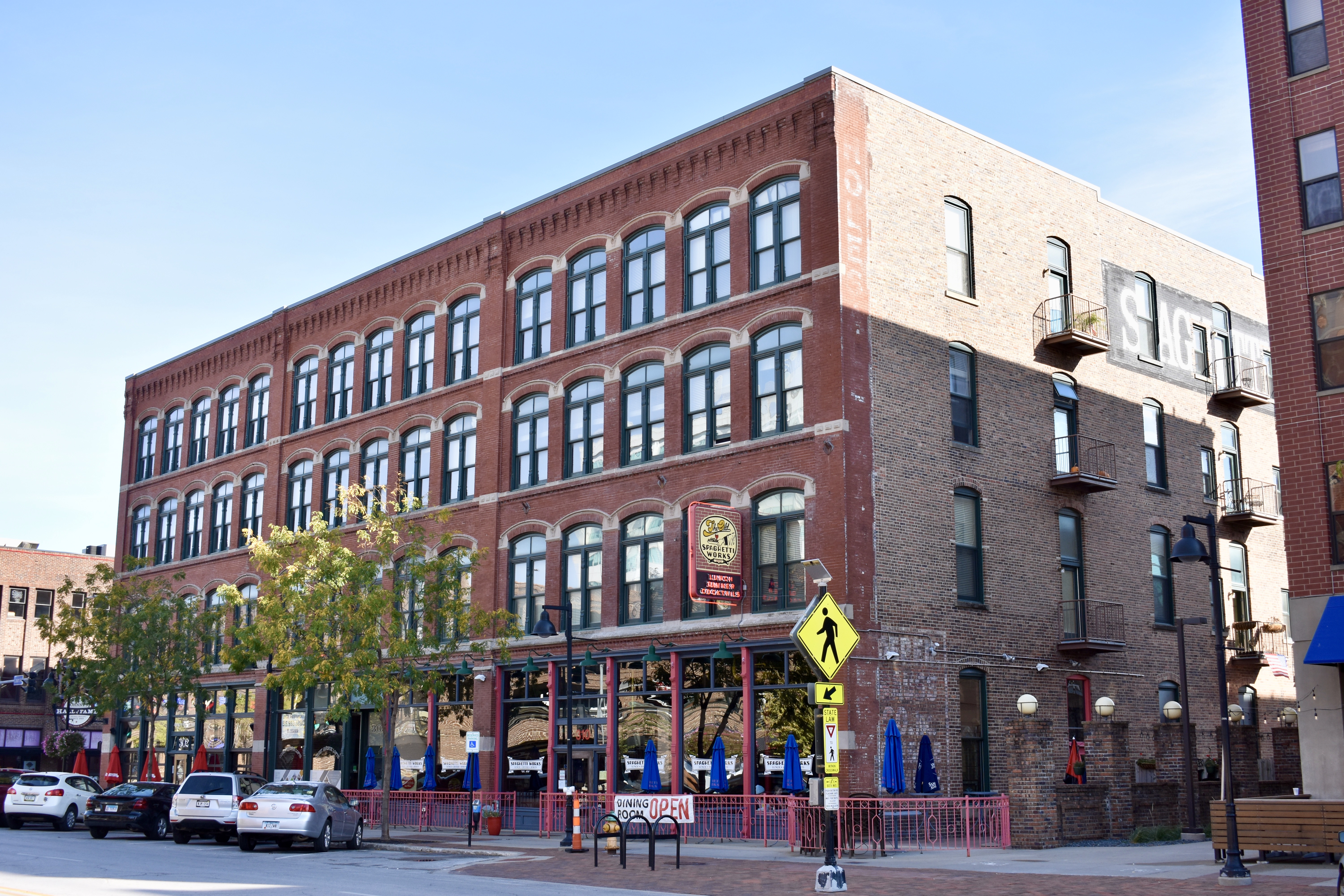

- Location within Iowa Location within the United States
- Location: 300-310 Court Avenue; Des Moines, Iowa
- Coordinates: 41°35′05.8″N 93°37′14.3″W
- Area: less than one acre
- Built: 1890, 1897
- Architectural style: Romanesque
- NRHP reference No.: 01001460
- Added to NRHP: March 11, 2005

The Seth Richards Commercial Block, also known as the Lederer-Strauss Building, is a historic building located in downtown Des Moines, Iowa, United States. Its construction represents the transition of Court Avenue from a retail center to the city's wholesale district.

Seth Richards had acquired the property that had been the location of several business houses. One of the lots had been owned by the Independent Order of Odd Fellows. The four-story brick Romanesque Revival building was constructed in two parts. The commercial blocks at 300-302 and 304-306 were completed and occupied in 1890, and 308-310 was completed and occupied by 1897.

Various wholesale clothing firms occupied the various blocks, but by 1920 Lederer, Strauss & Co., Inc., a millinery fabricator and wholesaler, occupied the entire building. The family-run business was sold in 1944 to the Hiersteiners, who incorporated the business as the Landsco Millinery Co. The business was scaled back, and they occupied less of the block, which was filled with other wholesalers by the mid-1950s. In 1957 the Landsco Millinery Co. was liquidated.

The building has been converted for other retail uses in the Court Avenue Entertainment District after this area ceased being a wholesale center. It was listed on the National Register of Historic Places in 2005.
