= Des Moines Western Railway Freight House =

- U.S. National Register of Historic Places
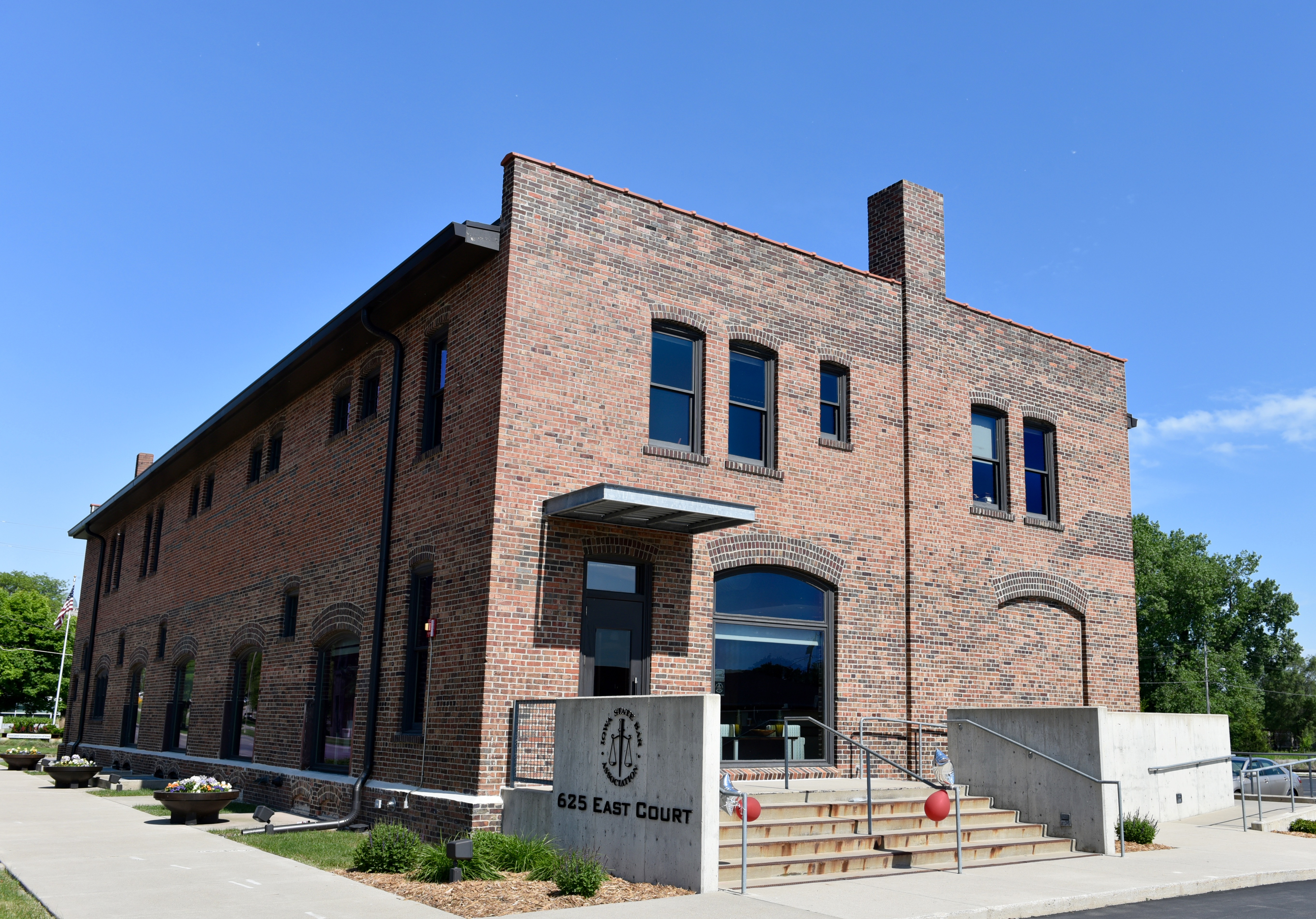

- Location within Iowa Location within the United States
- Location: 625 E. Court Ave. Des Moines, Iowa
- Coordinates: 41°35′15.5″N 93°36′28.2″W
- Area: less than one acre
- Built: 1903
- Built by: William H. Brererton
- MPS: Advent & Development of Railroads in Iowa MPS
- NRHP reference No.: 08000682
- Added to NRHP: July 10, 2008

The Des Moines Western Railway Freight House, also known as the Des Moines, Iowa Falls & Northern Railroad Freight House, is a historic building located in Des Moines, Iowa, United States. Built between 1902 and 1903 by local contractor William H. Brererton, this two-story brick building features a low-pitched, side gable roof. It was built as a railroad freight house for F.M. Hubbell and the Des Moines Western Railway, which was an attempt to link the city and points west, but it never made it beyond the city limits. It is now a rare example of a once common building type in the city. The building was leased to the Des Moines, Iowa Falls, and Northern Railroad (DMIF&N), another Hubbell venture. An interurban line, the Fort Dodge, Des Moines & Southern Railroad (FtDDM&S), acquired the DMIF&N and continued to use this freight house for that purpose as they carried a high volume of freight. The building has been remodeled three times. The first was when part of it was converted by the FtDDM&S into an interurban passenger depot in 1933. The second time was when it was converted into a restaurant in the 1980s. The third time was its conversion into an office building, which is what it is today. The building was listed on the National Register of Historic Places in 2008.
