= Mrs. Marian D. Vail-Prof. Charles Noyes Kinney House =

Historic house in Iowa, United States

- U.S. National Register of Historic Places
- Location within Iowa Location within the United States
- Location: 1318 27th St. Des Moines, Iowa
- Coordinates: 41°35′49″N 93°39′08.9″W
- Area: less than one acre
- Built: 1889
- Architectural style: Victorian
- MPS: Drake University and Related Properties in Des Moines, Iowa, 1881--1918 MPS
- NRHP reference No.: 88001340
- Added to NRHP: November 1, 1988

The Mrs. Marian D. Vail-Prof. Charles Noyes Kinney House is a historic building located in Des Moines, Iowa, United States. This 2½-story frame dwelling follows an irregular plan and features a truncated hipped roof, various gables, a shed-roofed front porch with turned columns, fishscale shingles, and reeded panels along the gable ends. The property on which it stands is one of ten plats that were owned by Drake University. The house's significance is attributed to the effect of the University's innovative financing techniques upon the settlement of the area around the campus. Marian Vail acquired the property in 1884, and the house was built in 1889. Her daughter Jennie was a Drake student at that time. Charles Noyes Kinney, who bought the house in 1914, taught chemistry at the University for 30 years and served as the State Chemist for around 15 years. The house was listed on the National Register of Historic Places in 1988.

By the time of its historical nomination, it had lost its residential location and was surrounded by University buildings. It has subsequently been moved to 1056 26th Street, which is still part of the ten original plats of land laid out by the University Land Company.
