= George B. Peak House =

Historic house in Iowa, United States

- U.S. National Register of Historic Places
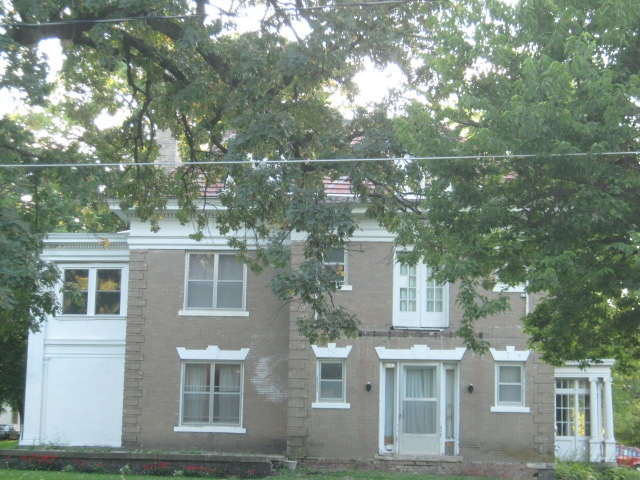

- Location within Iowa Location within the United States
- Location: 1080 22nd St. Des Moines, Iowa
- Coordinates: 41°35′52.4″N 93°38′49.8″W
- Area: less than one acre
- Built: 1900
- Architectural style: Colonial Revival
- NRHP reference No.: 78001254
- Added to NRHP: November 14, 1978

The George B. Peak House, also known as New Life Eternity House, is a historic building located in Des Moines, Iowa, United States. It is a 2½-story brick dwelling that features a hipped roof with a flat deck, pedimented dormers, and a portico with freestanding columns. It was built for George M. Peak who came to Des Moines in 1888 from Kentucky. He worked as the local manager of the Equitable Life Assurance Society of the U.S. before he organized the Central Life Assurance Society of the U.S. in 1896. He served as president of the later until his death. He also promoted the Insurance Exchange building in Des Moines, and advocated for the construction of Keosauqua Way. After Peak died in 1923 the house was acquired for use as a fraternity and then a sorority house for Drake University. It has since been converted into a multi-family dwelling. The house was listed on the National Register of Historic Places in 1978.
