= Grocers Wholesale Company Building =

- U.S. National Register of Historic Places
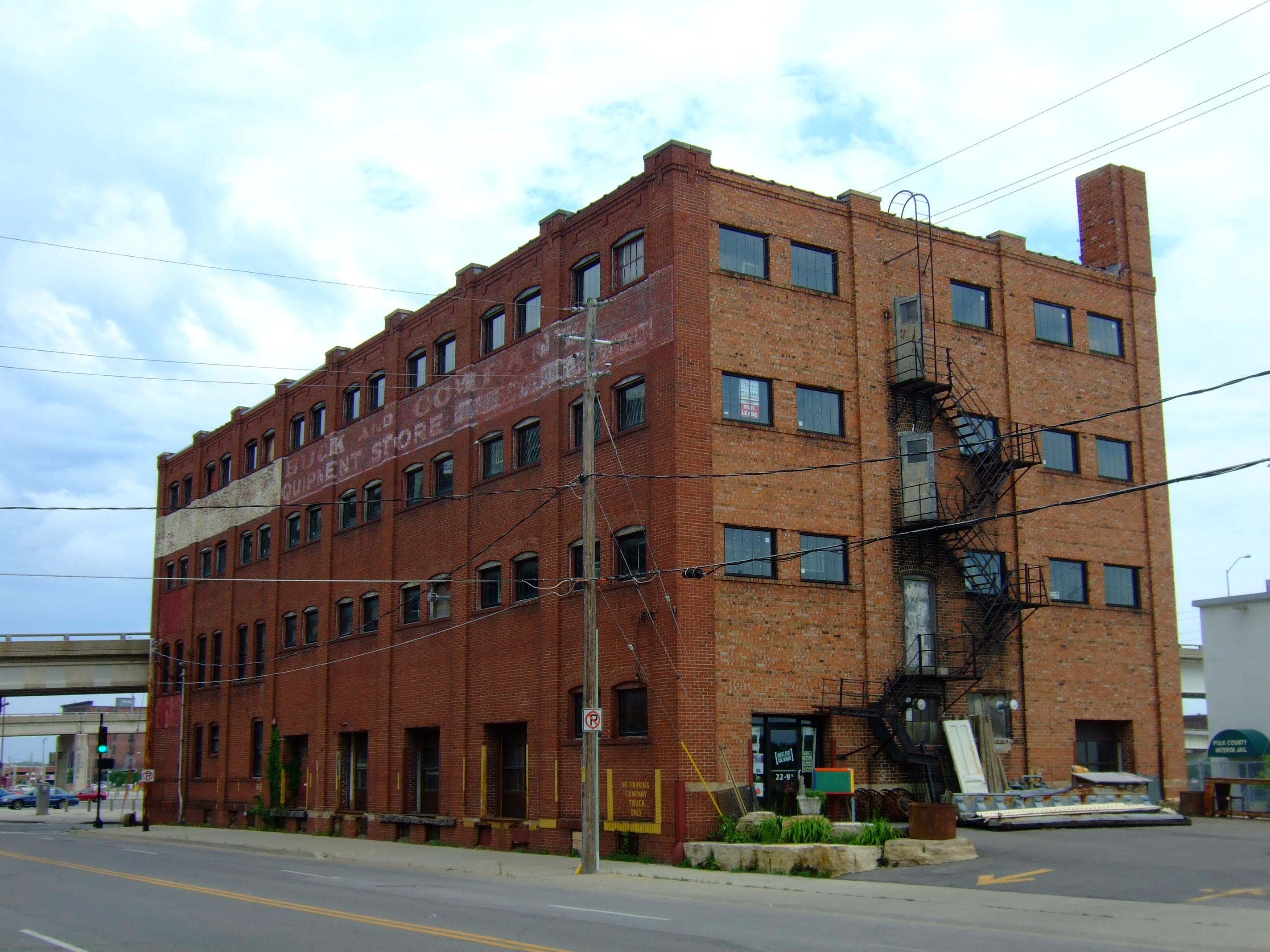

- Location within Iowa Location within the United States
- Location: 22 W. 9th St. Des Moines, Iowa
- Coordinates: 41°34′58.9″N 93°37′40.6″W
- Area: less than one acre
- Built: 1916
- Architect: Ralph Edmund Sawyer; Charles Albert Watrous
- Architectural style: Early Commercial
- NRHP reference No.: 08000330
- Added to NRHP: April 25, 2008

The Grocers Wholesale Company Building, also known as the Sears and Roebuck Farm Store, is a historic building located in Des Moines, Iowa, United States. Completed in 1916, this was the first of four warehouses built and owned by Iowa's only and most successful statewide cooperative grocery warehouse. It is possible that it was the first statewide organization of this kind in the country. The cooperative allowed independent grocers to compete against chain stores and survive wholesale grocers' surcharges. They leased their first warehouse after they organized in 1912. Each successive time the cooperative built a new warehouse it was larger and technologically more advanced than the previous one. This particular cooperative grew to include parts of four states: Iowa, southern Minnesota, northern Missouri and eastern Nebraska. They built their second warehouse in 1930 and moved out of this facility. They continued to own this building until 1968, and they leased it out to other firms. The Sears Farm Equipment Store began to occupy the building in 1937 and continued here until 1959. The cooperative became the Associated Grocers of Iowa in the late 1950s, and it continued in existence until 1985. The building was listed on the National Register of Historic Places in 2008.
