= Linden Heights Historic District =

Historic district in Iowa, United States

- U.S. National Register of Historic Places
- U.S. Historic district
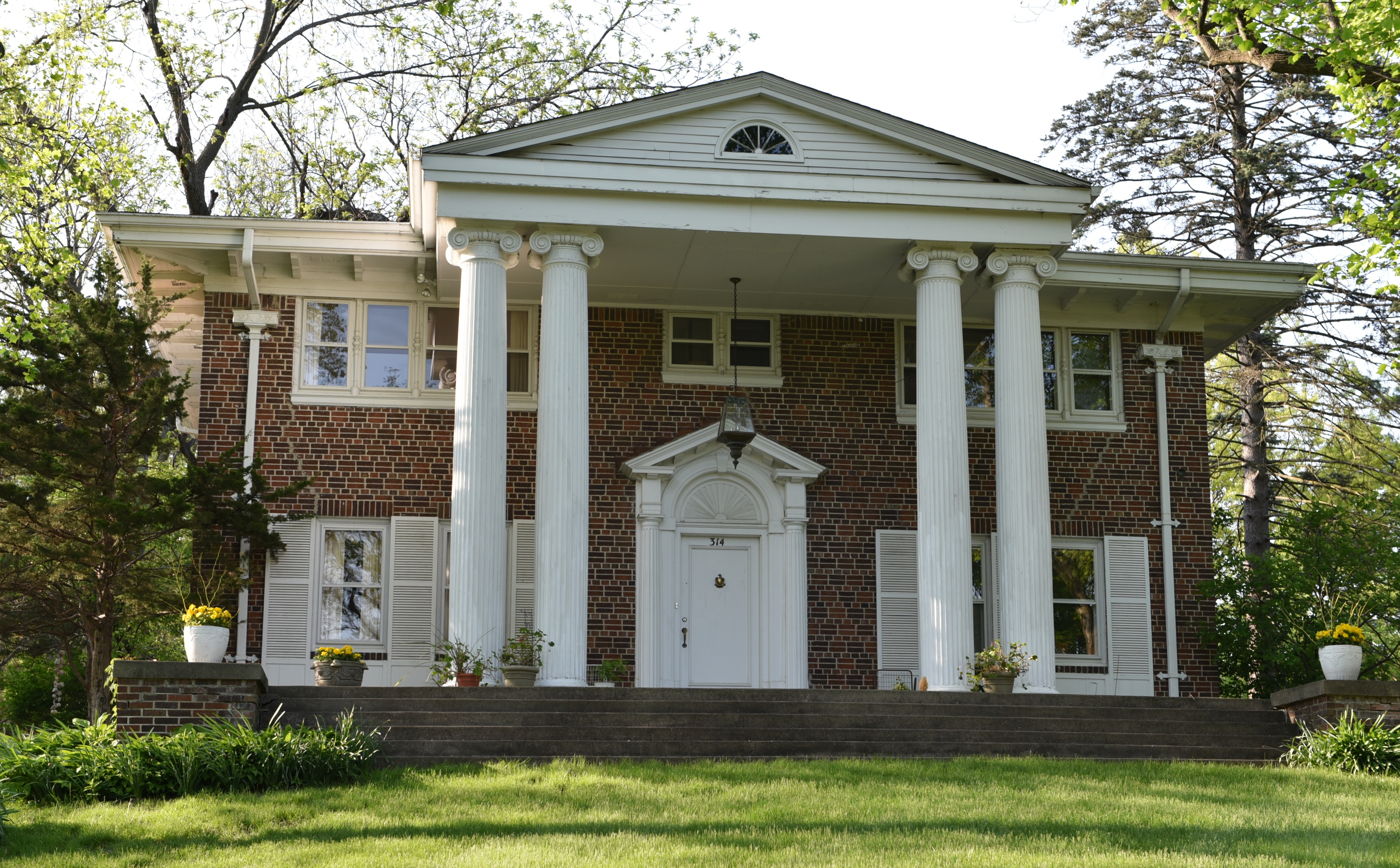

- Location within Iowa Location within the United States
- Location: Foster Dr., Glenview Dr., Woodlawn, and Park Hill Dr. west of SW. 42nd St. Des Moines, Iowa
- Coordinates: 41°34′25″N 93°40′35″W
- NRHP reference No.: 03001262
- Added to NRHP: December 10, 2003

The Linden Heights Historic District is located on the west side Des Moines, Iowa, United States. The district exemplifies the residential styles that were popular in Des Moines from 1912 to 1956. It was also significant in the development of the western part of the city south of Grand Avenue, which is a major east–west thoroughfare. It has been listed on the National Register of Historic Places since 2003.
