= Wherry Block =

- U.S. National Register of Historic Places
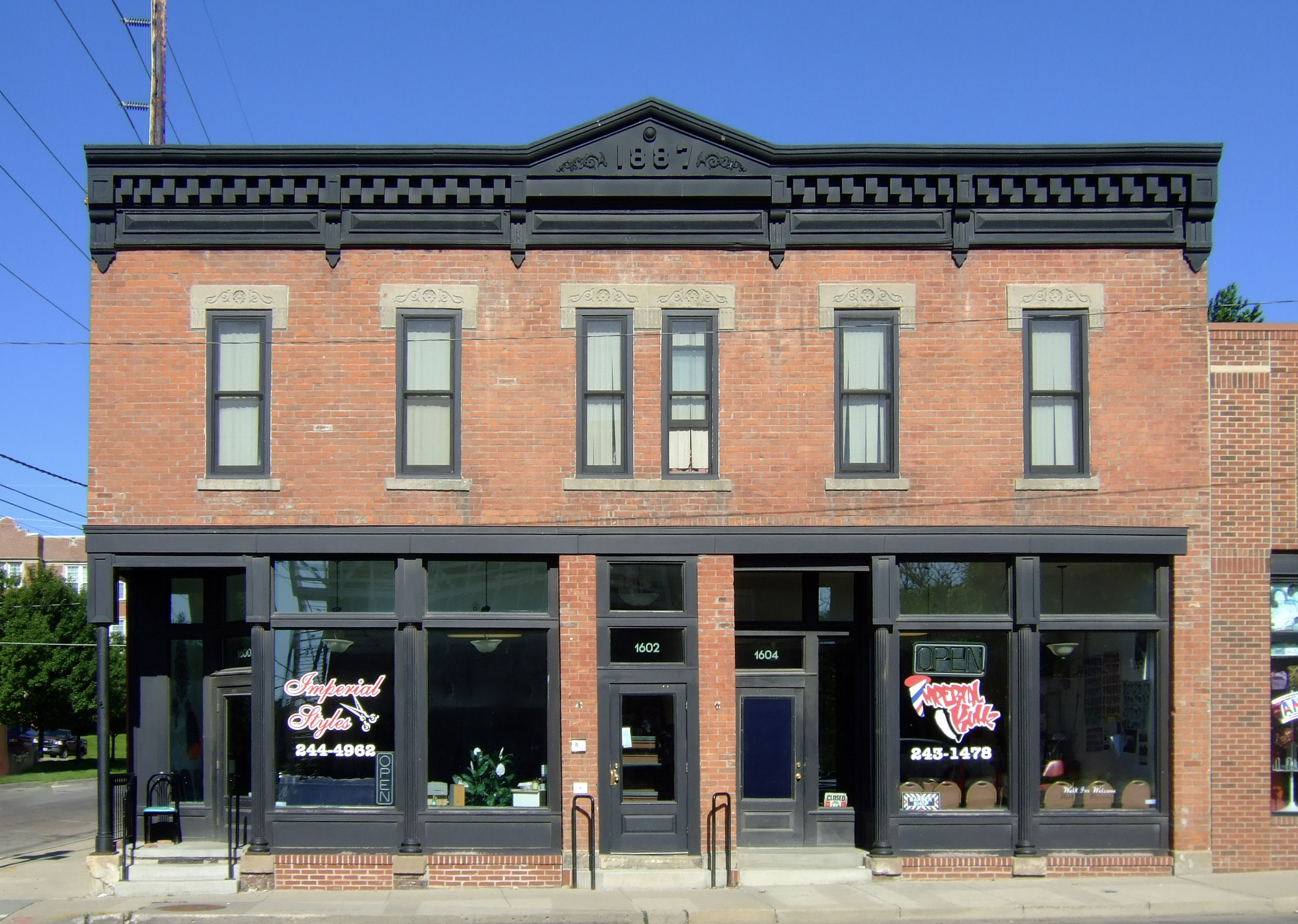

- Location within Iowa Location within the United States
- Location: 1600–1602 6th Ave. Des Moines, Iowa
- Coordinates: 41°36′28.1″N 93°37′33.7″W
- Area: less than one acre
- Built: 1887
- Built by: S.C. Wherry
- Architectural style: Late Victorian
- NRHP reference No.: 98001283
- Added to NRHP: October 22, 1998

The Wherry Block, also known as Wherry's Hall, Scruby Brothers Grocery, and Scruby's Grocery Store, is a historic building located in Des Moines, Iowa, United States.

== History ==
The building was constructed in 1887 in what was then the suburb of North Des Moines by S.C. Wherry, a local contractor-builder. He built it as an investment and an income-producing property. It was the first of the commercial buildings built at this intersection, which was one of two commercial areas in North Des Moines. The two-story brick structure reflects the styling of the Late Victorian era with cast stone trim work, window hood molds on the second floor, and a pressed metal cornice. The commercial space on the main level has two storefronts, and four apartment units on the second floor. It was listed on the National Register of Historic Places in 1998. In 2005 the building was extensively renovated. A new building was constructed to the north of the old building. Its architectural style complements the older structure.
