= Argonne Building =

- U.S. National Register of Historic Places
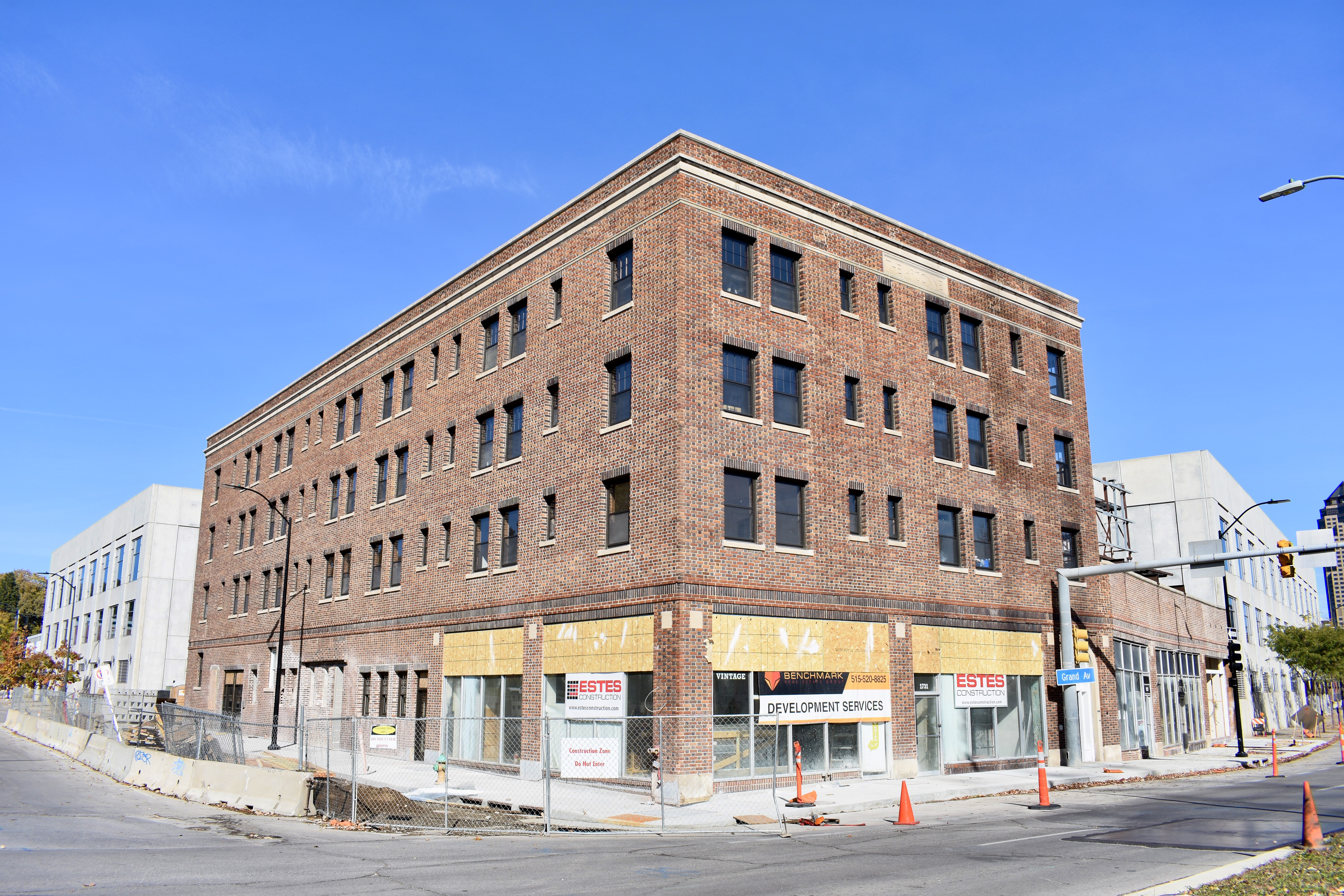

- Location within Iowa Location within the United States
- Location: 723 Grand Ave. (1723-1733 Grand Ave., plus 515 18th St.); Des Moines, Iowa
- Coordinates: 41°35′5.1″N 93°38′27.5″W
- Area: less than one acre
- Built: 1919
- NRHP reference No.: 100005608
- Added to NRHP: September 24, 2020

The Argonne Building is a historic building located in Des Moines, Iowa, United States. It was built in 1919 and it was used as a showroom for the Ford automobile plant that was located across the street and for employee housing. In later years it served as a long-term hotel and as an apartment building for low-income renters. There are plans to convert most of the building into market-rate apartments and to maintain the commercial space on the main level. The building was listed on the National Register of Historic Places in 2020.
