= L. Harbach and Sons Furniture Warehouse and Factory Complex =

- U.S. National Register of Historic Places
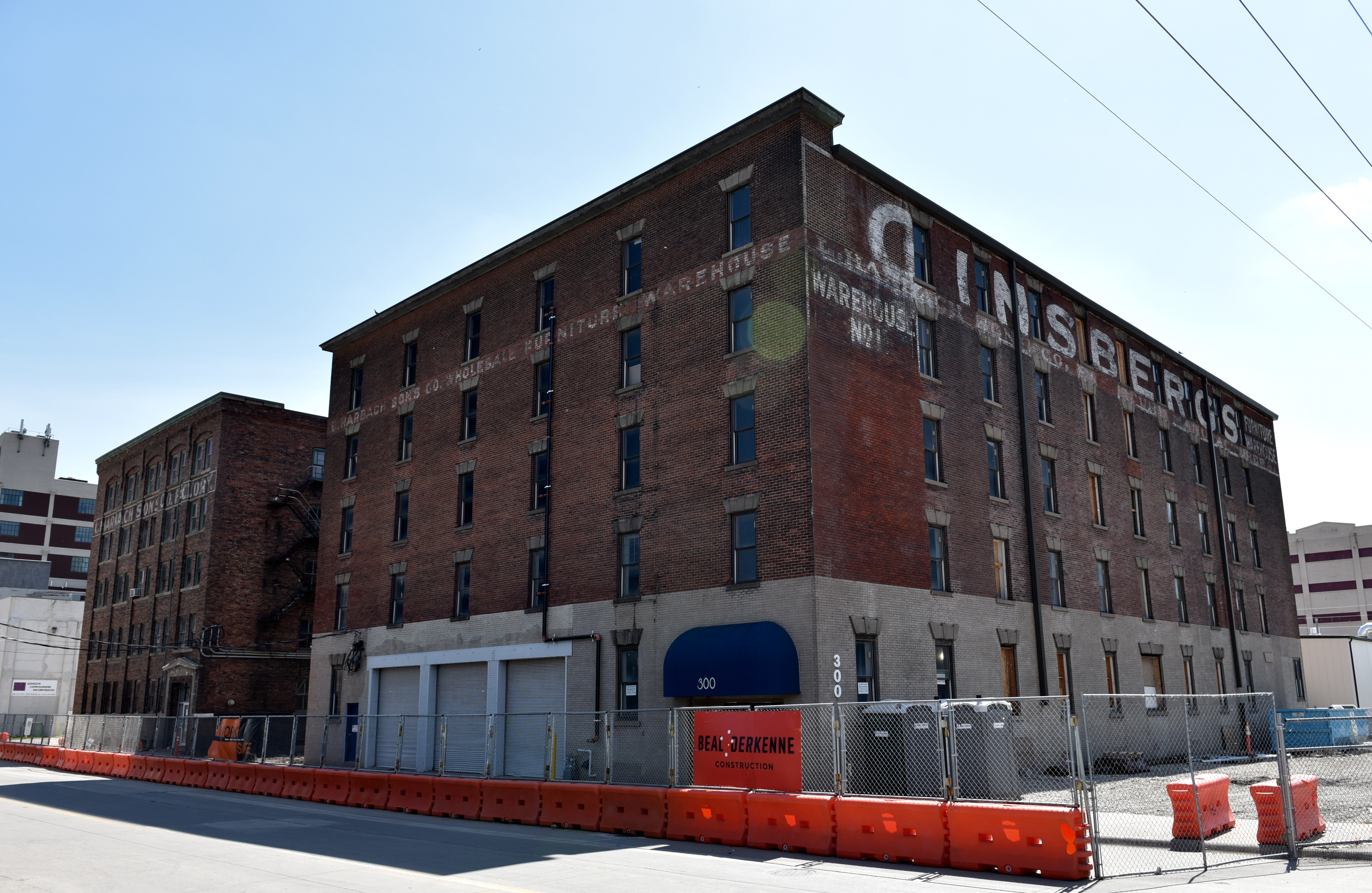

- Location within Iowa Location within the United States
- Location: 300–316 SW. 5th St., Des Moines, Iowa
- Coordinates: 41°34′51.9″N 93°37′18.8″W
- Area: less than one acre
- Built: 1906
- Architectural style: Late 19th and 20th Century Revivals
- NRHP reference No.: 15000918
- Added to NRHP: December 21, 2015

The L. Harbach and Sons Furniture Warehouse and Factory Complex, also known as the Way-Helms Co. & Red Cross Mattress, L. Ginsberg & Sons wholesale furniture warehouse, and the A.A. Schneiderhahn electronic appliances warehouse, is a historic building located in Des Moines, Iowa, United States. This is actually two adjacent buildings completed in 1906. Their significance is their successive ownership by three prominent furniture retailers/wholesalers. L. Harbach & Sons Co. was one of Iowa's largest furniture wholesalers, and they manufactured furniture in Des Moines for more than seventy years. The company was established in 1856 by Louis Harbach, Sr. Louis had emigrated from Germany in 1850 at the age of 12. A catalog of their furniture is available at the National Museum of America. L. Harbach & Sons occupied this complex from 1906 to 1928. One of the buildings was their factory and the other was their warehouse. The Harbach family sold the business around 1920 to the Davidson family, who continued to use the Harbach name until through 1928, and continued to own the building until 1952. They leased the buildings to Way-Helms Co. & Red Cross Mattress for a short time, and then beginning in 1930, to the Ginsberg family. Both the Davidsons and the Ginsbergs owned local furniture stores. The Ginsbergs acquired the buildings from the Davisons and they owned them until 1985. They altered the building as trucks replaced trains as the main mode of transportation for furniture warehousing and distribution. The buildings were listed on the National Register of Historic Places in 2015.
