= Des Moines Saddlery Company Building =

- U.S. National Register of Historic Places
- The Des Moines Saddlery Company Building from the south-southeast

- Location within Iowa Location within the United States
- Location: 307–311 Court Ave. Des Moines, Iowa
- Coordinates: 41°35′7.8″N 93°37′15.7″W
- Area: less than one acre
- Built: c.1878; 148 years ago, 1887; 139 years ago, 1901; 125 years ago, 1920; 106 years ago
- Architectural style: Italianate
- MPS: Architectural Legacy of Proudfoot & Bird in Iowa MPS
- NRHP reference No.: 85001378
- Added to NRHP: June 27, 1985

The Des Moines Saddlery Company Building is a historic building in downtown Des Moines, Iowa, United States. It was built in 1881 by J. Rubelman of Muscatine, Iowa. He choose to move his operation to Des Moines because of its location on two rivers and the 13 railroads that served the city. It was one of four saddlery firms in a two block area. Rubelman's company made saddles, harnesses and leather works for 20 years. In the years since it has housed a shoe maker, rubber company, stove manufacturer, glove company, the Krispy Kone Company and the Kaplan Hat Company. The later was also the name of the restaurant that was located on the first floor.

The building, which was built in four phases between c. 1878 to 1920, is the most intact example of commercial Italianate architecture extant in Des Moines. It was built to house both retail and manufacturing purposes. The building was flooded with 19 feet (6 m) of water during the Des Moines River flood of 1993. It remained empty until the Court Avenue Restaurant & Brewing Company moved in with its equipment. The Des Moines Saddlery Company Building was listed on the National Register of Historic Places in 1985.

In 2016, the Republic of Kosovo selected the Saddlery Company Building to host a consulate office.
