= The Elmwood-The Oaks-The Birches =

- U.S. National Register of Historic Places
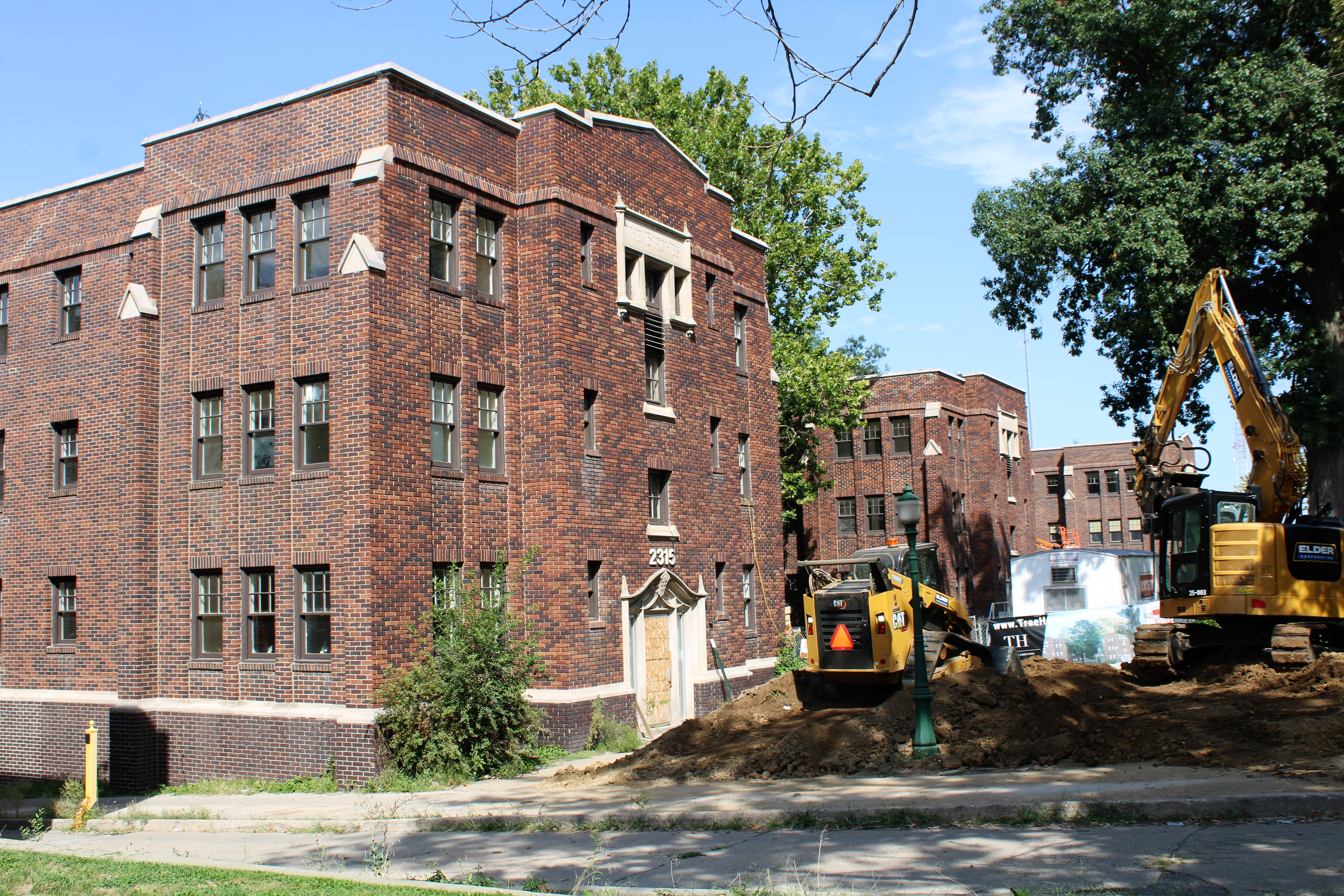
- The buildings being renovated in 2022

- Location within Iowa Location within the United States
- Location: 2315 Grand Ave. Des Moines, Iowa
- Coordinates: 41°35′05.3″N 93°38′55.2″W
- Built: 1923
- Architect: Vorse, Kraetsch & Kraetsch
- NRHP reference No.: 100006155
- Added to NRHP: February 17, 2021

The Elmwood-The Oaks-The Birches, also known as the Grand Trees Apartments, are three historic buildings located in Des Moines, Iowa, United States. The local architectural firm of Vorse, Kraetsch & Kraetsch designed three-story brick structures that were built in 1923. The buildings, which together contain 93 units, are connected by courtyards and stone archways. Above the main entrances are imprints of the trees' leaves - elm, oak, and birch - in the stonework. Parking lots for the apartments are located behind the buildings. A $16.9 million historic renovation was begun in 2021 and will include adding elevators, which the buildings did not have. The buildings were listed on the National Register of Historic Places in 2021.
