= Charles H. and Lena May Weitz House =

Historic house in Iowa, United States

- U.S. National Register of Historic Places
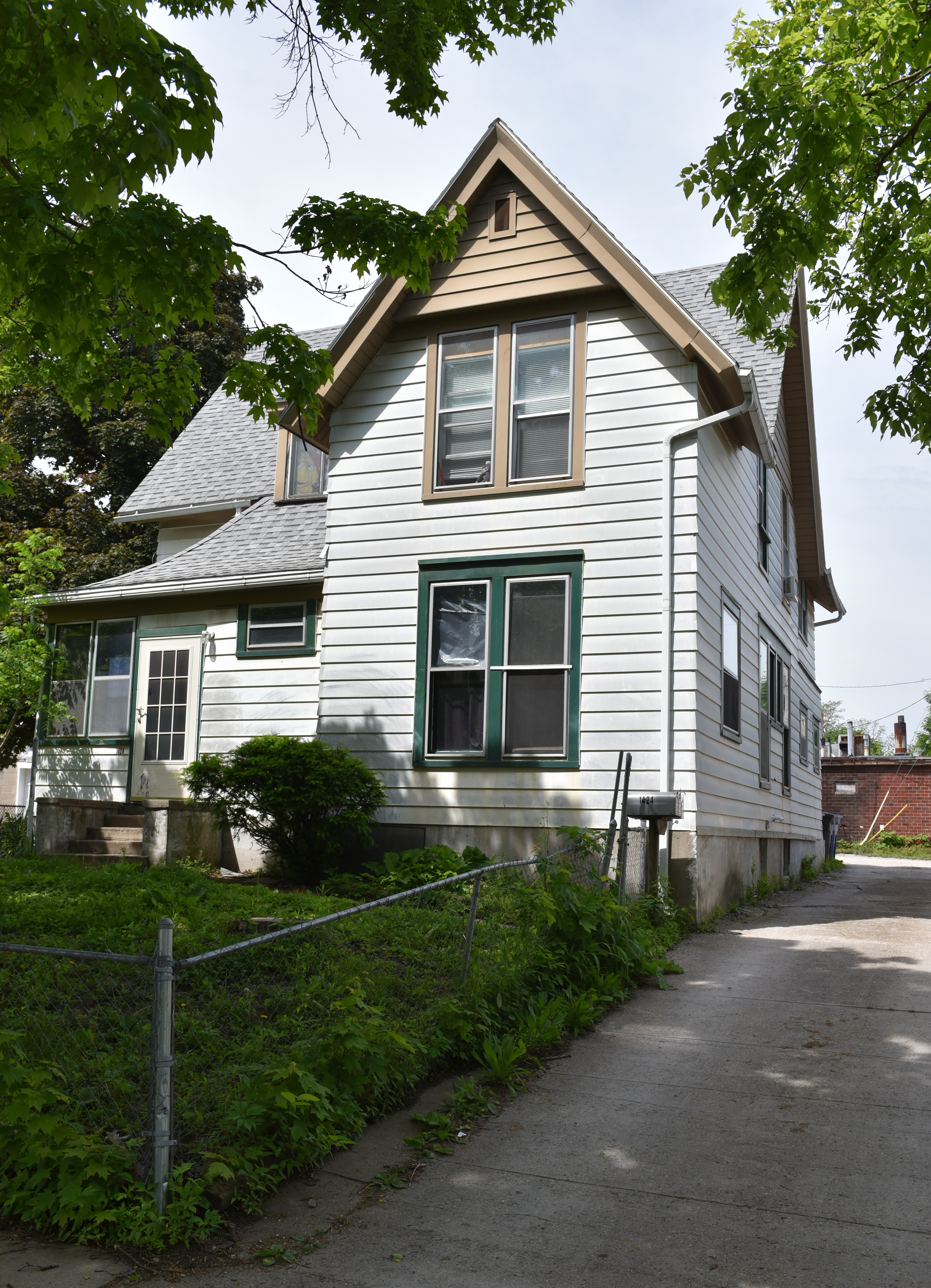

- Location within Iowa Location within the United States
- Location: 1424 5th Ave. Des Moines, Iowa
- Coordinates: 41°36′16.4″N 93°37′29.3″W
- Area: less than one acre
- Built: 1891
- Built by: Charles H. Weitz
- Architectural style: Colonial Revival
- MPS: Towards a Greater Des Moines MPS
- NRHP reference No.: 98001282
- Added to NRHP: October 22, 1998

The Charles H. and Lena May Weitz House is a historic building located in Des Moines, Iowa, United States. This 1½-story frame dwelling features a gable-front-and-wing configuration, a front porch located in the el of the facade, a single-story bay window on the south elevation, a dormer window on the facade, and steeply pitched roofs. Behind the house is a two-story, brick outbuilding. It is one of the few brick out buildings in the neighborhood. Both were constructed about 1891 by Charles H. Weitz for his home and his workshop. He was a partner and elder son of the founder of Charles Weitz & Sons, which was a prominent Des Moines construction firm in the late 19th and early 20th-century. During his time with the company, Charles H. Weitz "introduced modern methods of construction to this family business, thereby assuring its potential for growth." The Weitz Company grew to become a nationally recognized full-service general contractor. The house and outbuilding were listed together on the National Register of Historic Places in 1998.
