= Iowa Ford Tractor Company Repair and Warehouse Building =

- U.S. National Register of Historic Places
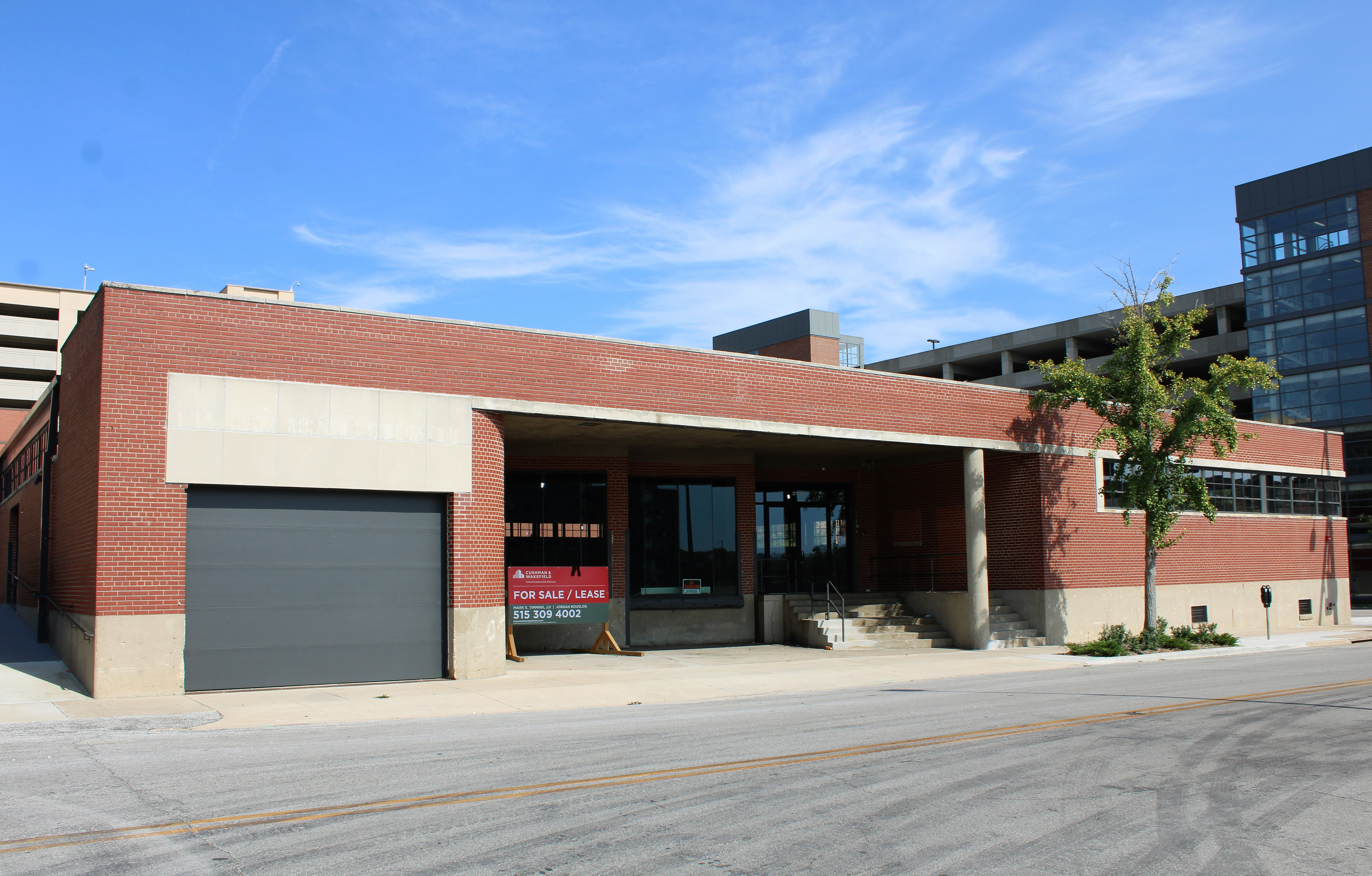

- Location within Iowa Location within the United States
- Location: 213 13th St. Des Moines, Iowa
- Coordinates: 41°35′00″N 93°37′57″W
- Area: less than one acre
- Built: 1949
- NRHP reference No.: 100006262
- Added to NRHP: March 8, 2021

The Iowa Ford Tractor Company Repair and Warehouse Building is a historic building located in Des Moines, Iowa, United States. The single-story, 15,000-square-foot (1,400 m^{2}) building was built in 1949. It was used by the Iowa Ford Tractor Company as a tractor repair and storage facility. In 1977 the building was acquired by the H.B. Leiserowitz Company. They were mostly a photography supply company but they were also a general store and they sold wholesale candy, soda, chips, and cigarettes to small grocery stories and gas stations. It closed in 2017 after its owner died. Green Acre Development Company bought the building later the same year and has plans to convert it into offices. It was listed on the National Register of Historic Places in 2021.
