= Earle & LeBosquet Block =

- U.S. National Register of Historic Places
- The Earle & LeBosquet Block from the south-southeast

- Location within Iowa Location within the United States
- Location: 407–409 Court Ave. Des Moines, Iowa
- Coordinates: 41°35′6.7″N 93°37′19.9″W
- Area: less than one acre
- Built: 1896; 130 years ago
- Built by: Gerrit Van Ginkel
- Architect: Charles Edward Eastman
- Architectural style: Classical Revival; Commercial
- NRHP reference No.: 09000402
- Added to NRHP: June 11, 2009

The Earle & LeBosquet Block, also known as the Redhead & Wellslager Block, is a historic building in Des Moines, Iowa, United States. Completed in 1896, the building is a fine example of the work of Des Moines architect Charles E. Eastman. It shows Eastman's ability to use Neoclassical forms and integrate the more modern Chicago Commercial style. It is also an early use of terra cotta for architectural detailing and buff-colored brick for the main facade in Des Moines, which became widespread in the city in the following decades. The main floor housed two commercial spaces and the upper floors were used for warehouse space. The four-story structure was built by local contractor Gerrit Van Ginkel, and it was owned by attorneys Ira M. Earle and Peter S. LeBosquet. It replaced a three-story brick building that was built at this location in 1876. The building was listed on the National Register of Historic Places in 2009.
