= F.A. Benham House =

Historic house in Iowa, United States

- U.S. National Register of Historic Places
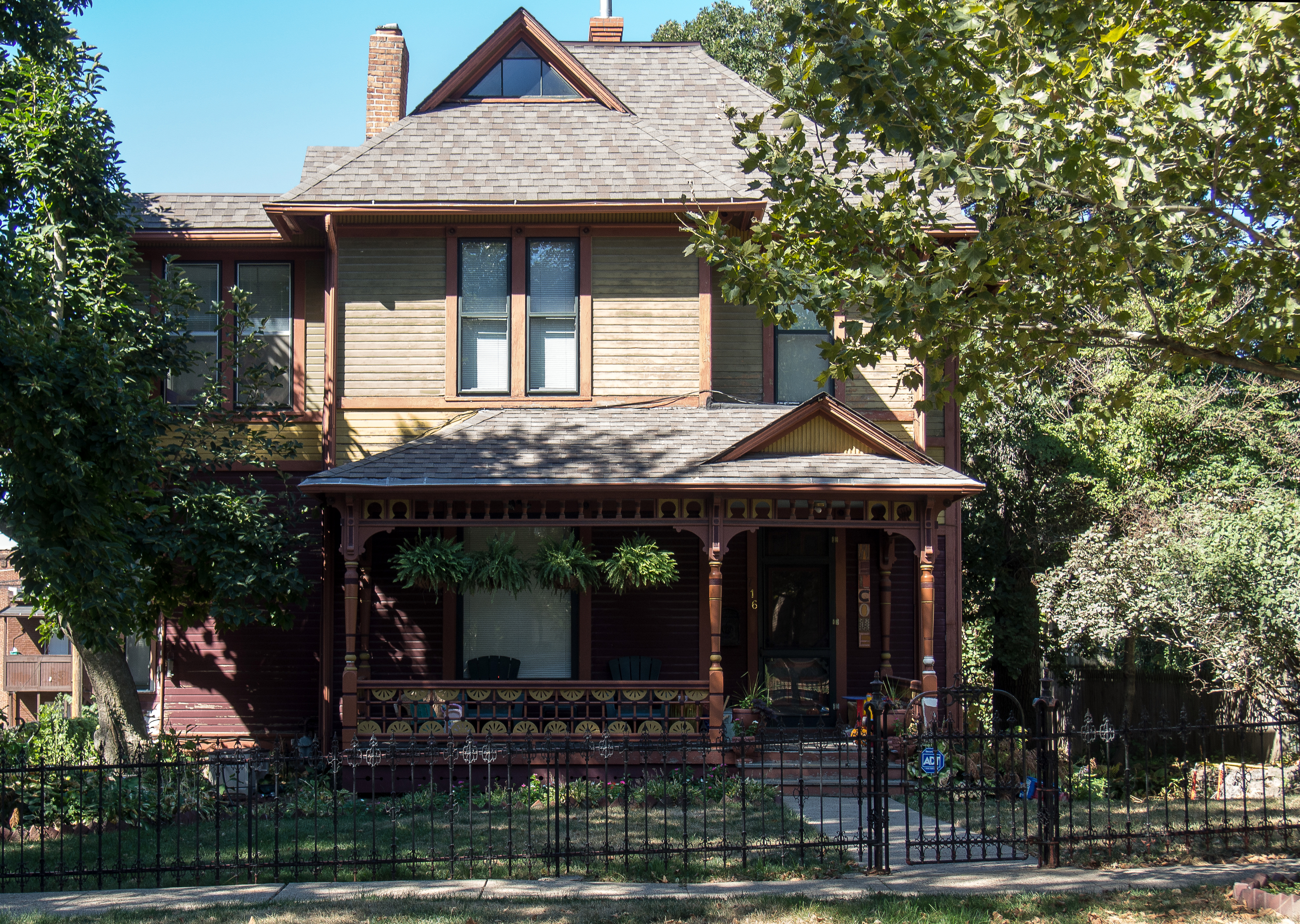

- Location within Iowa Location within the United States
- Location: 716 19th St., Des Moines, Iowa
- Coordinates: 41°35′25.5″N 93°38′34.1″W
- Area: less than one acre
- Built: 1884
- Architectural style: Stick/Eastlake
- MPS: Towards a Greater Des Moines MPS
- NRHP reference No.: 98001326
- Added to NRHP: November 5, 1998

The F.A. Benham House, also known as the Stoner House and the Barquist House, is a historic building located in Des Moines, Iowa, United States. Built in 1884, the two-story structure features wood-frame construction, a brick foundation, and decorative details that were influenced by the Stick Style of architecture. Its significance is found in its late Victorian design that is exemplified in the Eastlake style. It can be seen in the building's massing, roof's steep pitch, and front porch's spindlework. The house was listed on the National Register of Historic Places in 1998. The house shares the historic designation with the frame barn (c. 1900) and the Victorian cast iron fence and gate that runs in front of the house.
