= Trent–Beaver House =

Historic house in Iowa, United States

- U.S. National Register of Historic Places
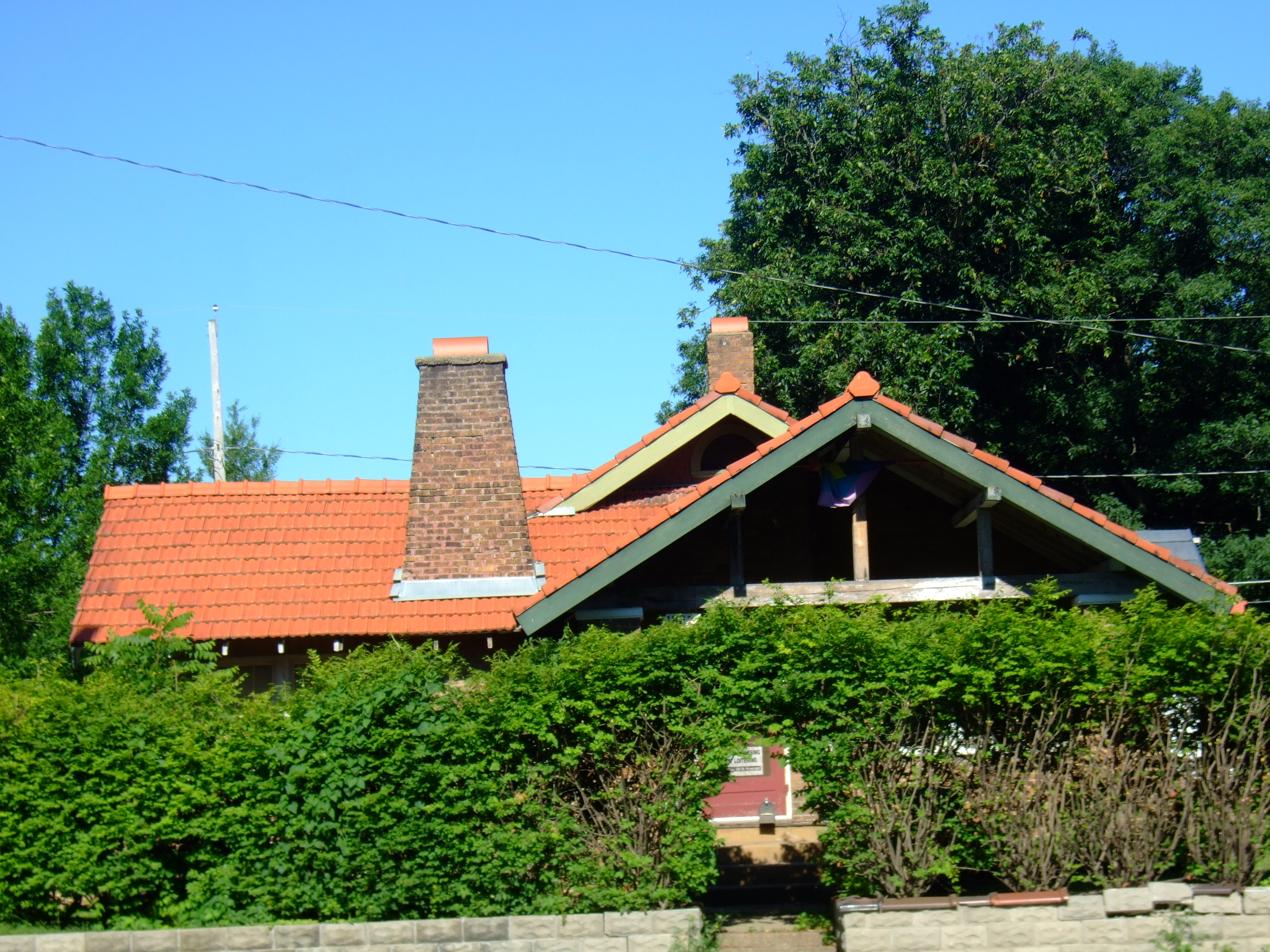

- Location within Iowa Location within the United States
- Location: 1802 6th Ave. Des Moines, Iowa
- Coordinates: 41°36′37.3″N 93°37′33.9″W
- Area: less than one acre
- Built: 1917
- Built by: John Martin Company
- Architectural style: Craftsman
- MPS: Towards a Greater Des Moines MPS
- NRHP reference No.: 96001145
- Added to NRHP: October 25, 1996

The Trent–Beaver House is a historic building in Des Moines, Iowa, United States. This single-story, brick, American Craftsman dwelling was completed in 1917 by the John Martin Company. It was as a single family dwelling built for the Central Land & Real Estate Company, which was a partnership of the brothers Francis E. Trent and John G. Trent. In 1923 it was converted into a mixed use building by Doctors Lincoln and Elizabeth Beaver, who were both chiropractors. They converted the front room into their office and lived in the rest of the house. They remained here until 1940. The house is significant for a couple of reasons. First, it call attention to the importance of small real estate developers and contractor-builders in the suburban residential development of Des Moines during the 1910s. Secondly, it calls attention to the importance of the streetcar in stimulating higher land use along its routes. The Trent-Beaver House was located along the 6th Avenue streetcar line, which helped the conversion of this single-family dwelling into a professional office. It was part of a wider movement of professional services from the central business district to the suburban areas that public transportation made possible. The house was listed on the National Register of Historic Places in 1996.
