= Nellie and Thomas Knotts House =

Historic house in Iowa, United States

- U.S. National Register of Historic Places
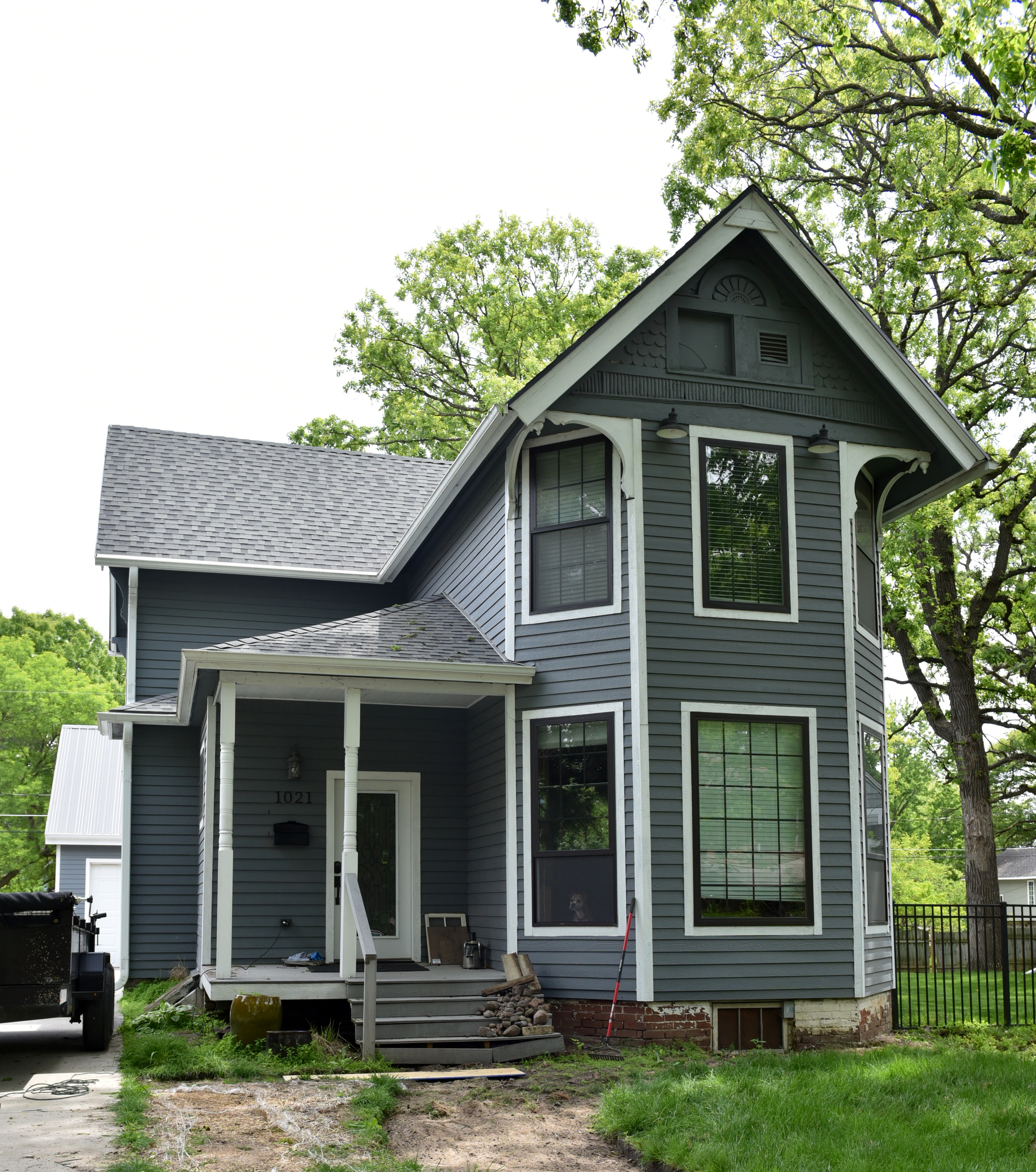

- Location within Iowa Location within the United States
- Location: 1021 26th St. Des Moines, Iowa
- Coordinates: 41°35′45.4″N 93°39′06.7″W
- Area: less than one acre
- Built: 1894
- Architectural style: Late Victorian
- MPS: Drake University and Related Properties in Des Moines, Iowa, 1881--1918 MPS
- NRHP reference No.: 88001333
- Added to NRHP: September 8, 1988

The Nellie and Thomas Knotts House is a historic building located in Des Moines, Iowa, United States. This two-story dwelling is a gabled-ell type house that features a chamfered front section with gable-end detail, fishscale shingles, and a hipped porch. The property on which it stands is one of ten plats that were owned by Drake University. The University sold this lot and two others to Adam Howell in 1886. He sold this lot to Harold R. Howell in 1891. Nellie J. and Thomas H. Knotts acquired the property in 1893, and the house was built the following year. Knotts was president of Iowa Printing Company and then became a manager of the Union Mutual Life Insurance Company. He and his wife resided here until at least 1907. Its significance is attributed to the effect of the University's innovative financing techniques upon the settlement of the area around the campus. The house was listed on the National Register of Historic Places in 1988.
