= National Register of Historic Places listings in Webster County, Iowa =

Location of Webster County in Iowa

This is a list of the National Register of Historic Places listings in Webster County, Iowa.

This is intended to be a complete list of the properties and districts on the National Register of Historic Places in Webster County, Iowa, United States. Latitude and longitude coordinates are provided for many National Register properties and districts; these locations may be seen together in a map.

There are 16 properties and districts listed on the National Register in the county.

This National Park Service list is complete through NPS recent listings posted May 15, 2026.

	Name on the Register	Image	Date listed	Location	City or town	Description
1	Lorenzo S. Coffin Burial Plot	Lorenzo S. Coffin Burial Plot	November 17, 1977 (#77000566)	Northwest of Fort Dodge on Iowa Highway 7; 42°31′40″N 94°14′26″W	Fort Dodge	
2	Corpus Christi Church	Corpus Christi Church	October 8, 1976 (#76000812)	416 N. 8th St. 42°30′31″N 94°11′20″W	Fort Dodge	
3	Dolliver Memorial State Park, Entrance Area (Area A)	Dolliver Memorial State Park, Entrance Area (Area A)	November 15, 1990 (#90001684)	North of Iowa Highway 50 on the Des Moines River; 42°24′06″N 94°04′56″W	Lehigh	
4	Dolliver Memorial State Park, Picnic, Hiking & Maintenance Area (Area B)	Dolliver Memorial State Park, Picnic, Hiking & Maintenance Area (Area B)	November 15, 1990 (#90001685)	North of Iowa Highway 50 on the Des Moines River; 42°23′13″N 94°04′53″W	Lehigh	
5	First National Bank Building	First National Bank Building	February 27, 2003 (#03000061)	629 Central Ave. 42°30′17″N 94°11′19″W	Fort Dodge	
6	Fort Dodge Downtown Historic District	Fort Dodge Downtown Historic District	November 10, 2010 (#10000918)	1st Ave. N., Central Ave., and 1st Ave. S. from 3rd St. on the west to 12th St. on east 42°30′18″N 94°11′15″W	Fort Dodge	
7	Fort Dodge Junior High School		October 13, 2015 (#15000730)	416 S. 10th St. 42°30′06″N 94°11′01″W	Fort Dodge	
8	Fort Dodge Senior High School		October 13, 2015 (#15000731)	1015 5th Ave., N. 42°30′36″N 94°11′08″W	Fort Dodge	
9	Harcourt Consolidated School Gymnasium		May 21, 2026 (#100013022)	116 South Larch Street; 42°15′48″N 94°10′39″W	Harcourt	
10	Oak Hill Historic District	Oak Hill Historic District	May 5, 1977 (#77000567)	8th-12th Sts. and 2nd and 3rd Aves. 42°30′20″N 94°11′11″W	Fort Dodge	
11	Oakland Cemetery	Oakland Cemetery	August 25, 2000 (#00000984)	1600 N. 15th St. 42°30′45″N 94°10′47″W	Fort Dodge	
12	Oleson Park Music Pavilion	Oleson Park Music Pavilion	May 9, 2003 (#03000357)	1400 Oleson Park Ave. 42°29′20″N 94°10′20″W	Fort Dodge	
13	Sacred Heart Catholic Church		October 26, 2022 (#100008305)	211 South 13th St. 42°30′14″N 94°10′50″W	Fort Dodge	
14	Vincent House	Vincent House	April 23, 1973 (#73000743)	824 3rd Ave., S. 42°30′10″N 94°11′01″W	Fort Dodge	
15	Wahkonsa Hotel	Wahkonsa Hotel	May 21, 2008 (#08000443)	927 Central Ave. 42°30′19″N 94°11′09″W	Fort Dodge	
16	Webster County Courthouse	Webster County Courthouse	July 2, 1981 (#81000274)	701 Central Ave. 42°30′17″N 94°11′17″W	Fort Dodge	

== Former listings ==
	Name on the Register	Image	Date listed	Date removed	Location	City or town	Description
1	Illinois Central Freight House and Office Building-Fort Dodge		September 6, 1990 (#90001306)	January 30, 2003	Jct. of 4th St. and 4th Ave., S.	Fort Dodge	
2	Illinois Central Passenger Depot--Fort Dodge		September 6, 1990 (#90001307)	January 30, 2003	Jct. of 4th St. and 4th Ave., S.	Fort Dodge	

== See also ==
- List of National Historic Landmarks in Iowa
- National Register of Historic Places listings in Iowa
- Listings in neighboring counties: Boone, Calhoun, Greene, Hamilton, Humboldt, Pocahontas, Wright
