= Mason City YMCA =

Building in Mason City, Iowa, US

- U.S. National Register of Historic Places
- U.S. Historic district – Contributing property
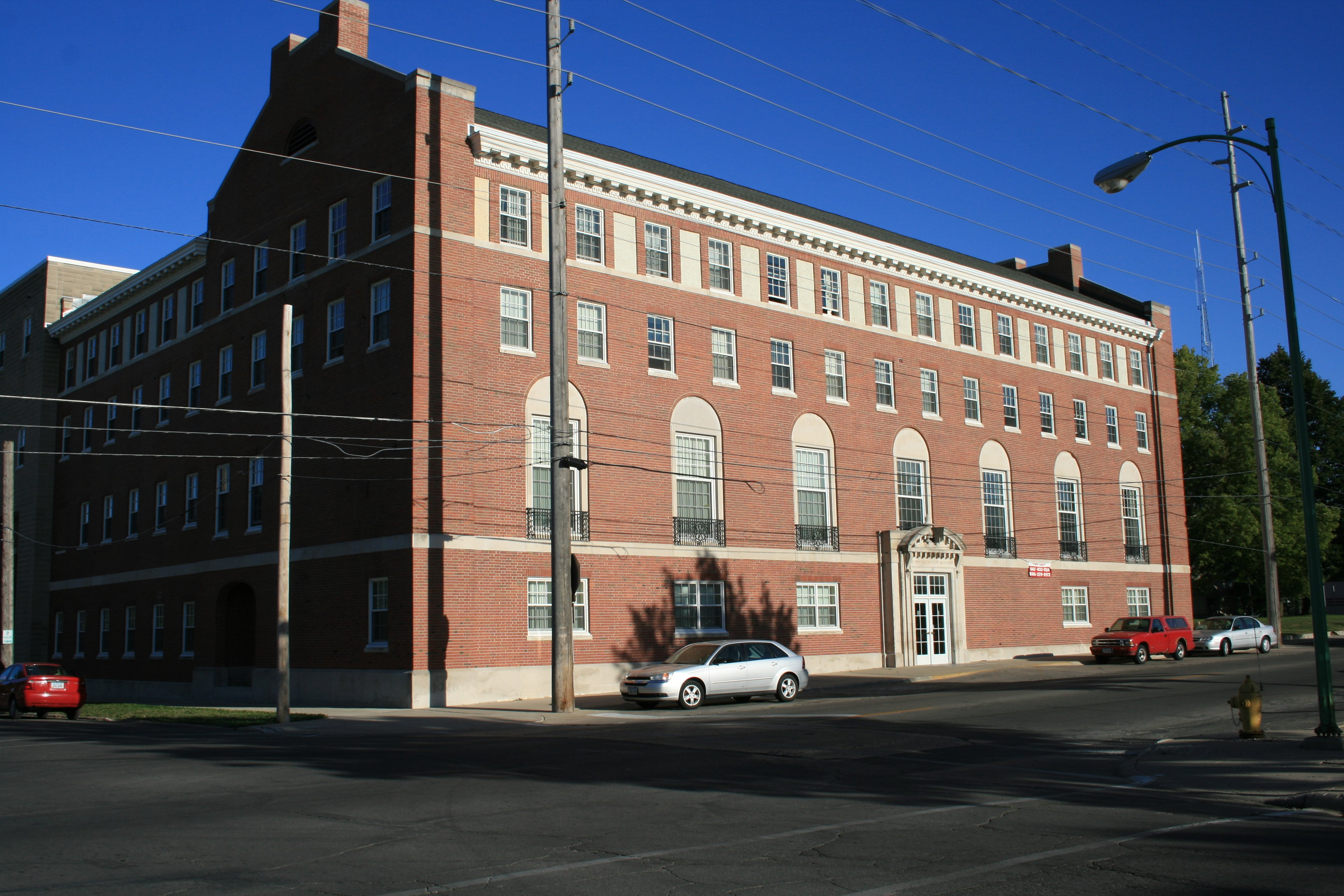

- Location within Iowa Location within the United States
- Location: 15 N. Pennsylvania; Mason City, Iowa
- Coordinates: 43°09′08.8″N 93°11′51.1″W
- Area: less than one acre
- Built: 1926
- Built by: Madsen Construction Company
- Architect: Tyrie and Chapman
- Architectural style: Colonial Revival
- Part of: Mason City Downtown Historic District (ID05000956)
- NRHP reference No.: 02000426
- Added to NRHP: May 2, 2002

The Mason City YMCA is a historic building located in Mason City, Iowa, United States. The local YMCA was organized in 1892 and it was housed in a variety of places in the city. Various attempts were made to build their own building and properties were acquired and traded before this location was acquired from St. John's Episcopal Church. Charles McNider, a local community leader, led the campaign to build this structure. The Minneapolis architectural firm of Tyrie and Chapman designed the Colonial Revival style building that was built by Madsen Construction Company, also of Minneapolis. Many of the materials used in its construction were produced locally. Even though it was completed late in 1926 it sat empty until all the pledges to complete its construction were fulfilled. The building contained room for athletic facilities, a restaurant, offices, and dormitory rooms on the upper floors.

Local legend has it that two members of John Dillinger's gang stayed here while they cased the city before, Dillinger, Baby Face Nelson, John Hamilton and Tommy Carroll robbed the First National Bank in 1934, which was owned by McNider. Track star Jesse Owens starred in a basketball exhibition held here in 1937. It was also the host of a variety of community activities over the years, including weekend teen dances held in the 1940s nicknamed "Hi-Dive." The building was individually listed on the National Register of Historic Places in 2002, and as a contributing property in the Mason City Downtown Historic District in 2005.
