= Mason City Downtown Historic District =

Historic district in Iowa, United States

- U.S. National Register of Historic Places
- U.S. Historic district
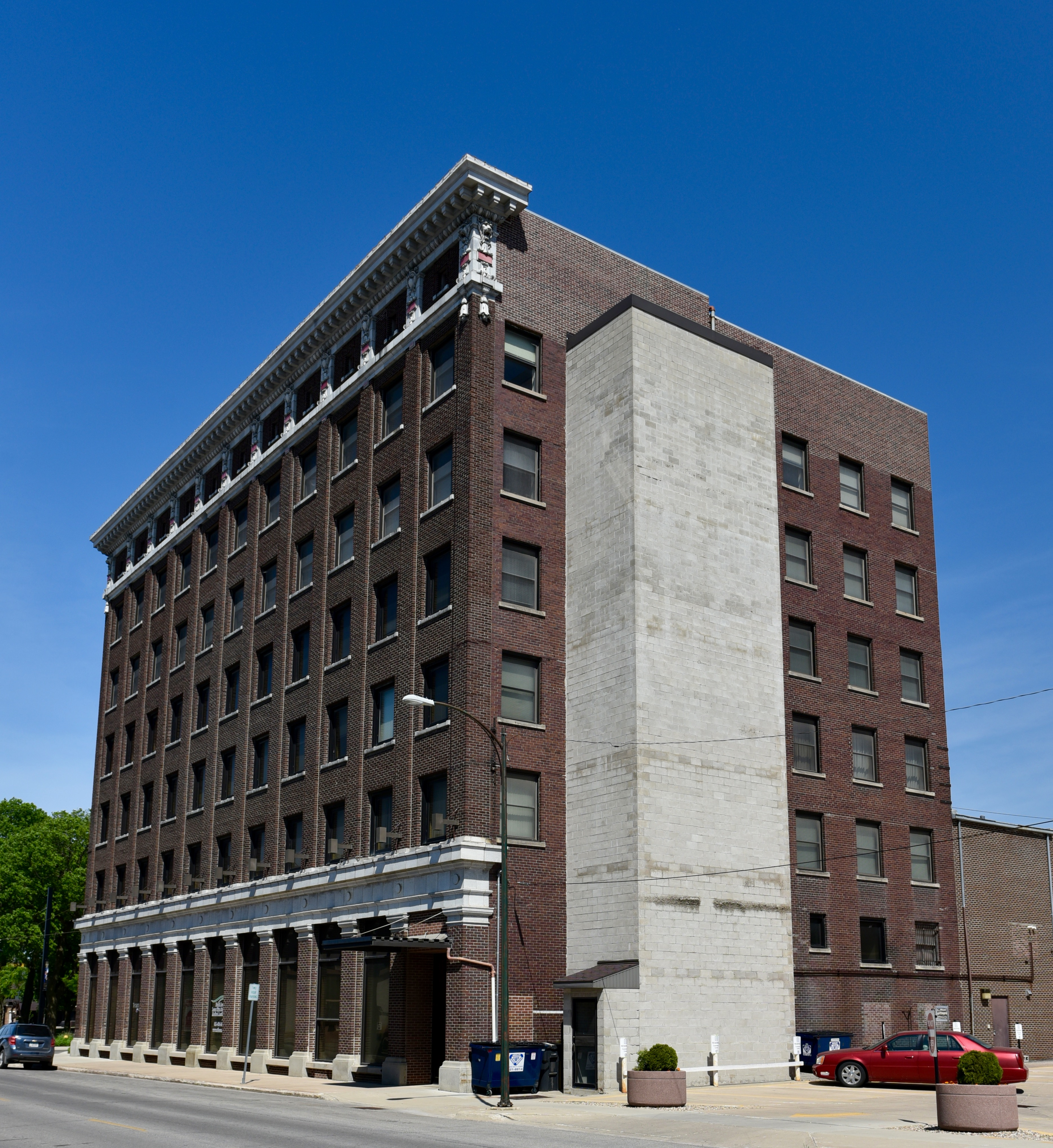

- Location within Iowa Location within the United States
- Location: Roughly bounded by N. 6th St., Georgia Ave., Washington Ave., and S. 2nd St., Mason City, Iowa
- Coordinates: 43°09′09.7″N 93°12′03.9″W
- Area: 49.75 acres (20.13 ha)
- Architect: Frank Lloyd Wright
- Architectural style: Late Victorian; Late 19th & early 20th century Revivals
- NRHP reference No.: 05000956
- Added to NRHP: September 8, 2005

The Mason City Downtown Historic District is a nationally recognized historic district located in Mason City, Iowa, United States. It was listed on the National Register of Historic Places in 2005. At the time of its nomination it contained 93 resources, which included 63 contributing buildings, one contributing site, four objects, 22 non-contributing buildings, and three non-contributing objects. Platted in 1855, Mason City is a commercial and industrial center for north central Iowa. It was also a railroad center, but the tracks bypassed the central business district in order to serve the industries located on the north side of town and the wholesale enterprises on the south side. Central Park, a public square, was part of the city's original plat and is the contributing site.

Most of the buildings in the downtown area were builder-contractor designed. Among the builders were Geo. P. Petersen & Son and M.M. Moen Company (later Davey & Moen). There are also several examples of architect designed buildings. They include Parker's Opera House (1883) by William Foster, the former Mason City Public Library (1904) by Patton & Miller, the Park Inn Hotel (1909) and the City National Bank (1910) by Frank Lloyd Wright, First National Bank (1911) by Liebbe, Nourse & Rasmussen, the MBA Building (1917) by Bell & Bentley, the Hanford Hotel (1921) by Proudfoot, Bird & Rawson, the YMCA (1926) by Tyrie and Chapman, and the former First Church of Christ, Scientist (1928) by Clyde W. Smith. There are also buildings designed by prominent local architects E.R. Bogardus and Karl Waggoner. An apartment building, The Kirk (1903), destroyed by fire in 2023, is also individually listed on the National Register.
