= Phillips Middle School =

Phillips Middle School is the name of several middle schools in the United States:

- Phillips Middle School in Fort Dodge, Iowa
- Guy B. Phillips Middle School in Chapel Hill, North Carolina, part of Chapel Hill-Carrboro City Schools
