= Modern Brotherhood of America Building =

- MBA (Modern Brotherhood of America) Building
- U.S. National Register of Historic Places
- U.S. Historic district – Contributing property
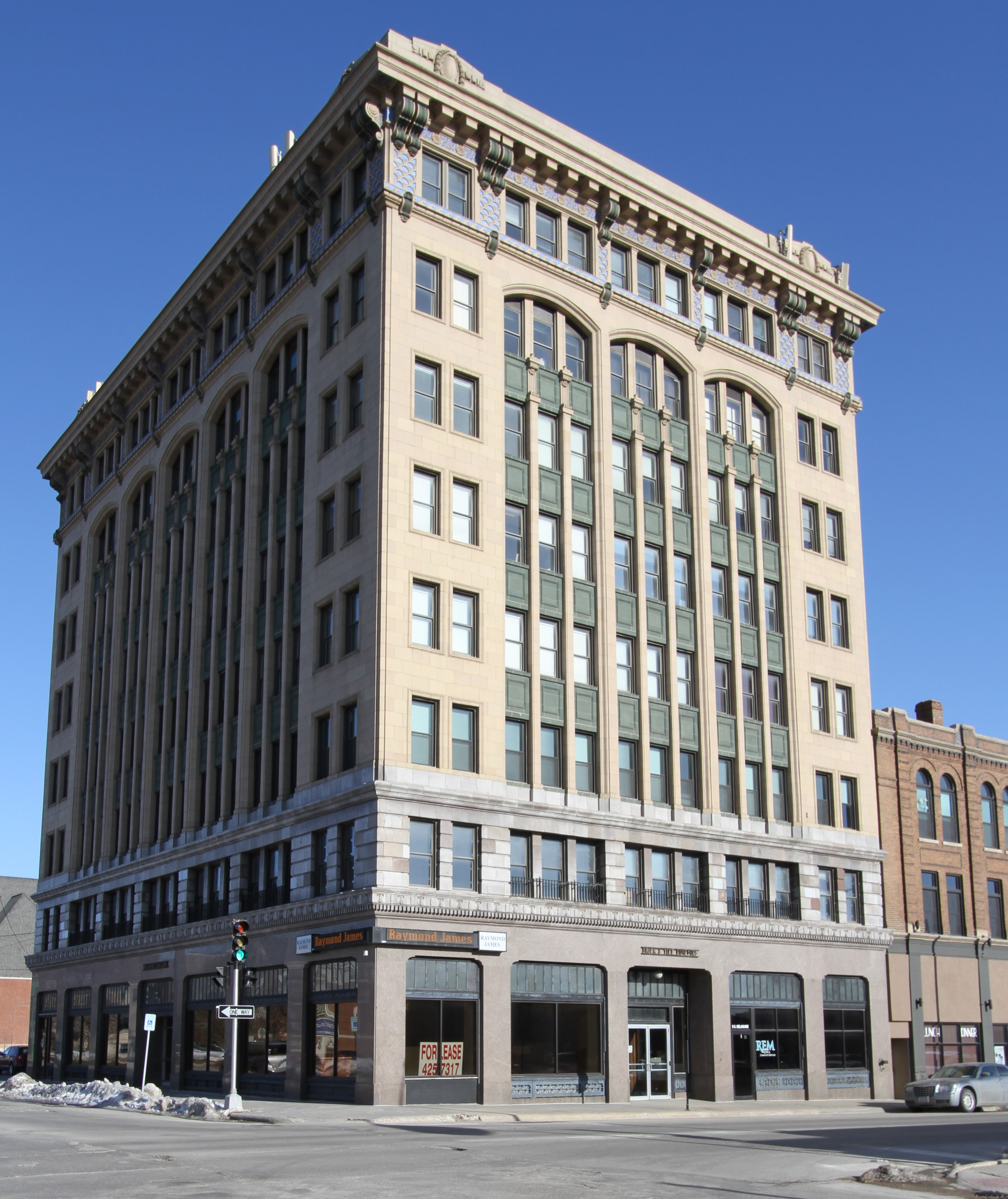

- Location within Iowa Location within the United States
- Location: 103 E. State St. Mason City, Iowa
- Coordinates: 43°09′03.8″N 93°11′56.9″W
- Area: less than one acre
- Built: 1917
- Architect: Bell & Bentley
- Architectural style: Early Commercial
- Part of: Mason City Downtown Historic District (ID05000956)
- NRHP reference No.: 02001021
- Added to NRHP: September 12, 2002

The MBA Building, or Modern Brotherhood of America Building, also known as the Brick and Tile Building, is a large office building in Mason City, Iowa, built in 1916-1917 for the Modern Brotherhood of America, a fraternal lodge. The MBA's primary purpose was to provide life insurance to its members, and the building housed those operations.

== Modern Brotherhood of America ==
The Modern Brotherhood of America was founded in Tipton, Iowa on April 5, 1897. One of its founders, and Supreme President for its first 22 years was Thomas B. Hanley (1852−1919), a former mayor of Tipton, as well as an active Pythian and Mason. Membership reached 130,000 during the period of cheap rates, but fell off in the 1910s as the Order attempted to institute actuarially sound rates and was hit by the First World War and the influenza epidemic. Nevertheless, it was during this period that the M.B.A. building was acquired.

By 1923 the M.B.A. had 48,610 benefit members every state except the Deep South (Florida, Alabama, Mississippi, Arkansas and Louisiana) and Canada. While the M.B.A didn't mention anything about rituals or secrets in their propaganda literature, they did have a ritual that was adopted at their Supreme Lodge in December 1901. Officers of the order included the Supreme President, Supreme Vice-president, Supreme Treasurer, Supreme Physician, Supreme Chaplain, Supreme Conductor, Supreme Watchman, Supreme Sentry, General Attorney, and the board of directors. The headquarters were called the "Supreme Office". They also published a newspaper, Modern Brotherhood.

== History ==
The MBA Building was built on the site of a former Elks lodge in downtown Mason City. The building was designed by architects Bell & Bentley of Minneapolis. Work began on the new building on May 18, 1916, and the building was dedicated on June 6 and 7, 1917, with a speech by former U.S. president William Howard Taft. The Modern Brotherhood of America merged with the Independent Order of Foresters, who sold the building in 1948 to the Mason City Brick and Tile Company, who renamed it after the company. The building was again sold in 1973 to State Street Investment, which undertook a renovation. The building was sold again in 2000.

== Description ==
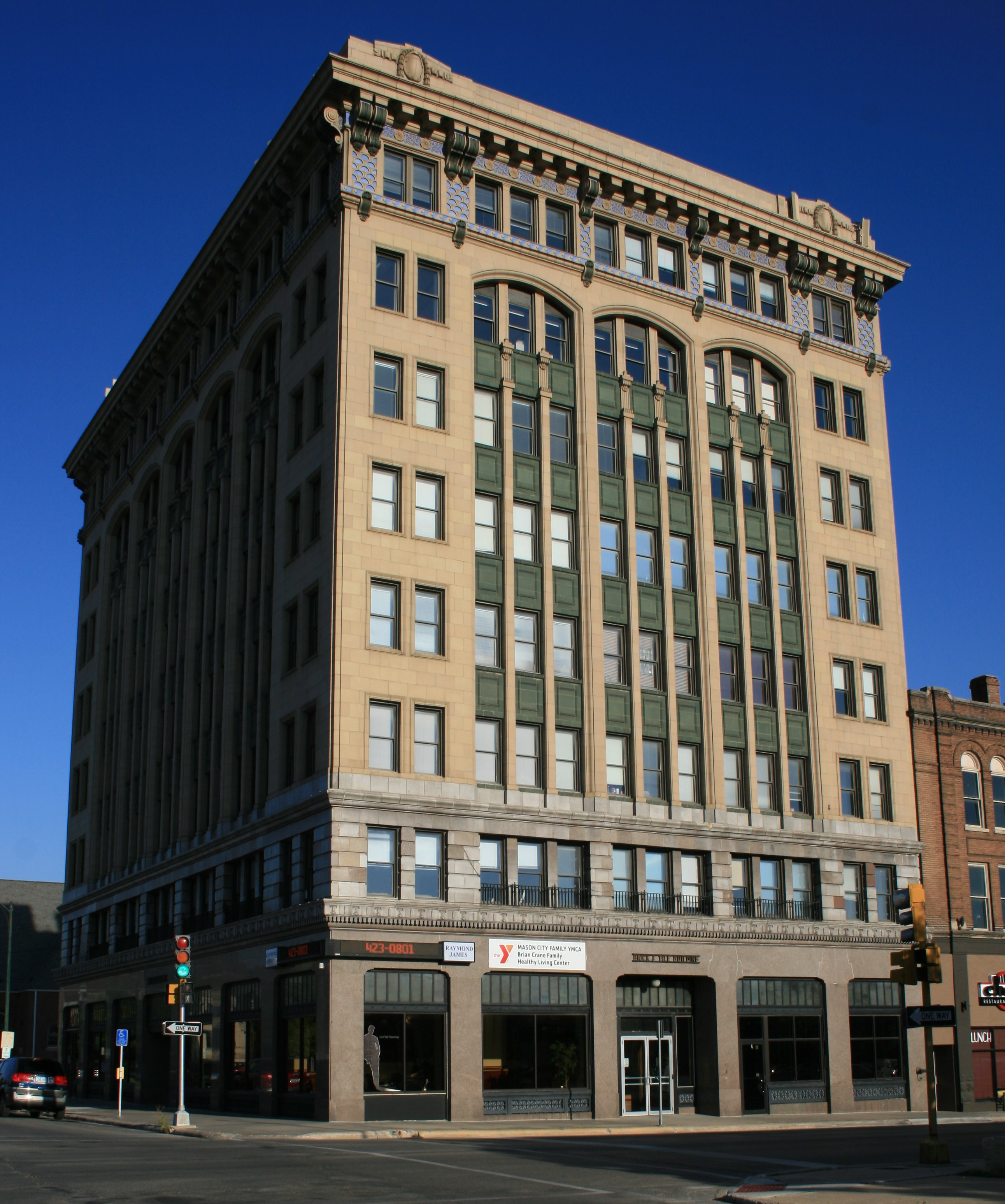
The building in 2012

The steel-framed MBA Building is an eight-story early twentieth-century commercial building, designed according to Classical Revival principals with a base, shaft and capital. The two primary street facades are arranged in five bays each. The ground floor comprises the base, and is clad in granite with wide glazed storefront openings. The second floor is clad in terra cotta, capping the base with a cornice. The third through seventh floors are clad in lighter-colored terra cotta, with pilasters in the three central bays forming an analogue to the fluting of a column's shaft, with sash windows in between the pilasters. At the tops of the pilasters a series of sixteen electric light fixtures mark the ends of the bays. Flat panels of terra cotta clad the corner bays, framing the central bays. A terra cotta cornice separates the seventh floor from the eighth, with arched tops to the central bays. The eighth floor has terra cotta panels separating the windows, with a deep terra cotta cornice over all to complete the capital. The non-street facades are plain brick. Metal fire escapes have been added to provide additional means of egress.

The MBA Building is U-shaped above the second floor, the indentation from the rear providing an opportunity for light and air to reach the center of the building. There are two elevators in the middle of the building at the end of the indentation, with the unusual feature of windows into their shafts. An open stair flanks the elevators. Circulation on the upper floors consists of a double-loaded corridor following the shape of the U. The second floor is rectangular in plan, with internal circulation and glass storefronts appropriate for retail stores. The first floor features a lobby oriented to the stairs and elevator, with marble walls and Ionic pilasters. The lobby's plaster ceiling is beamed and detailed. The original wood and glass vestibule enclosures have survived. Lobby materials are echoed on the upper floors with marble base and oak wainscoting.

The top floor was the Modern Brotherhood of America headquarters, where traces of Classical Revival details have survived. The building has two basements. The upper basement contains some leasable space, while the lower basement is purely for utilities.

The MBA Building was placed on the National Register of Historic Places on September 12, 2002. It was included as a contributing property in the Mason City Downtown Historic District in 2005.
