= Parker's Opera House =

- U.S. National Register of Historic Places
- U.S. Historic district – Contributing property
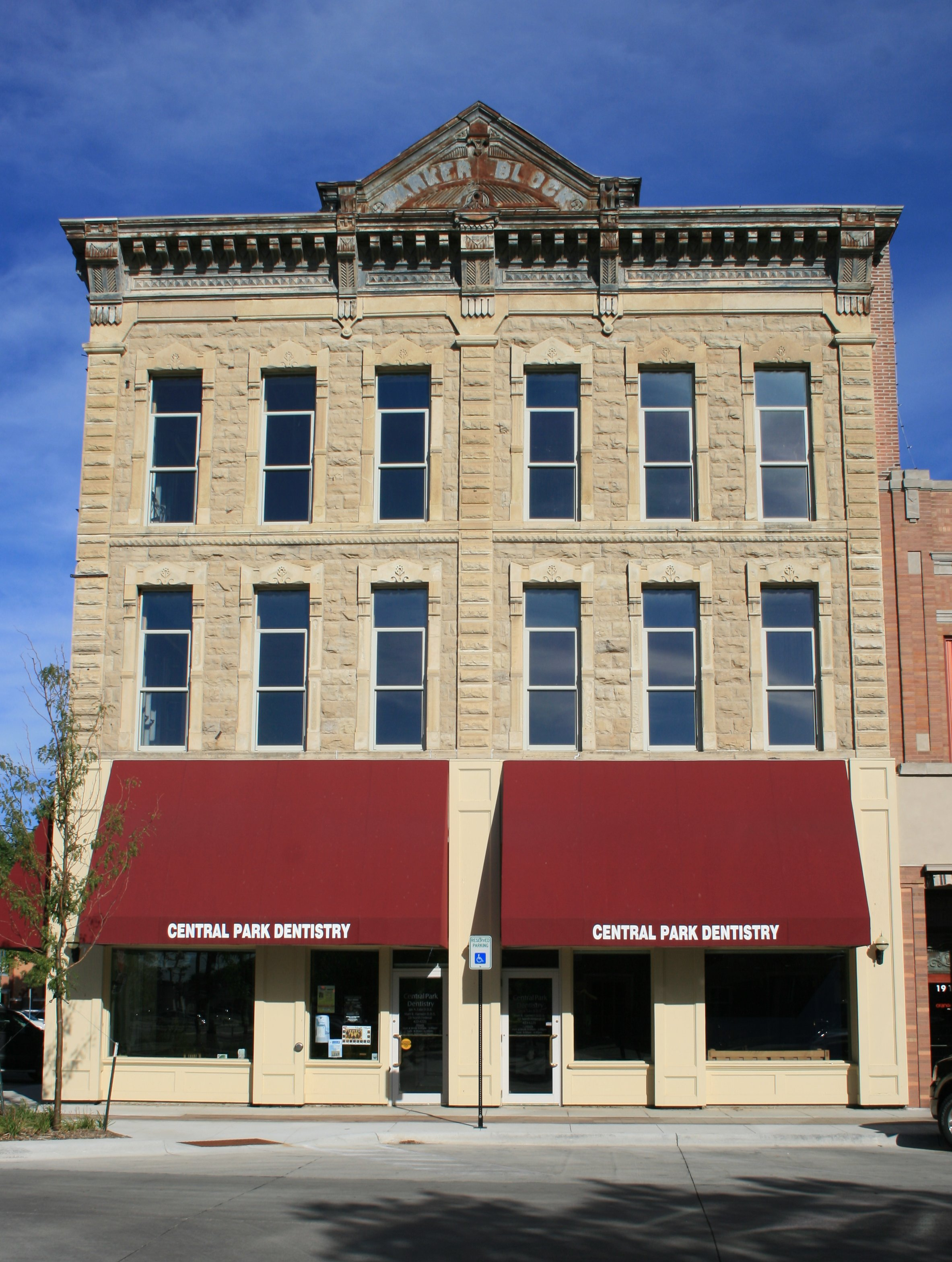

- Location within Iowa Location within the United States
- Location: 23 N. Federal Ave. Mason City, Iowa
- Coordinates: 43°09′09.2″N 93°12′02.3″W
- Area: less than one acre
- Built: 1883
- Architect: William Foster
- Architectural style: Late Victorian
- Part of: Mason City Downtown Historic District (ID05000956)
- NRHP reference No.: 98001325
- Added to NRHP: November 20, 1998

Parker's Opera House, also known as Opera House Store, Woolworth's and Parker Place, is a historic building located in Mason City, Iowa, United States. It was designed by the prominent Des Moines architect William Foster. Cousins H. G. and A. T. Parker built this structure as an opera house, the first in the community. While it initially filled a need in Mason City, it was replaced by more modern theatres around the turn of the 20th century. The third floor was added in 1909, spanning the middle of the auditorium. The first floor initially housed a clothing store, and was occupied by F. W. Woolworth Companystarting in the mid-1920s, while the upper floors housed the local offices of the Standard Oil Company at the same time. A two-story addition at the rear was built in the 1960s. The first floor was redesigned in 1997 for Central Park Dentistry and the upper floors were converted into apartments in 2013.

Stone was used for both structural and decorative purposes and a metal cornice caps the main facade. The building was individually listed on the National Register of Historic Places in 1998, and was designated as a contributing property in the Mason City Downtown Historic District in 2005.
