= Mason City Public Library =

Public library in Mason City, Iowa

- 43°08′56.6″N 93°11′48.7″W
- Location: 225 Second Street, S.E. Mason City, Iowa, United States
- Type: Public
- Established: 1892

Other information
- Director: Mary Markwalter
- Public transit access: Red Orange
- Website: www.mcpl.org
- Mason City Public Library
- U.S. National Register of Historic Places
- U.S. Historic district – Contributing property
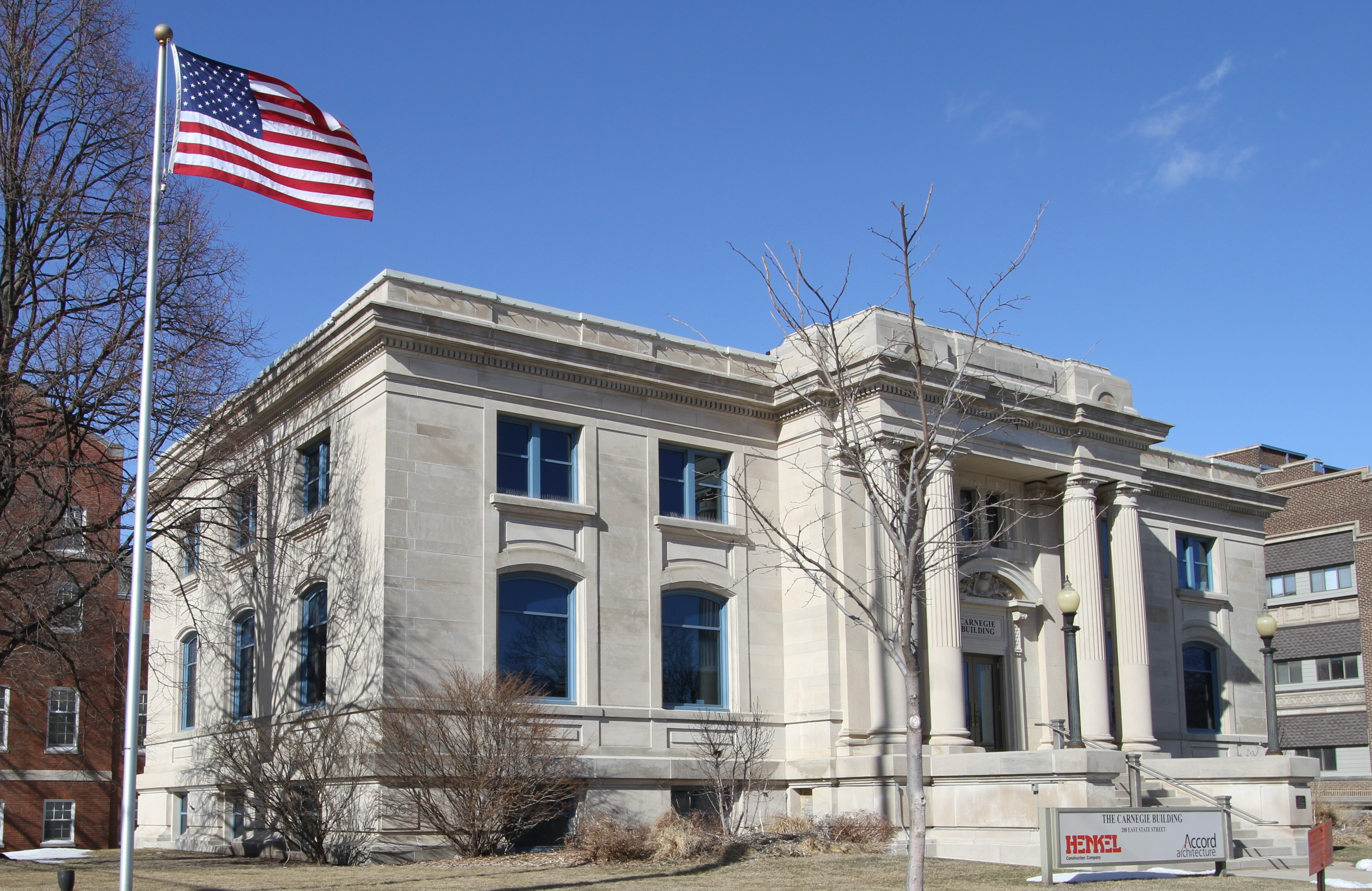
- The Carnegie building

- Location within Iowa Location within the United States
- Location: 208 East State Street
- Coordinates: 43°09′07.5″N 93°11′50.7″W
- Area: less than one acre
- Built: 1904
- Architect: Patton & Miller
- Architectural style: Classical Revival
- Part of: Mason City Downtown Historic District (ID05000956)
- NRHP reference No.: 89000405
- Added to NRHP: May 25, 1989

The Mason City Public Library is located in Mason City, Iowa, United States. The building that was funded by Andrew Carnegie, and is now an office building, was listed on the National Register of Historic Places in 1989. It was included as a contributing property in the Mason City Downtown Historic District in 2005.

== History ==
The first library in Mason City was a subscription library that was organized in 1871, but it did not last long. The second library effort was a reading room that was organized in 1888. In 1892 voters in Mason City approved a tax levy to establish a free public library. It was housed at various locations on both South Federal Avenue and on East State Street. Through the efforts of U.S. Senator William B. Allison, local attorney James E. Blythe made a personal appeal to Andrew Carnegie and his secretary to build a new library building in Mason City. Because of his appeal the city was awarded a grant of $20,000 on April 11, 1902, which was $7,000 more than it would have normally received.

The Chicago architectural firm of Patton & Miller designed the two-story Neoclassical building. Construction was delayed because of a debate in the local community over the use of Bedford stone over local limestone. The architects wanted the Bedford stone because it could be worked to a smooth finish, while the native limestone could not. Other delays contributed the building being completed in December 1904 with a stone veneer of Bedford stone. Dedicated on January 10, 1905, it is considered the finest example of Neoclassical architecture in Mason City.

By the late 1930s the Carnegie library had become too small. The city received a grant from the Public Works Administration (PWA) to expand the building. The MacNider family offered 7 acres (2.8 ha) at Second and Pennsylvania for a new library. The city renegotiated with the PWA to use the grant for a new building. The Chicago architectural firm of Holabird & Root designed the new building, which was dedicated in January 1940. The Denison Room, which overlooks the garden and Willow Creek, and an adjacent patio was completed in 1961. The west wing was added for the Iowa State Library Extension Service in 1966. The Mason City Community Theatre leased the wing from 1981 to 1997 after the Extension Service no longer used it. In 1998 it was remodeled for library use, and the second-floor auditorium was remodeled for the Life Long Learning Center.
