= Hyman S. Lehman =

American gunsmith (1903–1990)

Hyman S. Lebman
- Born: January 22, 1903; Odesa, Ukraine
- Died: September 22, 1990 (aged 87); San Antonio, Texas, U.S.
- Other name: Hyman S. Lehman; Hymie Lebman
- Occupation: Gunsmith; Leather worker
- Years active: 1930-1976
- Known for: Specialized, custom-made weaponry
- Children: 2

Hyman S. Lebman aka Hyman S. Lehman or Hymie Lebman (January 22, 1903 – September 22, 1990) was a Ukrainian-American gunsmith and leather worker based in San Antonio, Texas. Working out of his saddlery shop and gun store at 111 South Flores Street in San Antonio, Lebman provided specialized and custom-made weaponry to several well-known bank robbers and outlaws during the Great Depression.

United States court documents refer to Lehman as Hyman Saul Lebman. Lebman's eldest son, Marvin Lebman (September 10, 1927 – July 16, 2016), who worked with his father in his gun and saddlery shop from 1937 to 1976, spelled his father's name as Lebman.

== Biography ==
Born in Odesa, Ukraine on January 22, 1903 to Jewish parents who would later immigrate with their son to the United States, and go on to become a prominent Texas family, Hyman Saul Lebman became an accomplished gunsmith and leather worker. Before his family moved to Texas, Lebman and his parents lived in St. Louis, Missouri for a time, where Hyman's sister Sarah was born in 1906.

It is not known when exactly the Lebman family moved to Texas. During the 1930s, he opened a gun store and saddlery shop at 111 S. Flores Street in San Antonio. Lebman was frequently asked by his customers to secure unusual weapons, including the Thompson submachine gun built by Colt, which at the time could be ordered through the mail and purchased at gun or hardware stores. Soon, Lehman began customizing Colt pistols and other small arms, including conversion into fully automatic weapons. One of his Lebman's specialties was the "Baby machine gun", a Colt Model 1911 semi-automatic pistol in .45 Automatic or .38 Super, converted to full-auto fire. This machine pistol featured an extended magazine for increased ammunition capacity, a muzzle brake or compensator, and a fore grip adapted from the more familiar Thompson submachine gun. Lebman's son Marvin described his father's development of the Colt "machine pistol" concept:

My father was Hyman S. Lebman (his name was not Harold, as quoted in the article), and I worked with him from the time I was 10 years old (1937) until he developed Alzheimers in 1976. He died in 1990. He told me many stories about the customers who he later found out were John Dillinger and Baby Face Nelson. He thought they were charming, wealthy, oil men who were interested in guns, and even invited them to his house for his wife to make them dinner when I was about 3 or 4. Our shop had a firing range in the basement, and when he was experimenting with a Model 1911 on full automatic, the 3rd or 4th round went off directly over head, through the floor, and I was visiting above at the time. It scared him so much that he invented and installed a compensator on the muzzle to control the recoil. At one time much later, when I was visiting Washington, DC, I made an appointment with the FBI, and they were happy to bring out their collection of my dad's guns for me to see.

Lebman continued to sell his machine pistols and other automatic weapons until the passage of the National Firearms Act in 1934. When Chicago bootlegger Roger "The Terrible" Touhy was arrested in Wisconsin on July 19, 1933, one of Lebman's "baby machine guns" was found in his car. Pretty Boy Floyd, John Dillinger, and several known associates of the Dillinger gang were also customers. A full-auto Lebman Colt belonging to Dillinger was found at one of his hideouts in St. Paul, Minnesota, on March 31, 1934, as well as one left behind at the Little Bohemia Lodge three weeks later.

His most infamous customer was perhaps Baby Face Nelson, whose earliest known purchase of weapons from Lehman occurred while visiting San Antonio in early 1933. Lebman, who always maintained that he knew nothing of his customers' gangster connections, did business with Nelson and the Dillinger gang for another year and a half. In November 1933, Lebman had Baby Face Nelson, Nelson's wife, and Nelson's henchman Homer Van Meter at his home for Thanksgiving. Less than two weeks later, Tommy Carroll was sent by Nelson to pick up a shipment from Lebman. Carroll was forced to turn back upon reaching San Antonio when, on February 11, 1934, he shot and killed Detective H.C. Perrow.

A month later, Nelson used one of his special automatics to kill federal agent W. Carter Baum and seriously wound two others during the shootout with authorities at the Little Bohemia Lodge on April 22. Although this gun was never recovered, the FBI were able to trace the gun left behind by Dillinger by its serial number to the Colt factory in Hartford, Connecticut. From there, authorities followed the trail to a large Fort Worth pawn shop and firearms distributor, Wolfe & Klar, who sold the unmodified weapon to Hyman Lebman. There was no federal law against civilian ownership or manufacturing of machine guns at that time, and the National Firearms Act was passed only a few weeks later. Prosecutors did consider charging Lebman with possession of a .45 pistol given to him by another gangster that was later traced as stolen from a U.S. military armory, but could never establish that Lebman knew of the gun's actual origin. By furnishing the FBI with a trail of traceable and unusual weapons, Lebman's activities contributed to the eventual downfall of Nelson and several other gangsters.

Lebman continued to face legal problems. He was tried for violation of a Texas state law passed in October 1933, which restricted possession of machine guns. Lebman was initially convicted of violating that law in 1935 and sentenced to five years imprisonment. He later won an appeal and his second trial resulted in a jury deadlock, and Lebman never served a day in prison. Federal prosecutors suspected jury tampering in the retrial, specifically with the lone holdout juror, but were never able to offer any evidence to support their suspicions. Despite a five-year effort to reopen the case, the Texas state attorney refused to hold a third trial. The case was eventually dismissed in 1941.

In 1976, after developing Alzheimer's disease, Lebman retired from gunsmithing and stopped selling firearms, reportedly after pressure from the federal Bureau of Alcohol, Tobacco and Firearms. Lebman died in 1990. Lebman's son Marvin continued to sell custom leather boots, saddles, and Western wear from the Flores Street shop until the shop closed for good in 1995.
