= Park Inn Hotel =

Buildings in Mason City, Iowa

- U.S. National Register of Historic Places
- U.S. Historic district – Contributing property
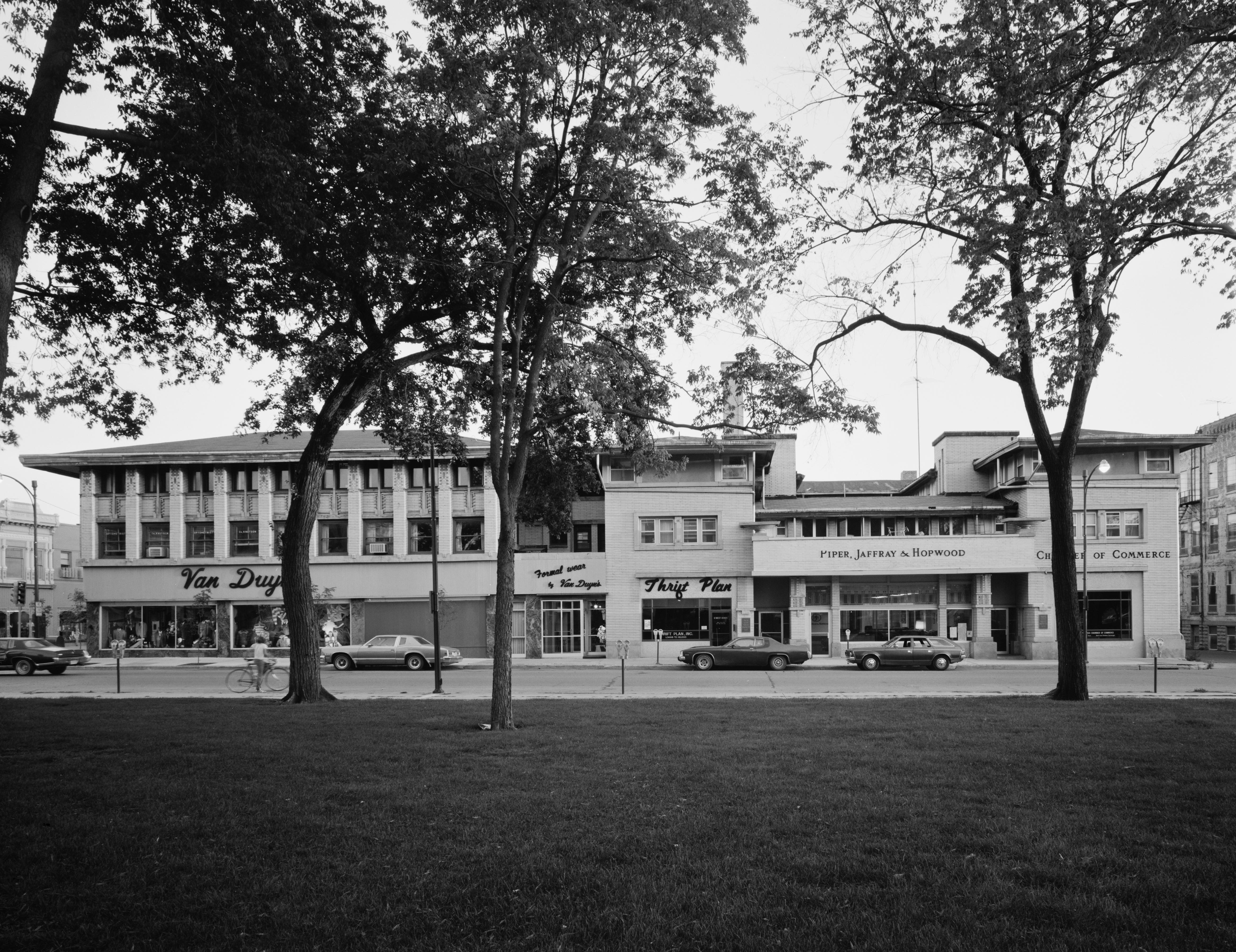
- Front of the Historic Park Inn Hotel (right) and side of the City National Bank Building (left

- Location within Iowa Location within the United States
- Location: 15 W. State St. Mason City, Iowa
- Coordinates: 43°09′05.7″N 93°12′06″W
- Architect: Frank Lloyd Wright
- Architectural style: Prairie School
- Part of: Mason City Downtown Historic District (ID05000956)
- NRHP reference No.: 72000470
- Added to NRHP: September 14, 1972

The Historic Park Inn Hotel and City National Bank are two adjacent commercial buildings in downtown Mason City, Iowa, United States, designed in the Prairie School style by Frank Lloyd Wright. Completed in 1910, the Park Inn Hotel is the last remaining Frank Lloyd Wright-designed hotel in the world, of the six for which he was the architect of record. The City National Bank is one of only two remaining Frank Lloyd Wright-designed banks in the world. It was the first Frank Lloyd Wright-designed project in the state of Iowa, and today carries both major architectural and historical significance. In 1999, the Park Inn Hotel was named on the Iowa Historic Preservation Alliance's Most Endangered Properties List.

The Park Inn Hotel was the third hotel designed by Wright and served as the prototype for Midway Gardens in Chicago and the Imperial Hotel, Tokyo, which was torn down in 1968.

== Construction ==
In 1907, when law partners James E. Blythe and J. E. E. Markley were looking for an architect to compete in quality with the eight-story bank building that would be built across the corner, they awarded a commission to Frank Lloyd Wright, a young architect who was building a reputation in the Chicago area. For them Wright would build a complex, multi-purpose building that would give them multiple income streams. Their law offices would be on the second floor of the building's narrower central waist and the hotel's east wing, surrounded on the south by a two-story banking room with rental office space above. On the north would be a 42-room hotel, with basement shops beneath the bank and hotel. Wright managed to pack all these functions into an aesthetically well-integrated building that architecturally would be the bridge between Wright's Prairie School period and his Midway Gardens and the Imperial Hotel to follow.

Wright's drawings of the bank and hotel are dated from as early as December 17, 1908. Construction began on April 1, 1909, with supervision by Wright until his departure for Europe in late October of that year. At that time, architect William Drummond, from Wright's Oak Park Studio in Oak Park, Illinois, took over supervision of the construction. During his subsequent visits, Drummond was commissioned to design a Prairie style home for a prominent Mason City family, not far away.

The law office of developer-owners Blythe and Markley opened for business on August 29, 1910. The gala opening of the new hotel and bank buildings was two weeks later, on September 10. A month later, Wright returned to the Midwest from his year in Europe.

== Use and deterioration ==
Despite its central location and modern design, the building had cost too much, and the return on investment was too little. During its first ten years, the hotel seldom made a profit. By 1922, the business was barely afloat, and the restaurant was closed more than it was open. Then, the neighboring 250-room Hotel Eadmar opened, driving the 43-room Park Inn Hotel into bankruptcy. The Park Inn closed permanently in 1925. That year also saw the closure and liquidation of the City National Bank, which was absorbed into another bank that also failed shortly thereafter.

By early 1926, the former City National Bank building and the former Park Inn Hotel were sold as separate properties. The old bank building was remodeled and reopened in 1928. The two upper floors of the Park Inn reopened as low-cost apartments, the Frank Lloyd Wright Apartments East and West. For the next 45 years, the ground floor hosted various businesses; for a brief period in the early 1970s, it was a strip club. In 1972, the few remaining tenants were evicted For the next 25 years, the building stood empty. Derelict and neglected, city residents and city leaders debated what to do with the building, as Wright's name was not significant to most people in Mason City. At the time, the Park Inn Hotel was the only remaining hotel of six Wright had designed in his lifetime.

In 2008 a documentary film about the hotel was released. It was produced by Travelfilm Company and McMar Ltd/28, was written by Garry McGee and Lucille Carra, and directed by Lucille Carra. It was researched and filmed over a seven-year period. The film explores the history of the Mason City Bank and Hotel Commission (1908), as well as the struggles of the rural city of Mason City, Iowa to restore the property.

== Renovation ==
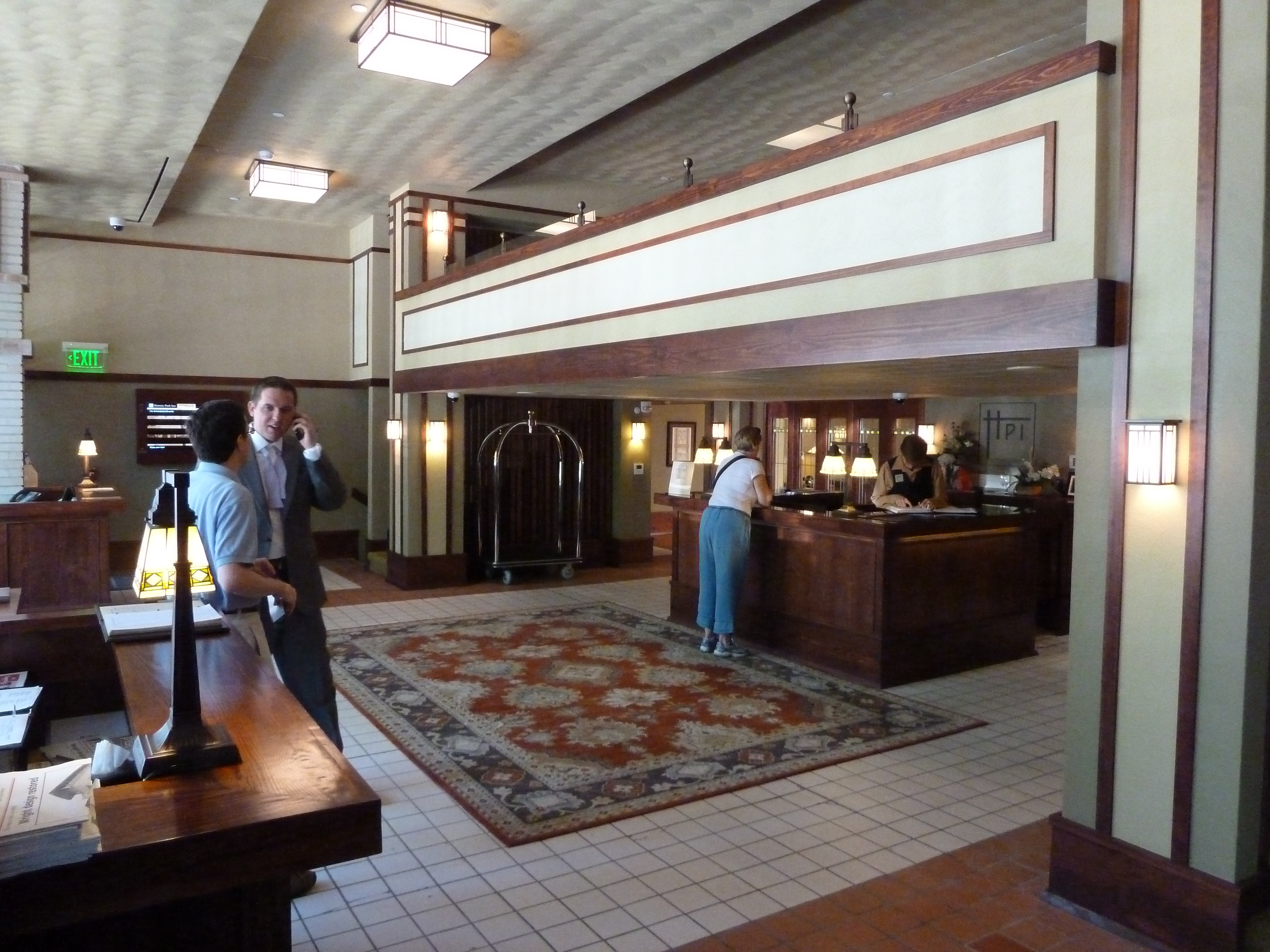
The restored lobby of the Historic Park Inn.

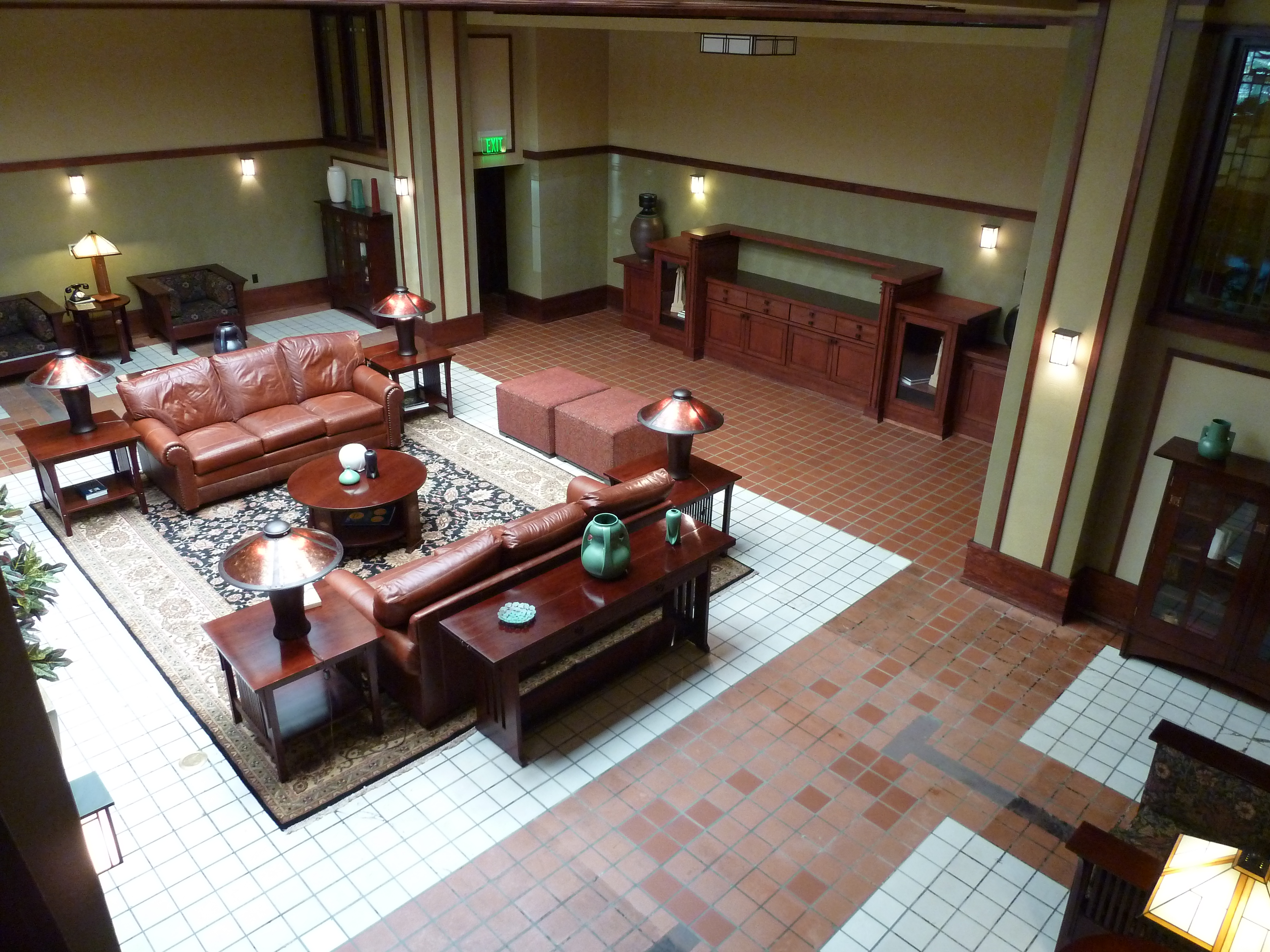
The restored Skylight Room of the Historic Park Inn.

The Park Inn Hotel received a complete interior and exterior renovation; this included a comprehensive restoration of the brick and terra-cotta façade, replacement of the art glass skylight windows, and a complete interior reconstruction. Wright on the Park, Inc., the organization overseeing the work, purchased the adjacent City Bank Building and reunited the Park Inn Hotel with the City National Bank. The bank building was refitted with an elevator and provides six additional rooms for the hotel; the old bank lobby is now a hotel ballroom.

The restoration was completed in September 2011.

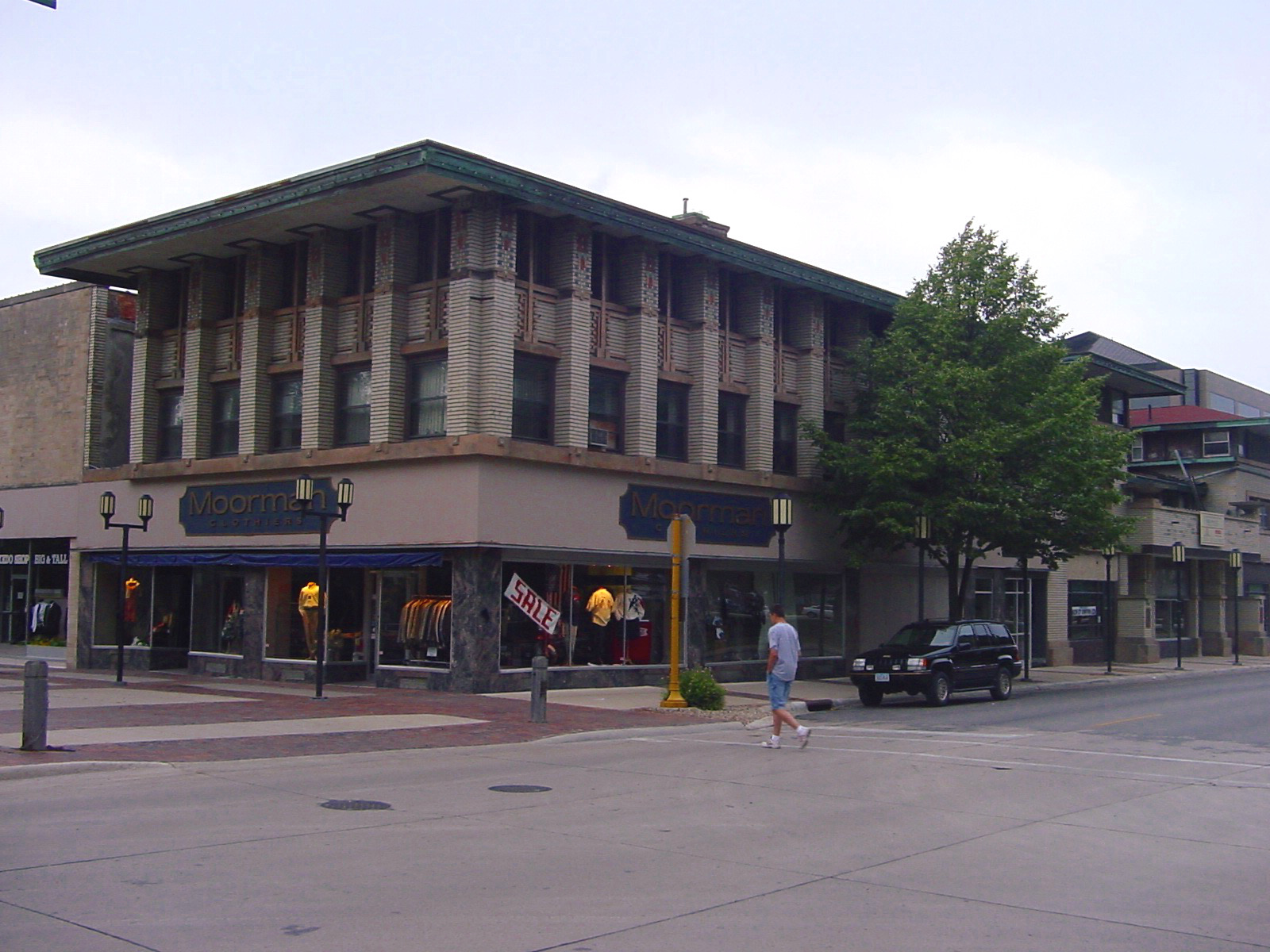

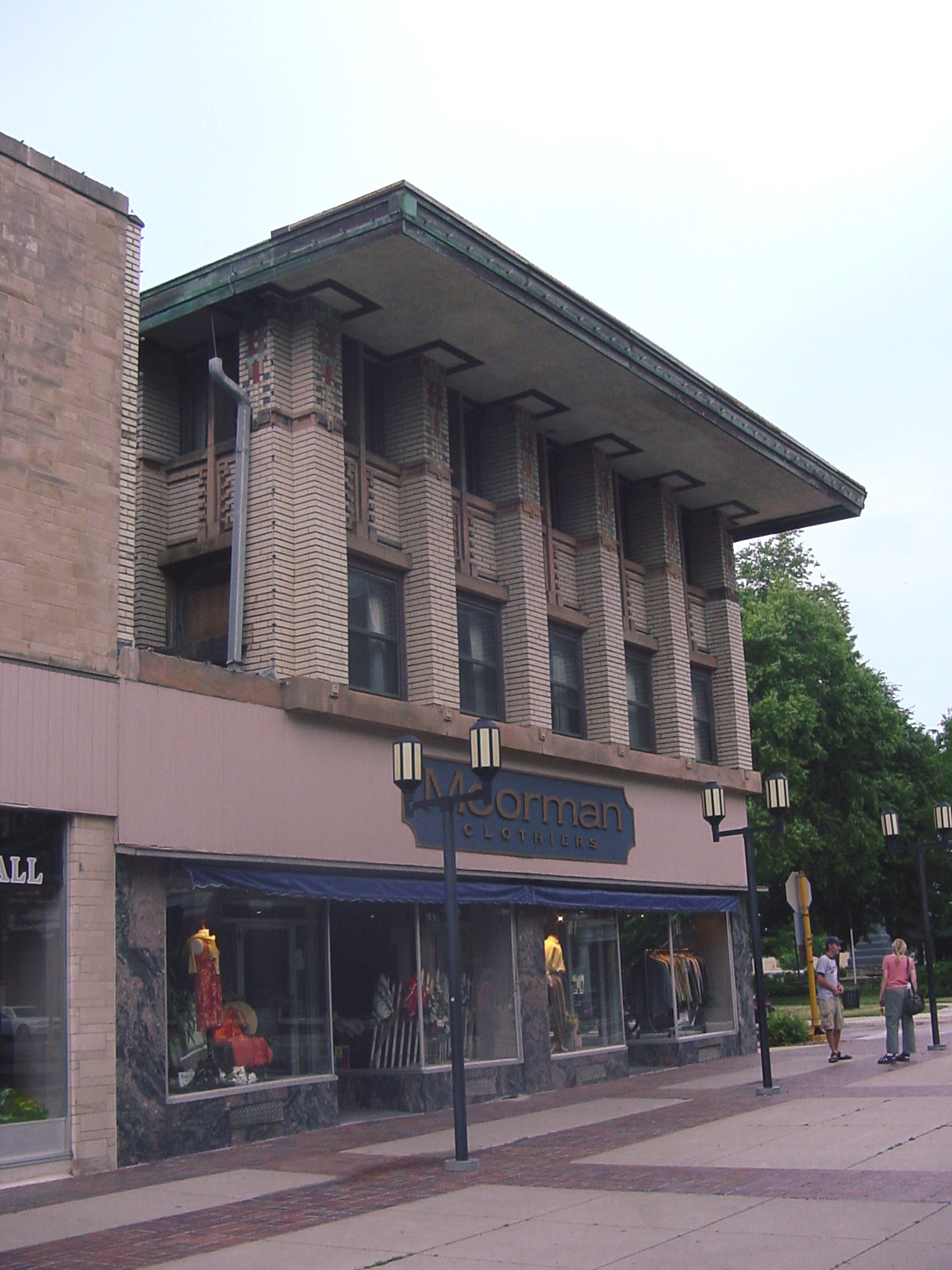

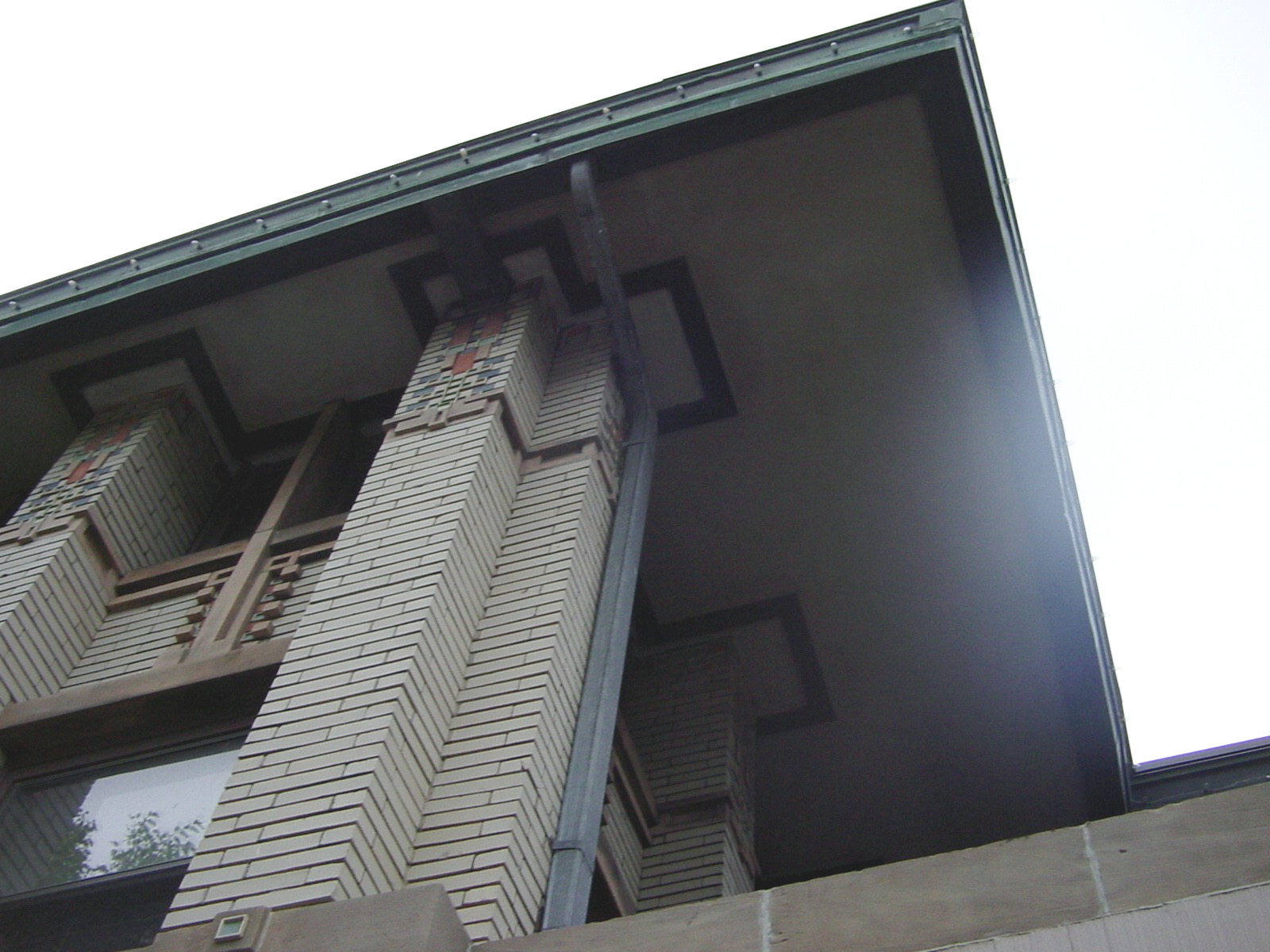

== See also ==
- List of Frank Lloyd Wright works

== Notes ==
- Storrer, William Allin (1993). The Frank Lloyd Wright Companion. Chicago: University of Chicago Press. ISBN 978-0-226-77624-8. (S.155)
