= Fort Dodge Downtown Historic District =

Historic district in Iowa, United States

- U.S. National Register of Historic Places
- U.S. Historic district
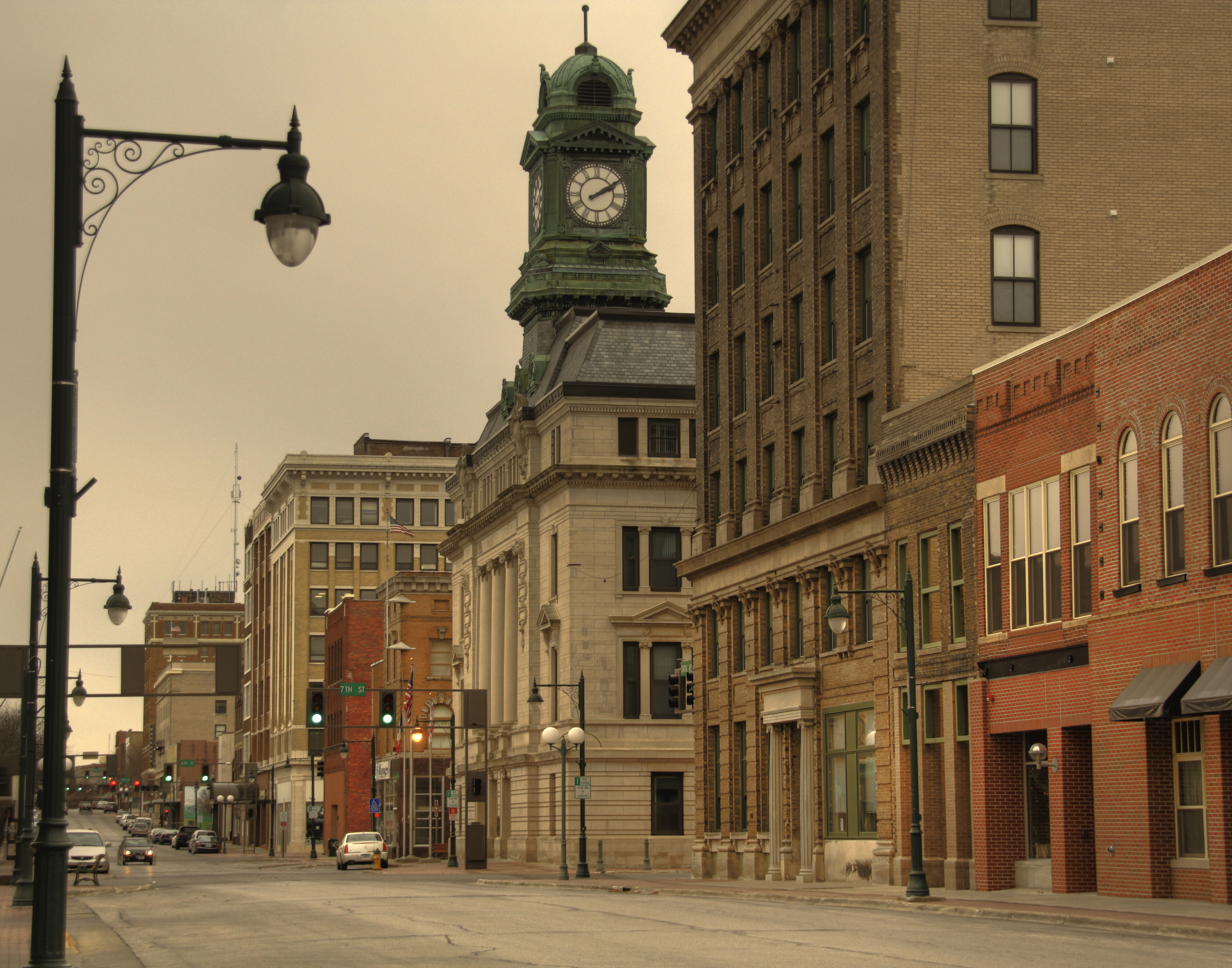

- Location within Iowa Location within the United States
- Location: 1st Ave. N., Central Ave., and 1st Ave. S. from 3rd St. on the west to 12th St. on east, Fort Dodge, Iowa
- Coordinates: 42°30′18″N 94°11′15″W
- Built by: Anthony Steinhoff
- Architect: Liebbe, Nourse & Rasmussen; Proudfoot, Bird & Rawson
- Architectural style: Late Victorian; Late 19th and 20th Century Revivals
- NRHP reference No.: 10000918
- Added to NRHP: November 10, 2010

Fort Dodge Downtown Historic District is a nationally recognized historic district located in Fort Dodge, Iowa, United States. It was listed on the National Register of Historic Places in 2010. Additional documentation for the district was approved by the National Park Service on January 4, 2019. At the time of its nomination it contained 177 resources, which included 100 contributing buildings, one contributing site, one contributing structure, five contributing objects, 64 non-contributing buildings, three non-contributing structures, and three non-contributing objects. The district covers the city's central business district, mainly along Central Avenue, but also along the adjoining streets as well. Commercial development in the district began with the city's original plat in 1854 and continued through the opening of the Crossroads Mall in 1964. Webster County Courthouse (1902), First National Bank Building (1908), and the Wahkonsa Hotel (1910) are all located in the district and are individually listed on the National Register.

Buildings usage in the district varies widely and includes commercial, light industrial, residential, religious, governmental, social, and educational functions. There is also a wide variety of architectural styles that reflect the era in which the buildings were constructed. The oldest building in the district is the Reynolds Block (1882) which marks the transition of the business district from the wood-frame structures of its settlement period to masonry constriction. A building boom in the early 20th-century replaced many of the cities older commercial buildings. Building heights range from single story structures to eight stories. Two prominent Des Moines architectural firms, Liebbe, Nourse & Rasmussen and Proudfoot, Bird & Rawson, designed buildings in the district, as did several other architects. The contributing site is the Public Square, the contributing structure is the foundation of a building that was torn down, and the contributing objects include two memorials/drinking fountains and three neon signs.
