= Crawford House (Des Moines, Iowa) =

Historic house in Iowa, United States

- U.S. National Register of Historic Places
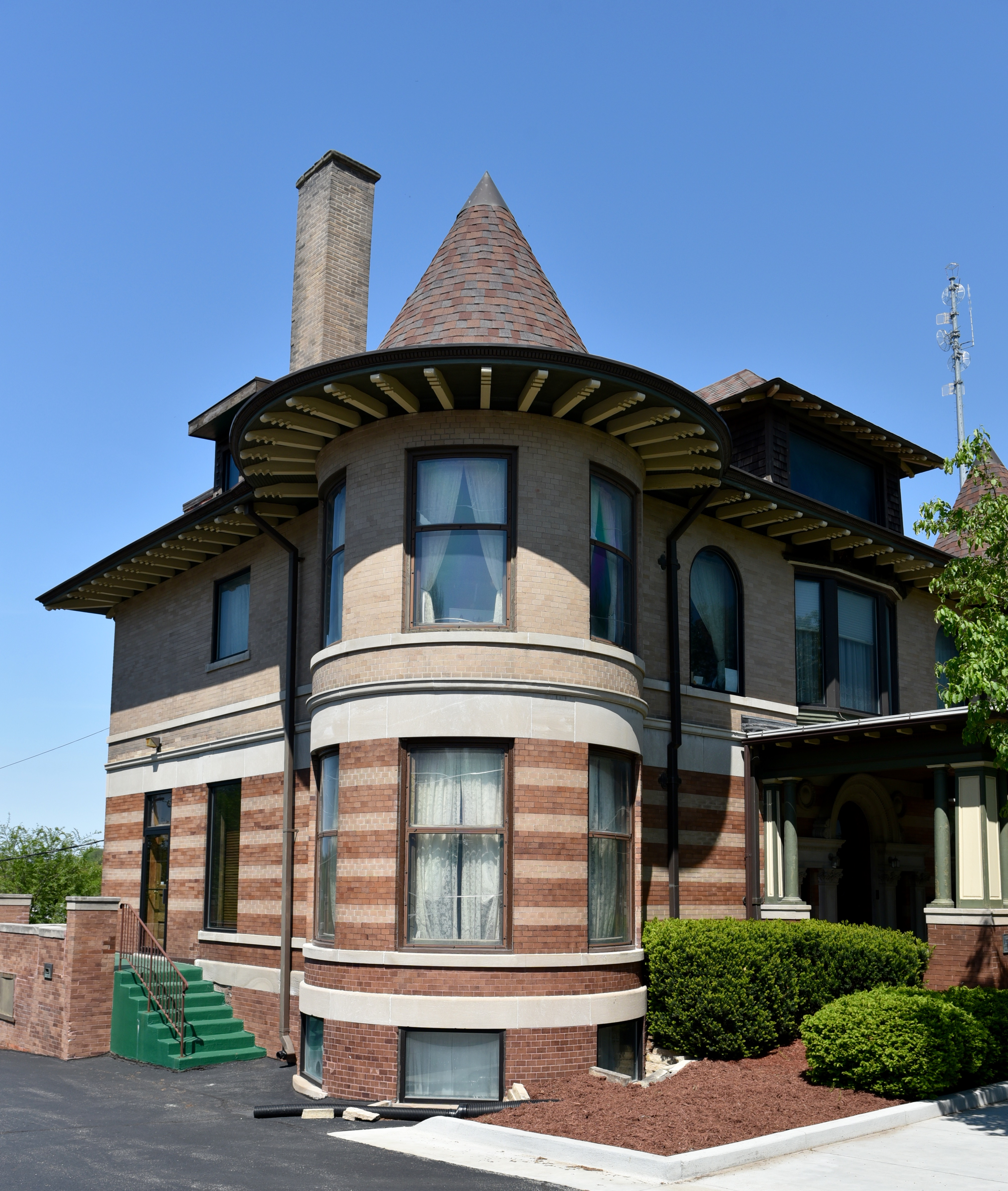

- Location within Iowa Location within the United States
- Location: 2203 Grand Ave. Des Moines, Iowa
- Coordinates: 41°35′05.3″N 93°38′50.9″W
- Area: less than one acre
- Built: 1896
- Architect: Liebbe, Nourse & Rasmussen
- NRHP reference No.: 83000398
- Added to NRHP: January 27, 1983

The Crawford House is a historic building located in Des Moines, Iowa, United States. R.A. Crawford was a local banker who hired the Des Moines architectural firm of Liebbe, Nourse & Rasmussen to design this house, which was completed in 1896. It is located in a section of the city that contains other large residences that calls attention to the city's economic expansion. The 2½-story, brick structure is a combination of the Queen Anne and the Neoclassical styles. It features alternating colors of brick, limestone stringcourses, and two round towers with conical roofs that flank the main facade. The single-family home was converted into a funeral home in 1945. The house was listed on the National Register of Historic Places in 1983.
