= The Kirk (Mason City, Iowa) =

- U.S. National Register of Historic Places
- U.S. Historic district – Contributing property
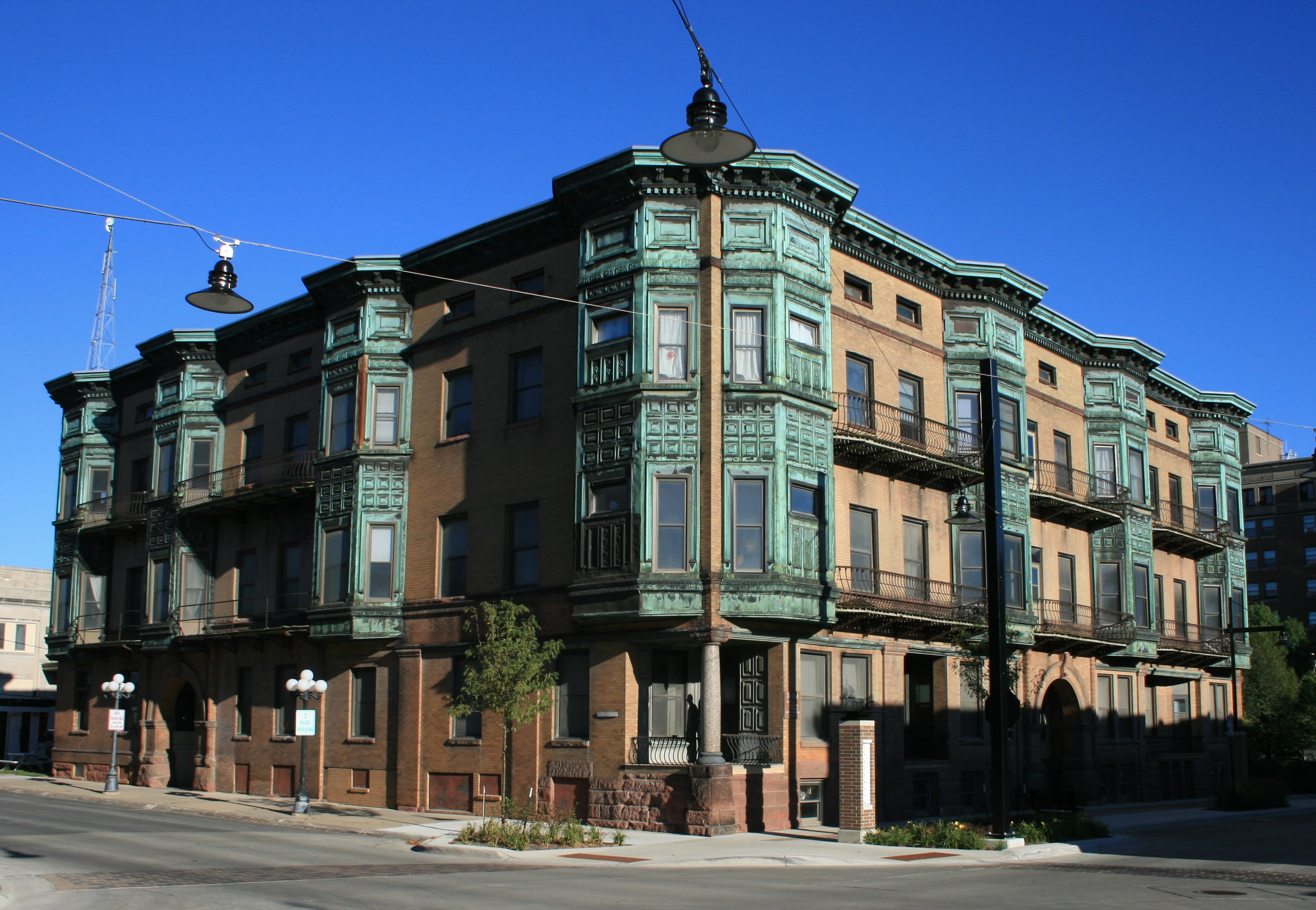

- Location within Iowa Location within the United States
- Location: 206 N. Federal Ave. Mason City, Iowa
- Coordinates: 43°09′13.8″N 93°12′05.1″W
- Area: less than one acre
- Built: 1903
- Architectural style: Late Victorian
- Part of: Mason City Downtown Historic District (ID05000956)
- NRHP reference No.: 82002613
- Added to NRHP: April 12, 1982

The Kirk was a historic building located in Mason City, Iowa, United States. Completed in 1903, this was the city's first luxury apartment building. Horace P Kirk, who owned and managed the building, was a Mason City businessman, photographer, and civic leader. He built two other buildings here and to the north that were destroyed in a fire in 1902. This building was built on the site of Kirkland Flats, and parts of its stone foundation and north wall may be from the H.P. Kirk wholesale building that had been built in 1892. Originally The Kirk supplied heat, light, and water for the apartments with its own steam generating plant. It subsequently acquired city utilities. The building featured an eclectic design that was organized into horizontal and vertical elements. The horizontal was realized in wide brick bands on the floors. The vertical was realized in the copper-clad oriel windows that tied the second and third floors to the cornice. The building was individually listed on the National Register of Historic Places in 1982, and as a contributing property in the Mason City Downtown Historic District in 2005.

The building was destroyed in a fire on April 24, 2023.
