= Washington and Elizabeth Miller Tract–Center-Soll Community Historic District =

- Washington and Elizabeth Miller Tract–Center-Soll Community; Historic District
- U.S. National Register of Historic Places
- U.S. Historic district
- Location within Iowa Location within the United States
- Location: Roughly 35th to 38th Sts. between 3500–3607 Grand Ave. to Center St., Des Moines, Iowa
- Coordinates: 41°35′20″N 93°40′03″W
- Area: approximately 70 acres (28 ha)
- Built by: A.J. Coon
- Architect: Wetherell and Harrison; Liebbe, Nourse and Rasmussen
- NRHP reference No.: 100000490
- Added to NRHP: January 17, 2017

The Washington and Elizabeth Miller Tract–Center-Soll Community Historic District is a nationally recognized historic district located in Des Moines, Iowa, United States. At the time of its nomination it consisted of 471 resources, which included 297 contributing buildings and 174 non-contributing buildings. It was listed on the National Register of Historic Places in 2017.

The historic district is a late-nineteenth and early-twentieth-century middle-class residential neighborhood. It was developed by the Miller family who had previously farmed the land and operated a nursery there. The neighborhood was built along the Ingersoll streetcar route. Once developed the residents formed the Center-Soll Community Association, which "sought to increase neighborly relations, market the neighborhood, protect property values, and keep out commercial intrusions north of Ingersoll Avenue." Better Homes & Gardens featured the association in 1924, and it was considered a replicable model for other communities.

The houses in the district were built from the 1890s to the 1920s and there were constructed in the popular styles of the era. Local contractor A.J. Coon was responsible for many of the houses. Most of the non-contributing resources are garages, but a few of the houses were built outside of the period of significance or were extensively remodeled. Local architectural firms Wetherell and Harrison and Liebbe, Nourse and Rasmussen were responsible for the apartment and commercial buildings in the district.
