= First Church of Christ, Scientist (Mason City, Iowa) =

Coordinates: 43.154°N 93.202°W

- First Church of Christ Scientist
- U.S. National Register of Historic Places
- U.S. Historic district – Contributing property
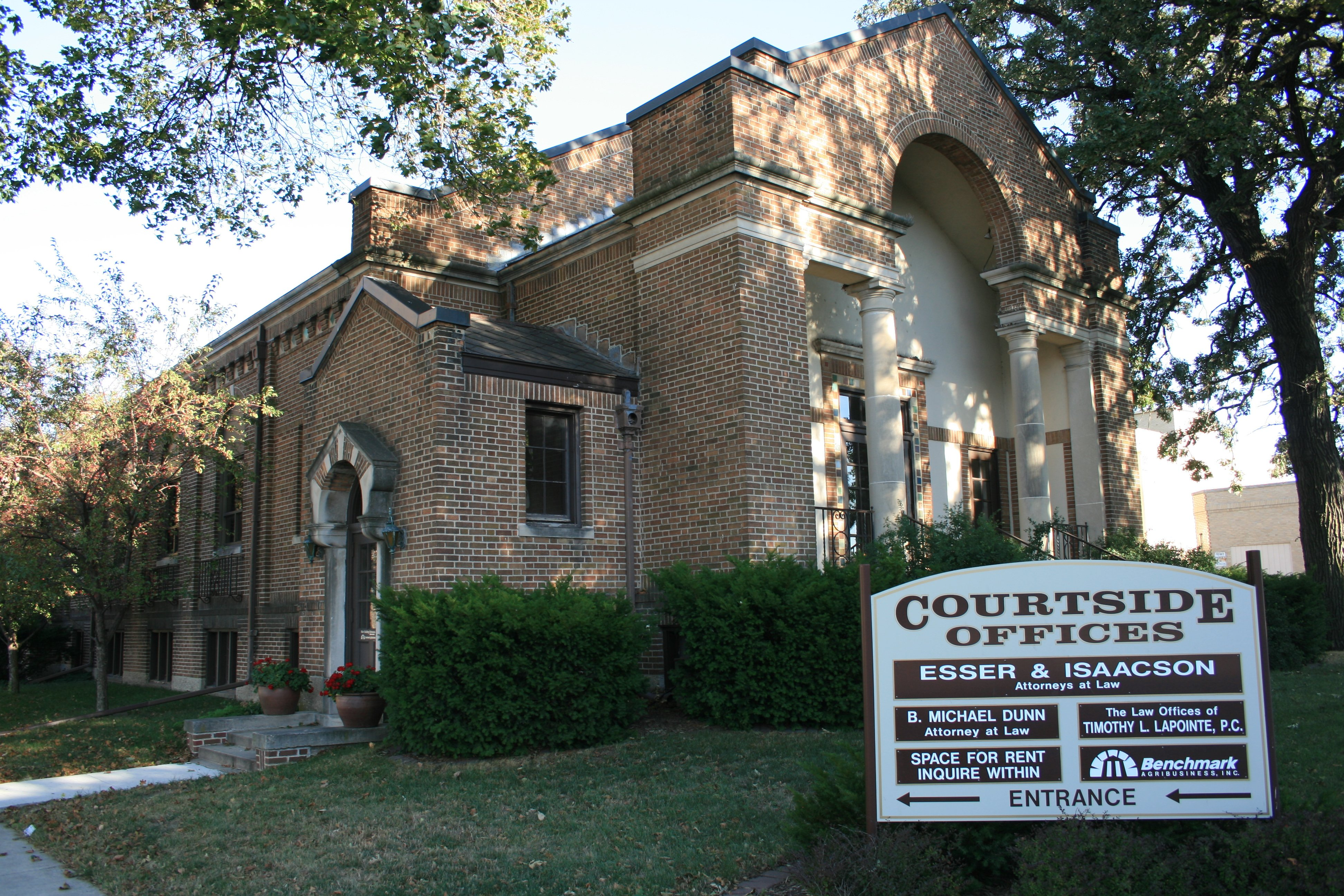
- Location: 23 Third St., NW; Mason City, Iowa
- Built: 1928
- Architect: Clyde W. Smith
- Part of: Mason City Downtown Historic District (ID05000956)
- NRHP reference No.: 97001285
- Added to NRHP: October 30, 1997

The former First Church of Christ, Scientist, located at 23 3rd Street, N.W. in Mason City, Iowa, is a historic structure that was added to the National Register of Historic Places in 1997, and as a contributing property in the Mason City Downtown Historic District in 2005. It was designed by Minneapolis architect Clyde W. Smith and was deemed significant as a notable example of 1920s architectural eclecticism. It includes elements of Romanesque and Gothic Revival styles. Further, according to its NRHP nomination: "The design of the building reflects the propensity of Christian Scientists to break with traditional church planning and design. The building features no symbols, icons or other typical religious ornamentation that would be representative of a religious hall. Instead it reflects an 'advance design' exhibited in the highest quality construction techniques and standards of the era."

It now houses professional offices.

== See also ==
- List of former Christian Science churches, societies and buildings
- National Register of Historic Places listings in Cerro Gordo County, Iowa
