= Kromer Flats =

- U.S. National Register of Historic Places
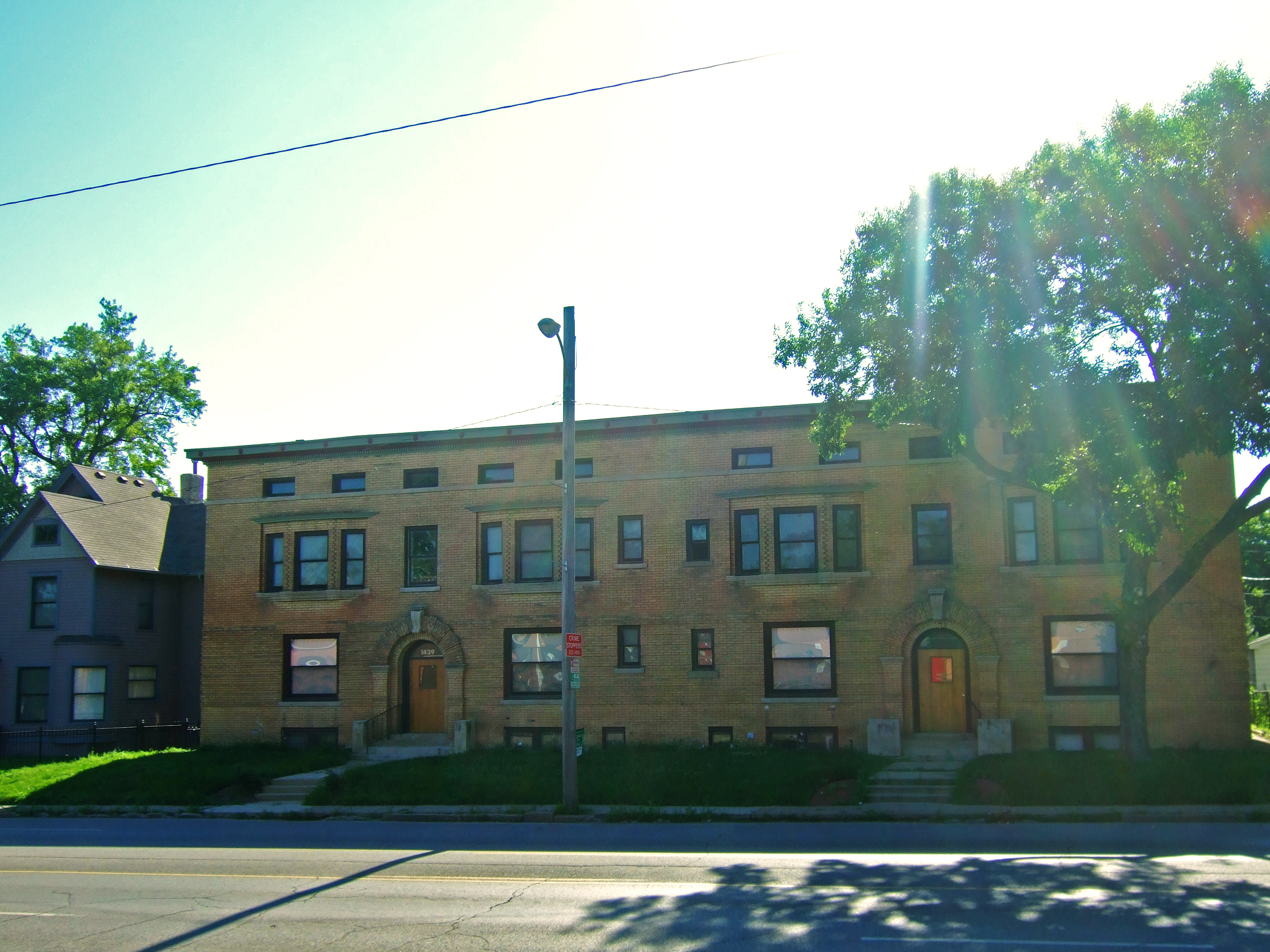

- Location within Iowa Location within the United States
- Location: 1433-1439 6th Ave. Des Moines, Iowa
- Coordinates: 41°36′18.6″N 93°37′31.7″W
- Area: less than one acre
- Built: 1905
- Architect: Liebbe, Nourse & Rasmussen
- Architectural style: Renaissance Revival
- MPS: Towards a Greater Des Moines MPS
- NRHP reference No.: 96001151
- Added to NRHP: October 25, 1996

Kromer Flats, also known as the Drummond Apartments, is a historic building located in Des Moines, Iowa, United States. This 2½-story, brick structure was completed in 1905. It features Renaissance Revival design elements, a flat roof, orange-yellow brick, cast concrete trim, four oriel windows on the main facade, two level porches in the rear, a two-story bay on both the north and south elevations, and three air shafts that penetrate the buildings from the rear. It originally had four apartments on each floor. The building is located on Sixth Avenue, which by the turn of the 20th century had become a major route utilized by vehicular traffic and streetcar lines. Its proximity to this transportation corridor illustrates the emergence of higher and denser residential use in this area of Des Moines. It is also significant for its association with the Des Moines architectural firm of Liebbe, Nourse & Rasmussen who designed it. The apartment building was listed on the National Register of Historic Places in 1996.
