= The Oaklands Historic District =

Historic district in Iowa, United States

- U.S. National Register of Historic Places
- U.S. Historic district
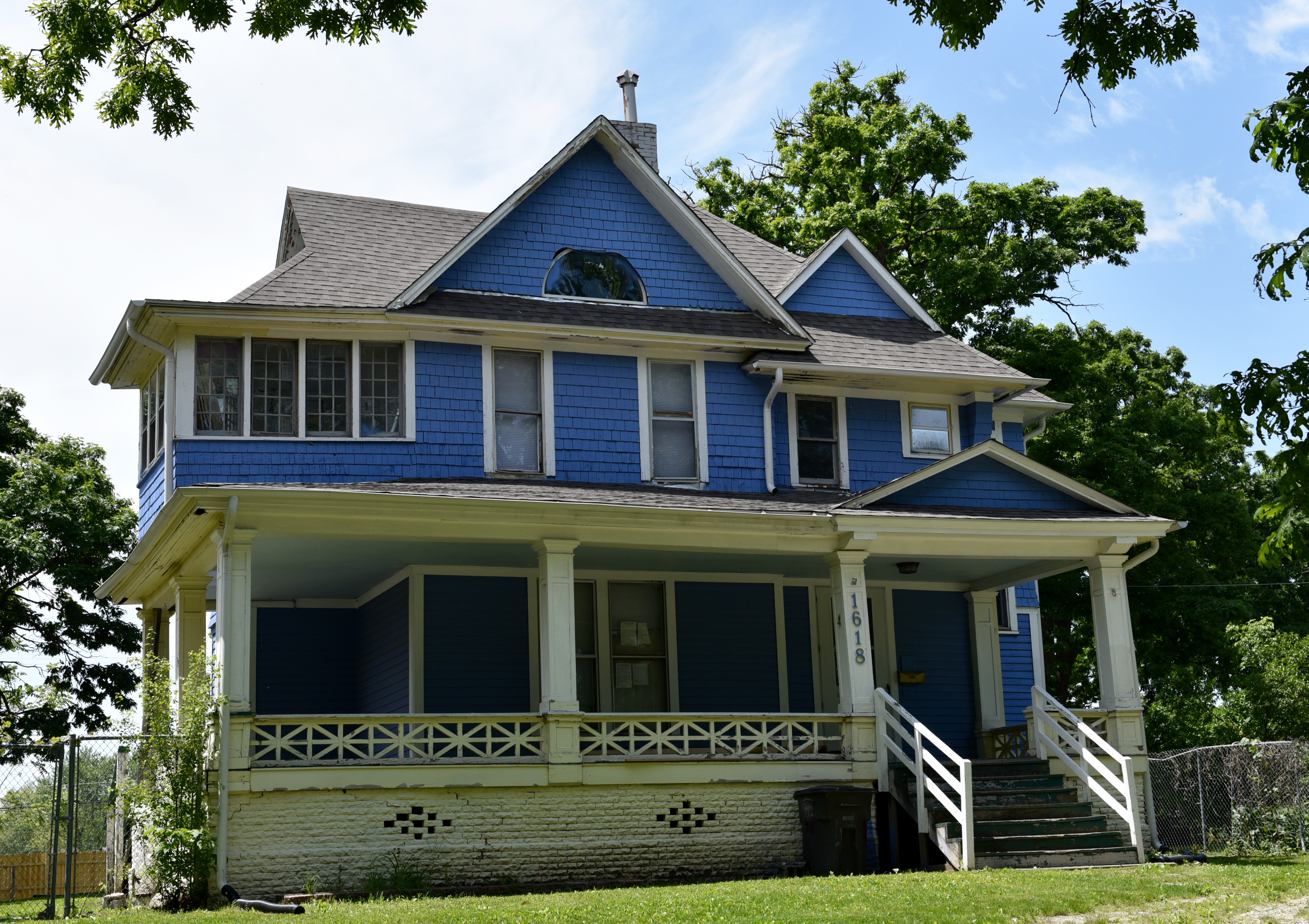
- A house within the district on Oakland Avenue

- Location within Iowa Location within the United States
- Location: Oakland and Arlington Aves. between Franklin and College Aves. Des Moines, Iowa
- Coordinates: 41°36′34″N 93°37′22″W
- Area: 38 acres (15 ha)
- Architect: Liebbe, Nourse & Rasmussen; C.C. Cross & Company
- Architectural style: Colonial Revival; Tudor Revival; Queen Anne
- MPS: Towards a Greater Des Moines MPS
- NRHP reference No.: 96001155
- Added to NRHP: October 25, 1996

The Oaklands Historic District is located in Des Moines, Iowa, United States. It was a late 19th-century residential area for upper and upper middle class residents of what was then a suburb of North Des Moines. It was also the first naturalistic suburban subdivision in the Des Moines area. The district has been listed on the National Register of Historic Places since 1996. It is part of the Towards a Greater Des Moines MPS.

== History ==
The Oaklands represents the real estate boom in North Des Moines in the late 19th century. It was the largest of the city's Victorian suburbs. Places such as North Des Moines grew in popularity in the decades after the American Civil War as a way of improving housing by developing it away from the congested and the more densely populated inner city. The development of street car lines in the 1880s increased the popularity of these areas as they provided a mode of transportation to the city's central business district.

The residential area was developed by Lowry W. Goode who was Des Moines' most influential real estate developer of that period. He had the area platted in 1884 and a second plat in 1887. He lived in The Oaklands at two different addresses. Goode, along with Frank Pelton who was a Des Moines civil engineer, platted the area and created the first naturalistic suburban subdivision. They combined the scenic nature of the area along the Des Moines River and the natural tree canopy with broad streets and large lots in order to attract Des Moines’ elite. Besides his own home, Goode also built speculation houses to encourage movement to the suburb. He suffered from financial losses and legal problems resulting from the Panic of 1893. He moved to another part of the city as a result and he moved from Des Moines in 1896. He later committed suicide in Boston, Massachusetts.

== Architecture ==
The Oaklands Historic District is made up of 83 buildings, of which 58 are single-family houses and 25 are stables or garages. Thirty-seven houses are contributing properties in the historic district as are 15 of the stables and garages. The street circulation network is considered a contributing structure in the historic district.

The Oaklands includes some the largest and architecturally ambitious residences in North Des Moines that were designed by the city's leading architectural firms. Housing design and construction can be divided into three eras. The first era in the late 19th century reflected the influences of the Stick, Queen Anne and the Colonial Revival styles. The second era lasted from about 1905 to 1922. It reflected the influence of the American Craftsman, Period Revival and to a lesser extent the Prairie School. The third period began in the years after World War II and is not considered as contributing to the historic nature of the district. The Des Moines architectural firms involved in the district include Liebbe, Nourse & Rasmussen and C. C. Cross & Company.
