= Tommy Carroll (criminal) =

American bank robber and Depression-era outlaw

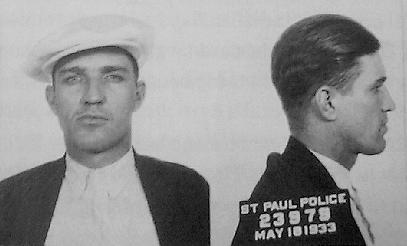
- Carroll's 1933 mugshot
- Born: Thomas Leonard Carroll; November 28, 1900; Red Lodge, Montana
- Died: June 7, 1934 (aged 33); Waterloo, Iowa
- Cause of death: Gunshot wounds
- Occupation: Bank robber
- Spouses: Viola (abandoned); Jean Angela Delaney Crompton
- Status: Paroled from Leavenworth in 1931
- Conviction: Armed robbery (1927)
- Penalty: 5 years imprisonment

Thomas Leonard Carroll (November 28, 1900 – June 7, 1934) was an American bank robber and Depression-era outlaw. A boxer-turned-criminal, he committed numerous robberies during the 1920s and 1930s, and was a longtime member of the Dillinger gang.

== Biography ==
=== Early life and criminal career ===
An ex-boxer, who once had his jaw broken in the ring, giving him a "lantern-jaw" appearance, Carroll served in World War I. He was first arrested on January 24, 1920, and served 60 days in the Douglas County, Nebraska jail "for investigation." On October 24, 1921, Carroll was arrested for larceny in Council Bluffs, Iowa and remained in jail for nearly four months before his conviction on February 7, 1922. Sentenced to five years imprisonment, he spent a year in the Anamosa state reformatory before his parole in March 1923.

He continued to have run-ins with the law during the next few years, managing to avoid more jail time. He was twice charged with robbery, first in Kansas City on November 21, 1924 and again in St. Louis on August 11, 1925, and both cases were dropped. The following year, on August 28, 1926, he was jailed in St. Louis for auto theft but released without trial. He was picked up by police in Tulsa, Oklahoma for carrying a concealed weapon on September 15, but the charges were dropped. Returned to St. Joseph, he was arrested for bank robbery on September 29, 1926, and held until his trial and acquittal on January 11, 1927.

On April 1, 1927, Carroll's luck ran out when he was convicted of armed robbery in Missouri and sentenced to five years imprisonment at the state prison in Jefferson City. He was later released on parole, but only a brief time as he was quickly rearrested, tried and convicted under the newly passed Dyer Act and spent 21 months in Leavenworth prison until his parole in October 1931.

Carroll disappeared for a year and a half before he was arrested in St. Paul, Minnesota, on May 17, 1933 for possession of burglar's tools. Carroll was able to negotiate his release and the charges against him were dropped. It was after this experience that Carroll became determined to break into major crime with a skilled team.

=== Carroll and the Dillinger gang ===
Carroll joined the John Dillinger gang sometime in late-1933 and participated in his first robbery with the gang on October 23, 1933, when he joined Baby Face Nelson, Homer Van Meter, John Paul Chase and Charles Fisher in the robbery of $32,000 from a bank in Brainerd, Minnesota. On November 11, he was spotted and pursued by two Minneapolis detectives, managing to escape. Carroll soon after traveled to San Antonio, Texas to purchase weapons from gunsmith Hyman Lehman on behalf of Nelson and the others. Carroll was forced to return when a chance encounter with police turned into a shootout, leaving Detective H.C. Perrow dead.

In February 1934, Carroll was sent by Homer Van Meter to Crown Point, Indiana, to deliver a "cash payment" to help break John Dillinger from the local jail. Carroll was not yet an associate of Dillinger's and was easily able to pass through the town without notice. On March 3, Dillinger escaped from Crown Point and went to St. Paul where he met Carroll. Three days later, he joined Carroll, Van Meter, Nelson, John "Red" Hamilton and Eddie Green in stealing $49,500 from a bank in Sioux Falls, South Dakota. Carroll was assigned to watch the street and captured twelve police officers single-handed. Nelson, however, shot and wounded motorcycle officer Hale Keith before they made their getaway back to St. Paul.

Carroll was the wheelman a week later when the gang made their biggest score yet: on March 13, they robbed First National Bank in Mason City, Iowa of $52,344. Dillinger and Hamilton both suffered gunshot wounds when they left the bank and the gang fled to St. Paul. The robbery had attracted so much attention that they couldn't risk staying in the city long and decided to disappear for a while. The gang headed for Emil Wanatka's Little Bohemia Lodge near Rhinelander, Wisconsin a month later.

The FBI followed the gang to their hideout and, on the night of April 22, Melvin Purvis led a raid against the lodge. The raid resulted in disaster, with Federal agents killing one civilian, Eugene Boisoneau, 35, from the Mercer CCC camp. Federal agents also wounded John Hoffman, 28, a gas station attendant and John Morris, 59, the Mercer CCC camp cook. Baby Face Nelson killed agent Carter Baum and wounded agent Jay Neuman and local constable Carl Christensen at Alvin Koerner's place, south of Little Bohemia. All the outlaws easily escaped.

Carroll had fled through the woods and ended up in a nearby crossroads community. He then stole a car and drove down a logging road 12 miles north of the lodge. When the road turned out to be a dead end, he left the car and escaped on foot while federal agents were arresting the women who had been found at the lodge with the gang. Carroll's wife Jean Delaney Carroll (or Crompton), sister-in-law of Alvin Karpis, was among the women arrested and charged with harboring fugitives. She was later put on probation instead of serving a jail sentence.

Carroll remained on the run with Dillinger and Van Meter for almost a month and eventually hid out in a cabin outside East Chicago, Indiana. On May 19, he and the rest of the gang were indicted by a federal grand jury in Madison, Wisconsin and charged with harboring each other as fugitives. Later that month, as the gang went their separate ways, Carroll was reunited with his wife, who violated her probation to join him.

=== Death ===
Carroll and his girlfriend, Jean Delaney (sister of Alvin Karpis' girlfriend Delores Delaney), managed to evade the authorities for only a few weeks following their departure from Dillinger. On Wednesday, June 6, 1934, they checked into the Evening Star Tourist Camp, about five miles south of Cedar Rapids, Iowa. The next morning they drove to Waterloo, Iowa, arriving at 10:30 or 11, according to Delaney's later statement, with plans to get Delaney fitted for glasses. They ate breakfast, then Delaney bought a brown dress at 226 East 4th Street, which she put on and wore away from the store. The two then went to get Delaney's glasses. Delaney later told police that she had recently dyed her hair black. She said she had done so not with a view to hide her identity, but because she was tired of blonde hair, and that they had called her "Mae West" in jail at Madison. They stopped to fill up at a gas station, then headed to a beer parlor shortly after lunch. The station attendant had noticed a collection of out-of-state license plates in the back seat of Carroll's new bronze-colored Hudson sedan, motor No. 32148, with Missouri license 53970, and called local police after they had left. The attendant gave police the make of the car and the license plate number.

(But per the 1994 version of "Dillinger: The Untold Story", pg 183, the reason was that "Carelessly they had left a machine gun on the back seat hidden under a lap robe, and an inquisitive mechanic, peering under the robe, hastened to call the police. When Carroll returned, he found policemen Emil Steffen and P.E. Walker waiting, and according to the officers' story, they shot and killed him when he reached for his gun. Two days later Jean Crompton was ordered to prison for a year and a day for violation of her parole.")

Detectives Emil Steffen and P. E. Walker began cruising about looking for the suspicious vehicle without success and had returned to the station, when suddenly the car was spotted across the street. Carroll had carelessly parked the car across from the Waterloo police garage. Steffen and Walker watched a man and a woman come out of the beer parlor and walk to the Hudson. The detectives approached. Delaney got in the car. Walker said to Carroll, "You're under arrest." "The hell I am," answered Carroll. Carroll reached for his gun, dropping it underneath the car after Walker had given him a short left to the jaw, knocking him off balance. Carroll then ran into a nearby alley. Steffen and Walker opened fire, shooting five times, with four hitting Carroll. Three lodged in his chest and one pierced the fourth lumbar vertebrae of the spine. En route to the hospital, Carroll admitted who he was to the detectives. Steffen attempted to get further information, but Carroll stated he had no statement to make, or word to send anyone, and that his parents were dead.

Reporter Francis Veach, along with John Gwynne, the Black Hawk county attorney, and assistant county attorney Burr Towne, were admitted into Carroll's room at the St. Francis Hospital. Drs. Paul O'Keefe, Wade Preece, and J. R. O'Keefe were also at the bedside. Veach asked Carroll, who was now breathing heavily, if he had anything to say. "I'm hit, Buddy. That's all. I'm hit." Veach also asked Carroll if he wanted a priest. Thanking him, Carroll said the priest had already been in his room.

Veach left the hospital and went to the county jail to interview Jean Delaney. He asked her if she had a message to take back to Carroll. "Tell him that I said not to die and that they are going to let me see him in the hospital. Tell him that I love him. He was always good and kind to me, and the things they say about him aren't true. We just stopped in Waterloo to get my glasses fitted." Veach told her he would deliver the message. When he arrived back at the hospital, he learned that Carroll had died just before he got there, about six p.m. He returned to the jail and told Delaney that her message had been delivered, "thinking it might soften the blow somewhat." Two days after Carroll's death Delaney was sentenced to a year and a day for violating her parole, and later miscarried their child. Carroll was given a Catholic funeral at the Church of the Assumption in St. Paul and was buried in Oakland Cemetery, St. Paul, Lot 279, Block 71. Carroll's grave marker has long been missing.

== In other media ==
Tommy Carroll is played by actor Spencer Garrett in the 2009 film Public Enemies. In the film he is shown being shot in the back of the head during a disastrous bank robbery in Sioux Falls, South Dakota, and is then tortured by BOI agents attempting to gain information regarding the gang's hideout. In reality, Carroll was killed by police in Waterloo, Iowa, with wounds to the chest and spine.
