= Wahkonsa Hotel =

- U.S. National Register of Historic Places
- U.S. Historic district – Contributing property
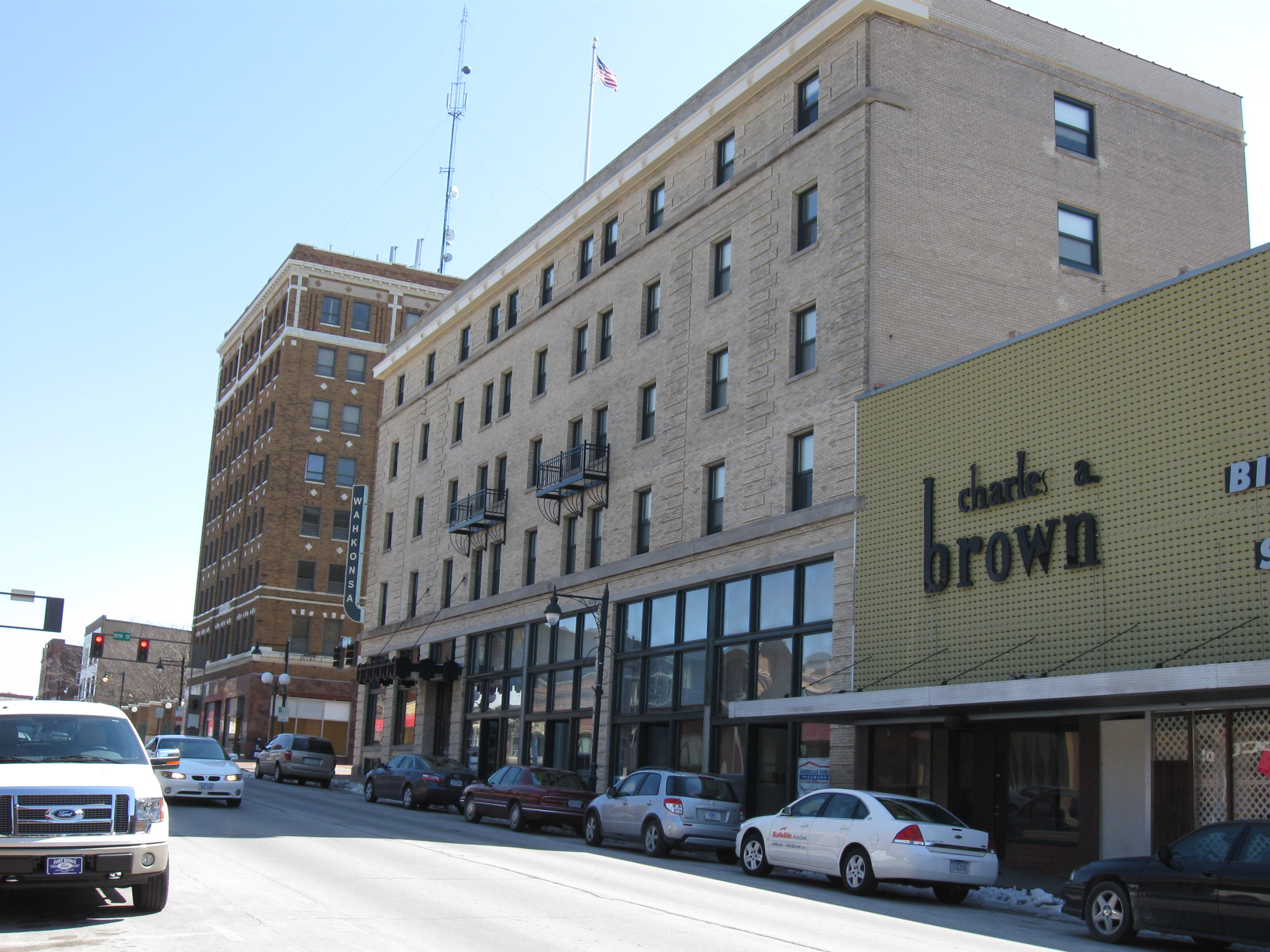

- Location within Iowa Location within the United States
- Location: 927 Central Ave. Fort Dodge, Iowa
- Coordinates: 42°30′19″N 94°11′06.5″W
- Area: less than one acre
- Built: 1910
- Architect: Liebbe, Nourse & Rasmussen
- Architectural style: Renaissance Revival
- Part of: Fort Dodge Downtown Historic District (ID10000918)
- NRHP reference No.: 08000443
- Added to NRHP: May 21, 2008

The Wahkonsa Hotel, also known as Wahkonsa Manor, is a historic building located in Fort Dodge, Iowa, United States. It was built by the city's Commercial Club to provide a first-class hotel for the community. The five story, brick, Renaissance Revival-style structure was designed by the prominent Des Moines architectural firm of Liebbe, Nourse & Rasmussen. The building served as a hotel until 1972 when it was converted into apartments for low-income people. It retained the first-floor commercial space, which was original to the building. It was individually listed on the National Register of Historic Places in 2008, and as a contributing property in the Fort Dodge Downtown Historic District in 2010.
