= Webster County Courthouse (Iowa) =

- U.S. National Register of Historic Places
- U.S. Historic district – Contributing property
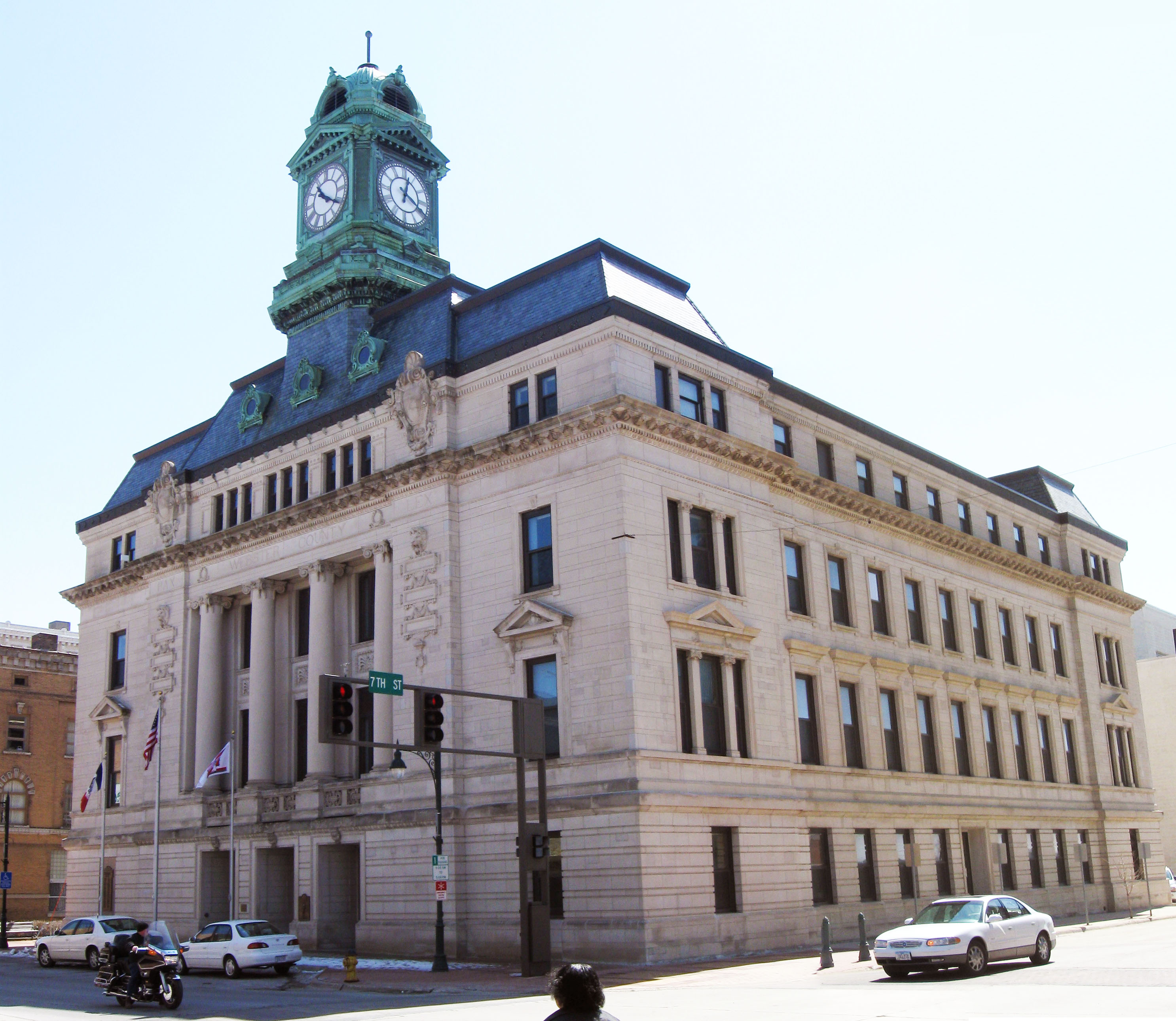

- Location within Iowa Location within the United States
- Location: 701 Central Ave. Fort Dodge, Iowa
- Coordinates: 42°30′17″N 94°11′18.2″W
- Area: less than one acre
- Built: 1902
- Built by: Northern Building Company
- Architect: Henry C. Koch
- Architectural style: Beaux-Arts; Classical Revival
- Part of: Fort Dodge Downtown Historic District (ID10000918)
- MPS: County Courthouses in Iowa TR
- NRHP reference No.: 81000274
- Added to NRHP: July 2, 1981

The Webster County Courthouse is a historic building in Fort Dodge, Iowa, United States. Built in 1902, it primarily houses local government offices for Webster County. The courthouse is the second building the county has used for court functions and county administration. It was individually listed on the National Register of Historic Places in 1981, and as a contributing property in the Fort Dodge Downtown Historic District in 2010.

== History ==
After the county was organized in 1852, the community of Homer was designated the county seat. At the time it was the largest town in the region. Fort Dodge almost immediately sought to have the county seat moved there, and an election to decide the issue was held on April 7, 1856, with Fort Dodge coming out victorious. Construction began in 1859 on an elaborate courthouse, but the cupola could not be built as designed, the specified stone could not be acquired, and the building's plans were constantly being changed. The original contractors abandoned the project after only the first floor was completed, and the timeframe for completion was pushed back two years. A rather plain two-story structure that measured 100 by 50 feet (30 by 15 m) was completed in 1861. Over the years the building was expanded, and a clock tower was added to the structure. Space was allocated for Federal court offices.

On November 7, 1899, voters approved the construction of a new courthouse. A larger plot of land was sought for the new building until it was learned that the property the old courthouse stood on would revert to its previous owner. Accordingly, the old building was destroyed and a new four-story courthouse built on the same site. This stone building represented a significant expansion of its predecessor. The courthouse was not completed until 1902, at which point approximately $100,000 had been expended in constructing the building. It was designed by Milwaukee architect Henry C. Koch, and built by Northern Building Company. By 1980, the courthouse required extensive renovations, including a new roof, exterior repairs, restorations to the clock tower, and a refurbished interior; the entire process took several million dollars and over twenty years to complete.

== Present status ==
Today, the courthouse is the site of much local and regional government business, including the office of the county assessor, the meeting area for the Webster County Board of Health, service offices for the hearing impaired, and offices for the state courts of the Second Judicial District. The significance of the courthouse is derived from its association with county government, and the political power and prestige of Fort Dodge as the county seat.

In 2021, construction was completed on a restoration of the courthouse roof and iconic clock tower.

== Architecture ==
The courthouse is a four-story stone structure. The main facade has four stone Ionic columns that rise from the second to the third floor. Three recessed openings on the first floor serve as the main entrance. Above a mansard roof is a green-colored clock tower. A projecting cornice divides the third and fourth floors. Unlike Iowa's other Beaux Arts courthouses, the long axis of the building is perpendicular to the main facade.

The interior features a rectangular light court that is covered with a white glass barrel-vaulted skylight. A marble staircase with brass balustrade and handrails is located in the light court. The perimeter of the court is set off by column screens with columns in the Corinthian and Ionic orders. The space is decorated with Adamesque details.

== See also ==
- List of Iowa county courthouses
