= First National Bank of Mason City =

- U.S. National Register of Historic Places
- U.S. Historic district – Contributing property
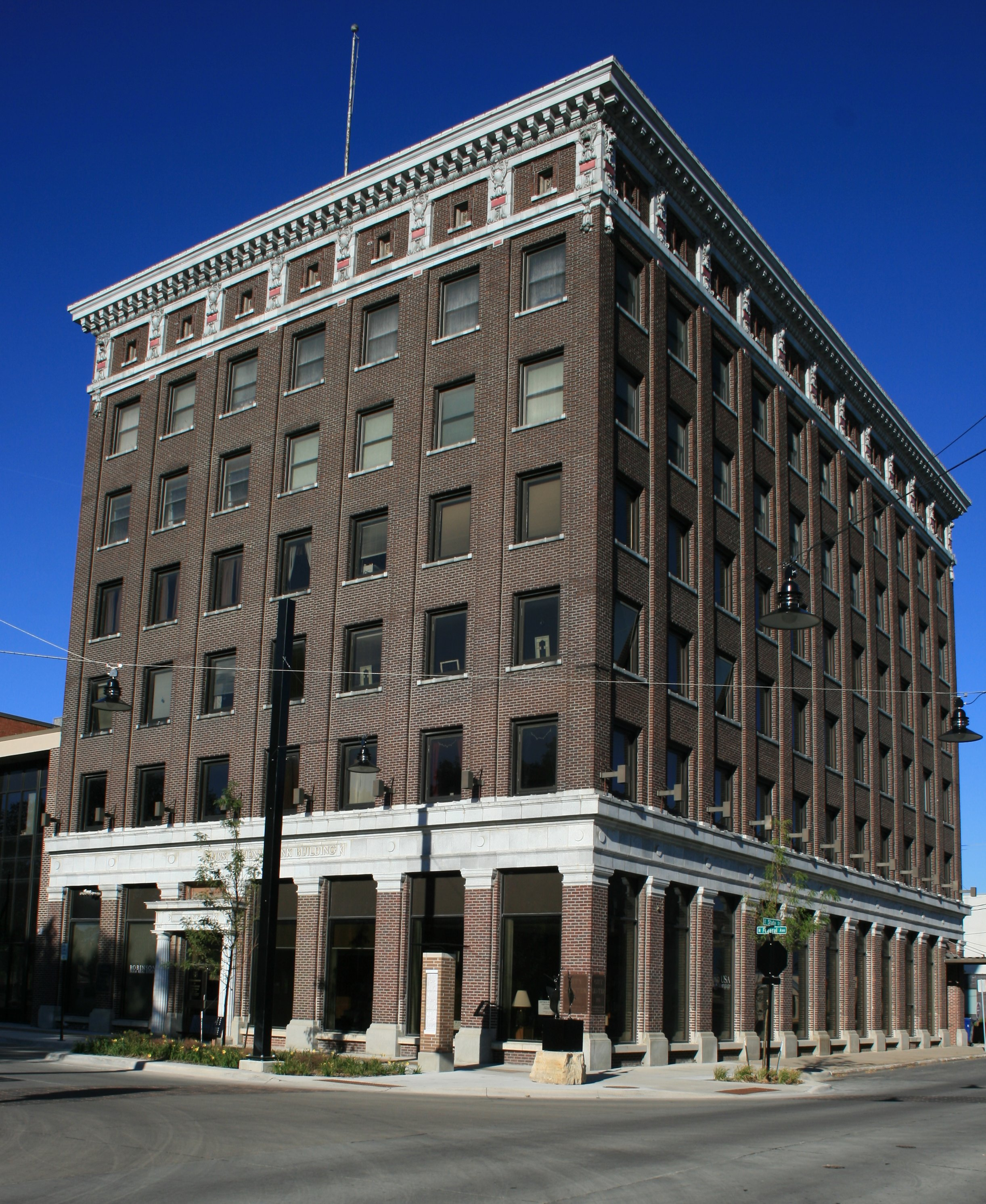

- Location within Iowa Location within the United States
- Location: 5-7 N. Federal Ave. Mason City, Iowa
- Coordinates: 43°09′07.5″N 93°12′02.7″W
- Area: less than one acre
- Built: 1911
- Built by: C.E. Atkinson
- Architect: Liebbe, Nourse & Rasmussen
- Architectural style: Early Commercial
- Part of: Mason City Downtown Historic District (ID05000956)
- NRHP reference No.: 97000392
- Added to NRHP: May 2, 1997

The First National Bank of Mason City, also known as Norwest Bank Building and City Center of Mason City, is a historic building located in Mason City, Iowa, United States. It was designed by the Des Moines architectural firm of Liebbe, Nourse & Rasmussen, and it was the only Mason City commission for this firm. Completed in 1911, it was constructed by C.E. Atkinson of Webster City, Iowa who had built several other H.F. Liebbe designs. The 6½-story building follows the Early Commercial style. It features modestly decorated main floor and attic level with five floors of rather plain brick construction in between. The bank occupied most of the first floor and some of the office space above, while the other office space was taken up by professional offices. By the 1960s the bank occupied the whole building. A building to the north of the bank was torn down in 1982 and a two-story annex to the bank replaced it.

John Dillinger, Baby Face Nelson, John Hamilton and Tommy Carroll robbed the bank on March 13, 1934 and stole about $50,000. Dillinger was wounded in an exchange of gunfire during the heist.

The bank building was individually listed on the National Register of Historic Places in 1997, and as a contributing property in the Mason City Downtown Historic District in 2005. City Center of Mason City Inc. bought the building in 1995, and remodeled it into apartments and offices.
