= First National Bank Building (Fort Dodge, Iowa) =

- U.S. National Register of Historic Places
- U.S. Historic district – Contributing property
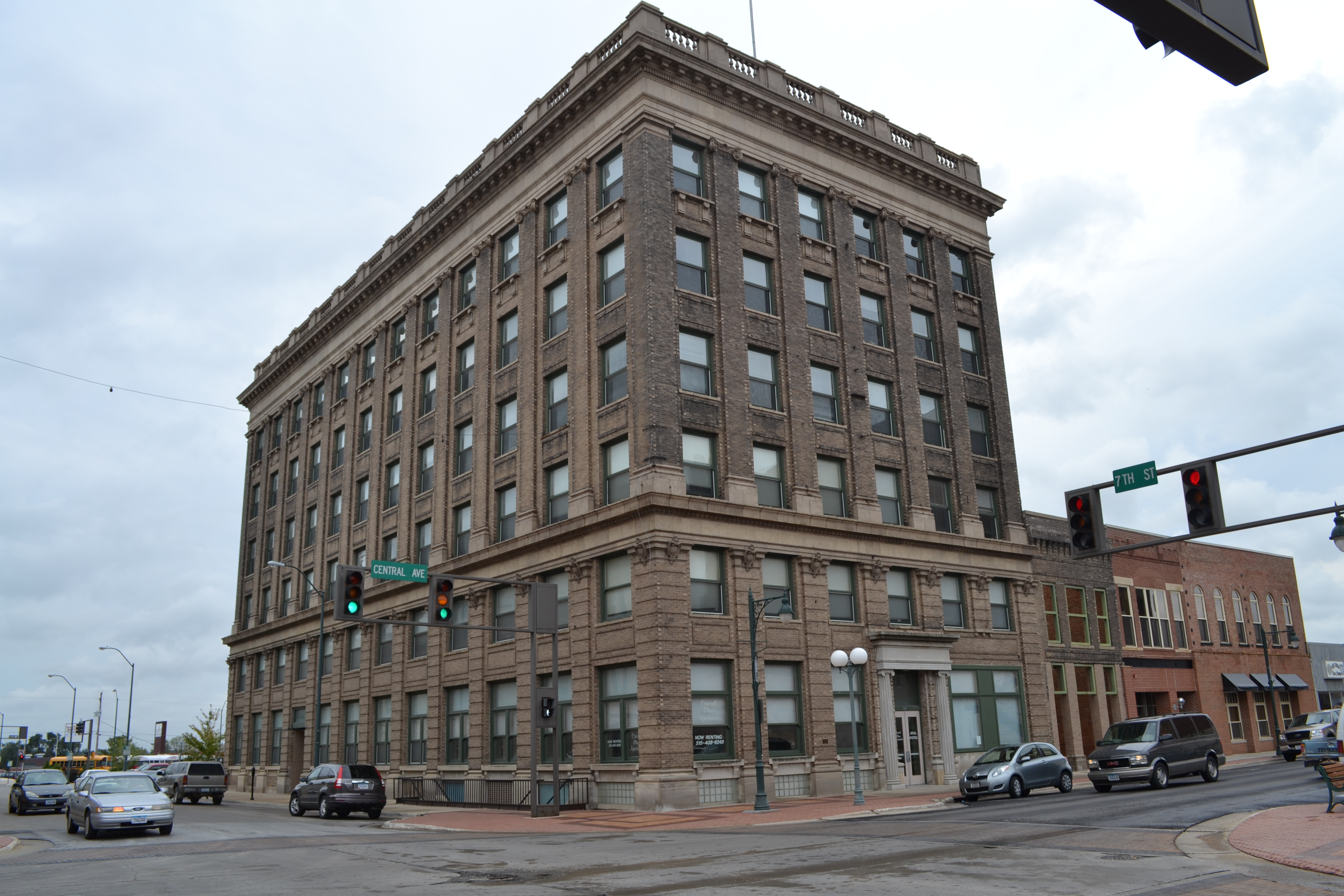

- Location within Iowa Location within the United States
- Location: 629 Central Ave. Fort Dodge, Iowa
- Coordinates: 42°30′17″N 94°11′19″W
- Built: 1908
- Architect: Liebbe, Nourse & Rasmussen
- Architectural style: Early Commercial
- Part of: Fort Dodge Downtown Historic District (ID10000918)
- NRHP reference No.: 03000061
- Added to NRHP: February 27, 2003

The First National Bank Building, now known as the Central Place Apartments, is a historic building located in Fort Dodge, Iowa, United States. The First National Bank was established in 1866 and grew to become the city's principal financial institution. Its officers and directors throughout its existence were among the city's most prominent businessmen. The present building was designed by the Des Moines architectural firm of Liebbe, Nourse & Rasmussen in the Early Commercial style. The six-story structure rises to a height of 90 feet (27 m) The building has subsequently been renovated into apartments. It was individually listed on the National Register of Historic Places in 2003, and as a contributing property in the Fort Dodge Downtown Historic District in 2010.
