= Fort Dodge Junior High School =

- U.S. National Register of Historic Places
- Location within Iowa Location within the United States
- Location: 416 S. 10th St. Fort Dodge, Iowa
- Coordinates: 42°30′02.8″N 94°11′04.3″W
- NRHP reference No.: 15000730
- Added to NRHP: October 13, 2015

Fort Dodge Junior High School, also known as South Junior High, Fair Oaks Middle School and Duncombe Elementary School, is a historic building located in Fort Dodge, Iowa, United States. The building was constructed in 1931 and continued to serve as a school under its various names until 2013. It, along with Phillips Middle School, was sold to Foutch Bros. LLC, of Kansas City, Missouri the following year to be converted into apartments. In 2015 Duncombe Elementary School was found to be structurally deficient, and Foutch allowed the Fair Oaks building to be used as an elementary school while a new school building was constructed. The building was listed on the National Register of Historic Places in 2015.
