= Lorenzo S. Coffin Burial Plot =

Historic site in Webster County, Iowa, US

- U.S. National Register of Historic Places
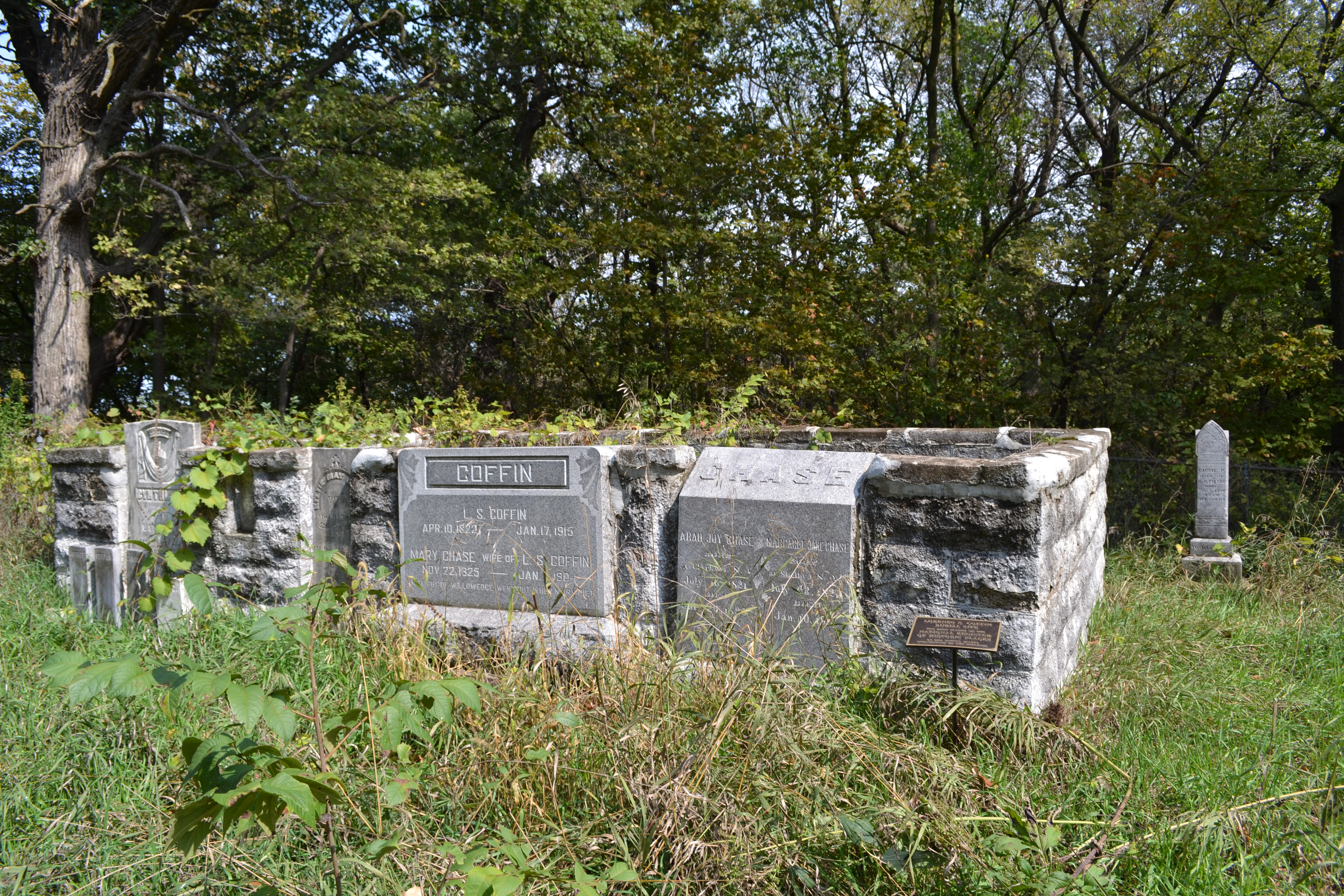

- Location within Iowa Location within the United States
- Location: Northwest of Fort Dodge on Iowa Highway 7
- Coordinates: 42°31′30″N 94°14′21″W
- Area: less than one acre
- NRHP reference No.: 77000566
- Added to NRHP: November 17, 1977

The Lorenzo S. Coffin Burial Plot (also known as Willowedge Cemetery and Coffin Cemetery) is a historic structure located northwest of Fort Dodge, Iowa, United States. Initially, the various members of the Coffin family had individual grave markers, but after Lorenzo Coffin's death, they were incorporated into a concrete wall. The surrounding graves are those of non-family members. The Coffin family home was originally to the west of the grave site. It was listed on the National Register of Historic Places in 1977.
