= Liebbe, Nourse & Rasmussen =

Architectural firm in USA

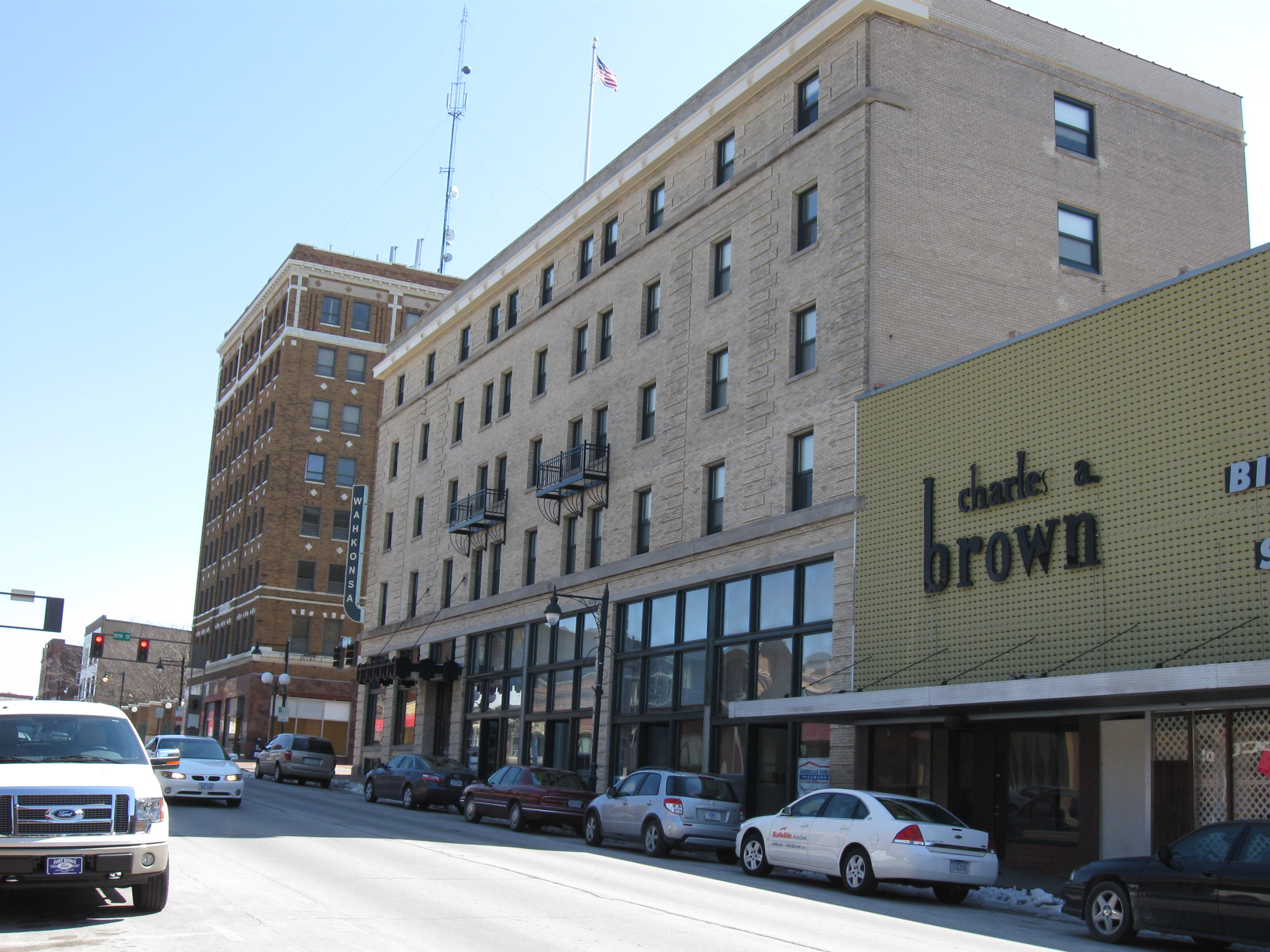
Wahkonsa Hotel

Liebbe, Nourse & Rasmussen was an architectural firm in the U.S. state of Iowa. They designed Kromer Flats built in 1905. It designed courthouses, commercial buildings, and residences. Several are listed on the U.S. National Register of Historic Places.

The firm was established in 1899 as a partnership between Henry Frantz Liebbe (1851 -1927), Clinton C. Nourse, and Edward F. Rasmussen (1867 - 1930). Liebbe was born in Germany. He was in Des Moines by 1873. He married Medora Jones in 1879. He served as state architect from 1904 until his death.

== Work ==
- Wahkonsa Hotel (1910), 927 Central Ave., Fort Dodge, Iowa
- College Corner Commercial Historic Business District, Euclid Ave., between Second and Third Aves. Des Moines, IA, NRHP-listed
- Crawford House (1896), 2203 Grand Ave. Des Moines, IA, NRHP-listed
- Des Moines City Hall (1910) was designed by four architectural firms: Liebbe, Nourse and Rasmussen, Hallett & Rawson, Wetherell & Gage, and Proudfoot & Bird
- Ericson Public Library (1901), 702 Greene St. Boone, IA, NRHP-listed
- First National Bank Building (1908), 629 Central Ave. Fort Dodge, IA, NRHP-listed
- First National Bank of Mason City (1911), 5-7 N. Federal Ave. Mason City, IA, NRHP-listed
- Hampton Public Library (1905), one of the Carnegie libraries of Iowa
- Kromer Flats (1905), 1433—1439 6th Ave. Des Moines, IA, NRHP-listed
- Municipal Building (1916), 420 Kellogg Ave. Ames, IA, NRHP-listed
- The Oaklands Historic District, Oakland and Arlington Aves. between Franklin and College Aves. Des Moines, IA, NRHP-listed
- Perry Carnegie Library Building (1904), 1123 Willis Ave. Perry, IA, NRHP-listed
- Younker Brothers Department Store, 713 Walnut St. Des Moines, IA, NRHP-listed
- One or more buildings in the Hampton Double Square Historic District, Downtown Hampton, Iowa, NRHP-listed
- One or more buildings in the Iowa City Downtown Historic District, NRHP-listed
- One or more buildings in the Washington and Elizabeth Miller Tract-Center-Soll Community Historic District, NRHP-listed
