= Fort Dodge Senior High School (1922) =

- U.S. National Register of Historic Places
- Location within Iowa Location within the United States
- Location: 1015 5th Ave., N. Fort Dodge, Iowa
- Coordinates: 42°30′35.6″N 94°11′07.8″W
- Built: 1992
- NRHP reference No.: 15000731
- Added to NRHP: October 13, 2015

The former Fort Dodge Senior High School building, also known as South Junior High and Phillips Middle School, is a historic building located in Fort Dodge, Iowa, United States. The building was constructed in 1922 with additions completed in 1948 and 1979. When the current high school was built in 1958, this building became known as North Junior High School, housing grades 7, 8, and 9. The Fort Dodge Community School District's adoption of the middle school philosophy in 1984 changed the name of the building to Phillips Middle School. District-wide grade reconfiguration in 1990 changed Phillips to a building housing grades 7 and 8. It, along with Fair Oaks Middle School, was sold to Foutch Brothers. LLC, of Kansas City, Missouri the following year to be converted into apartments. The building was listed on the National Register of Historic Places in 2015.
