= Des Moines City Hall =

Government building in Iowa, U.S.

- Municipal Building
- U.S. National Register of Historic Places
- U.S. Historic district – Contributing property
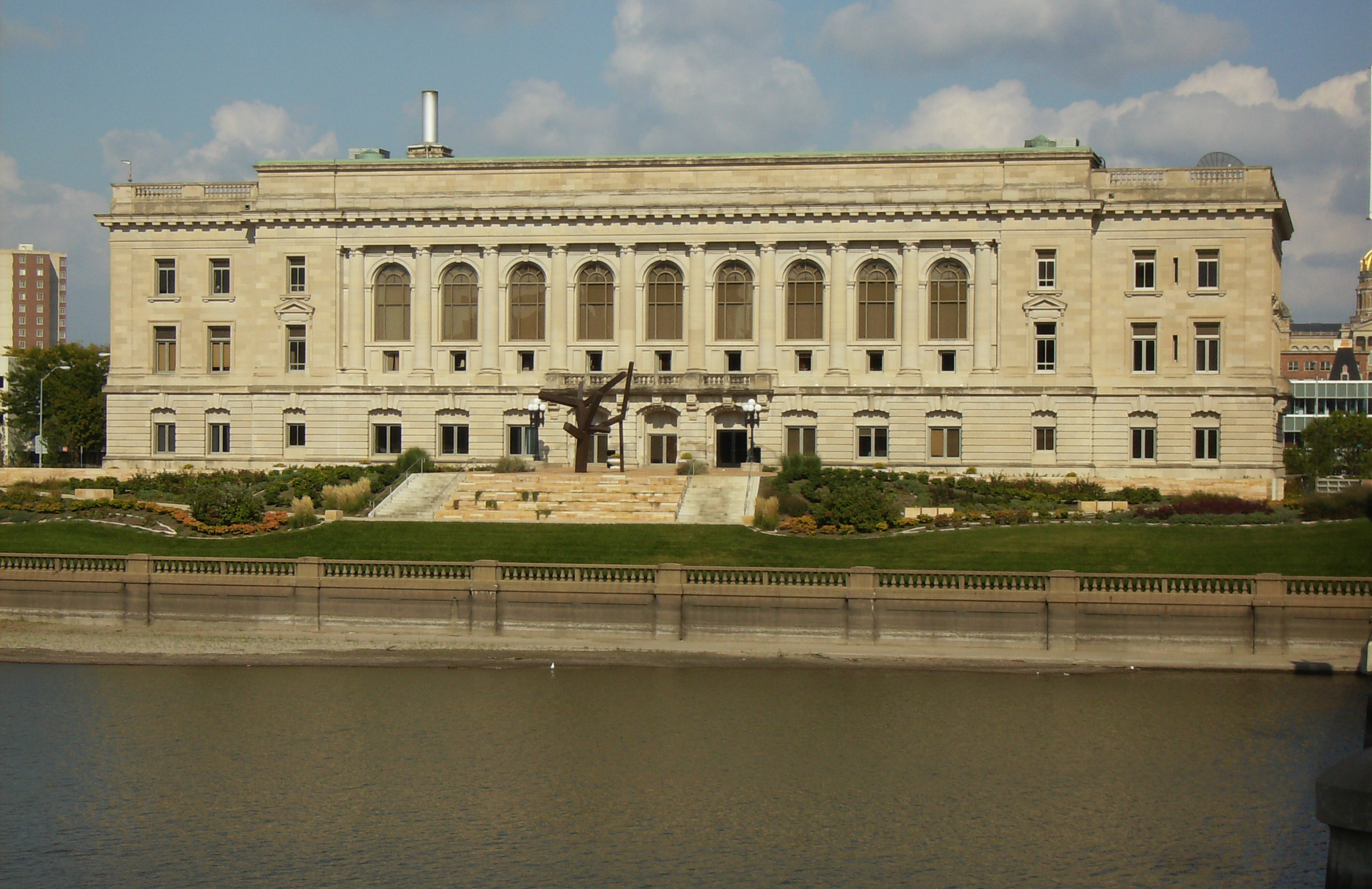

- Location within Iowa Location within the United States
- Location: E. 1st & Locust Sts. Des Moines, Iowa
- Coordinates: 41°35′20.7″N 93°36′59.6″W
- Built: 1910
- Architectural style: Beaux Arts
- Part of: Civic Center Historic District (ID79000926)
- NRHP reference No.: 77000549
- Added to NRHP: November 10, 1977

The Des Moines City Hall is a government building in Des Moines, Iowa, built in 1909 and 1910. It was individually listed on the National Register of Historic Places on November 10, 1977 as the Municipal Building, and became a contributing property in the Civic Center Historic District in 1988. The building served as the seat for the government of the city of Des Moines for 114 years and 29 days. In January 2026, this building was vacated and officially designated as the Des Moines Historic City Hall. The City of Des Moines is retaining ownership of the building. This City Hall location served as the administrative center for the City of Des Moines from January 1, 1912, to January 29, 2026. The City of Des Moines, Iowa’s capital city and the county seat of Polk County, continues to serve more than 214,000 residents across 46 neighborhoods. While this building is now closed, city services remain fully operational at the City’s new City Hall location, inside TM Franklin Cownie City Administration Building at 1200 Locust Street. Beginning April 7, 2016, City Hall offices were temporarily relocated while the building underwent renovation. The construction was necessary to install modern heating, cooling, and sprinkler systems while preserving the historic character of the building. The project was expected to take 18–24 months. During that time, City Hall was closed to the public, and City offices moved to other nearby locations. Between February 26, 2018 and April 9, 2018, city offices moved back to City Hall.

== History ==
From 1851 to 1870, the city council met in churches, schools, homes and stores. In that time period, the population of the city grew from 1,500 to more than 12,000. The city council approved the construction of a two-room log building in 1869 to serve the needs of the fire department and city business. It was built the following year at the corner of Second and Walnut Streets.

In ten years the city's population grew by another 10,000 people. In 1880, the city council decided to build a new city hall and a separate building for the police and fire departments next door. It was built in 1882 on the corner of Locust Street and Second Avenue. The city failed to maintain the building adequately, and it was too small to serve its needs, a new building was needed.

Des Moines had also grown in size. Its population was 86,000 in 1910 and it covered 65 square miles. In 1907, the city council decided to construct a new city hall. A location was chosen on the east side of the Des Moines River between Grand Avenue and Locust Street. A new bridge on Locust Street was planned to open in 1909. Streets in the area had also been raised 3–4 feet to lessen the impact of flooding.

The Des Moines architectural firm Proudfoot & Bird was hired to design the new structure. Because of recent corruption in city politics, they were tasked to design a building that would define an open and honest government. It was also to be large enough to house all city departments except the fire department. The building should also allow citizens to see and hear city business being transacted. To help create a new image, the building's name was to be called the Municipal Building rather than city hall.

Legal challenges to a bond referendum were made in 1907 and 1908. A referendum was passed by voters in April 1908. But because women were forbidden to vote Mary J. Coggeshall sued the city for the right of women to vote based on an 1894 state law that allowed women to vote on issues, but not candidates. Grace Ballentyne, the state's first female lawyer, argued the case before the Iowa Supreme Court. They won and a new referendum was held in November 1908, and it once again passed.

A division occurred in the city council when new members wanted a say as to who the architect would be. In July 1909 the mayor offered a compromise that allowed each member of the council to select an architectural firm to work on the project. The firms were known as the “Associated Architects,” and included: Liebbe, Nourse and Rasmussen, Hallett & Rawson, Wetherell & Gage, and Proudfoot & Bird.

The cornerstone for the new building was laid on June 14, 1910. Charles Weitz’ Sons Construction Company of Des Moines built the building. It was opened to the public on January 1, 1912. Over the years, only a few changes were made to the physical structure, which continues to serve the city government.

== Architecture ==
Des Moines City Hall is a three-story Beaux Arts style building. It is 77 feet wide by 231 feet long. Most of the plans that were drawn up by Proudfoot & Bird were used by the Associated Architects in the final plans. It is a brick structure built on a concrete foundation. The exterior is clad in Bedford stone, which was chosen to match the Old Downtown Des Moines Library and the post office on the west bank of the river. The floors in the vestibules, entrances, public halls and council chambers are covered in marble. Polished Tennessee marble was used for the wainscoting in the public halls, entrances and the Main Hall. Interior woodwork is composed of white oak.

== See also ==
The following are other buildings in the East Village that are listed on the National Register of Historic Places:

- Baker-Devotie-Hollingsworth Block
- Hohberger Building
- Northwestern Hotel
- Syndicate Block
- Teachout Building
