= North Western Hotel =

North Western Hotel, or variations on the name, applies to a number of hotels:

- Northwestern Hotel (Des Moines, Iowa)
- North Western Hotel, Liverpool
- North-Western Hotel, Livingstone
- North Western Hotel, Morecambe
