= Northwestern Hotel =

Northwestern Hotel may refer to:

- Northwestern Hotel (Des Moines, Iowa), listed on the National Register of Historic Places in Polk County, Iowa
- Northwestern Hotel (Waukesha, Wisconsin), listed on the National Register of Historic Places in Waukesha County, Wisconsin
- North Western Hotel, Liverpool, a grade II listed building in Liverpool, England.
- North Western Hotel, Morecambe, in Morecambe, England.
- North-Western Hotel, Livingstone, in Livingstone, Zambia
