= George Floyd protests in Iowa =

Protests in Iowa caused by the murder of George Floyd

- Part of George Floyd protests
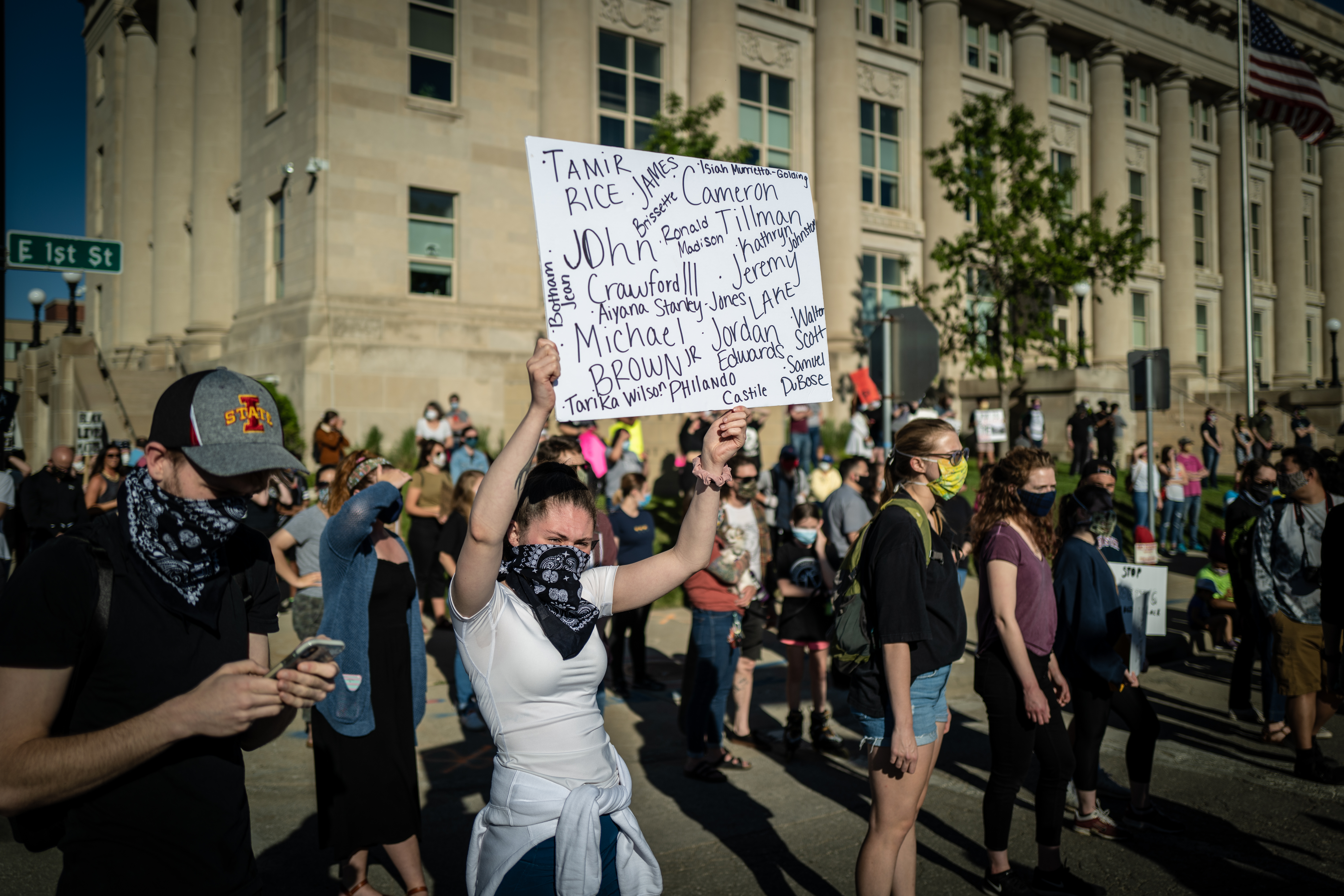
- Protest in Des Moines on May 29
- Date: May 28 – June 5, 2020 (1 week and 1 day)
- Location: Iowa, United States
- Caused by: Police brutality; Institutional racism against African Americans; Reaction to the murder of George Floyd; Economic, racial and social inequality

This is a list of George Floyd protests in Iowa, United States.

== Locations ==
=== Ames ===
Roughly 300 people gathered the evening of May 30 to march around Ames' City Hall.

=== Cedar Rapids ===
Protesters gathered at the Linn County Courthouse on May 29, 2020.

=== Council Bluffs ===
A small group protested in Bayliss Park on May 31.

=== Davenport ===
May 30: More than 500 people in LaClaire Park to protest. Rocks were thrown during part of the protest. May 31: Dozens of shots were fired all over the city. At midnight, a 22-year-old female protester was shot in the back and died. A police officer injured in a drive-by shooting was recovering and in "good spirits." On June 1, at around 3:00 a.m., three Davenport police officers were ambushed by gunfire while on patrol. Two of the officers were injured while the third returned fire.

=== Decorah ===
About 200 people gathered on Water Street on the afternoon of May 31 to protest.

=== Des Moines ===
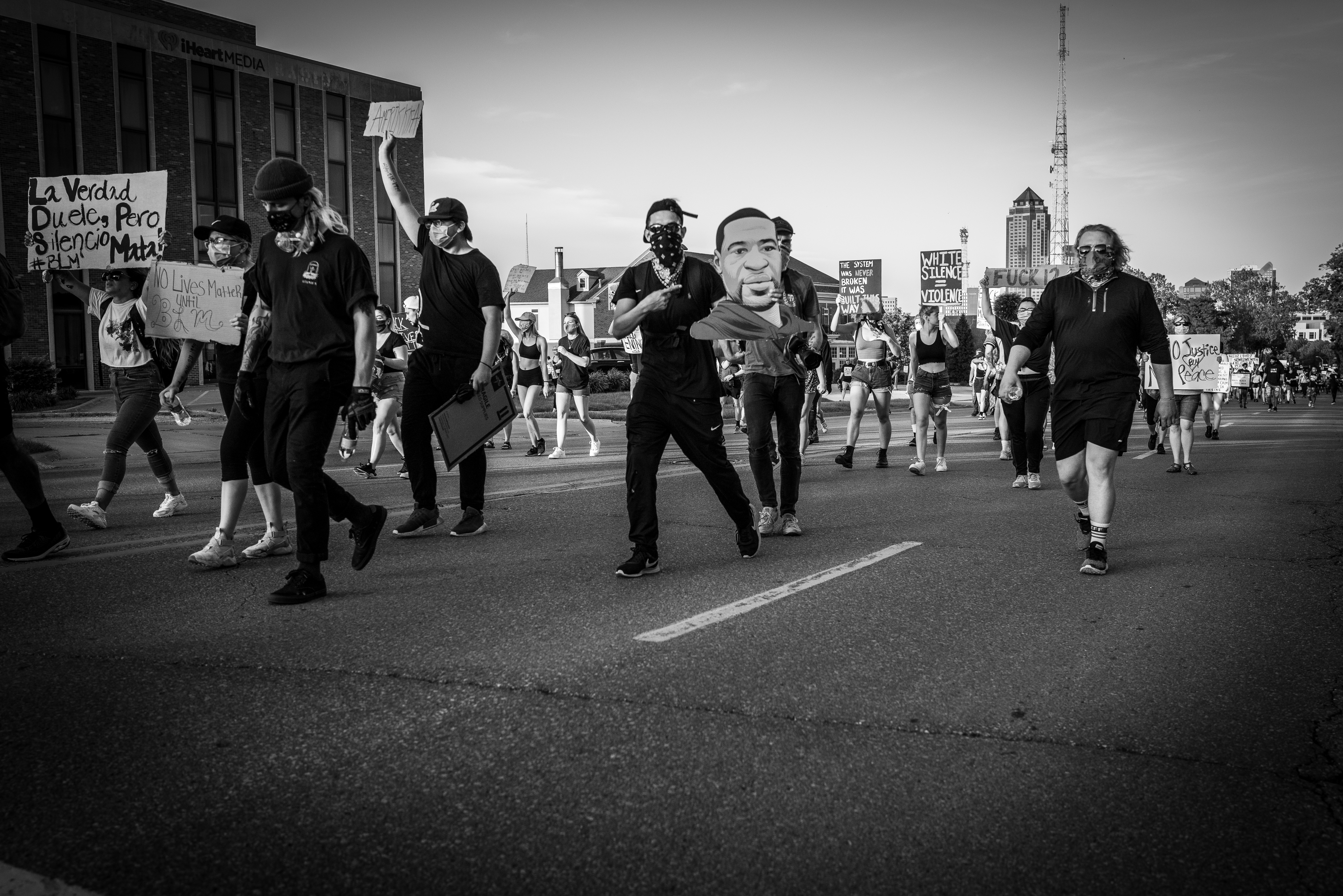
Protest in Des Moines on June 2

Hundreds of protesters clashed with police outside of the city's police headquarters on May 29. Some protesters threw bottles, rocks, bricks, and fire crackers at officers and windows were smashed at nearby buildings in the city's East Village neighborhood. Tear gas and pepper spray were used. A protest and march on May 30 spilled to Iowa State Capitol steps and the city's Court Avenue entertainment district, where windows were broken at the Polk County Courthouse and several businesses were vandalized.

=== Dubuque ===
About 100 protesters lay on the ground to honor George Floyd in Jackson Park on June 1. Speakers included the President of the Dubuque chapter of the NAACP and a woman who sued the city for injuring her with a Taser in 2019.

=== Fort Dodge ===
Around a hundred people gathered in downtown Fort Dodge on May 31 for a protest and March.

=== Iowa City ===
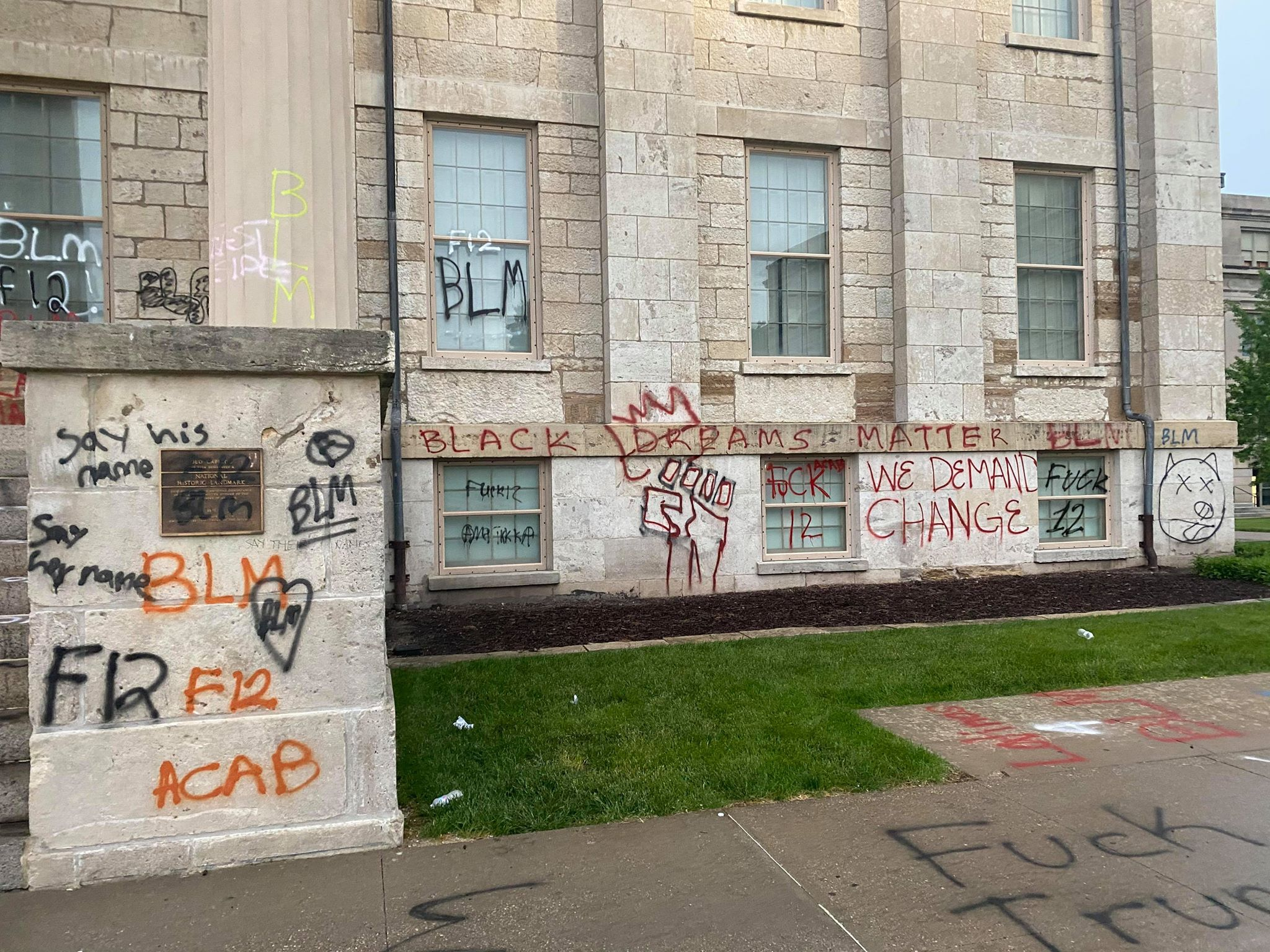
Graffiti on the Old Capitol building in Iowa City on June 5

Hundreds protested the afternoon of May 30 at the Pentacrest on the University of Iowa campus. Streets were blocked to allow protesters to maintain social distance due to the COVID-19 pandemic.

=== Mason City ===
On May 31, about 30 people held signs along North Washington Street near Central Park around 9:30 p.m.

=== Ottumwa ===
On June 5, over 100 protesters rallied in Central Park and marched through downtown.

=== Sioux City ===
On May 29, about 100 protesters marched to the Sioux City Police/Fire Headquarters building. June 5: Hundreds gathered at 3pm for a protest at Cook Park.

=== Waterloo ===
Approximately 500 people marched from Veteran's Memorial Park to Lincoln Park on May 29.
