= Teachout =

Teachout is a surname. Notable people with the surname include:

- Bud Teachout (1904–1985), pitcher in Major League Baseball
- Kristina Teachout (born 2005), American taekwondo athlete
- Terry Teachout (1956–2022), American critic, biographer, librettist, author, playwright, and blogger
- Zephyr Teachout (born 1971), American academic and political activist

== See also ==
- Teachout Building, Des Moines, Iowa, United States
- Teach-out, an arrangement for allowing students to complete their course of study when a school closes down
