= Charles Atherton Cumming =

American artist and educator

- Born: March 31, 1858; Rochester, Illinois
- Died: February 16, 1932 (aged 73); Des Moines, Iowa
- Education: Cornell College; School of the Art Institute of Chicago
- Known for: Artist, Educator, Author

Charles Atherton Cumming (1858–1932) was an American painter, muralist, educator, and arts administrator whose career played a pioneering role in the development of art education and cultural institutions in Iowa. Trained in Chicago and Paris in the academic tradition, he became one of the leading figures in Iowa's artistic community during the late nineteenth and early twentieth centuries. He founded the Cumming School of Art in Des Moines and later became the founding head of the art department at the University of Iowa.

== Early life ==
Cumming was born in Rochester, Illinois, to George Paxton Cumming and Eliza Ellen Atherton Cumming. His father, a farmer and schoolteacher, died during the American Civil War, leaving the family in modest circumstances. From childhood, Cumming demonstrated a strong aptitude for drawing and reportedly won a prize for his artistic work at a county fair exhibition.

Raised partly in the Spoon River region of Illinois, he developed an early appreciation for rural landscapes and natural scenery that later informed much of his artistic work. After attending local schools, he briefly studied at Reading College Academy before enrolling at Cornell College in Mount Vernon, Iowa. Because Cornell offered little formal artistic training at the time, he was encouraged to continue his studies at the Chicago Academy of Design, later the School of the Art Institute of Chicago.

== Artistic training and European study ==
During the late 1870s and early 1880s, Cumming studied at the National Academy of Design, Art Institute of Chicago under Lawrence Carmichael Earle before travelling to Paris to continue his education at the prestigious Académie Julian. There he studied under leading academic painters including Gustave Boulanger, and Jules Lefebvre. He returned to Paris in 1889 and studied with Henri Lucien Doucet and Jean-Joseph Benjamin-Constant. During these European sojourns, he experienced a classical, academic training, and his encounters with European culture greatly influenced his artistry for the remainder of his life. His years in France exposed him to European academic traditions, classical draftsmanship, and contemporary French painting. Although he remained fundamentally committed to realism and academic composition throughout his career, elements of Impressionist colour and atmosphere later appeared in his landscapes and portraits.

== Career ==
Cumming was an important figure and deeply entrenched in the Iowa art scene of the first half of the 20th century.

In 1895 he founded the Cumming School of Art in Des Moines, Iowa, serving as director until 1927. The art school continued as an educational institution until 1954. His works can be found in numerous public and private collections.

Cumming became affiliated with the University of Iowa, where he served as the founding head of the Department of Graphic and Plastic Arts. Under his leadership, the university expanded its visual arts curriculum and helped establish Iowa as a regional center for arts education.

Cumming launched the art department at Cornell College and, in 1909, had become the founding head of the art department at the University of Iowa (Iowa City), a position he continued to hold while also teaching in Des Moines. Some of his teaching manuscripts form part of the Eve Drewelowe collection.

In addition to teaching, Cumming maintained an active painting practice. He produced portraits, landscapes, and murals, often depicting Midwestern subjects and scenes from Iowa history. His public commissions reflected the growing popularity of civic mural programs in the United States during the early twentieth century. He exhibited widely and was a popular portraitist. He painted portraits of influential Iowan's such as Phineas M. Casady, Robert Spencer Finkbine William Larrabee, Thomas Huston Macbride and S. H. M. Byers. He painted a posthumous portrait of Black Hawk (Sauk leader).

Cumming was part of the Capitol Improvements Committee which brought art into government buildings and created public murals, of which he created his own in 1912 for the Polk County Courthouse titled "Departure of the Indians from Fort Des Moines".

Iowa State University incorrectly refers to him as “Cummings” rather than “Cumming.”

== Artistic style ==
Cumming’s work combined elements of French academic painting with aspects of American Impressionism. His portraits emphasized careful draftsmanship and formal composition, while his landscapes often featured looser brushwork and attention to atmospheric light.

Although influenced by European artistic developments, Cumming remained stylistically conservative compared to later modernist painters. His work reflected the transition period between nineteenth-century academic traditions and twentieth-century regional art movements in the American Midwest.

== Mural work and public art ==
Cumming played a significant role in shaping Iowa’s public art landscape both as a practicing muralist and as an institutional gatekeeper for state-commissioned works.

=== Iowa Capitol Commission ===
From 1900, Cumming was named to the Capitol Improvements Commission, which was renamed the Iowa Capitol Commission in 1902. At a time when the public spaces of the Iowa State Capitol were being decorated, Cumming — as a sitting member of the Commission — had direct influence over the selection of artists commissioned to produce murals and other artworks for state government buildings. He served in this capacity until 1906, a period during which the Capitol’s interior art program took much of its present form.

=== Polk County Courthouse mural ===
Cumming’s most documented mural is Departure of the Indians from Fort Des Moines (1912–1914), painted for the Polk County Courthouse in Des Moines. He was commissioned in 1912 as one of four artists each tasked with depicting an episode from the region’s early history. His chosen subject — the removal of the Indigenous Sauk and other peoples from the Fort Des Moines area in the 1840s — reflects both his Regionalist commitment to Iowa’s historical record and the period’s prevailing interest in frontier narratives. The mural was completed and publicly noted by March 1914.

=== Murals within his broader practice ===
Cumming’s mural work was continuous with his wider Regionalist output rather than a separate endeavor. His paintings consistently focused on Iowa scenes, Iowa people, and Iowa history across all formats — easel portraits, landscapes, and large-scale public works alike. His European training under academic painters at the Académie Julian, including Gustave Boulanger and Jules Lefebvre, gave him the technical foundation for large-format figurative composition that public mural work demands.

== Major works ==
Among Cumming's best-known works is the mural Departure of the Indians from Fort Des Moines. This work reflects early twentieth-century interest in regional history and civic identity.

His surviving works also include:

- Portrait commissions of Iowa civic leaders
- Midwestern landscape paintings
- Educational and civic murals
- Academic figure studies

Several of his works are held in Iowa museum and university collections.

== Teaching and influence ==
Cumming played a major role in the institutional development of art education in Iowa. Through both the Cumming School of Art and the University of Iowa, he helped train a generation of Midwestern artists and promoted the idea that professional arts instruction should be integrated into higher education.

Art historians have identified Cumming as an important transitional figure in Iowa's cultural history because of his efforts to connect European academic traditions with emerging regional artistic identity in the Midwest.

== Writings ==
He authored several works including "Classification of the Arts of Expression"; "The White Man's Art Defined," "The Psychology of the Symbolic Pictorial Arts"; "My Creed" and "Drawing a Neglected Factor in Education".

Cumming's motto was, "Live and serve, here and now while reaching with one hand toward the ideals of the cultured past and with the other hand toward the hopes of the future."

== Gallery ==
The following is a selection of works by Cumming spanning his career as a portraitist, landscape painter, and muralist.

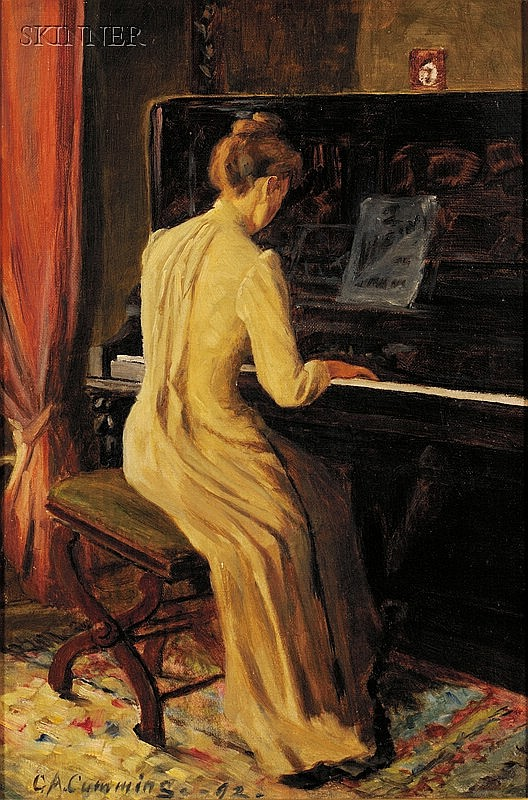
At the piano (1892)

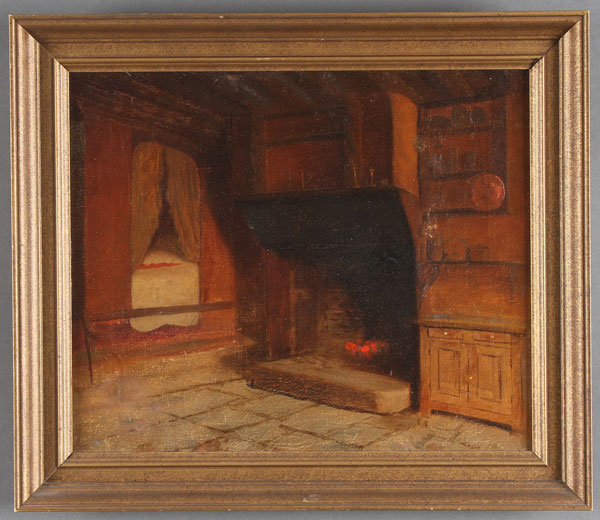
Brittany Kitchen in Hotel Grand Maison (date unknown)

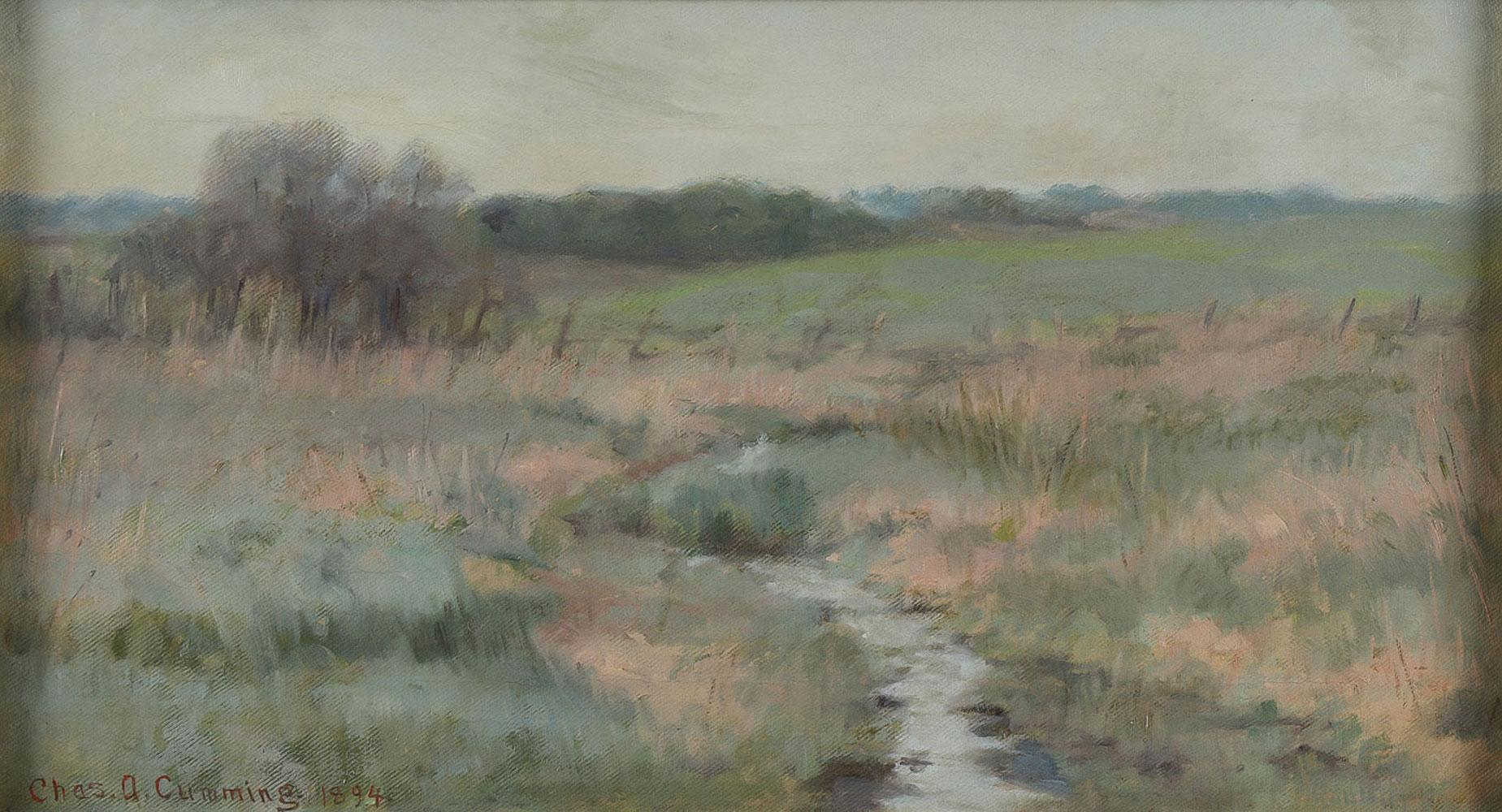
Misty Morning Spring Landscape (1894)

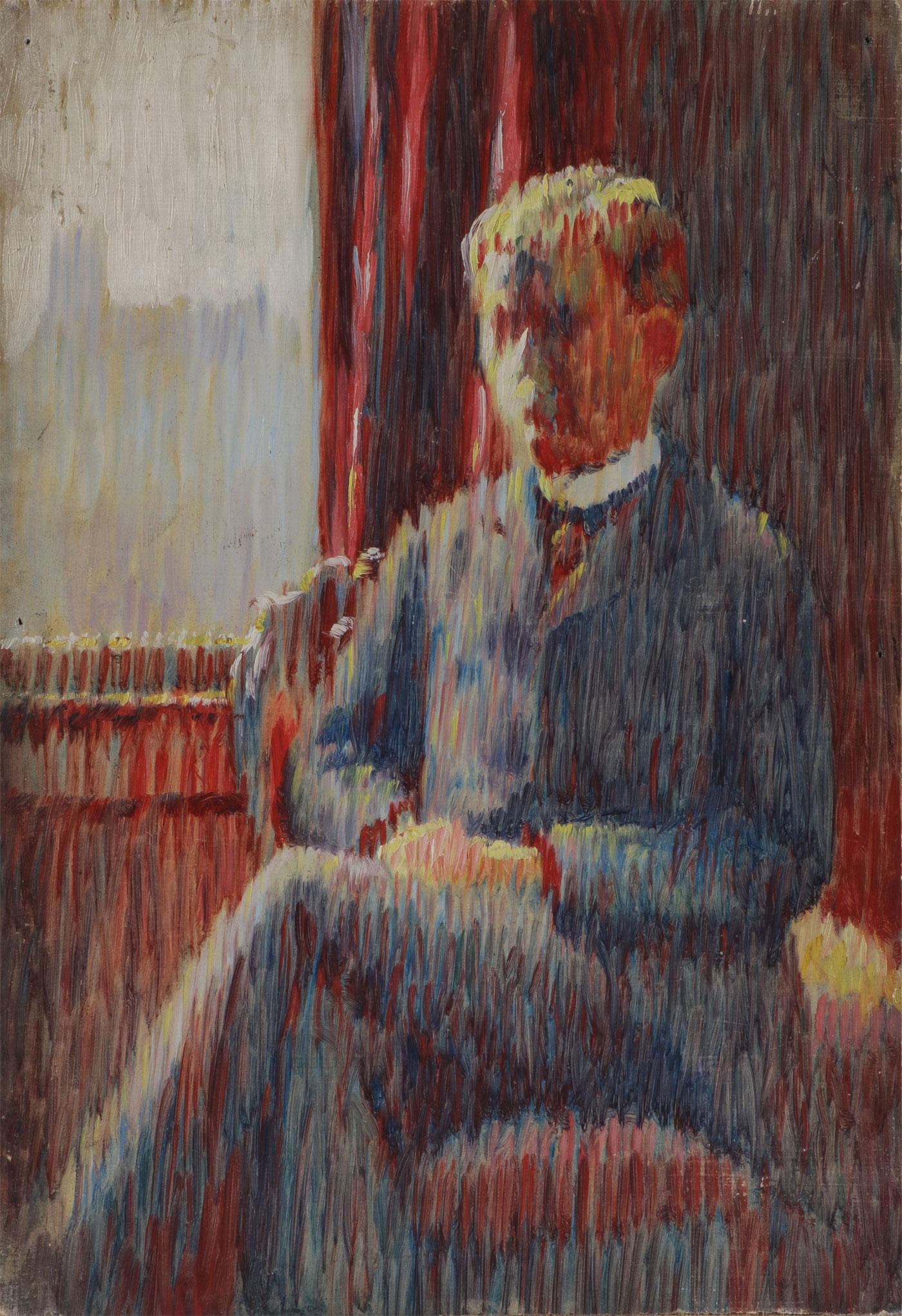
Impressionistic Portrait of Seated Man & verso

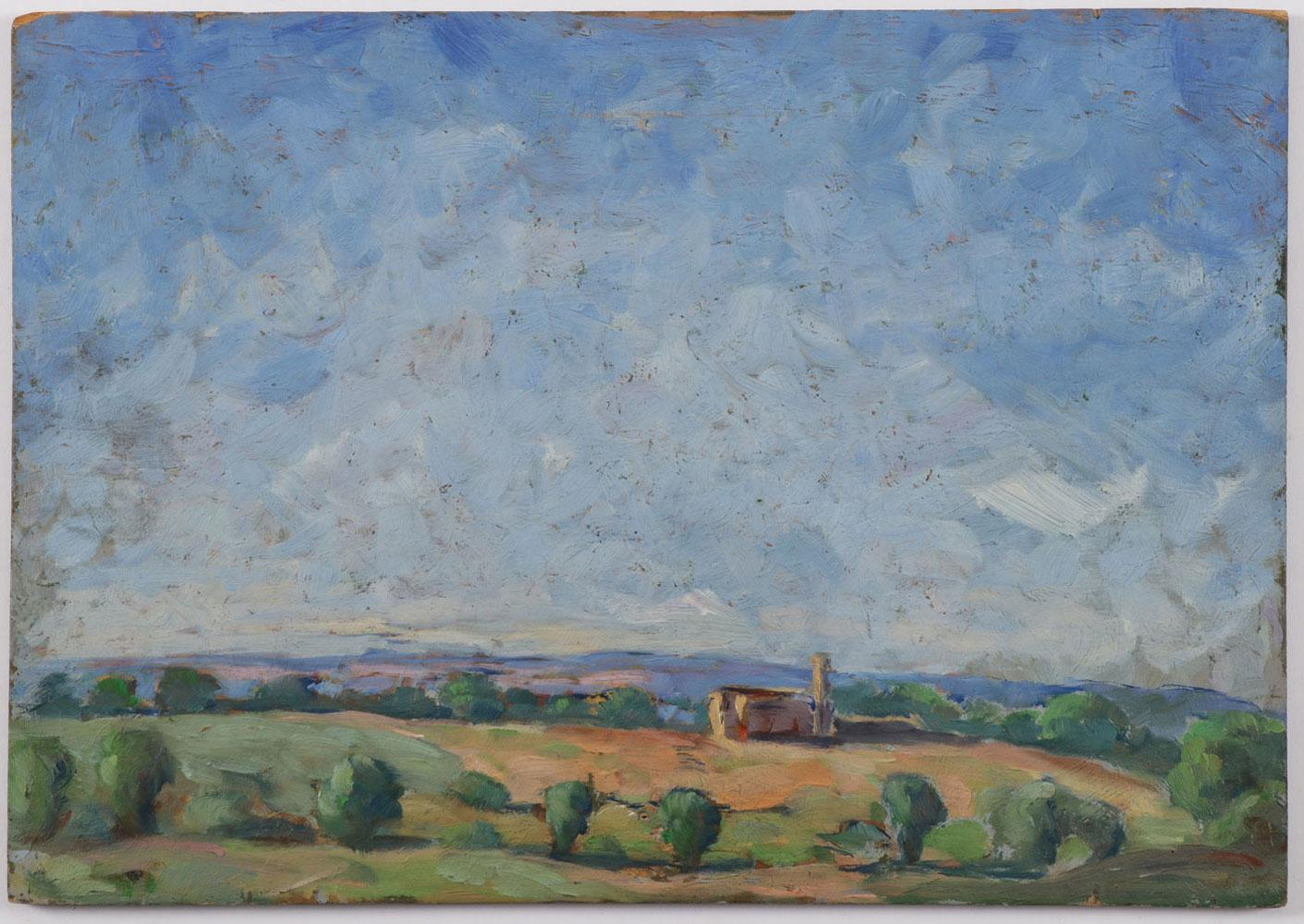
Mid-summer landscape (presumably Iowa)

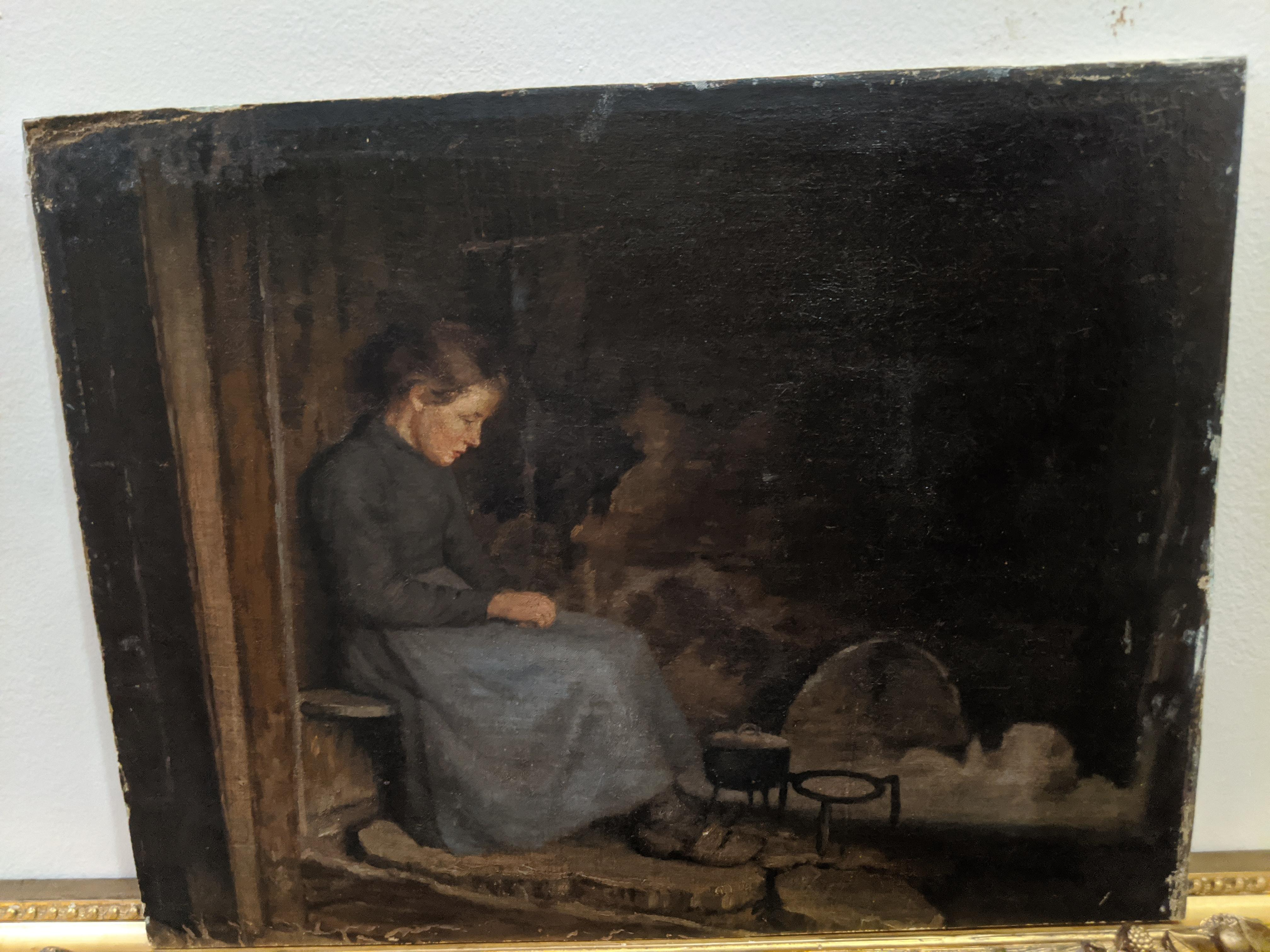
Brittany Girl

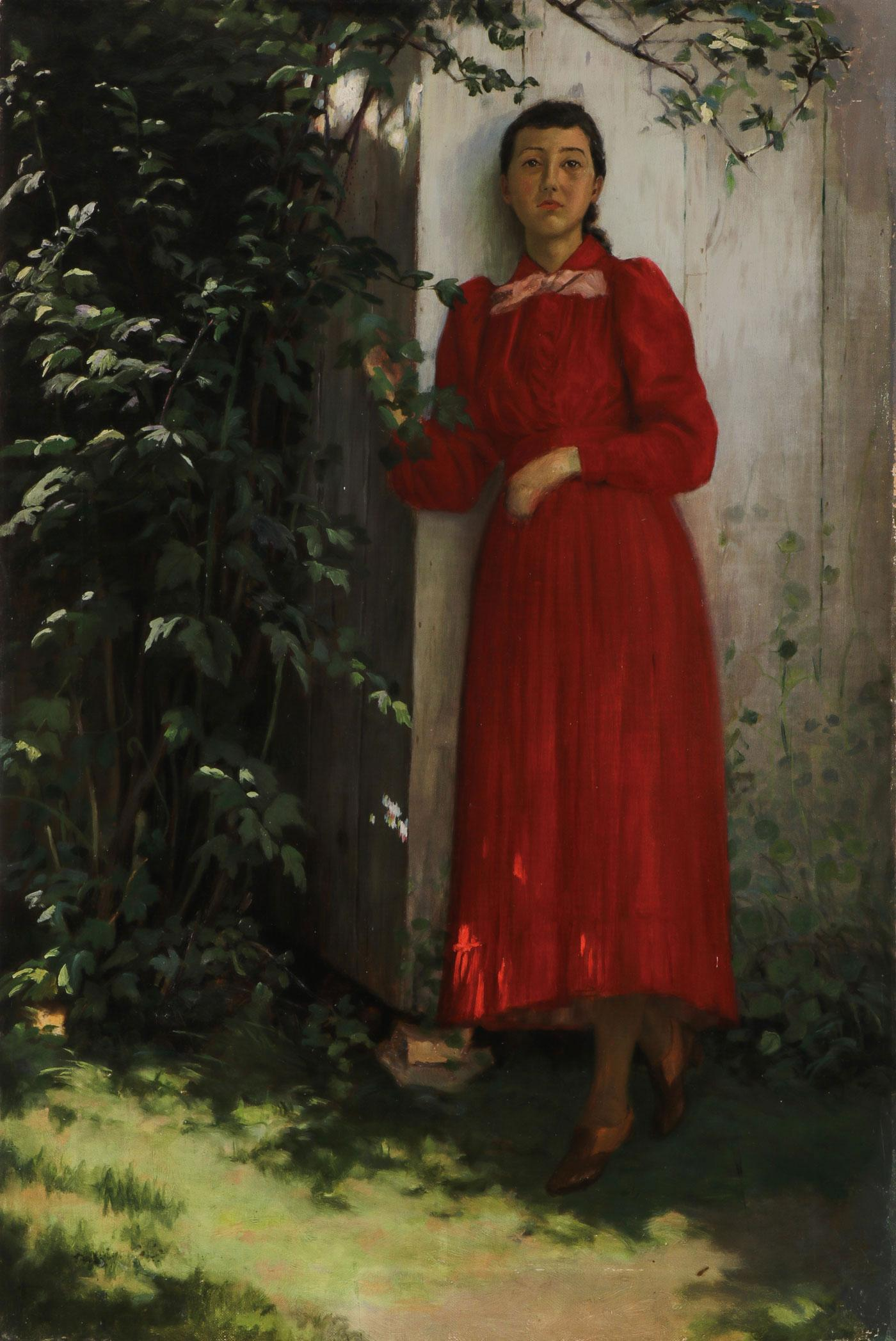
Girl in Red Dress - (circa 1890)

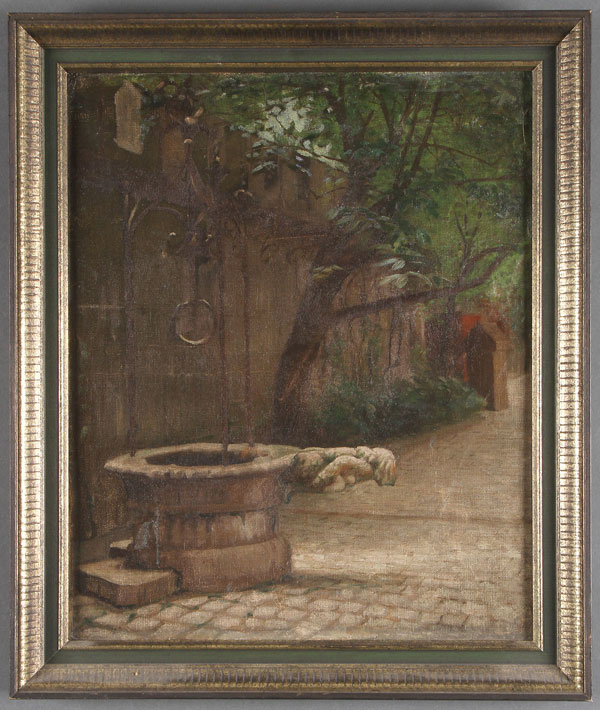

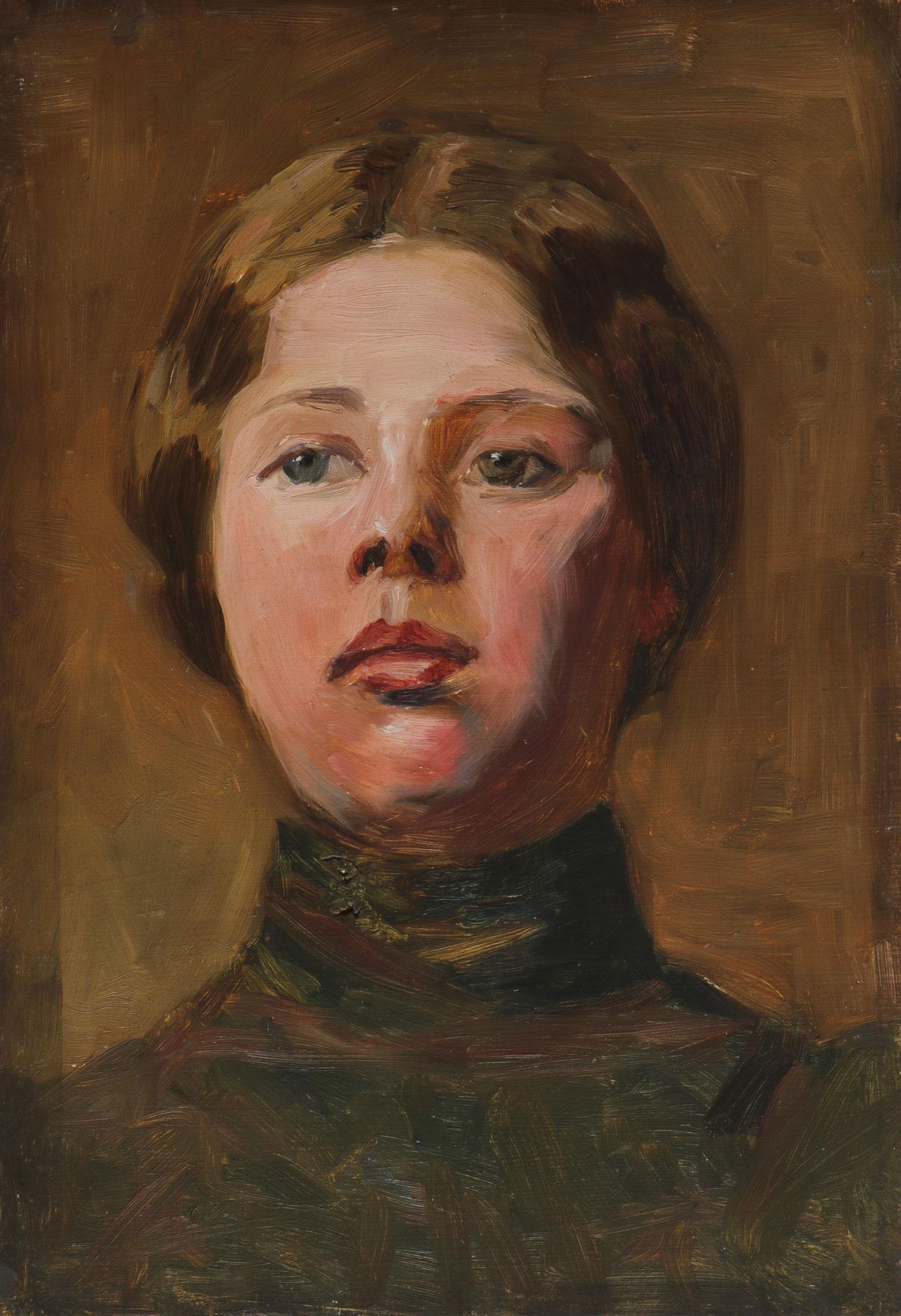

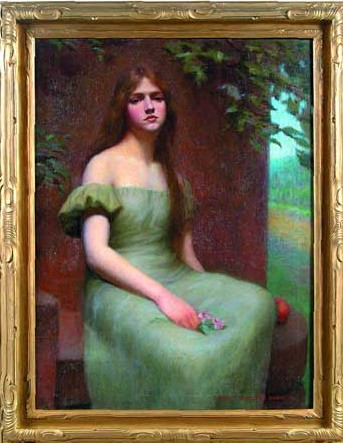
Neva (date unknown)

== Exhibitions ==
- Charles Atherton Cumming: A Deep Root for Iowa Art - State Historical Building, March 1997

== Legacy ==
Although less widely known nationally than some contemporaries, Cumming is regarded as a foundational figure in Iowa art history. His contributions to arts education helped establish lasting institutional support for visual arts programs within the state.

His paintings and archival materials remain part of museum, university, and historical society collections in Iowa. Scholars of Midwestern American art continue to study his role in shaping regional artistic culture during the early twentieth century.A number of his paintings are exhibited at the MacNider Art Museum.

Velma Wallace Rayness collaborated on Charles Atherton Cumming: Iowa's Pioneer Artist-Educator in 1972, which was published by the Iowa Art Guild.

== Personal ==
Cumming married an acclaimed artist, Alice McKee in 1926. Between 1927 and 1932 he maintained a studio at 521 Palm St, San Diego, California. He died in 1932 and is buried in Glendale Cemetery, Des Moines, Iowa.

== Ancestry ==
Cumming’s personal papers indicate that he was also interested in his own genealogy. On his maternal side he was the grandson of Milton Samuel Atherton (1813–1893), of Nevada, Missouri. He is an ancestor of Aaron Atherton (1742–1831).
