= East Des Moines Industrial Historic District =

- East Des Moines Industrial; Historic District
- U.S. National Register of Historic Places
- U.S. Historic district
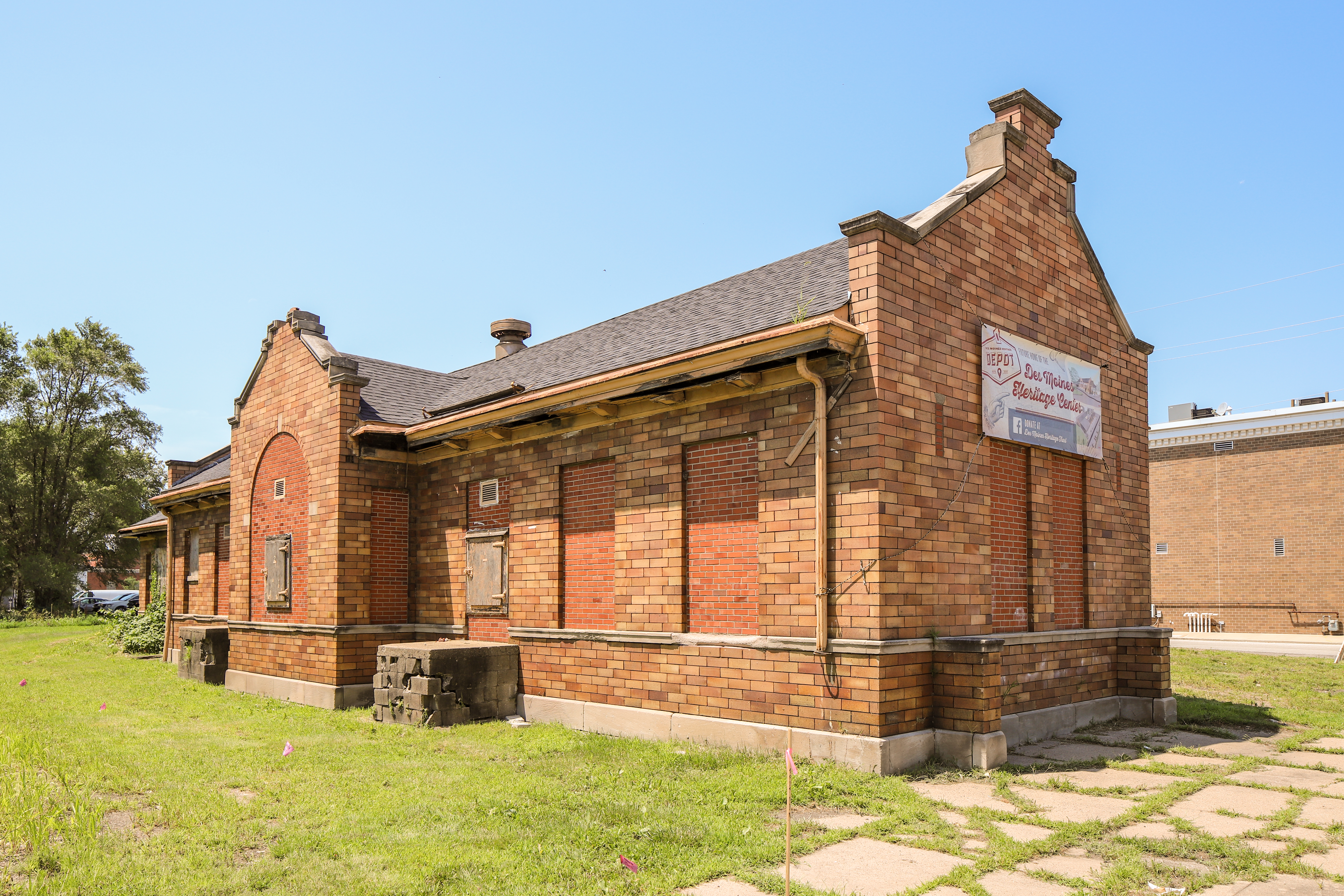
- East Des Moines Union Depot (1909)

- Location within Iowa Location within the United States
- Location: Roughly E. 2nd to E. 5th & E. Walnut to E. Market Sts., 401 East Court Ave. Des Moines, Iowa
- Coordinates: 41°35′07.5″N 93°36′42.5″W
- Area: approximately 32 acres (13 ha)
- NRHP reference No.: 100001700 (original); 100008682 (increase)

Significant dates
- Added to NRHP: October 4, 2017
- Boundary increase: March 3, 2023

The East Des Moines Industrial Historic District is a nationally recognized historic district located in the East Village of Des Moines, Iowa, United States, directly east of the Downtown Des Moines area. At the time of its nomination it consisted of 45 resources, which included 31 contributing buildings, four contributing sites, three contributing structures, six non-contributing buildings and two non-contributing structures. It also includes the Northwestern Hotel, which was individually listed on the National Register of Historic Places (NRHP). The historic district was listed on the NRHP in 2017. The district's boundaries were increased in 2023 to include another building.

The period of significance is c. 1874, when the oldest building in the district was built, to 1956. It is a rare-surviving group of manufacturing, warehousing, and railroad-related properties in the city. In 1957 plans for what is now Interstate 235 were announced. Urban Renewal districts were added to this area in subsequent decades, which brought an end to investment in the district. The contributing buildings are the last remaining warehouse and manufacturing buildings that are left on the near east side of Des Moines. The contributing structures include two railroad bridges and a pump house and the contributing sites are the locations of extant or former railroad rail bed and rail siding segments. The district's "buildings, structures, and sites that show variety in architectural appearance, materials, and technological progression reflective of the period of significance."
