= Velma Wallace Rayness =

- Born: 31 October 1896; Davenport, Iowa, U.S.
- Died: 15 April 1977 (aged 80); Ames, Iowa, U.S.
- Occupation(s): Artist; author; art instructor
- Known for: Teaching art; book illustrations; participation in Public Works of Art Project

Velma Wallace Rayness (1896–1977) was an American artist, writer, and instructor who lived in Iowa. She usually signed her paintings "V.W. Rayness."

== Biography ==
Velma Wallace-Rayness was born on October 31, 1896, in Davenport, Iowa, the daughter of William W. and Eva Wallace. According to Iowan historical archives, her father was employed as a "painter" in the Des Moines, Iowa 1910 census and was listed as a "house painter" in 1920. Velma herself was employed as a "school artist" in 1920.

She was educated at East High School in Des Moines and studied art with Harriet Macy. She later studied with Charles Atherton Cumming and graduated from the Cumming School of Art in Des Moines where she then taught painting from 1926 to 1931. On 2 November 1929, she married Gerard M. Rayness in Des Moines; both were students of the artist Cumming and both taught at the Cummings Art School.

With her husband, she built a home and studio in 1934 at 3022 Oakland Street in Ames, Iowa, where she lived for over 50 years. Many Ames children and housewives took art lessons here.

According to the Iowa census, Velma was living with her husband and her husband's parents in Ames in 1930. She was listed as a "private school teacher" and her husband as a "public school teacher".

They moved to Ames permanently in 1932 and opened a studio near Iowa State University. Andrew Rayness, Gerard's father, was occupied as a "college teacher" in 1930, which may have influenced Gerard and Velma's choice.

They both taught art to adults and children, and she continued to teach after Gerard's death. Their studio was open for 23 years. She also worked under Grant Wood in the Public Works of Art program in 1933. Both Gerard and Velma were active in the Iowa Art Guild.

Rayness was also an avid sketch artist, author and book illustrator. She sketched and wrote the book Campus Sketches of Iowa State College, published in Ames by the Iowa State University Press in 1949. The second edition of the book was published in 1962 and named Campus Sketches of Iowa State University. The first edition can be located at the Iowa State University libraries in their Special & General Collection department. Rayness also collaborated on Charles Atherton Cumming: Iowa's Pioneer Artist-Educator in 1972, published by the Iowa Art Guild. She also illustrated a book called The Corn is Ripe in 1944. Rayness is mentioned in the 1939 book, The First One Hundred Years of Iowa Artists by Zenobia Ness & Louise Orwig.

Rayness was mentioned in Dictionary of Women Artists by Pettys, Who Was Who in American Art by Falk, Davenport's Art Reference & Price Guide, Index of Artists by Mallett, and several editions of American Art Annual. She can also be found in Who's Who of American Women by Marquis. She won numerous awards and prizes for her work as an artist.

There are only three privately owned paintings currently known to exist. One of these is Roof Tops in Fall on gouache paper, which is a sketch/watercolor that measures 16x20", sold at auction in 2005.

Rayness died in April 1977. Her husband had died 31 years earlier in 1946. Both artists died in Ames.

Velma and Gerard Rayness bequeathed archived information, diaries, paintings and sketches to Iowa State University.

== Exhibitions ==
Rayness exhibited her sketches and paintings at the:

- Des Moines Women's Art Club
- Iowa State Fairs
- Davenport Museum of Art
- Sioux City Art Center
- Corcoran Gallery of Art 1934
- Cornell College
- The Iowa Art Guild
- All Iowa Exhibit
- Iowa Art Salon, 1935
- Public Works of Art Project Exhibition
- Carson Pirie Scott and Company, Chicago
- Joslyn Art Museum in Omaha, NE
- Brunnier Gallery, 1976

Some examples and dates of exhibits include:

- Iowa Art Guild 59th Annual Exhibition at the Gallery, Iowa State Memorial Union, August 21, 1973 – September 13, 1973 – includes a brief history of the guild by Rayness as historian
- Iowa Art Guild sixty second annual exhibition of paintings, Iowa State University Memorial [Union] Gallery, September 12, 1976
- Brunnier Gallery, August 22–24, 1976;
- Artists in Ames: an exhibit drawn from the Gerard & Velma Rayness Collection Dept. of Special Collections, Iowa State University Library, through April 23, 1976

Her paintings and sketches can be found at other locations as well.

== Paintings ==
- Nude (1919)

Oil on canvas, 24 x 16 in.
Study of a young black woman; a very early work done at the Cumming School of Art in Des Moines where the artist was a student and later teacher.
Conserved November 2007 by David Marquis at Midwest Art Conservation Center, Minneapolis, with funding provided by Dennis Wendell.

- Cafeteria (1952)

Casein on board, 14x18 in.
Rustic frame with glass; subject: hogs and chickens feeding in front of red barn; exhibited at Memorial Union Gallery August 22–25, 1976 courtesy of Dr. and Mrs. George Hegstrom

- Untitled (1959)

Watercolor, 12x18 in.
Matted and framed with glass 20x26; subject: wooded hillside in winter with house in distance [probably on Oakland Street]

- Fruit and Flowers (1966)

Oil on canvas, 14 ¼ x 30 ¼ in.
Exhibited in Brunnier Gallery, Au.ust 22–24, 1976.
Given to Betty Teague by the artist in 1977.

- Hillside in Winter (1971)

Oil on Masonite panel, 18 x 24 in. Scene on Oakland Street in west Ames.
Exhibited at Iowa Art Guild, 1971.

Examples of her art exist in Ames in private collections and at the university. Families treasure portraits of their children painted by Rayness. By her own count, she painted 200 portraits and as many landscapes. Portraits of Dr. Charles E. Bessey and Dr. I.E. Melhus painted by Rayness hang in Bessey Hall on campus. Brunnier Gallery has four other works. Collegiate Presbyterian Church in Ames has Christ feeding the multitude, a 60 x 80 in. painting done in 1944, hanging in a third floor room.

== Newspaper articles on Rayness ==
- "Ames Show Features Work of Pioneer Iowa Artist", Des Moines Sunday Register, June 10, 1973
- Pam Witmer, "Ames Artist Teaches Her Students to See", Ames Tribune, August 14, 1976 (with photo of Rayness in The House That Art Built on Oakland Street)
