= Baker–DeVotie–Hollingsworth Block =

- U.S. National Register of Historic Places
- U.S. Historic district – Contributing property
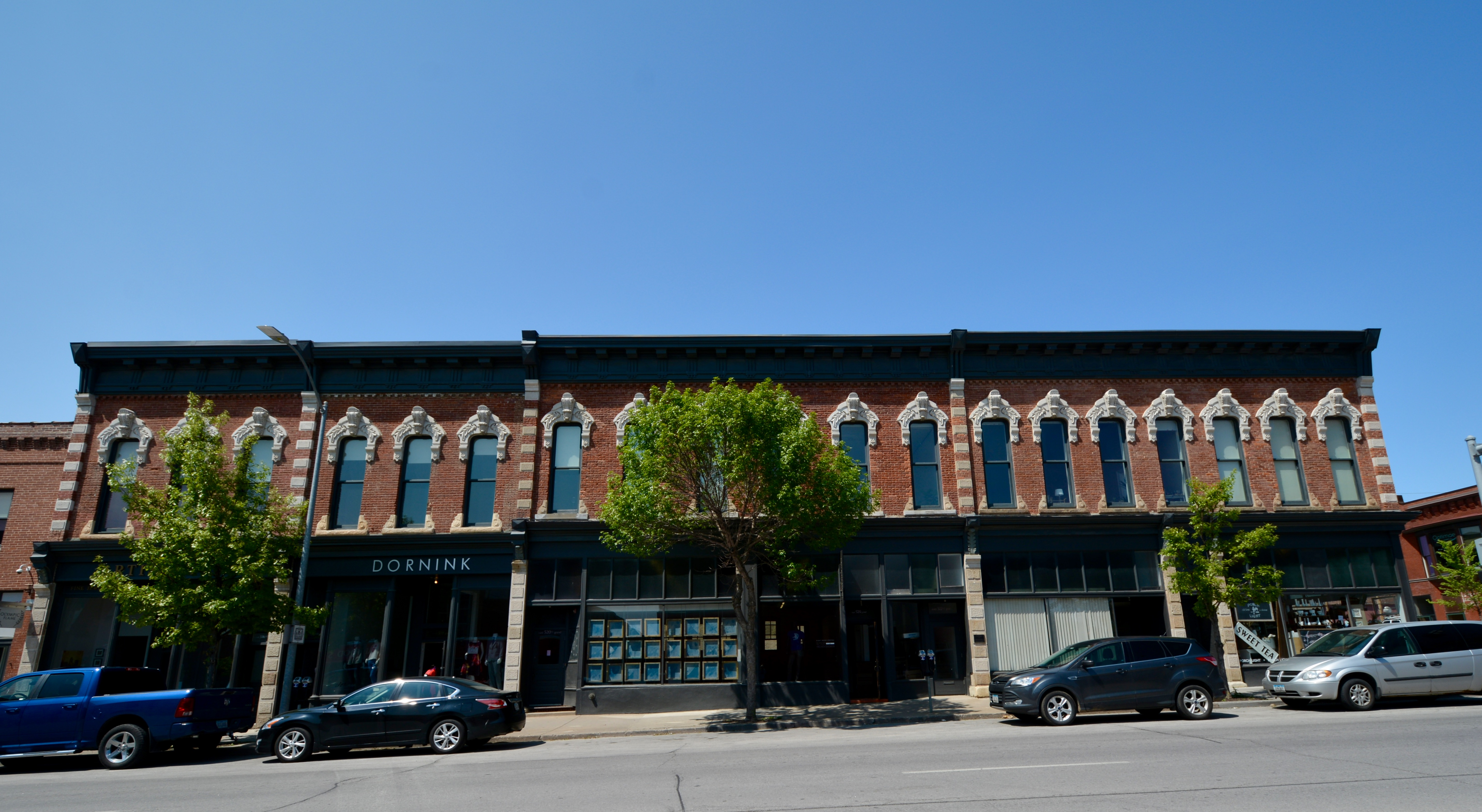

- Location within Iowa Location within the United States
- Location: 516–526 E. Grand Ave. Des Moines, Iowa
- Coordinates: 41°35′27.7″N 93°36′38.4″W
- Area: less than one acre
- Built: 1877, 1883
- Architectural style: Italianate
- Part of: East Des Moines Commercial Historic District (ID100003523)
- NRHP reference No.: 78001256 (original); 07001358 (increase)

Significant dates
- Added to NRHP: November 14, 1978
- Boundary increase: January 10, 2008

The Baker–DeVotie–Hollingsworth Block is a historic trio of buildings in the East Village of Des Moines, Iowa, United States. The eastern two-thirds of the block was listed on the National Register of Historic Places in 1978 as the Studio Building. The western one-third was added to the National Register in 2008, and its name was changed at that time. In 2019 the entire building was included as a contributing property in the East Des Moines Commercial Historic District.

== History ==
The eastern two commercial blocks were built by Duane DeVotie and George R. Baker. Baker opened his grocery store in the commercial space of at least the corner block, but it probably took up both. DeVotie, who owned the land the building was constructed on, built the third commercial block in 1883 at the same time as the Hollingsworth Brothers Block to the west was built. The buildings housed a variety of business over the years. At the end of the 19th century, it housed drug and grocery stores. After that, it housed funeral parlors and furniture stores. The Spring Hub Bicycle Manufacturing Company occupied the western storefronts from 1912 to 1967. It was the only Des Moines company that manufactured bicycles. The upper floor of the corner block housed professional offices, and apartments were located on the upper floor of the Devotie Block. In 1922 the exterior was faced with cement and scored to look like stone. It was at this time that the original window hoods were lost. Restoration to its original appearance began in 1976. The building is currently home to office and residential space.
