= Robert Spencer Finkbine =

American builder and politician

R. S. Finkbine
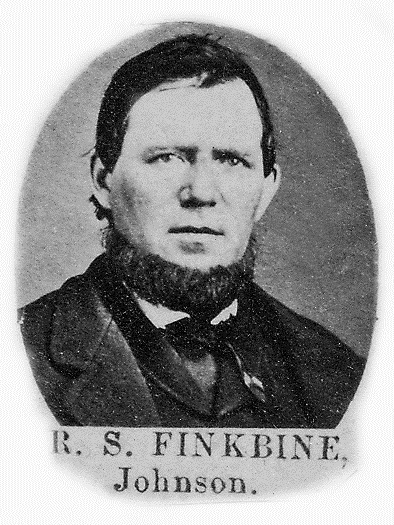
- Finkbine, c. 1900
- Born: July 9, 1828; Oxford, Iowa, U.S.
- Died: July 8, 1901 (aged 72); Des Moines, Iowa, U.S.
- Occupations: Builder-architect; politician

Robert Spencer Finkbine (July 9, 1828 – July 8, 1901) was an American builder-architect and Republican politician. He helped build the Iowa Braille and Sight Saving School and part of the University of Iowa. Finkbine was the superintendent of construction of the Iowa State Capitol.

== Personal life ==
Finkbine was born on July 9, 1828, in Oxford, Ohio, to Francis and Jane Finkbine. He married Rebecca Finch on April 27, 1852, and they had four children. He was part of the Independent Order of Odd Fellows. Finkbine died on July 8, 1901, in Des Moines, Iowa.

== Career ==
Finkbine trained to be a carpenter in Ohio until he was 22 years old, with him moving to Iowa City, Iowa, to work as a carpenter and contractor. In 1853, he became a business partner of Chauncy F. Lovelace to form the company Finkbine & Lovelace. They were listed as "master builders" in an 1868 Iowa City directory. Finkbine helped build the Iowa Braille and Sight Saving School in Vinton, some University of Iowa buildings, and other public buildings in Iowa.

Finkbine was elected as a Republican representative to the state legislature in 1864, and he had a two-year term in which he was also the head of the House Committee on Ways and Means. L. F. Andrews, who often visited the Capitol during its construction, said, "Socially, he was courteous, plain of speech and manner, evidencing his German ancestry; always effervescent with wit and humor; of high moral temperament: an ardent supporter of church and school." In 1873, Finkbine moved to Des Moines. He was chosen in that same year to be the superintendent of construction of the Iowa State Capitol, and the book Iowa's Historic Architects said that he made sure that it was "erected with no trace of graft, corruption, or shoddy workmanship". Over $2.5 million was spent on the Capitol's construction during his 13-year tenure in that position. No money was wasted or stolen during the Capitol's construction due to Finkbine's work. His family moved to Des Moines in 1880. Finkbine served with the Board of Public Works from 1890 to 1894, when he retired from business. Finkbine & Lovelace ended sometime between 1873 and 1880.
