= Syndicate Block (Des Moines, Iowa) =

- U.S. National Register of Historic Places
- U.S. Historic district – Contributing property
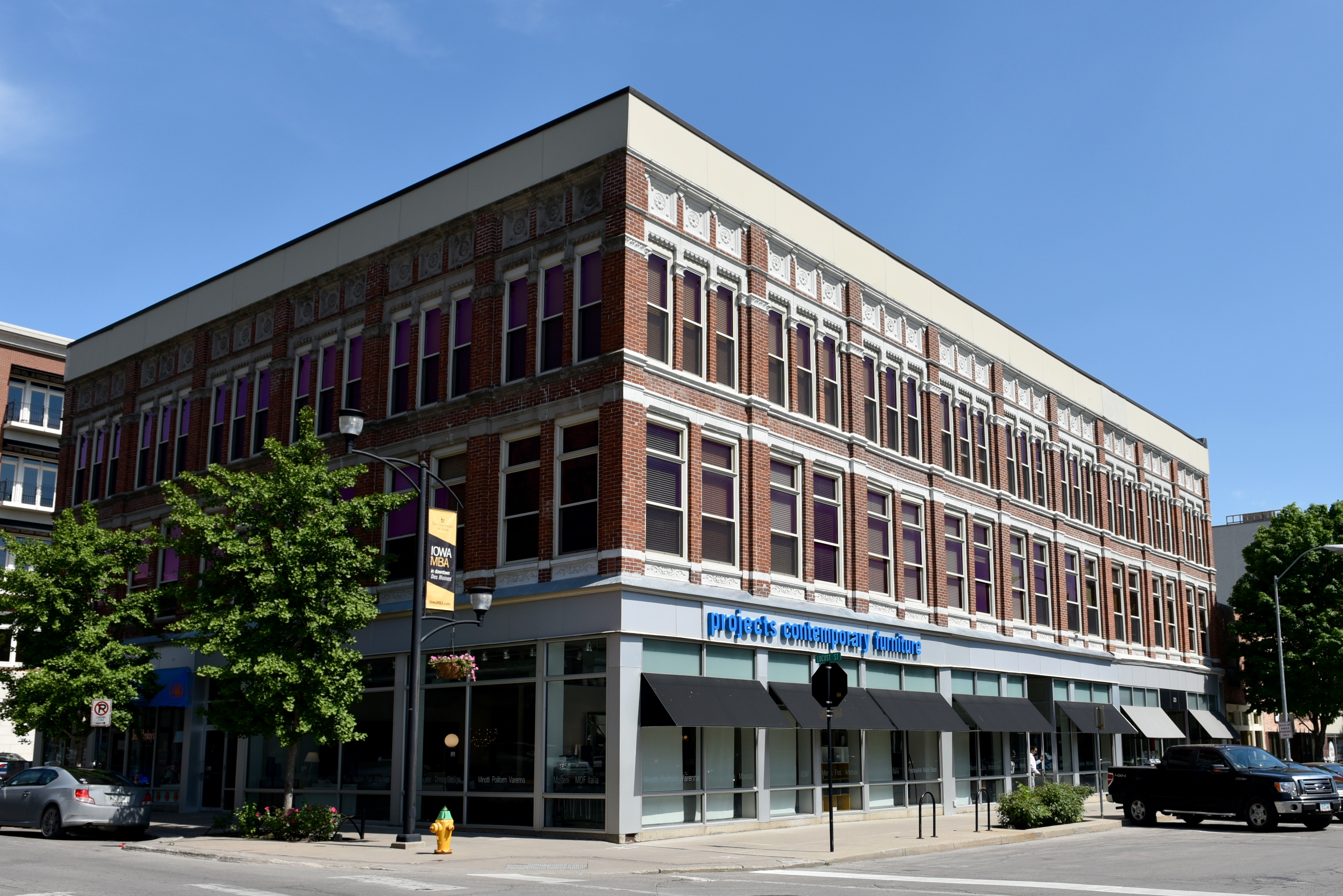

- Location within Iowa Location within the United States
- Location: 501 E. Locust St. Des Moines, Iowa
- Coordinates: 41°35′22.2″N 93°36′39.1″W
- Area: less than one acre
- Built: 1883
- Architectural style: Renaissance Revival
- Part of: East Des Moines Commercial Historic District (ID100003523)
- NRHP reference No.: 01001059
- Added to NRHP: October 1, 2001

The Syndicate Block, also known as the McCoy Building, is a historic building located in the East Village of Des Moines, Iowa, United States. It was individually listed on the National Register of Historic Places in 2001. In 2019 the building was included as a contributing property in the East Des Moines Commercial Historic District.

== History ==
The property on which the building stands was originally owned by one of the first settlers in Polk County, Conrad Dietz. Dietz was a German farmer who settled in the area in 1847. He sold one of the lots in 1876 to the proprietors of a hardware store, Entwistle & O’Dea. The rest of the land was leased to shopkeepers and craftsmen. By 1883 there was a row of small wood-frame buildings on the property near the intersection of Fifth and Locust Streets that had the appearance of a small town Main Street. This three-story brick structure was built by a group of East Side businessmen in 1883 three blocks from the Iowa State Capitol, and it reflects its Renaissance Revival style. It also stands out in an area of Italianate commercial buildings. The first floor has housed a variety of retail businesses over the years and the upper floors have housed various professionals and business firms. The building currently houses several commercial enterprises.
