= Hohberger Building =

- U.S. National Register of Historic Places
- U.S. Historic district – Contributing property
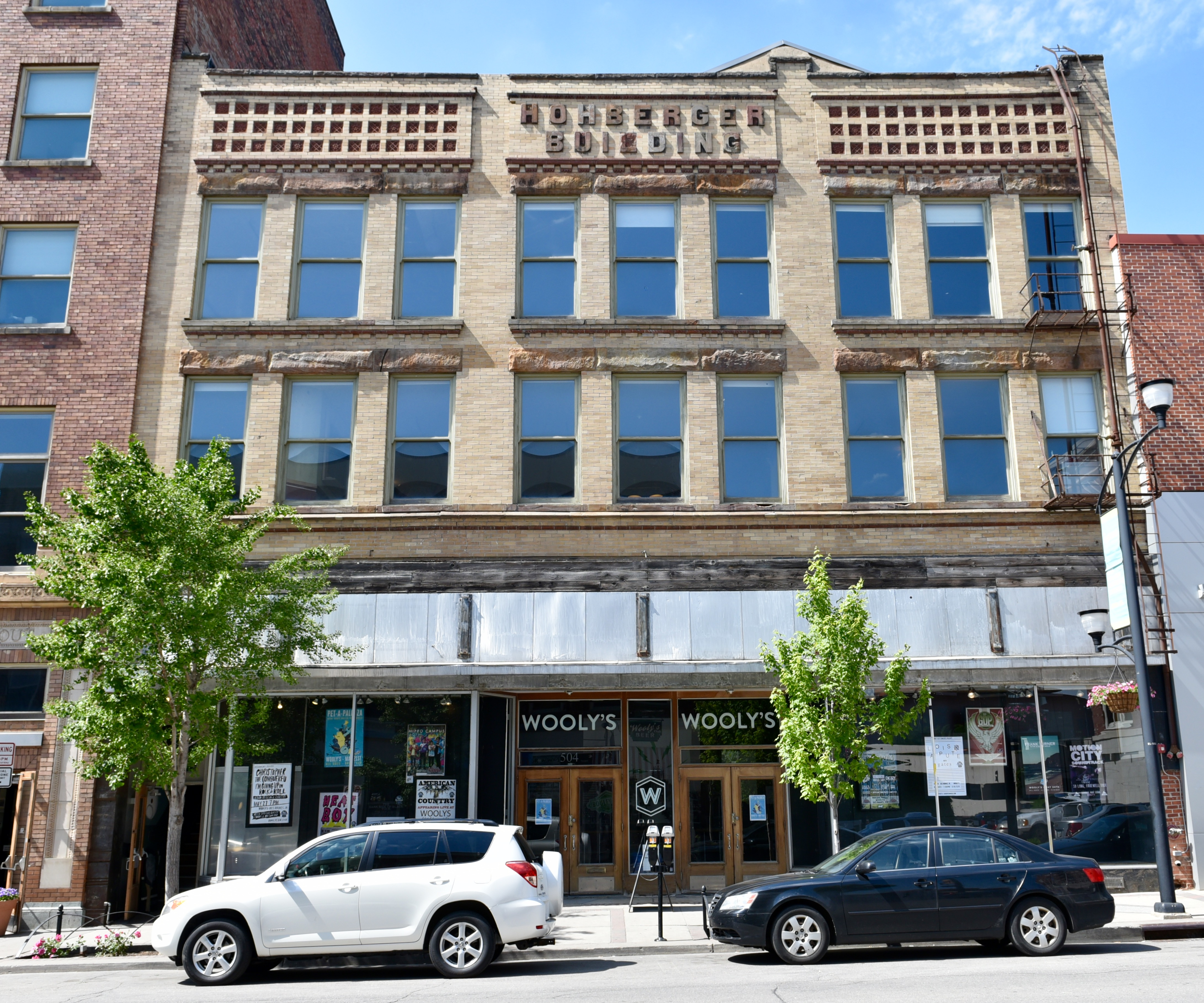

- Location within Iowa Location within the United States
- Location: 502-506 E. Locust St. Des Moines, Iowa
- Coordinates: 41°35′24″N 93°36′39″W
- Area: less than one acre
- Built: 1898
- Architectural style: Late Victorian
- Part of: East Des Moines Commercial Historic District (ID100003523)
- NRHP reference No.: 02001019
- Added to NRHP: September 12, 2002

The Hohberger Building is a historic building located in the East Village of Des Moines, Iowa, United States. The building was built in 1895 and is one of the few remaining examples of a cast-iron column structure in the city. A dry goods store named Dockstader & Co. was the first retail establishment to occupy the building (1899–1915). The building stood empty for several years until it was renovated in 1999. The ground level of the building remains retail space and the upper floors are occupied by offices. It was individually listed on the National Register of Historic Places in 1978.In 2019 it was included as a contributing property in the East Des Moines Commercial Historic District.
