= Polk County Courthouse (Iowa) =

- U.S. National Register of Historic Places
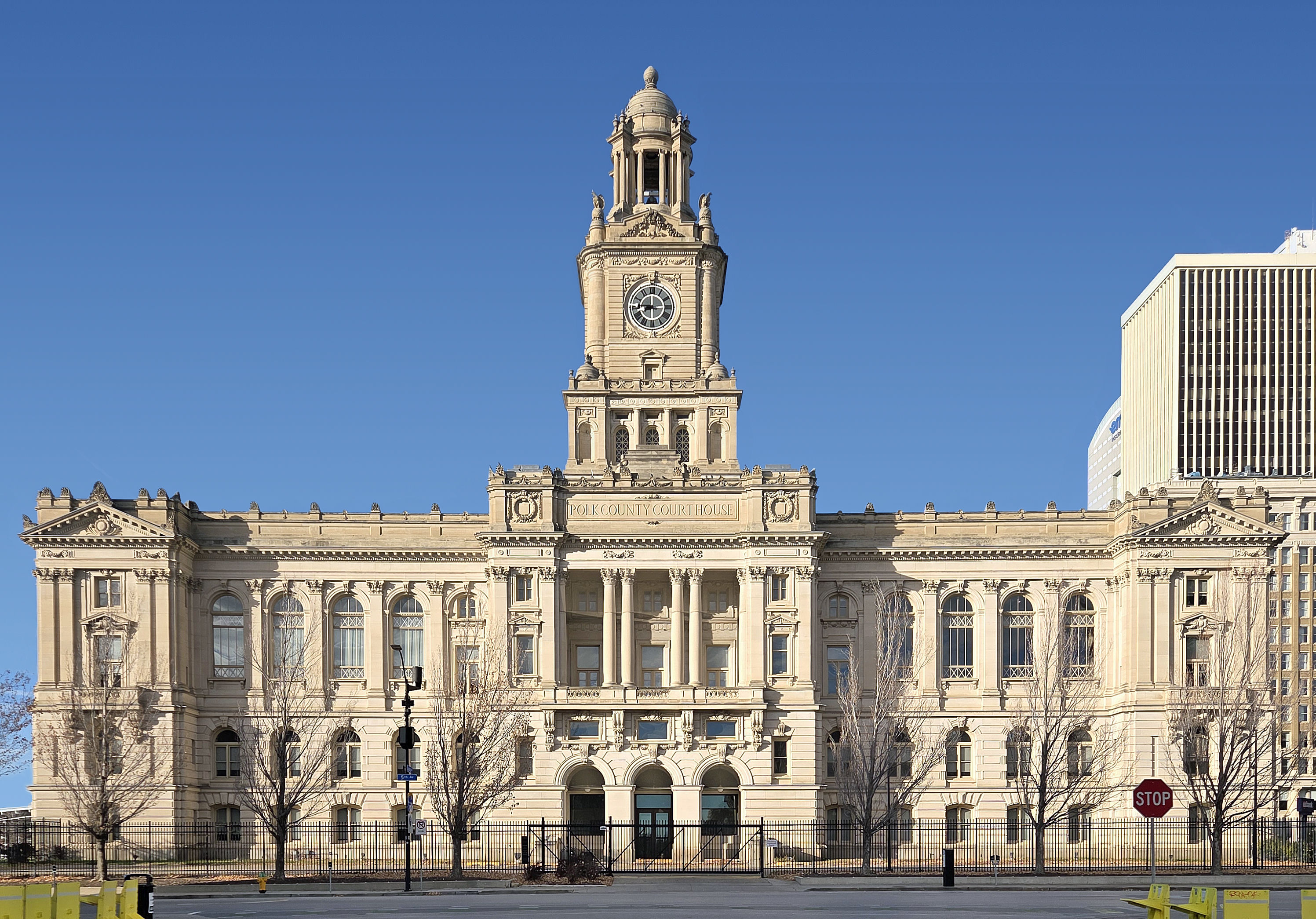
- Polk County Courthouse viewed from the east

- Location within Iowa Location within the United States
- Interactive map showing the location of Polk County Courthouse
- Location: 500 Mulberry Street, Des Moines, Iowa
- Coordinates: 41°35′5″N 93°37′23″W
- Area: approximately 2 acres (0.81 ha)
- Built: 1906
- Architect: Proudfoot & Bird
- Architectural style: Beaux-Arts
- MPS: County Courthouses in Iowa TR
- NRHP reference No.: 79000925
- Added to NRHP: April 30, 1979

The Polk County Courthouse located in Des Moines, Iowa, United States, was built in 1906. It was listed on the National Register of Historic Places in 1979 as a part of the County Courthouses in Iowa Thematic Resource. The courthouse is the third building the county has used for court functions and county administration.

== History ==
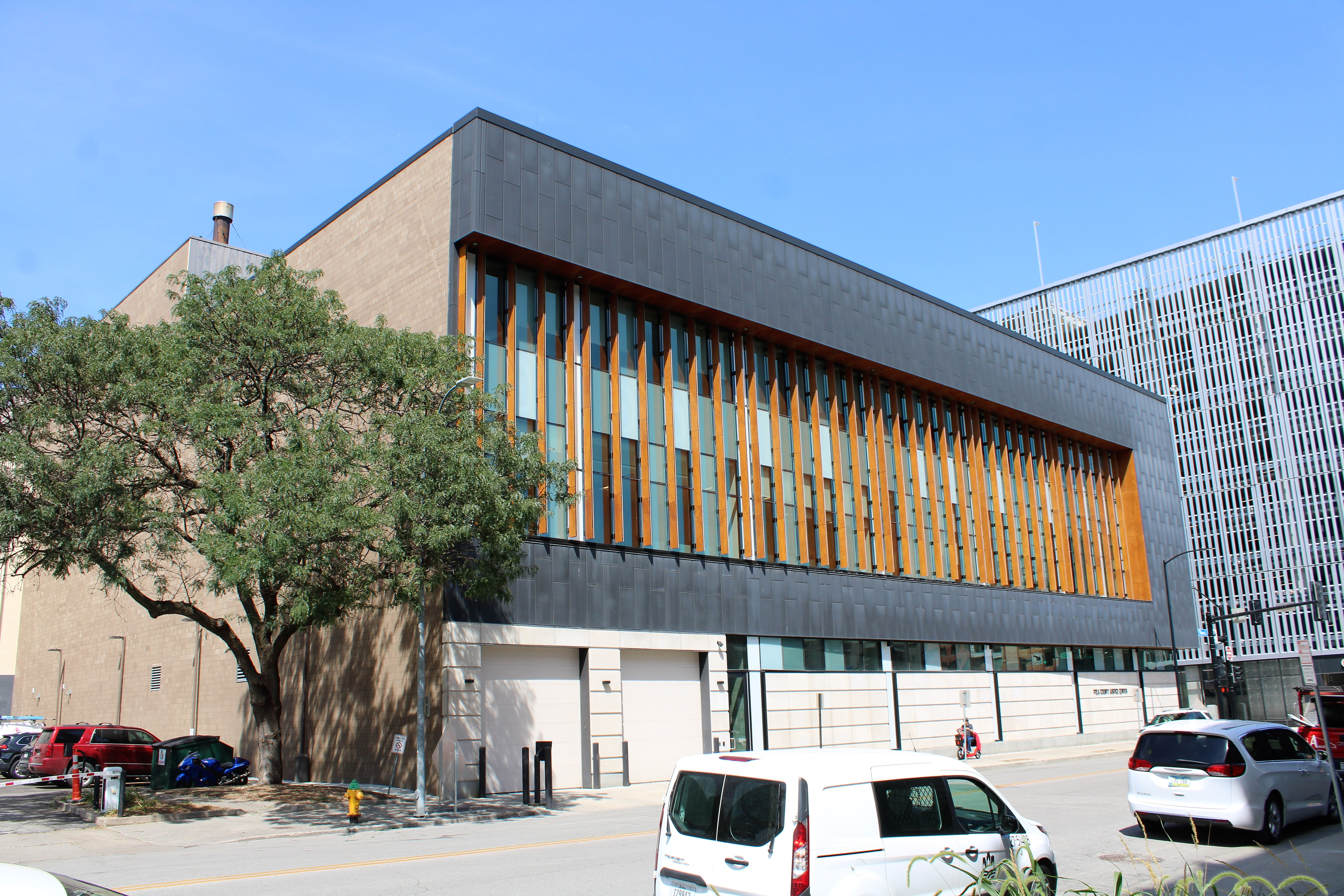
Polk County Justice Center

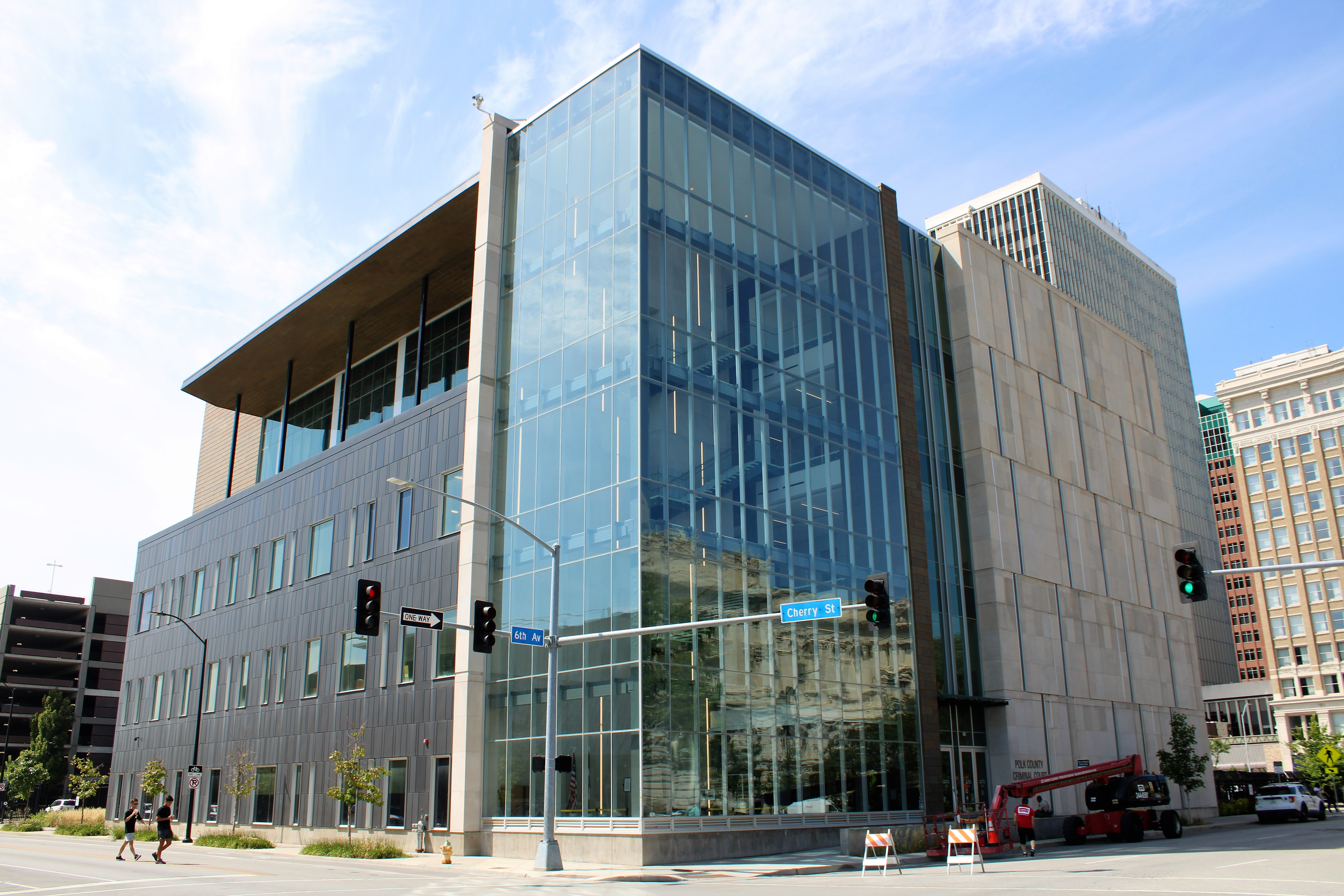
Polk County Criminal Court

Polk County built its first courthouse in 1847 for $2,015. The brick building measured 52 by 26 feet (15.8 by 7.9 m). It was located to the south of the present building. After the second courthouse was completed, this first building was sold to a church for $800. It later became the Union Depot serving the Wabash and the Des Moines Union Railroads. The second courthouse was built in 1858 for $94,000. The two-story Italianate structure, designed by J.C. Farrand, featured a dome. The building measured 102 by 66 feet (31 by 20 m) and the dome rose to a height of 87 feet (27 m). This building was enlarged in 1866.

The present courthouse was built in 1906 on the same square as the previous courthouse. It was built for $750,000 in the Beaux-Arts style. Measuring 242 by 132 feet (74 by 40 m), the rectangular structure was designed by the Des Moines architectural firm of Proudfoot & Bird. It is one of the largest county courthouses in the state, and one of the most architecturally significant.

For most of its history, the courthouse hosted both criminal and civil courts. Beginning in 2010, Polk County began a multi-year project to divide court functions between several buildings. A former department store on an adjacent lot was converted into the Polk County Justice Center, which houses the Polk County Attorney as well as juvenile, traffic, and small claims courts. The former county jail (also on a lot adjacent to the courthouse) was partially demolished and rebuilt to host the criminal courts. After this realignment, the historic courthouse hosts only civil court cases.

== Architecture ==
The courthouse is a four-story structure composed of Grey Canyon Sandstone. In the center is a projecting loggia with three arches on the first story and eight Corinthian columns rising from the third floor to the top of the fourth floor. Projecting pavilions are located on each corner. A tall three-stage square clock tower capped with cupola rises from the center of the building. The interior features a large stained glass domed rotunda, marble columns, and murals by Charles Atherton Cumming and Edward Simmons.
