= Teachout Building =

- U.S. National Register of Historic Places
- U.S. Historic district – Contributing property
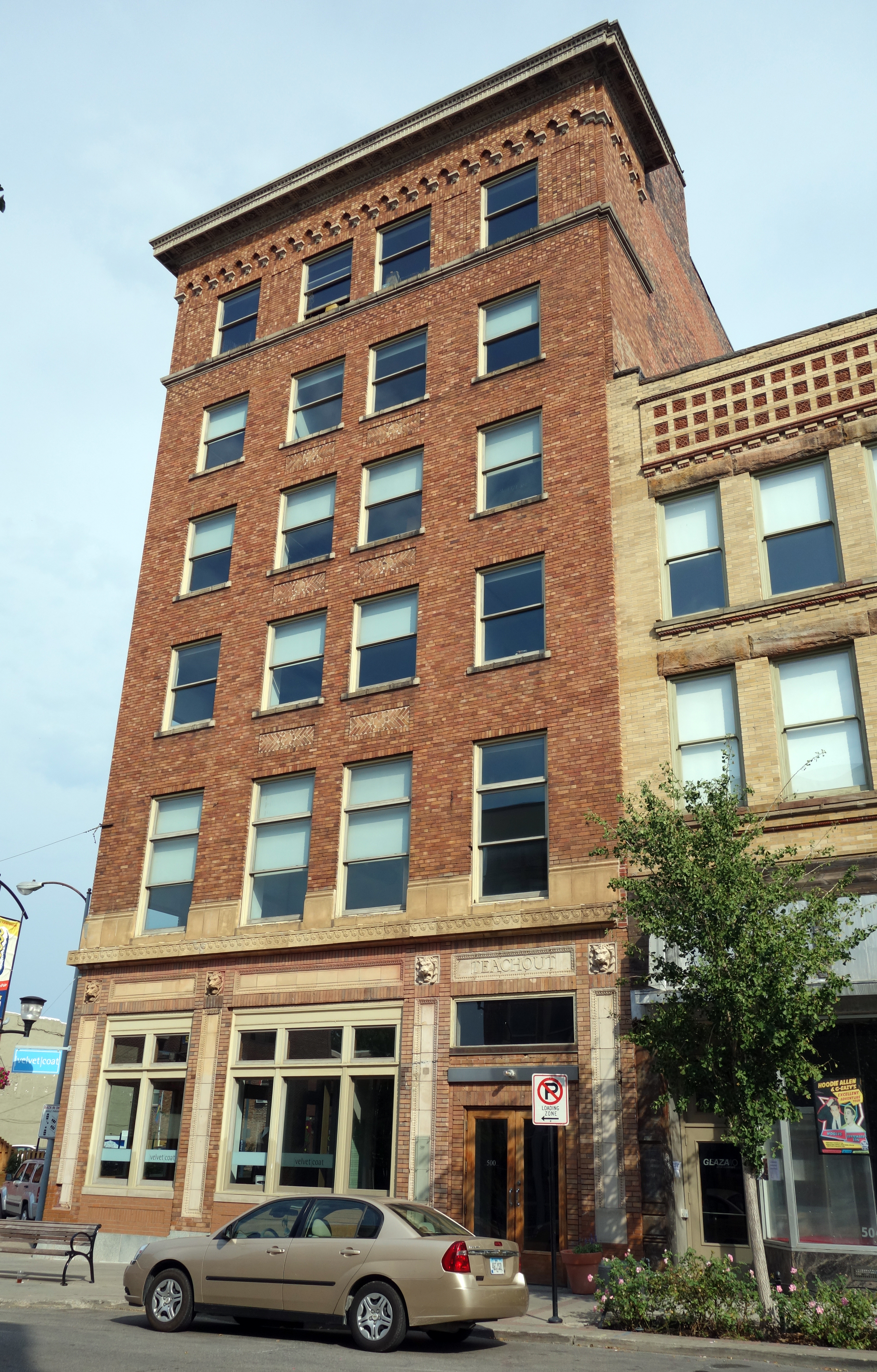

- Location within Iowa Location within the United States
- Location: 500-502 E. Locust St. Des Moines, Iowa
- Coordinates: 41°35′23.7″N 93°36′39.8″W
- Area: less than one acre
- Built: 1912
- Architect: Proudfoot, Bird and Rawson
- Architectural style: Early Commercial
- Part of: East Des Moines Commercial Historic District (ID100003523)
- MPS: Architectural Legacy of Proudfoot & Bird in Iowa MPS
- NRHP reference No.: 99000491
- Added to NRHP: April 29, 1999

The Teachout Building is a historic building located in the East Village of Des Moines, Iowa, United States. It was individually listed on the National Register of Historic Places in 1999. In 2019 the building was included as a contributing property in the East Des Moines Commercial Historic District.

== History ==
Horace E. Teachout, for whom the building was named, was a developer who helped plan the East Village. He started planning for what would be the tallest building on the east side of Des Moines in 1911, and it would be completed a year later. The prominent Des Moines architectural firm of Proudfoot, Bird and Rawson designed the building in the Early Commercial style. It was one of the few high-rise buildings designed by the firm. A renovation of the building was begun in the 1970s, but was not completed because of the completion of the MacVicar freeway, Interstate 235, allowed people to bypass the area for other parts of the city and suburbs and made this section of Des Moines less desirable. It sat empty until it was eventually renovated in the 1990s. It currently houses retail businesses, offices and a private residence on the sixth floor.
