= North Western Hotel, Morecambe =

Midland Hotel
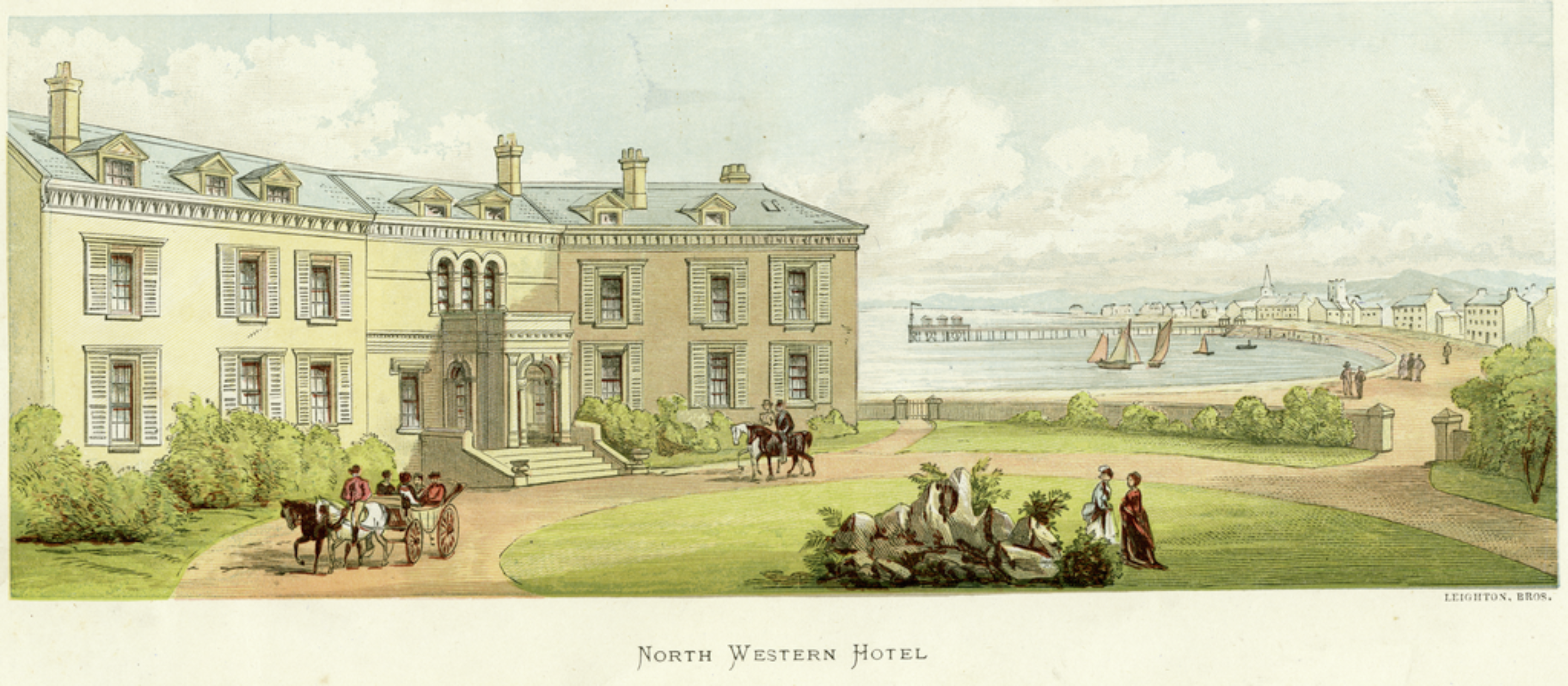
- Engraving of the North Western Hotel

- Location within Morecambe
- Former names: North Western Hotel

General information
- Type: Hotel
- Architectural style: Georgian
- Location: Morecambe, Lancashire, England
- Coordinates: 54.0721°N 2.8754°W
- Construction started: 1847
- Completed: 1848
- Closed: 1932
- Demolished: 1932
- Cost: £4,795
- Owner: Midland Railway

Technical details
- Material: Grey stone with green shuttered windows
- Floor count: 2

Design and construction
- Architect: Edward Paley
- Architecture firm: Paley and Austin

Other information
- Number of rooms: 40

The North Western Hotel in Morecambe, Lancashire, England, was built in 1847–48. It was designed by the Lancaster architects Paley and Austin for the "Little" North Western Railway. Including furnishings, it cost £4,795 (equivalent to £480,000 in 2025). It was a two-storey building containing 40 bedrooms. In 1871, when the railway became part of the Midland Railway, its name was changed to the Midland Hotel. It was demolished and replaced by a new hotel, also called the Midland Hotel, in 1932.
