= North-Western Hotel, Livingstone =

Hotel in Zambia

Coordinates: 17.84556°S 25.86028°E

The Northwestern Hotel is located in Livingstone, Zambia and was built in 1907 by Mrs and Mr Freddie Mills. It was actually the second hotel of that name; the previous North Western Hotel, built in 1906 by railway contractors Pauling and Co., was converted into government offices.

Activities such as dances and public meetings took place there and the hotel is said to have opened the first multi-racial bar in the town in 1961.

Northwestern Hotel, in Livingstone, Zambia is now defunct. It has been owned outright by the Hitchins family since 1947, and was run as a successful business by the family matriarch until the 1990s. Since then it has been through several transformations, from hotel to trading centre, to shops and offices. The building is listed as a national monument, a status which prohibits substantial modernisation.
