= East Village (Des Moines) =

Neighborhood and district of Des Moines, Iowa

- East Des Moines Commercial Historic District
- U.S. National Register of Historic Places
- U.S. Historic district
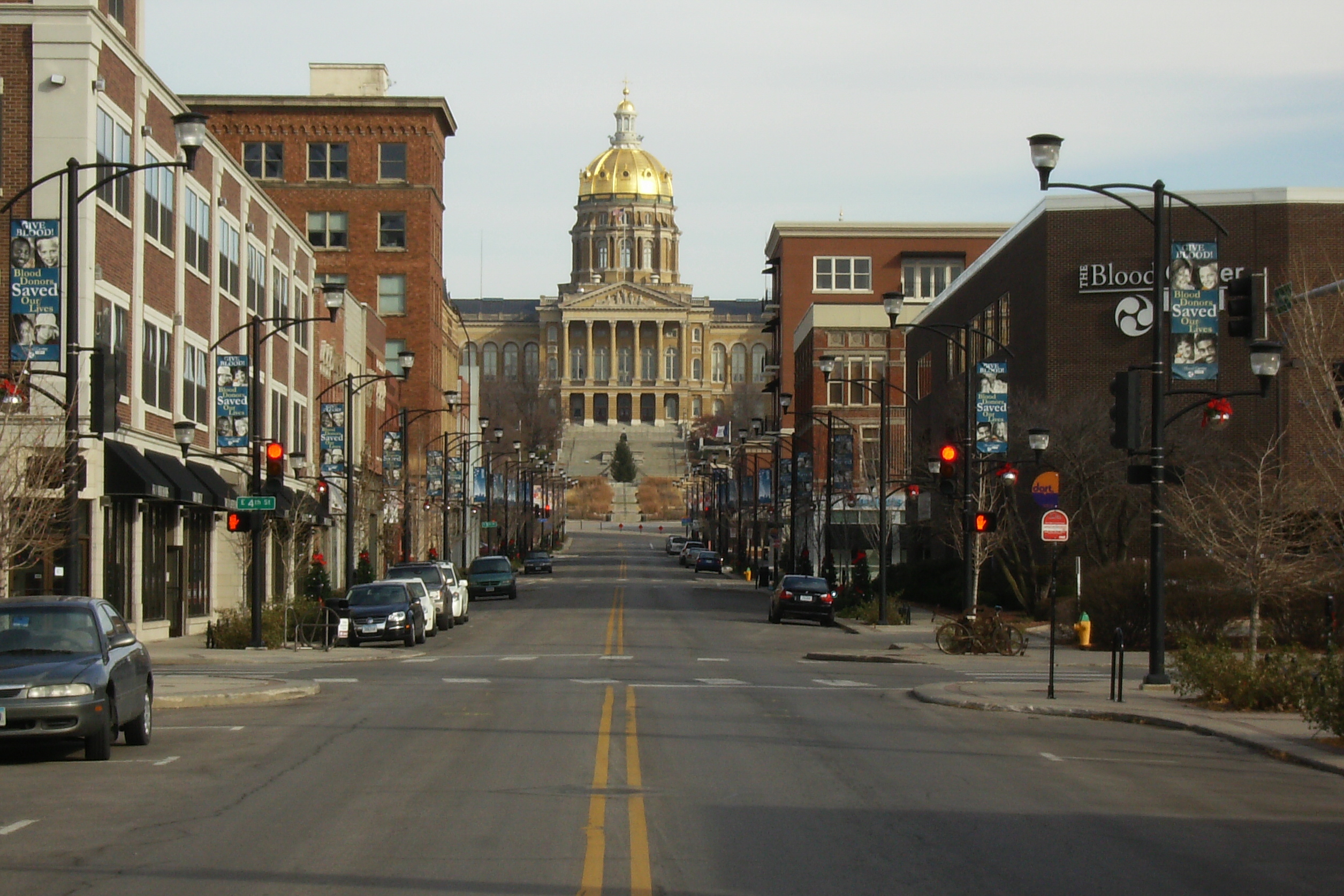
- Facing East on E. Locust Street

- Location within Iowa Location within the United States
- Location: Roughly bounded by E. 4th, Des Moines, E. 6th, and E. Locust Sts., Des Moines, Iowa
- Coordinates: 41°35′26.5″N 93°36′41.8″W
- NRHP reference No.: 100003523
- Added to NRHP: March 22, 2019

Historic East Village is a commercial and residential neighborhood in central Des Moines, Iowa, United States, directly east of the Downtown Des Moines area. The neighborhood is bounded by Interstate 235 on the north, the Des Moines River on the west and south, and East 14th Street on the east. It also sits adjacent to the Historic Court District, which sits west across the Des Moines River. Part of the East Village forms a nationally recognized historic district that was listed on the National Register of Historic Places in 2019.

Many state and municipal buildings exist within the East Village. These include the Iowa State Capitol complex (including the Iowa Supreme Court), the State of Iowa Historical Museum, and the Des Moines Botanical Gardens.

== History ==
Capitol Hill Lutheran Church

The East Village was platted in 1854. Several of the 40 buildings that make up the historic district are associated with European immigrants, especially Scandinavians and Eastern European Jews, that began settling the city's near east side in the 1870s and 1880s. There were three periods of construction in the district. The first period was from the 1840s to the 1890s. Many buildings were wood-framed and included single-family homes, double-houses, and row houses. The ones that remain have been remodeled for commercial use while others have been replaced by commercial buildings. The second period lasted from the 1870s to the 1920s. These buildings were predominantly constructed of brick in styles that were popular at the time, including Italianate, Gothic Revival, Romanesque Revival, Queen Anne, Neoclassical, and Commercial architecture. Included in this group of buildings is the only known surviving row house on the east side of Des Moines, and the only surviving church in the district (Capitol Hill Lutheran Church). The third period lasted from the 1920s to the 1950s and the buildings reflect the influences of the automobile on their design and usage. It includes buildings that were a part of the East Des Moines Auto Row. Architectural styles from this period include Modernism, Art Deco, Commercial, and Moderne.

In 2000, the City of Des Moines slated several buildings in the neighborhood for demolition, however, a group of individuals came together to advocate saving the buildings. Many of the structures stand today as homes to eateries, boutique shops, and loft-style housing.

National Register of Historic Places individual listees within the neighborhood include:

- Iowa State Capitol
- Baker-Devotie-Hollingsworth Block
- Hohberger Building
- Municipal Building
- Northwestern Hotel
- Ola Babcock Miller Building
- Syndicate Block
- Teachout Building

== Subculture ==
East Village has a "strong, independent scene".

The yearly Capital City Pride festival is held here. In 2019, the festival drew at least 25,000 individuals, breaking the previous festival records. Iowa's first-in-nation caucuses makes the state significant for politicians courting LGBT support. The presidential candidates who appeared at the 2019 festival include Beto O'Rourke, John Delaney, Kirsten Gillibrand, Marianne Williamson, Andrew Yang, Jay Inslee, Bernie Sanders, and Tim Ryan.
