= Northwestern Hotel (Des Moines, Iowa) =

- U.S. National Register of Historic Places
- U.S. Historic district – Contributing property
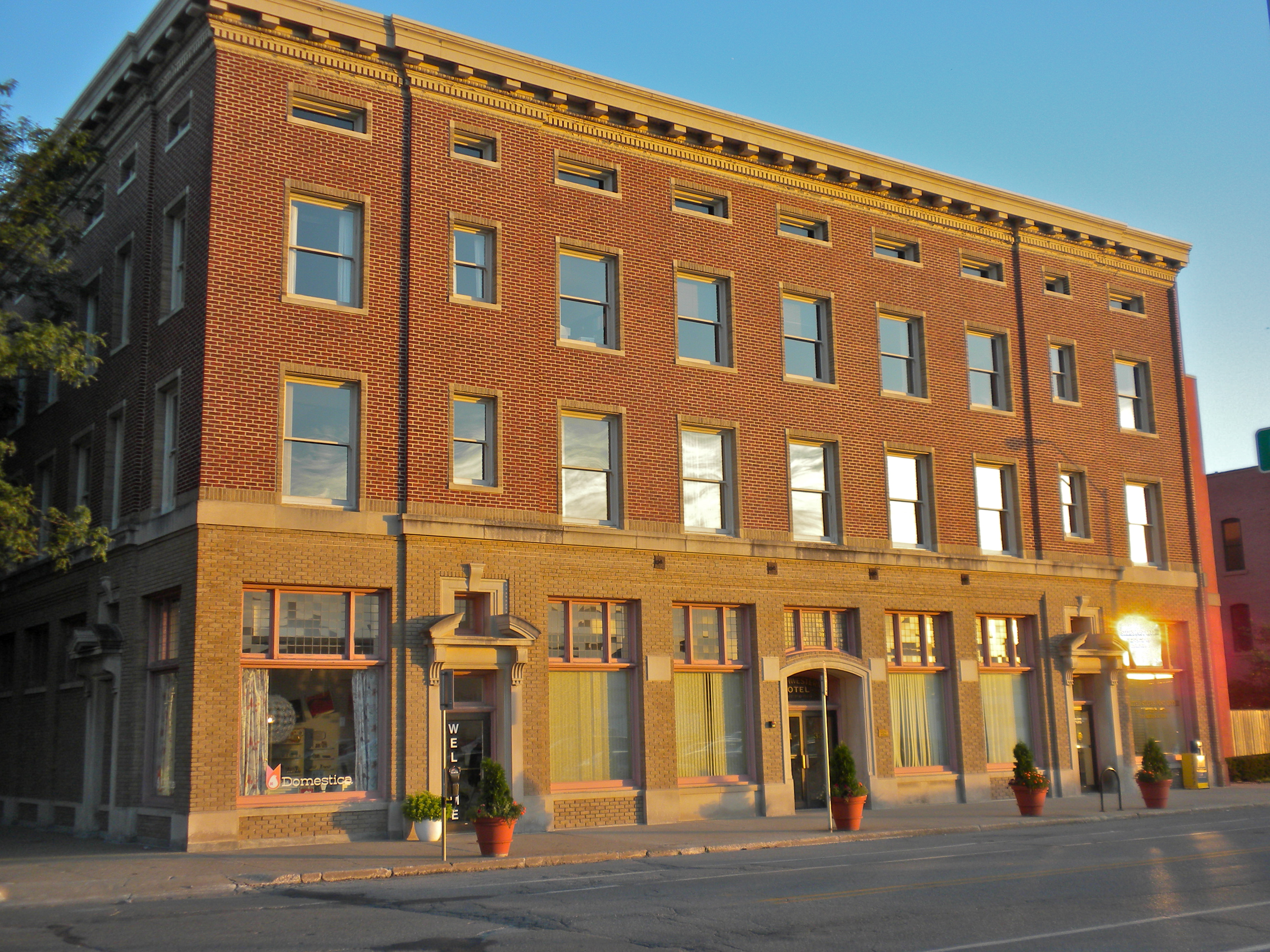

- Location within Iowa Location within the United States
- Location: 321 E. Walnut St. Des Moines, Iowa
- Coordinates: 41°35′16.9″N 93°36′45″W
- Area: less than one acre
- Built: 1916
- Architect: Proudfoot, Bird & Rawson
- Architectural style: Renaissance Revival
- Part of: East Des Moines Commercial Historic District (ID100001700)
- NRHP reference No.: 84001300
- Added to NRHP: January 12, 1984

The Northwestern Hotel is a historic building located in the East Village of Des Moines, Iowa, United States. It was listed on the National Register of Historic Places in 1984. In 2017 it was included as a contributing property in the East Des Moines Industrial Historic District.

== History ==
Opening in 1916, the Northwestern Hotel was built to serve the needs of railroad employees and passengers from the nearby Chicago and North Western depot, and other people of modest means. It was particularly popular with people during the Iowa State Fair. The hotel also had an arrangement with the railroad to accommodate its employees in their rooms. This building replaced a previous hotel with the same name in the same location. It was built by Otto Starzinger, whose parents Frank and Anna built and ran the hotel before him. Other businesses housed on the first floor included a restaurant, cigar stand, and a drug store. Eventually, the building went into a slow period of decline before Polk County officials forced it to close in 1982. A group of lawyers remodeled the building for office use in 1983. The building currently houses retail space on the first floor.

== Architecture ==
The building was designed by the prominent Des Moines architectural firm of Proudfoot, Bird & Rawson. It is a three-story structure with a decorative cornice at the roofline. Most of the building's decorations were limited to the lobby of the hotel when it was constructed. The first floor housed retail space in addition to the hotel's lobby. A ballroom, with its own skylight, and guest rooms were on the second floor. The guest rooms of the second and third floor were generally small and were arranged around spaces with skylights. Some of the larger suites, which had a view of the capitol building, had their own bathrooms. The other guest rooms shared bathrooms. The building was originally designed to be six stories high, but it had to be scaled back to three. However, the underpinnings of the building exist to support additional stories, and cast concrete supports and a fourth-floor fireplace are located in the attic.
