= C. J. A. Ericson =

American politician (1840–1910)

Charles John Alfred Ericson (March 8, 1840 – August 7, 1910) was a Swedish-born American businessman and politician.

Born in Södra Vi, Ericson moved with his family to Rock Island, Illinois, in 1852. In 1859, Ericson relocated to Mineral Ridge, Iowa. He was elected to the Iowa House of Representatives between 1872 and 1874, and served nonconsecutive terms in the Iowa Senate from 1896 to 1900 and 1904 to 1909, all as a Republican.

While in the state legislature he advocated for libraries on a statewide level. He was also a longtime member of the Iowa Library Association. He donated funds enabling the construction of the Ericson Public Library.

The names of Ericson Hall and Ericson Field and Ericson Park at Augustana College honored him for his matching donation of $12,800 enabling purchase of land vitally needed for expansion of the college. The Ericson Hall building was removed in 1939 to make way for the Ericson Athletic Stadium.

His 10-room, $8,000 home in Boone was commissioned to be designed by noted architect George E. Hallett of Des Moines and was to be "modern colonial" in style, adapting "the best of the old and the best of the new styles and arrangement.".

Documents of the Historical Department of Iowa records its 1903 addition to their collection of a bust of C.J.A. Ericson created by the Pugi Brothers studio of Florence, Italy.
