= Julius Scheibe Cottage =

Historic house in Iowa, United States

- U.S. National Register of Historic Places
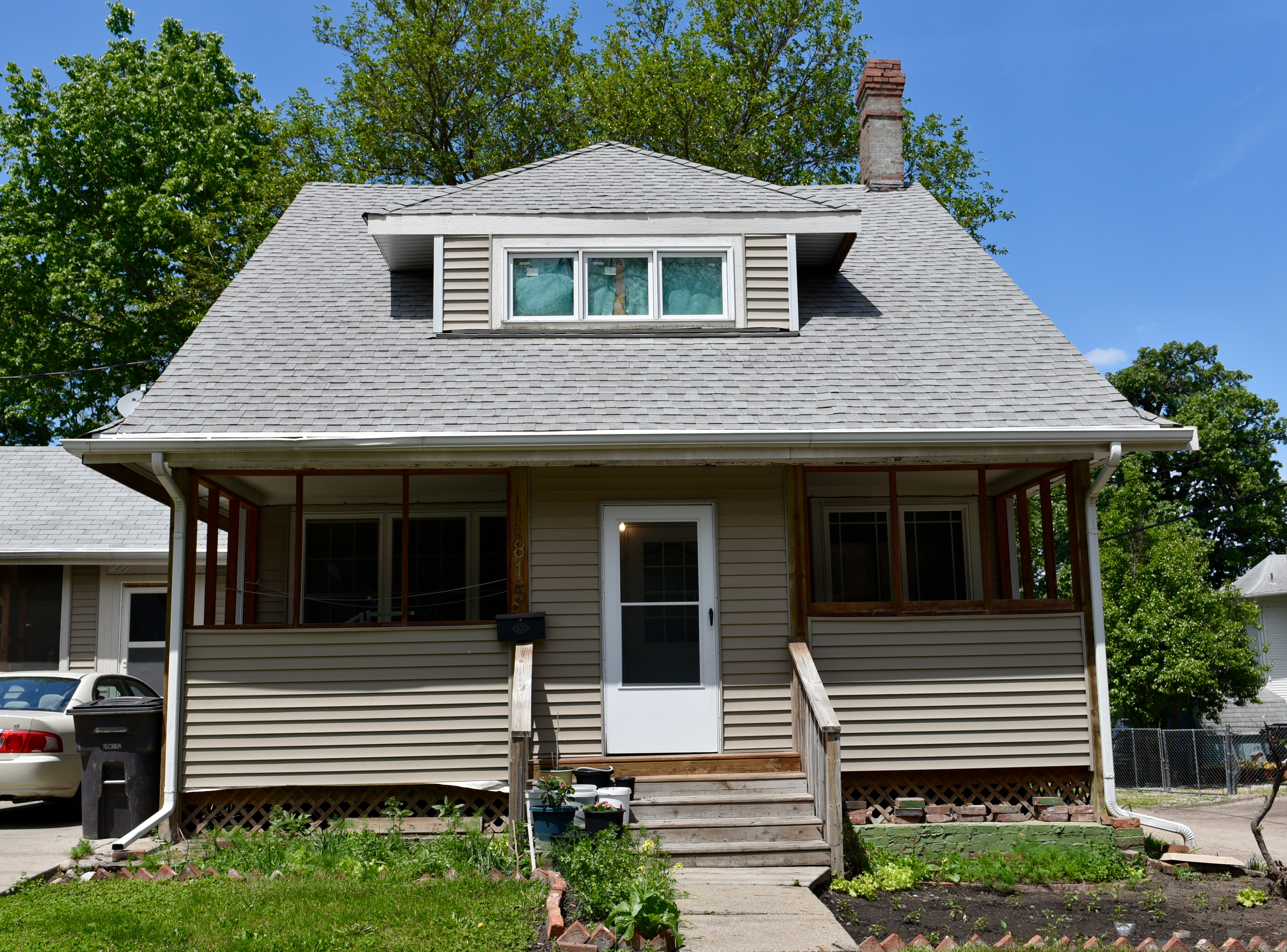

- Location within Iowa Location within the United States
- Location: 815 College Ave. Des Moines, Iowa
- Coordinates: 41°36′28″N 93°37′44″W
- Area: less than one acre
- Built: 1898
- Architect: Hallett, George E.
- Architectural style: Late 19th and Early 20th Century American Movements
- MPS: Towards a Greater Des Moines MPS
- NRHP reference No.: 98001281
- Added to NRHP: October 22, 1998

The Julius Scheibe Cottage at 815 College Ave. in Des Moines, Iowa, United States, was built in 1898. It was a work of architect George E. Hallett. It and the adjacent house (no longer extant) split a corner land parcel and both faced south, while all other houses in the area faced the east or west ends of their parcels. The "parcelization of corner lots" this way increased density and the value of their real estate.

Elements of American Movements architecture (American Craftsman architecture)in the house's design include its side-gabled roof, its inset front porch, and also its "symmetrically conceived facade; the facade dormer window with its inset configuration, deck, and bulkheads; the pent roof embellishing the side gables; and the multi-pane windows in the dormer." Houses with similar styling dot the neighborhood, including at the N.S. Wales House at 1814 West 9th Street, also designed by Hallett, and at 1460 5th Avenue. This and other Hallett ones include interior amenities such as fireplaces that are not often found in residences this small.

It was listed on the National Register of Historic Places in 1998. It was deemed significant as an example of "suburban architecture in the former City of North Des Moines, particularly to the stylistic influence of late 19th and early 20th Century American Movements, as practiced in that Victorian suburb and exemplified in the designs of George E. Hallett."
