= The Fowler Company Building =

- U.S. National Register of Historic Places
- U.S. Historic district – Contributing property
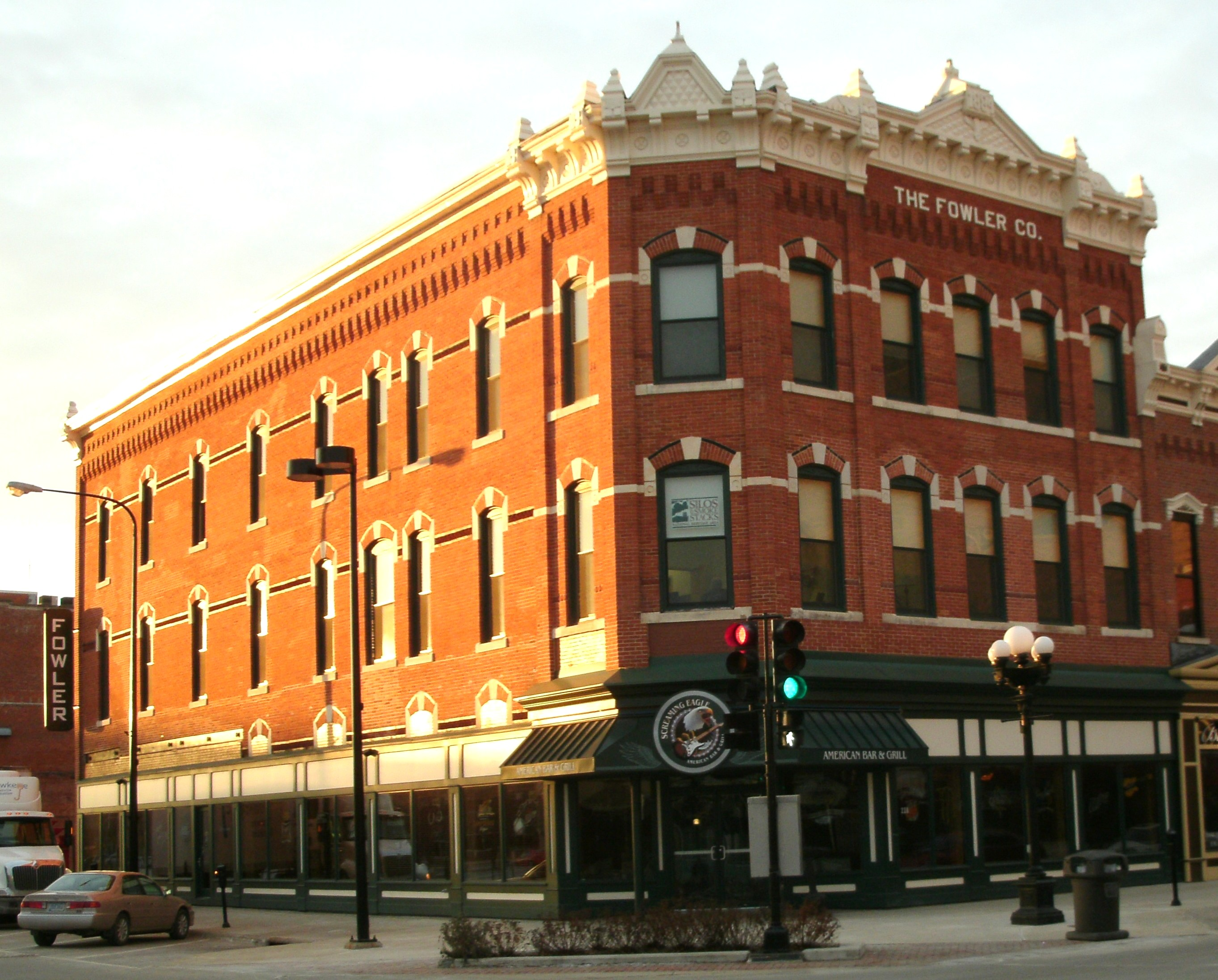

- Location within Iowa Location within the United States
- Location: 226-228 E. 4th St. Waterloo, Iowa
- Coordinates: 42°29′55.8″N 92°20′06″W
- Area: less than one acre
- Built: 1884
- Architectural style: Late Victorian
- Part of: Waterloo East Commercial Historic District (ID11000813)
- NRHP reference No.: 09000712
- Added to NRHP: September 16, 2009

The Fowler Company Building is a historic building located in Waterloo, Iowa, United States.

== History ==
It was built in 1884 by the city's most successful grocery wholesale business. They continued to operate from here until 1937. It was individually listed on the National Register of Historic Places in 2009. In 2011 it was included as a contributing property in the Waterloo East Commercial Historic District.

== Features ==
The three-story brick structure is an example of Late Victorian commercial architecture with Queen Anne influences. The building features pilasters, corbeling, canted-brick courses, and contrasting stone trim around and between the windows and at the street level. It is capped with an ornate metal cornice that contains pilasters, finials, pediments, floral and circle imagery, and quilted surface textures.
