= West Ninth Streetcar Line Historic District =

Historic district in Iowa, United States

- U.S. National Register of Historic Places
- U.S. Historic district
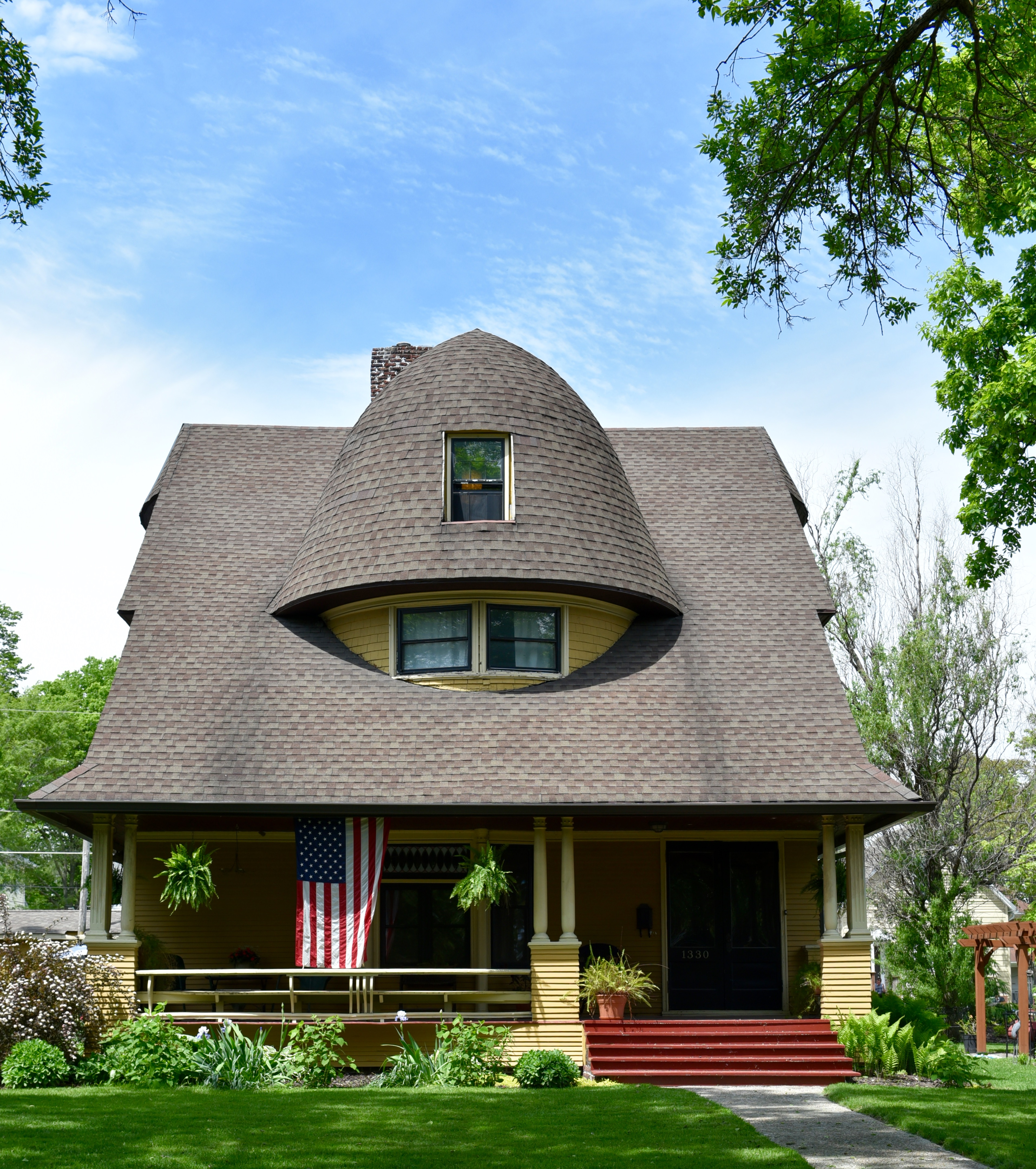

- Location within Iowa Location within the United States
- Location: W. 9th St. from University Ave. to Hickman Rd. Des Moines, Iowa
- Coordinates: 41°36′23″N 93°37′47″W
- Area: 11 acres (4.5 ha)
- Architect: Hallett & Rawson, et al.
- Architectural style: Late 19th and 20th Century Revivals; Late 19th and Early 20th century American movements Late Victorian
- MPS: Towards a Greater Des Moines MPS
- NRHP reference No.: 98000377
- Added to NRHP: April 23, 1998

The West Ninth Streetcar Line Historic District is located in the north-central section of Des Moines, Iowa, United States. The focus of the district is West Ninth Street from University Avenue on the south to Hickman Road on the north, which had a street car line that ran on it. It has been listed on the National Register of Historic Places since 1998. It is part of the Towards a Greater Des Moines MPS.

== History ==
The period of significance for the West Ninth Streetcar Line Historic District is 1883 to 1936, which was the timeframe that the street served as a streetcar route. It was Des Moines’ most fully developed streetcar corridor in the Victorian era and it remains largely intact. It was in competition with the West Sixth Streetcar Line. It was also developed earlier and ran on narrow gauge tracks. It was unique in Des Moines that more than one line would serve a single neighborhood. In addition, another line served Eleventh and Twelfth Streets. By being served by multiple lines shows the importance of North Des Moines as a Victorian-era suburb. In large part it was responsible for the housing boom in the area in the 1880s and 1890s.

The streetcar line was developed by the Des Moines Street Railroad Company as an extension of their downtown loop and was called the “Red Line.” Originally it was a horse-drawn line that was electrified under the direction of Jefferson S. Polk. Eventually, the Red Line was extended to Crocker Woods along the Des Moines River. It also served the east side of Des Moines and extended to the suburb of Capitol Park. The Ninth Street streetcar line ended service when it was replaced by gas-powered buses.

== Architecture ==
For the most part the buildings in the West Ninth Streetcar line Historic District are houses and their ancillary buildings, namely garages and stables. There are a total of 145 buildings. Of these 97 buildings are contributing properties. Most of the buildings are single-family houses. Nine of the buildings are multi-family dwellings, which include both double houses and apartment buildings, and 20 are ancillary buildings. The architectural styles employed in the district include the Stick style, Queen Anne, Colonial Revival, American Foursquare and American Craftsman. Two of the houses follow either the Shingle or the Prairie School styles. Most of the houses are built of wood; however, there are six that are masonry buildings.

There are also six institutional buildings, which are all non-contributing properties. The district also contains the former campus of Des Moines University, which merged with Highland Park College on the latter's campus. The property then became the campus of Dowling Catholic High School an institution of the Diocese of Des Moines. After it moved in the 1970s the main building was torn down and the property has been used for a variety of public and semi-public purposes.
