= W.A. McNeill House =

Historic house in Iowa, United States

- U.S. National Register of Historic Places
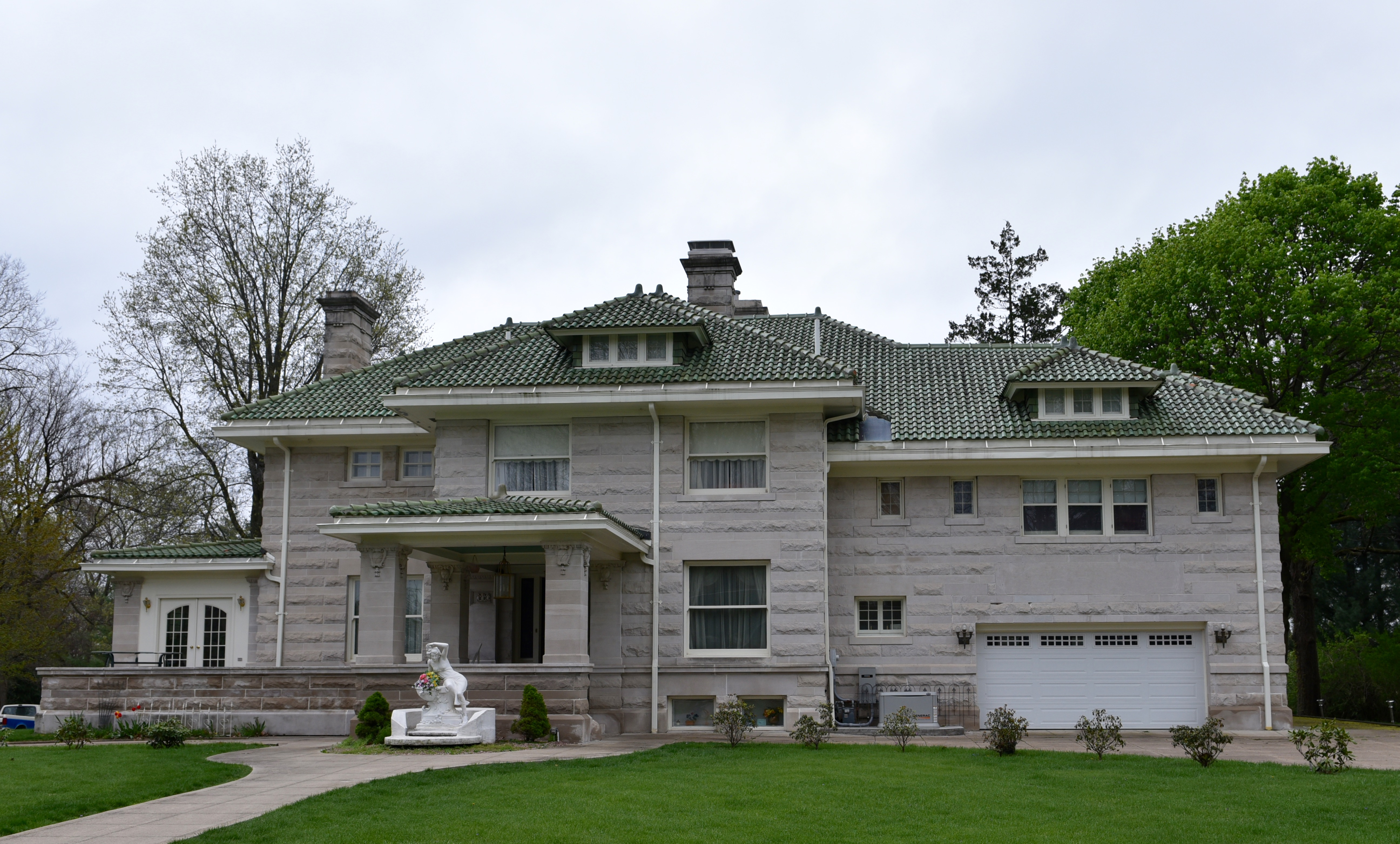

- Location within Iowa Location within the United States
- Location: 1282 C Ave. East; Oskaloosa, Iowa
- Coordinates: 41°17′54″N 92°37′36″W
- Area: 1 acre (0.40 ha)
- Built: 1909
- Architect: Hallett & Rawson; Zitteral, William
- Architectural style: Mission/Spanish Revival, Colonial Revival
- NRHP reference No.: 99001267
- Added to NRHP: October 21, 1999

The W.A. McNeill House at 1282 C Ave. East in Oskaloosa, Iowa was built in 1909. It was a work of architects Hallett & Rawson and of William Zitteral. It has also been known as the Abbott House. It was listed on the National Register of Historic Places in 1999.

It is operated as a bed & breakfast known as the McNeill Stone Mansion.
