= Waterloo East Commercial Historic District =

Historic district in Iowa, United States

- Waterloo East Commercial; Historic District
- U.S. National Register of Historic Places
- U.S. Historic district
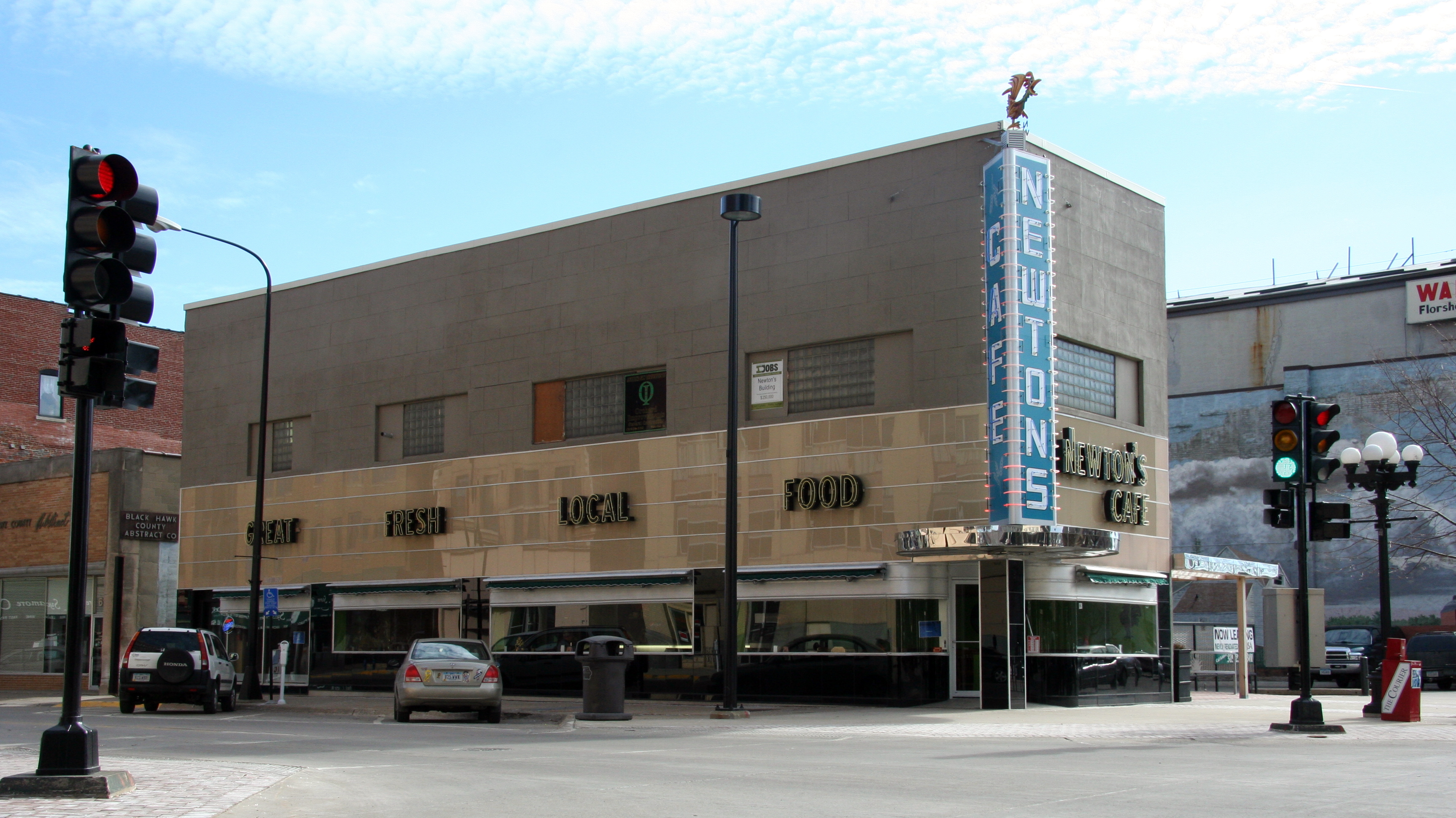
- Newtons (1918, 1956)

- Location within Iowa Location within the United States
- Location: 128-329 E. 4th, 612-616 Mulberry, 501-632 Sycamore Sts., Waterloo, Iowa
- Coordinates: 42°29′56″N 92°20′06″W
- Area: 8 acres (3.2 ha)
- Architectural style: Late Victorian; Late 19th & Early 20th Century Revivals
- MPS: Iowa's Main Street Commercial Architecture MPS
- NRHP reference No.: 11000813
- Added to NRHP: November 18, 2011

The Waterloo East Commercial Historic District is a nationally recognized historic district located in Waterloo, Iowa, United States. It was listed on the National Register of Historic Places in 2011. At the time of its nomination the district consisted of 36 resources, including 28 contributing buildings, and eight non-contributing buildings. The city of Waterloo was established in the early 1850s. Its first settlers started developing the west side of the city before crossing the Cedar River and developing east side. The first Black Hawk County Courthouse was built on the east side in 1856 and East Waterloo Township was created two years later. As industry began to develop along the river, and the arrival of the first railroad in 1861, the commercial district on the east side began to grow. Also on the east side of town was the terminus of the streetcar-turned-interurban system. By 1900, the city became one of the primary wholesale and retail centers in northeastern Iowa. In 1911 the Black population increased significantly as workers, primarily from Mississippi, moved into town to work for the Illinois Central Railroad. The following year the saloons in town were closed and bootlegging, gambling, drugs, and prostitution started to increase in the area surrounding the central business district. All of these developed put together created the atmosphere of the downtown commercial district.

For the most part, the commercial buildings in the district are constructed of brick and are two to three stories in height. There are also several taller multi-story buildings located here, and they represent the "high water mark in the district’s physical development." All of the buildings follow the styles popular at the time of their construction, including Italianate, Neoclassical, and Commercial. Architects who have buildings in the district include John Bartley, John T. Burkett, Howard B. Burr, Mortimer Cleveland, George Ellis, Hallett & Rawson, Emile G. Jehle, Josselyn & Taylor, Joseph C. Llewellyn, John G. Ralston, Fred G. Shaw, and Clinton P. Shockley. Fires in the 1920s and 1950s impacted the appearance of the district as most of the fire-damaged were given stylish new facades. Several other buildings were given updated facades in the 1940s and the 1950s. The buildings that do not contribute to the historic integrity of the district had their facades resurfaced in more recent decades. The Fowler Company Building (1884) and the Marsh-Place Building (1910) are individually listed on the National Register of Historic Places.
