= Rumely–Des Moines Drug Company Building =

- U.S. National Register of Historic Places
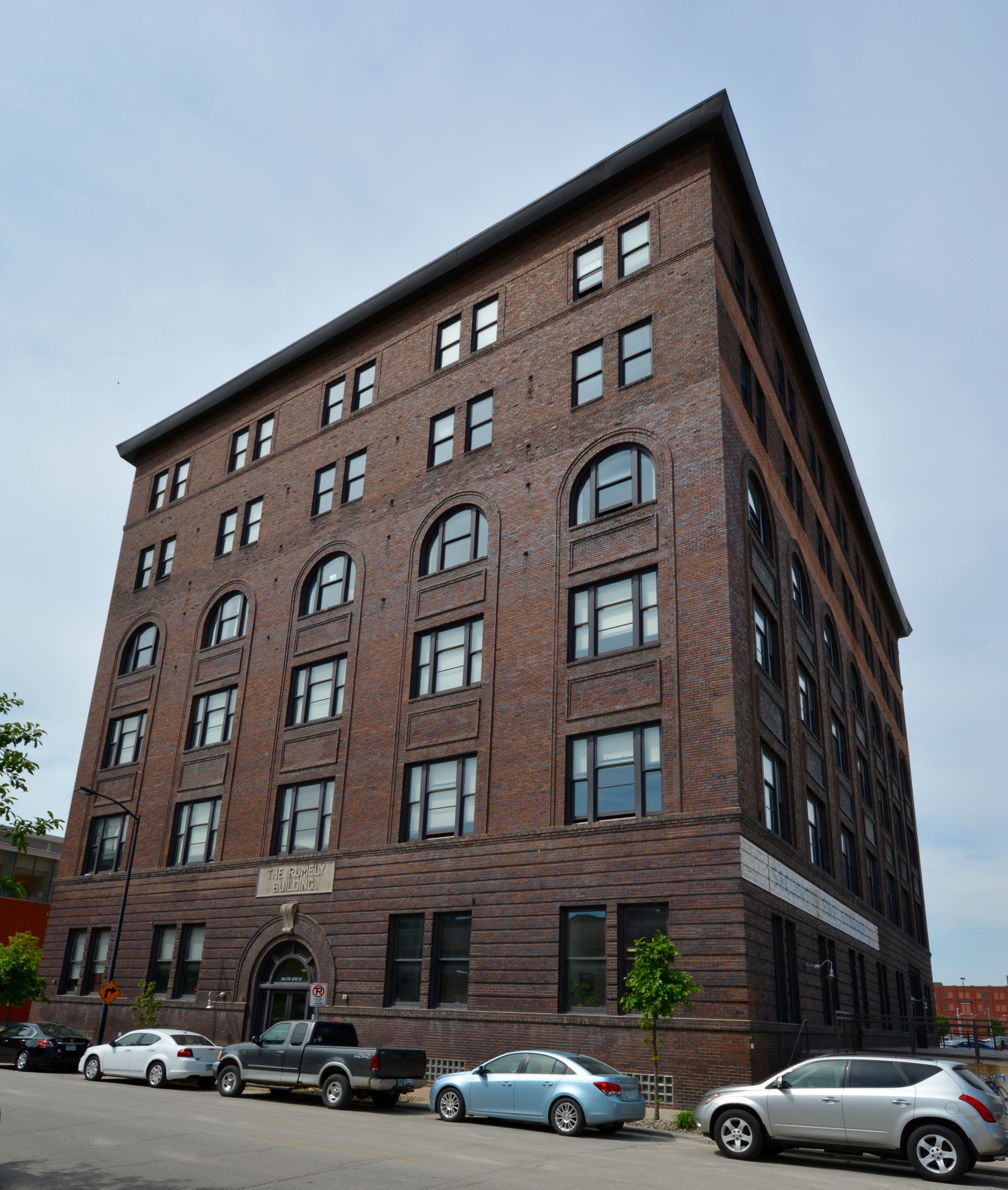

- Location within Iowa Location within the United States
- Location: 110 SW. Fourth St. Des Moines, Iowa
- Coordinates: 41°34′59.7″N 93°37′17″W
- Area: less than one acre
- Architect: Hallett & Rawson
- Architectural style: Chicago, Commercial Style
- NRHP reference No.: 89002008
- Added to NRHP: November 16, 1989

The Rumely–Des Moines Drug Company Building at 110 SW. Fourth St. in Des Moines, Iowa is a large brick warehouse block building. It is a work of architects Hallett & Rawson. It has also been known as the Rumely Bldg, as the Federal Machine Corp Bldg, and as the Security File Warehouse Building. It was listed on the National Register of Historic Places in 1989.
