= Humboldt Public Library =

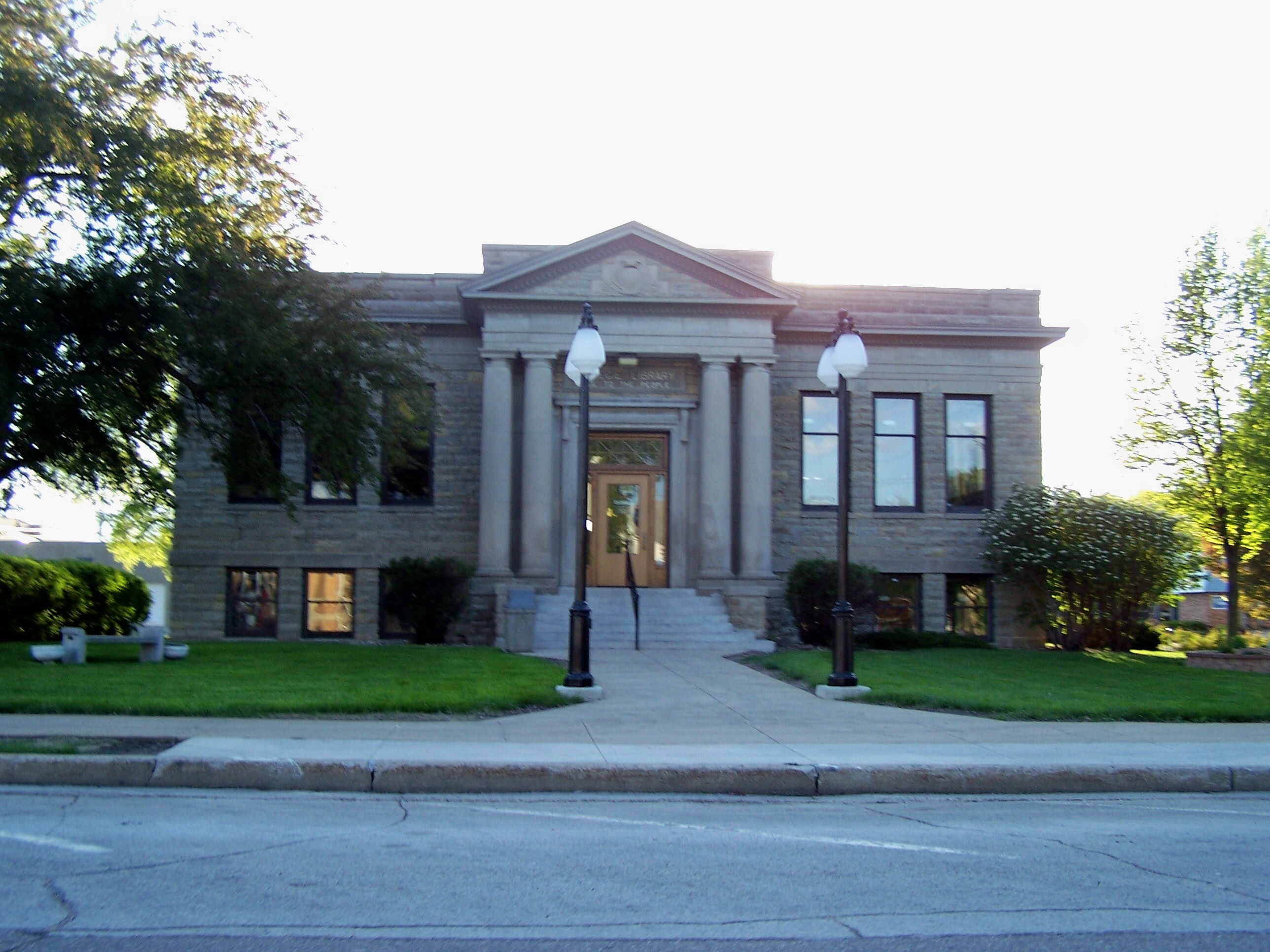
- Humboldt Public Library east entrance
- Location: 30 6th St., N. Humboldt, Iowa, United States
- Type: Free
- Established: 1909

Access and use
- Access requirements: Resident of Humboldt/Dakota City, otherwise local library card

Other information
- Director: Nikki Ehlers
- Website: Website
- Humboldt Free Public Library
- U.S. National Register of Historic Places
- Location within Iowa Location within the United States
- Coordinates: 42°43′18″N 94°12′59″W
- Built: 1908-1909
- Architect: Hallett & Rawson
- Architectural style: Late 19th and 20th century Revivals
- MPS: Public Library Buildings in Iowa TR
- NRHP reference No.: 83000368
- Added to NRHP: May 23, 1983

Humboldt Public Library in Humboldt, Iowa, USA, is a free public library. The library received a $10,000 grant from the Carnegie Corporation of New York on December 13, 1906. The Des Moines architectural firm of Hallett & Rawson designed the building. It was built using limestone from a nearby area now known as Taft Park. Construction began in 1908 and it was dedicated on February 9, 1909. The rough texture of the rock-faced stone and the portico columns in the Tuscan order give the building a rustic appearance. It was listed on the National Register of Historic Places in 1983. A north entrance and extension were added to the building in 1992.
