= College Corner Commercial Historic Business District =

Historic district in Iowa, United States

- U.S. National Register of Historic Places
- U.S. Historic district
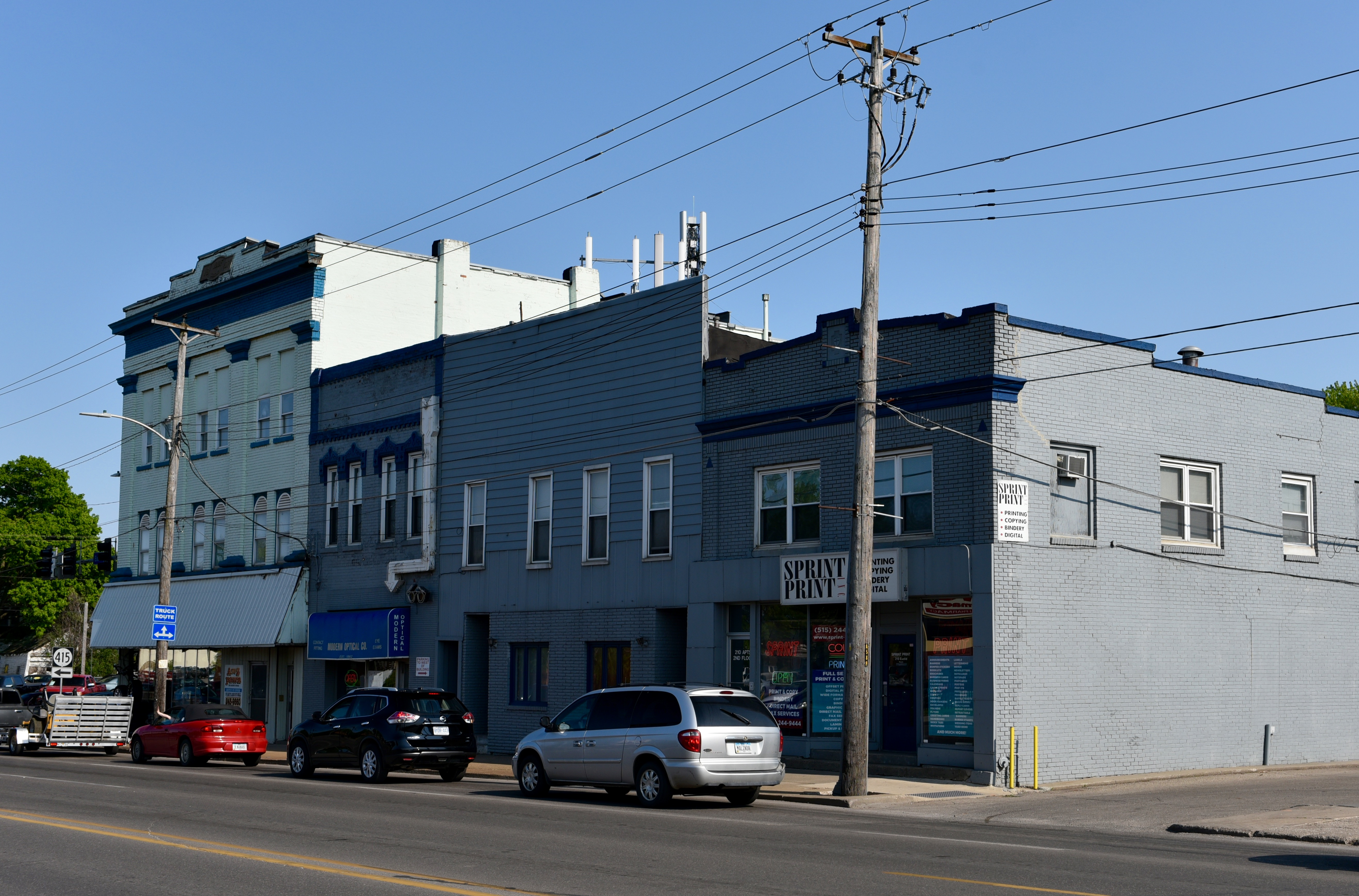

- Location within Iowa Location within the United States
- Location: Euclid Ave. between 2nd and 3rd Aves. Des Moines, Iowa
- Coordinates: 41°37′39″N 93°37′13″W
- Area: 2 acres (0.81 ha)
- Architect: Liebbe, Nourse & Rasmussen
- Architectural style: Late 19th and Early 20th Century American Movements
- NRHP reference No.: 98000385
- Added to NRHP: April 23, 1998

The College Corner Commercial Historic Business District, also known as the Highland Park Historic Business District at Euclid and Second, is located in the north-central section of Des Moines, Iowa, United States. It is located in the Highland Park neighborhood that also includes the Highland Park Historic Business District at Euclid and Sixth Avenues. The College Corner historic district has been listed on the National Register of Historic Places since 1998.

== History ==
The name for the district reflect its proximity to Highland Park College, which later became Des Moines University after a merger with Des Moines College. The college was founded in 1889 just after the Highland Park Land Company opened up this section of Des Moines for residential development. The College Corner commercial district was associated with the college's professors and students who in general lived nearby and patronized the establishments at the intersection of Second and Euclid Avenues. The establishments included a drug store, restaurants, cafes, a bookstore and a tea room. Until 1919 the post office went back and forth between this commercial district and the one at Sixth Avenue. An Odd Fellows hall was moved here in 1907. A bank opened in the district in the early 1950s.

The college was closed in 1929 and the business district continued to serve the residents of the neighborhood. The extension of the Second Avenue street car line in the early 20th century helped develop and sustain the neighborhood. In 1954 the college campus was sold to a developer who built Park Fair Shopping Center on the site. It was Iowa's first enclosed shopping center. To an extent it drew customers away from the older business district.

== Architecture ==
The College Corner Commercial Historic Business District is composed of seven buildings and an empty lot. One the buildings, the Odd Fellows Hall, is three stories in height and stands at the corner of Second and Euclid. At the time it was built it was the tallest building in Des Moines outside of the central business district. There are four two-story commercial buildings and two one-story buildings. The buildings are constructed of brick with the exception of the building at 208 Euclid, which is the oldest and the last two-story frame commercial building in the district. The structures in the historic district were built from the early 1890s through 1952.

The three buildings constructed in the 1890s are two-story brick buildings that feature bold cornice lines, segmental arched window hoods and narrow window openings. The storefronts on these buildings have a recessed entrance in the center, a square-cut transom above the door and large display windows on the sides. Two buildings were constructed in the first decade of the 20th century. Their features are simpler than the older buildings. Their main features are a parapet wall of corbelled brick, wider window openings and round arched window hoods. A very simple one-story building was built in the 1920s. It employed metal window frames and has a wider storefront. The last building was a single-story bank building completed in 1952 and is an example of utilitarian construction methods, which were adapted to deal with post-World War II building material shortages. It is also one of the first drive-in businesses in Des Moines.
