= Marsh–Place Building =

- U.S. National Register of Historic Places
- U.S. Historic district – Contributing property
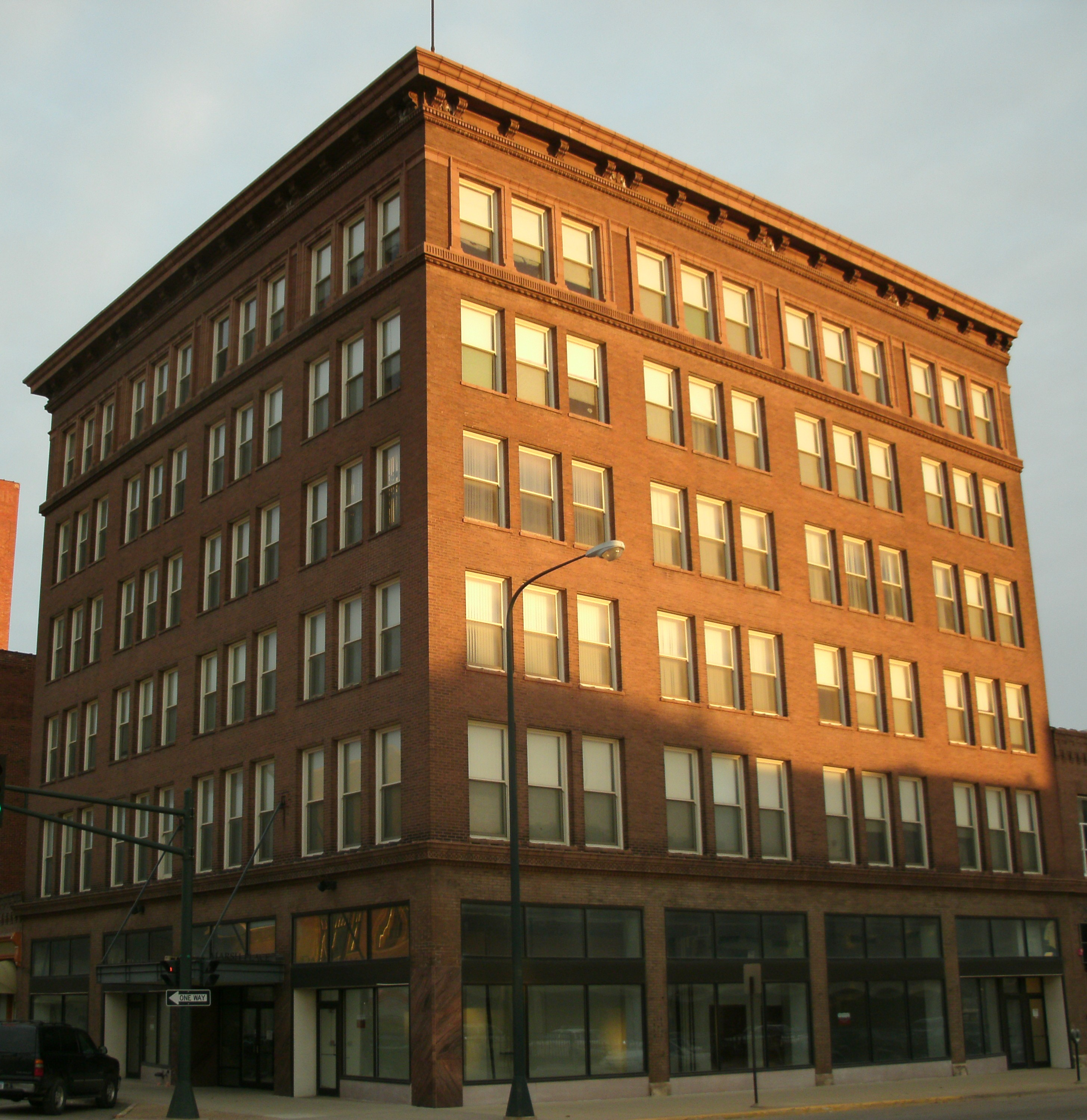

- Location within Iowa Location within the United States
- Location: 627 Sycamore St. Waterloo, Iowa
- Coordinates: 42°29′51″N 92°20′4″W
- Area: less than one acre
- Built: 1910
- Architect: Hallett & Rawson
- Architectural style: Early Commercial
- Part of: Waterloo East Commercial Historic District (ID11000813)
- NRHP reference No.: 98001272
- Added to NRHP: October 22, 1998

The Marsh–Place Building at 627 Sycamore St. in Waterloo, Iowa is a six-story building built in 1910. According to its nomination to the National Register of Historic Places, it is notable as "a distinctive, virtually unaltered example of the Commercial Style". And it is an "excellent" example of "the three-part base-shaft-capital approach (similar to a classical column) to tall building design."

It is a work of architects Hallett & Rawson. It was individually listed on the National Register of Historic Places in 1998. In 2011 it was included as a contributing property in the Waterloo East Commercial Historic District.
