= Hallett Flats–Rawson & Co. Apartment Building =

- U.S. National Register of Historic Places
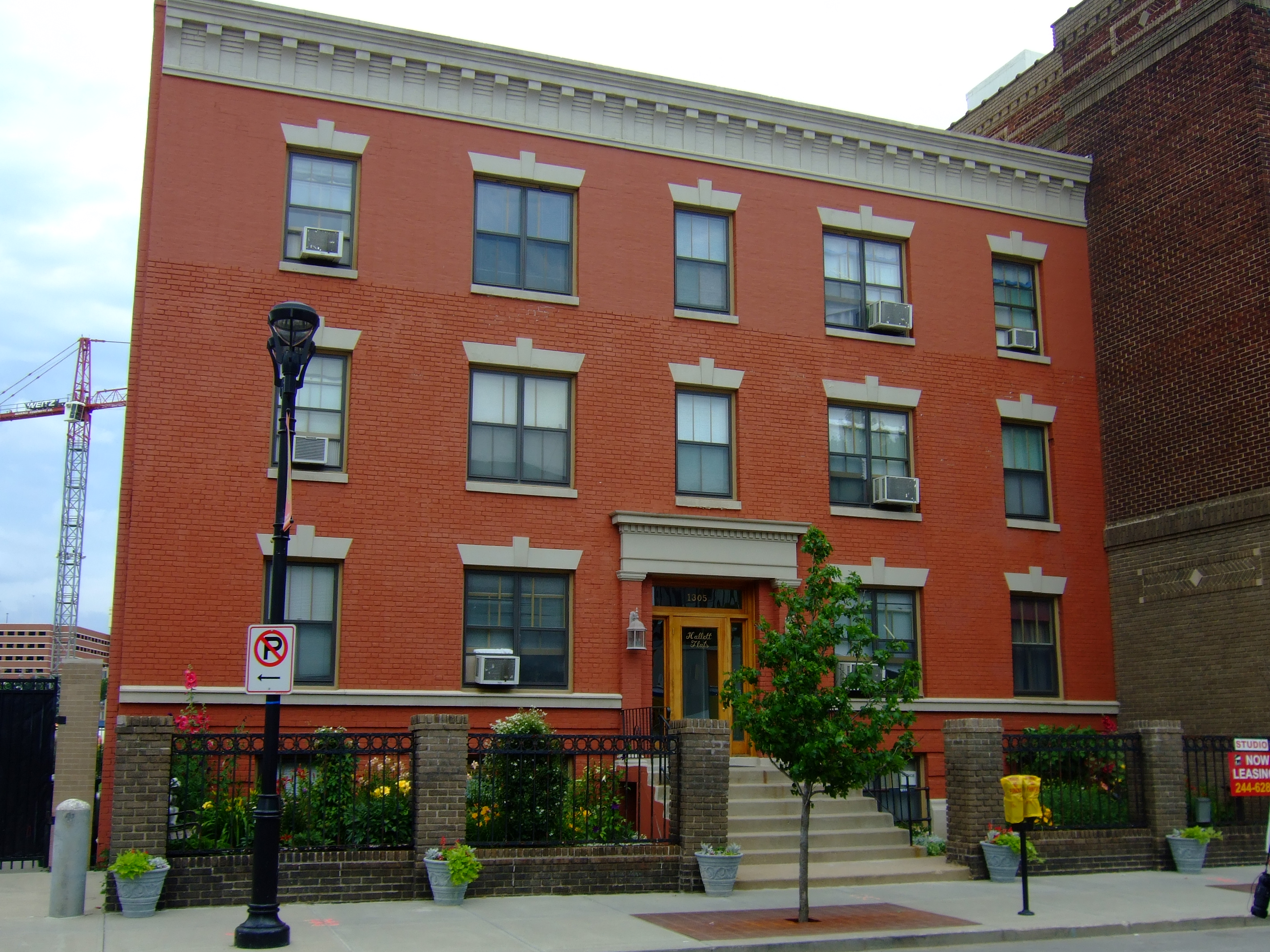
- Hallett Apartments part of the complex

- Location within Iowa Location within the United States
- Location: 1301-1307 Locust St. Des Moines, Iowa
- Coordinates: 41°35′6.4″N 93°38′2″W
- Area: less than one acre
- Built: 1904
- Architect: Hallett, George E.; Proudfoot, Bird and Rawson
- Architectural style: Colonial Revival, Chicago
- NRHP reference No.: 00001456
- Added to NRHP: December 1, 2000

The Hallett Flats–Rawson & Co. Apartment Building at 1301–1307 Locust St. in Des Moines, Iowa is a pair of abutting buildings. The Hallett Flats building, at 1305–1307 Locust St., is a three-story building designed by architect George E. Hallett and was built in 1904. It has also been known as Hallett Apartments. The Rawson & Co. Apartment Building, a four-story building designed by Proudfoot, Bird and Rawson, was built in 1915 in such a way that the two would function as one building. It has also been known as Arlington Apartments. The combination was listed on the National Register of Historic Places in 2000. The listing included two contributing buildings and one other contributing structure.

It was deemed architecturally significant "as a fine example of a multiple-function complex, designed during the early Twentieth Century by two of Des Moines' most prominent architectural firms."
