= Highland Park Historic Business District at Euclid and Sixth Avenues =

Historic district in Iowa, United States

- U.S. National Register of Historic Places
- U.S. Historic district
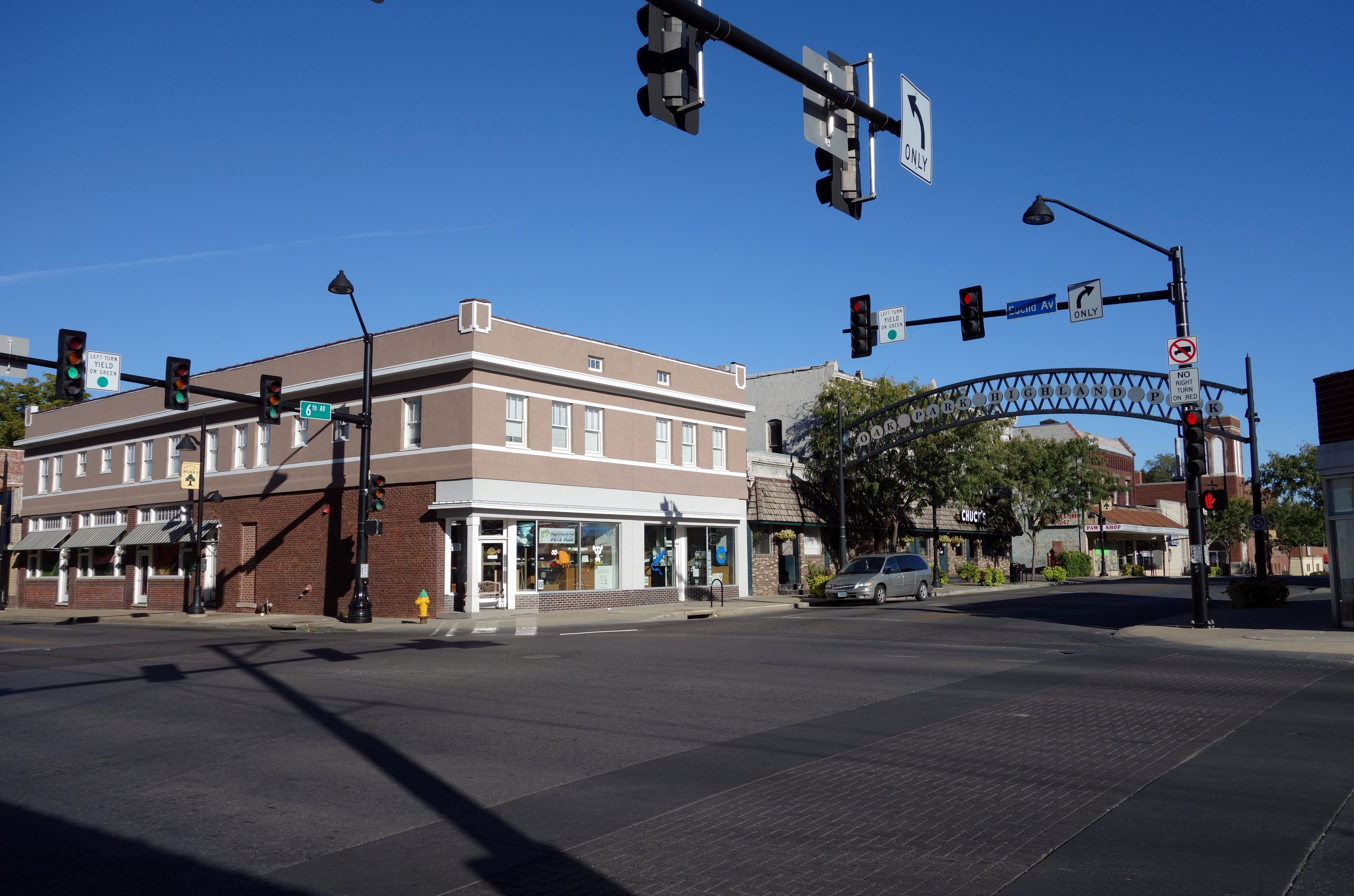

- Location within Iowa Location within the United States
- Location: Roughly the junction of Euclid and 6th Aves. Des Moines, Iowa
- Coordinates: 41°37′42″N 93°37′27″W
- Area: 6 acres (2.4 ha)
- Architect: Wetherell & Gage; Hallett & Rawson
- Architectural style: Late 19th and Early 20th Century American Movements
- NRHP reference No.: 98000867
- Added to NRHP: July 15, 1998

The Highland Park Historic Business District at Euclid and Sixth Avenues is located in the north-central section of Des Moines, Iowa, United States. It is located on the border of the Oak Park and Highland Park neighborhoods. The commercial historic district has been listed on the National Register of Historic Places since 1998. The Highland Park neighborhood also includes the College Corner Commercial Historic Business District.

== History ==
Des Moines was growing in a northward direction in the late 19th century with the establishment of the city of North Des Moines. Developers extended that growth in the late 1880s by developing Oak Park and Highland Park across the Des Moines River. They built a bridge at Sixth Avenue, a zoo on the river lowlands and Highland Park College, a non-denominational institution. They also lobbied to have a streetcar built to their development. The river bridge made Sixth Avenue a major farm-to-city road when there were few bridges over the Des Moines River north of the city. The business district itself has the appearance of the downtown of a modest-sized Iowa town. It had banks, fraternal halls, a fire station, post office, local newspapers, department stores, a variety of retail stores as well as other businesses. Most of the business lived a rather short life, but a few lasted for a couple of generations. The first bank in Des Moines outside of downtown was located here. A streetcar line served the district and it was on a major farm-to-city road.

The historic district lies along Sixth Avenue, which is the north–south border of the Highland Park and Oak Park neighborhoods. Both neighborhoods are located on a plateau three miles north of downtown Des Moines. It is considered one of the highest spots in the city. “Highland Park” was chosen for the name of the historic district because it became the more dominant of the two neighborhoods starting in the early 20th century. From its very beginning the business district was organized under the title of Highland Park Business Men's Club. Most of the buildings in the historic district cluster at the intersection with Euclid Avenue. Only six of the properties are not oriented in some way on Sixth Avenue, which is the primary street in the district. All the buildings are brick commercial structures that were built from the early 1890s to just after World War II. The buildings built from the 1920s on were, for the most part, built along Euclid Avenue. Euclid was transformed from a residential street into a state highway at this time.

Highland Park is the largest neighborhood-centered commercial district in the Des Moines area. The district remains largely intact with only a few lots that are vacant. Two of the lots were the location of large frame commercial buildings, which had to be replaced. One lot is vacant while the other is occupied by an infill building.

== Architecture ==
The buildings in the historic district fall into three classifications. The older buildings, which were built between the early 1890s and 1907, are first generation brick buildings in the High Victorian style. They tend toward exaggerated ornamentation on the façade. The windows are narrower and feature window surrounds, narrow storefronts and either cast iron or stone storefront supports. The last buildings in this group replaced older structures that were destroyed in a fire in 1906. It was the only major fire in the district. Corbelled brickwork replaced the tin work, stone and terra cotta of the older buildings.

The second group of buildings was built between 1915 and the mid-1920s. The automobile was growing in importance and these buildings reflect that development. The design flow of the buildings is more horizontal and the window openings are broader and simpler. The decorative elements were constructed with stone or concrete inserts and string courses.

The last group was built in the late 1920s to the years right after World War II. The architecture is a continence of the second group and was influenced by the Modern architectural style. Ornamental materials utilized in the construction include glazed tile, Carrara glass, aluminum, and steel. The buildings in this latter group are all one-story, but one.
