= Hallett & Rawson =

Architectural partnership

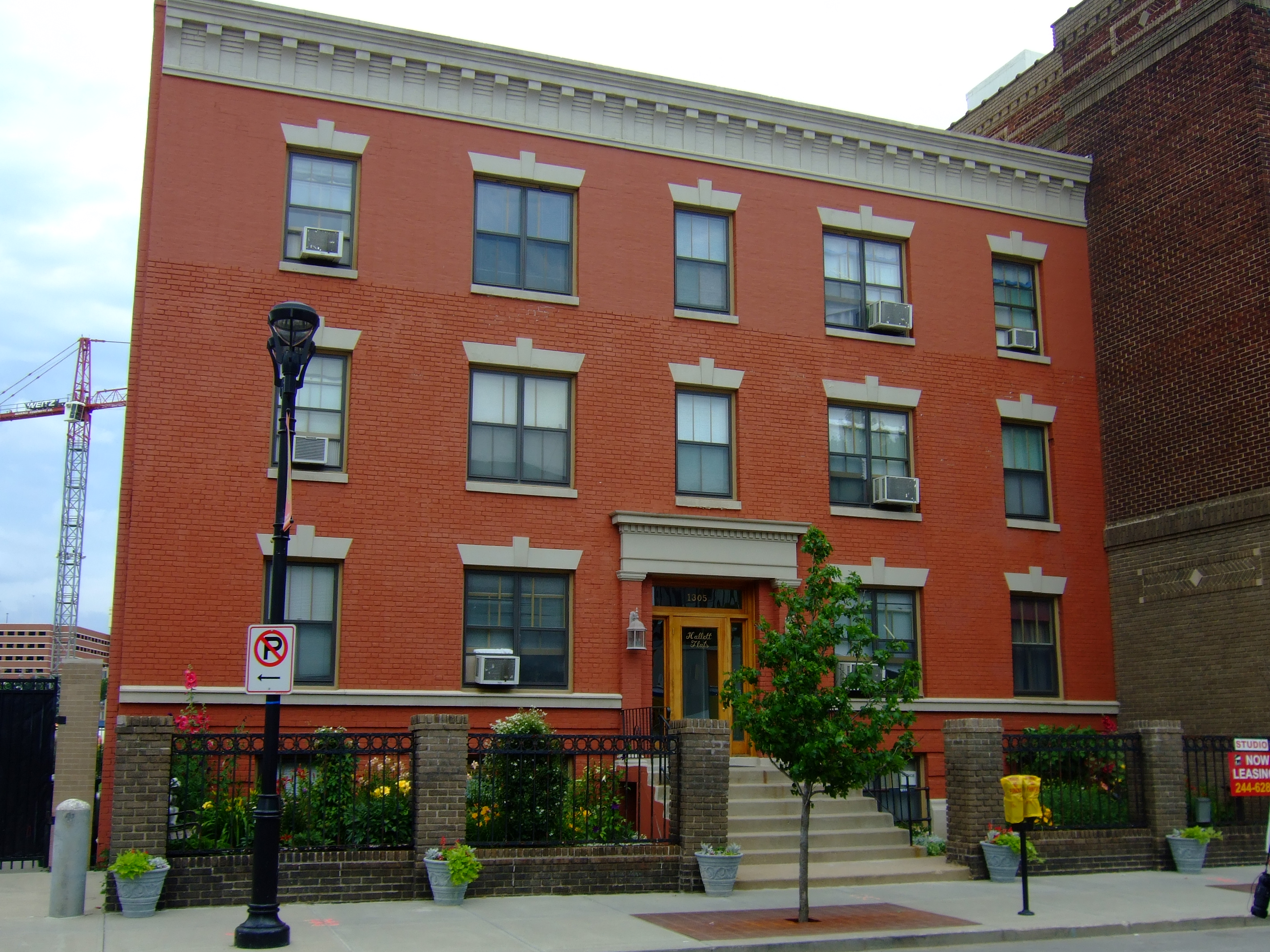
Hallett Flat-Rawson & Co. Apartment Building, Des Moines, Iowa

Hallett & Rawson was an architectural partnership in Iowa. George E. Hallett and Harry Rawson were partners. BBS Architects | Engineers is the continuing, successor firm; its archives hold plans of the original Hallett & Rawson firm. Works by the individual architects and the firm include a number that are listed on the National Register of Historic Places.

Around the turn of the 20th century, George E. Hallett designed a number of small houses in the former North Des Moines area which employed elements of American Movements architecture / American Craftsman architecture. His were nicer than most small houses for the quality of their design and their interior amenities. His included a fireplace, in particular, which was rare in small houses. National Register of Historic Places' documentation of one of the homes describes an 1897 newspaper feature article which "documented Hallett's role as a real estate developer and included an architectural drawing of the buildings signed 'Geo. E. Hallett architect' This article also contains a brief description of the interior of these homes:

The average cost of each home will be about $2,500. The houses will all be finished in the most modern style, with beamed ceilings and large, brick fire places. The designs and interiors are original with Mr. Hallett (Des Moines Leader 1897:19)

These include:

- Julius Scheibe Cottage, 815 College Avenue, Des Moines, Iowa, (1898) NRHP-listed
- N. S. Wales House, 1814 West 9th Street, Des Moines
- House at 1530 West 9th Street, Des Moines
- House at 1534 West 9th Street, Des Moines
- House at 1532 West 9th Street, Des Moines (no longer extant).
- House at 1530 West 9th Street, Des Moines, Hallett's own house (no longer extant) (c. 1897).
- Iowa State Senator C. J. A. Ericson House (c. 1896), in Boone, Iowa, "modern colonial"

The above cut shows a residence that is soon to be built in Boone, by [Iowa State] Senator C. J. A. Ericson. In style it will be modern colonial, or an adaptation of the best of the old and the best of the new styles and arrangement. It is to have a large hall through the middle of the house, with ten rooms in all; a comfortable old-fashioned fireplace in the sitting room, and other fireplaces in other rooms, imposing stationary book cases, an elaborate sideboard at the end of the dining room, beautiful art windows, and other features that will make it one of the finest residences of moderate cost in Iowa. That cost will be about $8,000. Mr. Geo. E. Hallett, of this city, is the designer and architect. (Des Moines Saturday Review 1896:1)

Other works include (with attribution):

- Hallett Flat-Rawson & Co. Apartment Building, 1301-1307 Locust Street, Des Moines, Iowa (Hallett, George E.; Proudfoot, Bird and Rawson), NRHP-listed
- One or more works in Highland Park Historic Business District at Euclid and Sixth Avenues, located roughly at the junction of Euclid and Sixth Avenues, Des Moines, Iowa (Hallett & Rawson), NRHP-listed
- Humboldt Free Public Library, 30 6th Street North, Humboldt, Iowa (Hallett & Rawson), NRHP-listed
- Marsh-Place Building, 627 Sycamore Street, Waterloo, Iowa (Hallett & Rawson), NRHP-listed
- W.A. McNeill House, 1282 C Ave. East, Oskaloosa, Iowa (Hallett & Rawson), NRHP-listed
- Rumely-Des Moines Drug Company Building, 110 SW. Fourth Street, Des Moines, Iowa (Hallett & Rawson), NRHP-listed
- One or more works in West Ninth Streetcar Line Historic District, West Ninth Street from University Avenue to Hickman Road, Des Moines, Iowa (Hallett & Rawson), NRHP-listed
- One or more works in the Grinnell Historic Commercial District, Roughly bounded by Main, Broad, and Commercial Sts. and 5th Ave., Grinnell, Iowa (Hallett & Rawson), NRHP-listed
- One or more works in the Waterloo East Commercial Historic District, Waterloo, Iowa
- Princess Theater, 314 4th Street, Des Moines, Iowa
- Building 1, 403 W 4th St N, Newton, Iowa

== See also ==
- Proudfoot & Bird, in which Harry Dustan Rawson (1872-1934) was a partner.
