= Ericson Public Library =

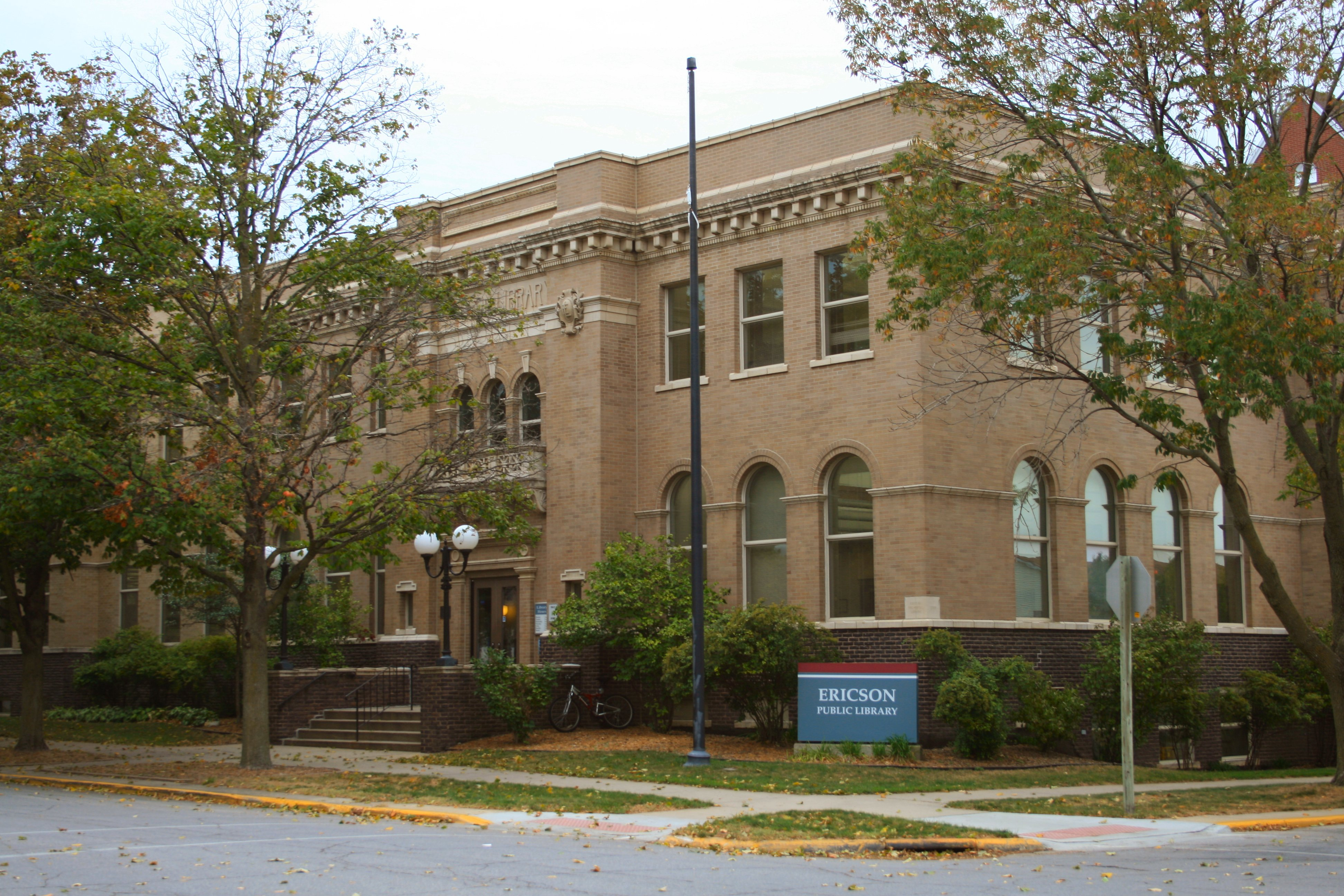
- Location: 702 Greene St. Boone, Iowa, United States
- Type: Public
- Architect: Liebbe

Other information
- Director: Jamie Williams
- Website: www.boone.lib.ia.us
- Ericson Public Library
- U.S. National Register of Historic Places
- Location within Iowa Location within the United States
- Coordinates: 42°03′47″N 93°52′58″W
- Area: Less than one acre
- Built: 1900-1901
- Architect: Liebbe, Nourse & Rasmussen
- Architectural style: Renaissance Revival
- MPS: Public Library Buildings in Iowa TR
- NRHP reference No.: 83000344
- Added to NRHP: May 23, 1983

Ericson Public Library is located in Boone, Iowa, United States. The public library building was a gift of C.J.A. Ericson, a local businessman and politician, who served five terms in the Iowa General Assembly. While in the state legislature he advocated for libraries on a statewide level. He was also a longtime member of the Iowa Library Association.

The building was designed in the Renaissance Revival style by the Des Moines architectural firm of Liebbe, Nourse & Rasmussen. It was completed in 1901, and features a projecting central pavilion with a Venetian window-piece above the main entrance. An addition was built onto the rear of the building from 1922 to 1923. The building was listed on the National Register of Historic Places in 1983.
