= Guglielmo Pugi =

Italian sculptor

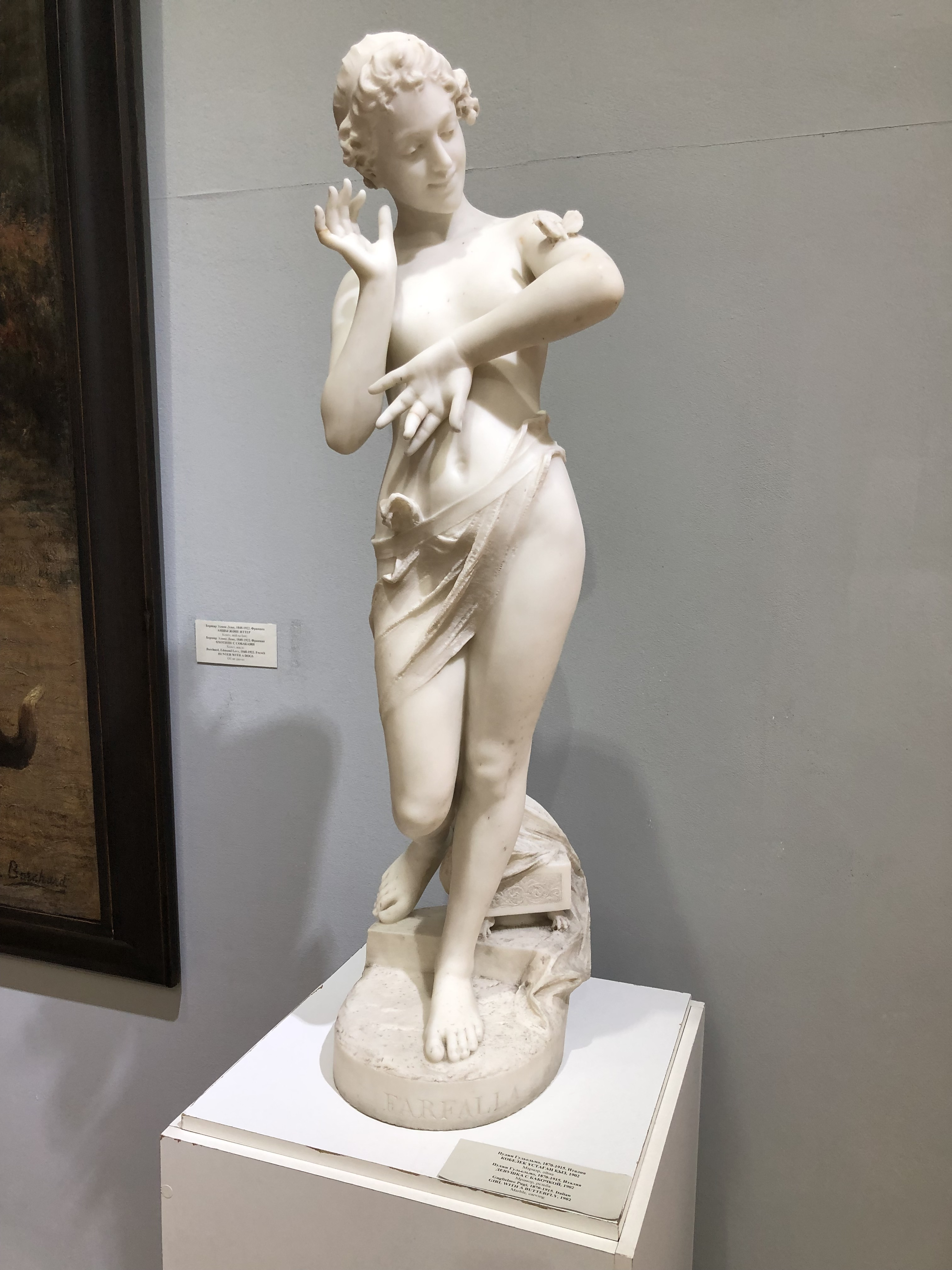
Girl with a butterfly by Guglielmo Pugi (1902)

Guglielmo Pugi (1850-1915), born in Fiesole, Italy, was an Italian sculptor whose studio was in Florence. He and his sons, Gino and Fiorenzo, functioned as Guglielmo Pugi and Sons, and the sons later operated as Fratelli G. and F. Pugi (also known as Pugi Brothers).

They primarily served the export market.

They were present at the 1901 World Fair in Buffalo and some of their sculptures are still in Buffalo parks today. Example works ("Statues, busts, and groups in marble") by G. and F. Pugi Brothers were displayed in the Palace of Manufactures in the 1904 St. Louis World's Fair.
