= Veneman's Bungalow Court Historic District =

Historic district in Iowa, United States

- U.S. National Register of Historic Places
- U.S. Historic district
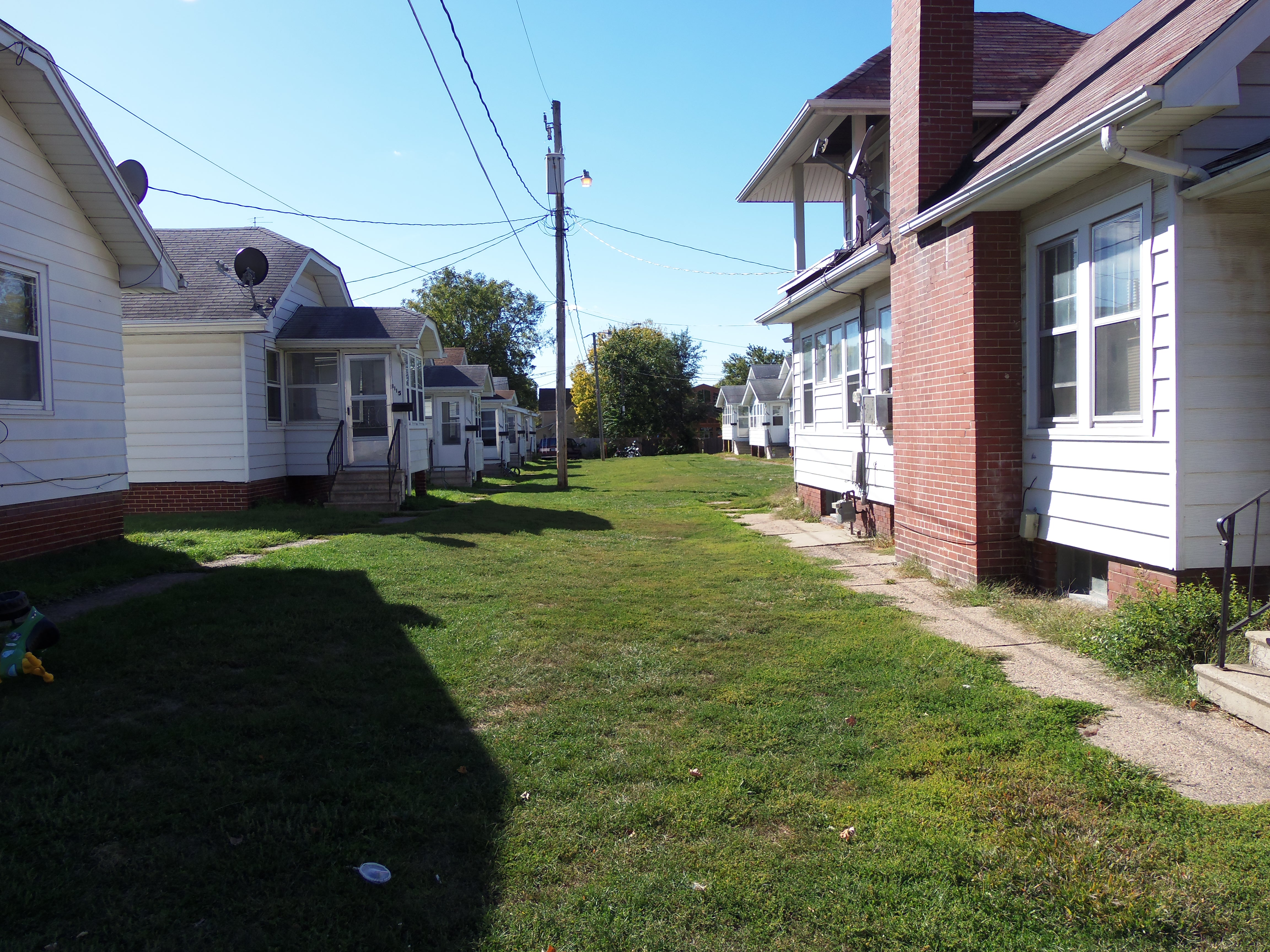

- Location within Iowa Location within the United States
- Location: 1101-115 Droukas Court and 1228 and 1232 E. 12th St. Des Moines, Iowa
- Coordinates: 41°36′03″N 93°36′25″W
- Area: Less than one acre
- Built by: Vernon and Eva Veneman
- Architectural style: Bungalow; American Craftsman
- MPS: The Bungalow and Square House Des Moines Residential Growth And Development, 1900-1942
- NRHP reference No.: 00000929
- Added to NRHP: November 21, 2000

The Veneman's Bungalow Court Historic District, also known as Droukas Court, is located in Des Moines, Iowa, United States. It is the only example of a Post World War I “California bungalow court” in the city. The district has been listed on the National Register of Historic Places since 2000. It is part of The Bungalow and Square House Des Moines Residential Growth And Development, 1900-1942 MPS.

== History ==
The eleven houses in Droukas Court were built between 1924 and 1926. It is one of three "California bungalow court” developments in Des Moines. The other two examples are the Lincoln Court and Goddard Bungalow Court Historic District. They were both built in 1916. Droukas Court was a late example of a bungalow development and the only post-World War I example. It was successful as a rental complex as it was built near a street car line. Unlike the Godard, Droukas Court was built after the automobile became popular and nearby off-site parking garages were built for the tenants.

John B. Veneman acquired the property in two parcels in February 1909 from John H. Cash and W. R. Mathews. The odd numbered bungalows on the southern portion of the district were constructed after the building permits were issued on September 23, 1924 to Ringland Veneman. The even-numbered houses on the north side of the district were built after the building permits were issued on March 19, 1926 to V. V. Veneman. The houses on the south have a more varied porch treatment, which suggests that there was interest in visual variety that faded by the time the houses on the northern were built.

The development was initially known as Veneman Court until 1954 when it was sold to Dan and Georgia Droukas and renamed Droukas Court. It has been known by that name ever since. They sold it to Gene Andrews and Jess Comley who in turn sold it to George and Bertha Archer. Renters over the years have been either families or elderly tenants. In more recent years tenants have qualified for low rent housing.
