= Goddard Bungalow Court Historic District =

Historic district in Iowa, United States

- U.S. National Register of Historic Places
- U.S. Historic district
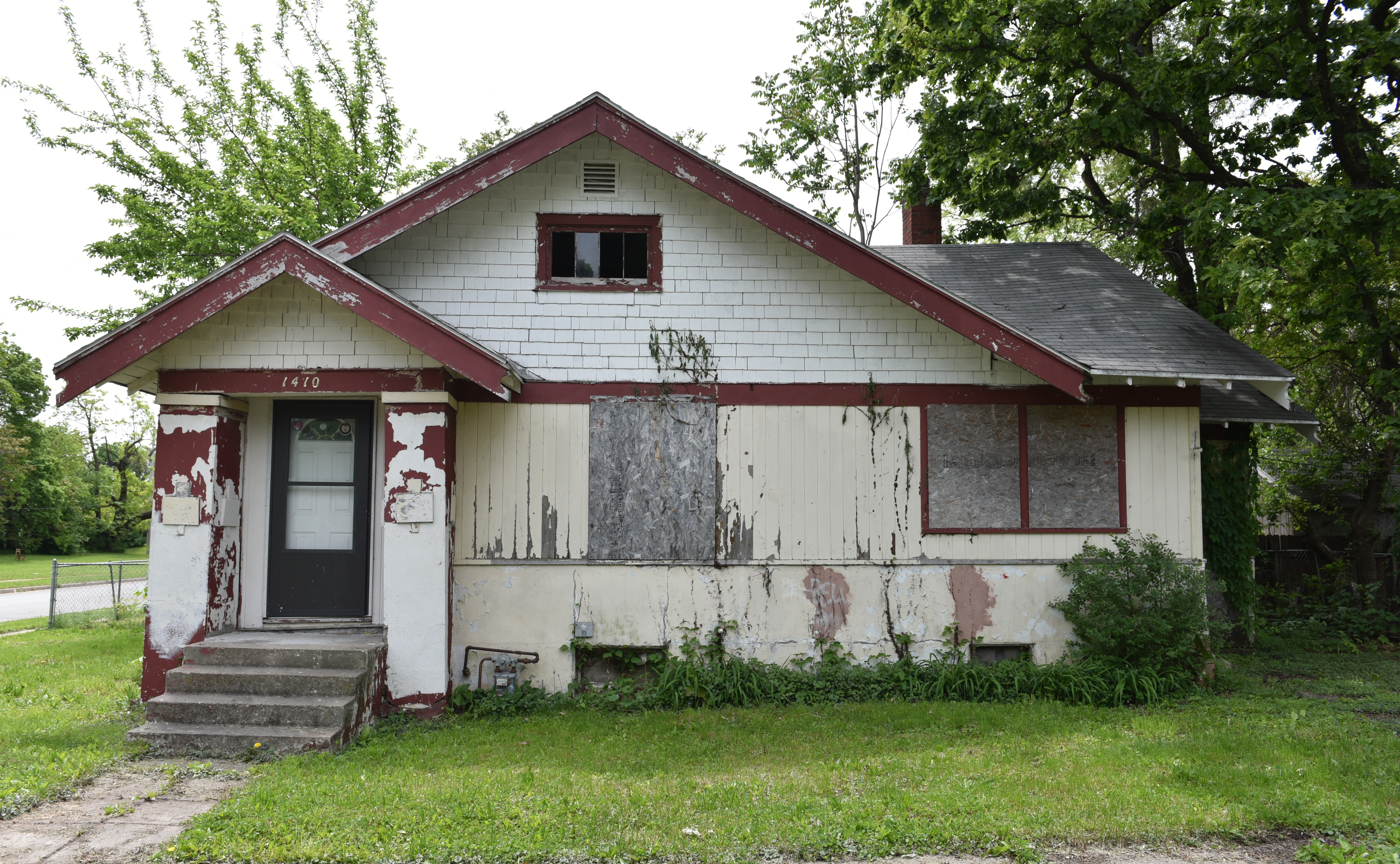
- 1410 Goddard Court

- Location within Iowa Location within the United States
- Location: 1410-21 Goddard Court and 1232 14th St. Des Moines, Iowa
- Coordinates: 41°36′5″N 93°38′9″W
- Area: 1.67 acres (0.68 ha)
- Built: 1916
- Architectural style: Bungalow; American Craftsman
- MPS: The Bungalow and Square House--Des Moines Residential Growth and Development MPS
- NRHP reference No.: 00000930
- Added to NRHP: November 21, 2000

The Goddard Bungalow Court Historic District is located in Des Moines, Iowa, United States. It has been listed on the National Register of Historic Places since 2000.

== History ==
The houses on Goddard Court were built in 1916. It is one of three "California bungalow court” developments in Des Moines. The other two are Lincoln Court, also built in 1916 and the Veneman's Bungalow Court Historic District, built from 1924 to 1926. Goddard Court was built just after the first such concept developed. When the court was built it consisted of eleven bungalows and one cottage that was already in existence. The cottage does not contribute to the historic nature of the district. They were built around a cul-de-sac that exited east onto 14th Street. No garages or driveways were part of the original concept, and today only four garages have been built in the years since. One of the bungalows was torn down in 1993 and the empty lot remains.

== Architecture ==
There is a conscious arrangement to the bungalows in the district. The houses feature a double gable on the main façade of the structure. Each house has a mirror image twin that is positioned opposite or diagonal from it. Lot sizes and shape vary depending on where it is located on the cul-de-sac. The lot widths are between 40 and 45 feet, and lengths are between 70 and 147 feet. The bungalows feature frame structures built on brick foundations. The interiors contain five rooms, which includes two bedrooms.
