= Ingersoll Place Plat Historic District =

Historic district in Iowa, United States

- U.S. National Register of Historic Places
- U.S. Historic district
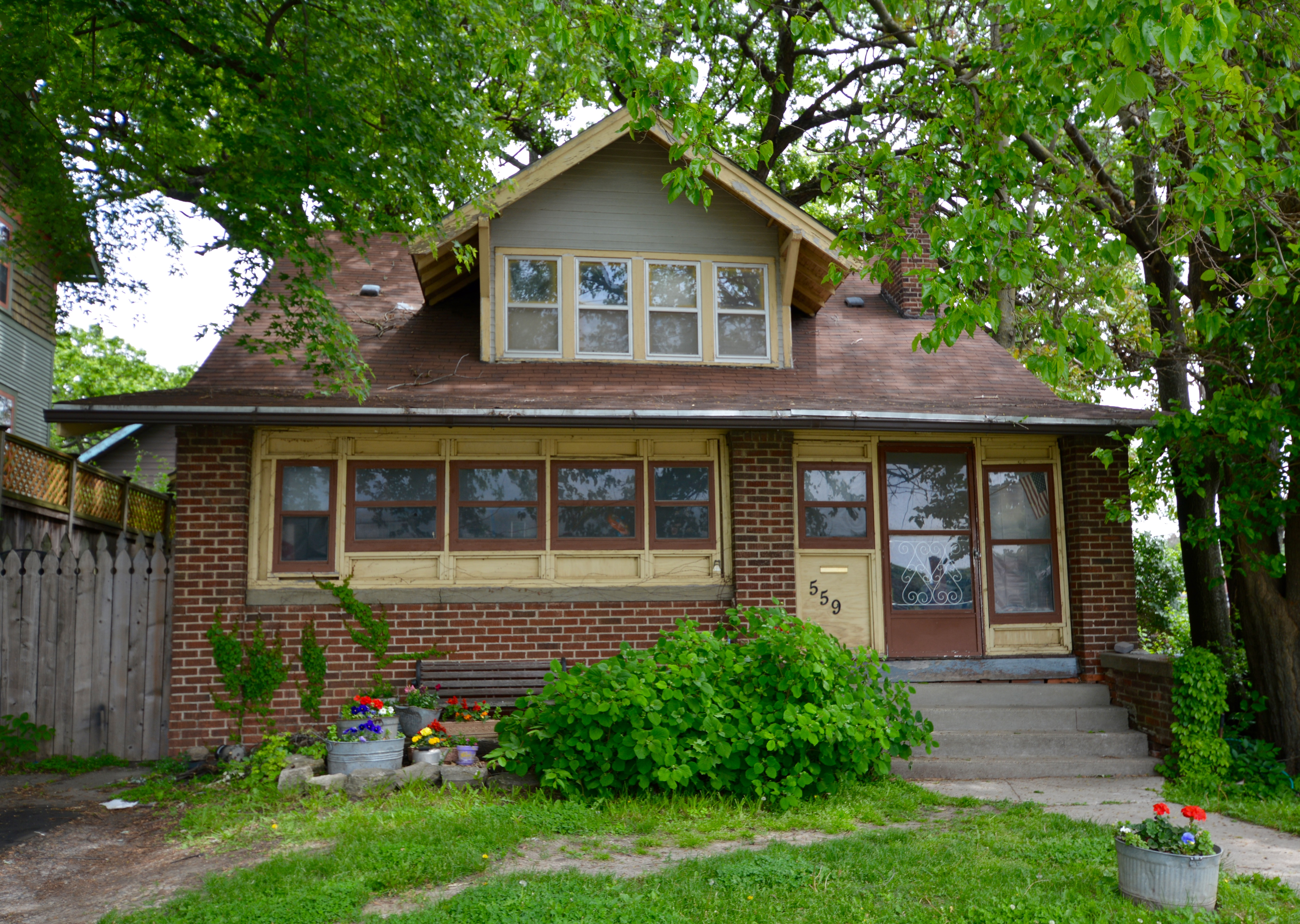
- 559 28th Street

- Location within Iowa Location within the United States
- Location: 28th, Linden, and High Sts., Des Moines, Iowa
- Coordinates: 41°35′14″N 93°39′11″W
- Area: 7.76 acres (3.14 ha)
- Architect: Charles Dombach
- Architectural style: Colonial Revival
- NRHP reference No.: 00000931
- Added to NRHP: November 21, 2000

The Ingersoll Place Plat Historic District is located in Des Moines, Iowa, United States. It has been listed on the National Register of Historic Places since 2000. The historic significance of the district is based on the concentration of bungalows and square houses as well as a mix of subtypes.

== History ==
The Des Moines Life Insurance Company officially created the Ingersoll Place Plat on September 27, 1906. At the same time the Ingersoll Run sewer line was put under contract. The 21,460 feet (6,541 m) of main sewer line brought sewer service to the northwest side of Des Moines. Early residential development began near Ingersoll Park, an amusement park that was located at 42nd Street and Ingersoll until 1911. Housing construction then moved east from there, which is contrary to the city's general east to west movement of development. Ingersoll Avenue also had a streetcar line since 1897, which made the area attractive for development. The Financial Panic of 1905–1906, however, delayed construction. Fifty of the lots were foreclosed on and had to be resold.

== Architecture ==
A majority of the houses in the district, twenty-four, are square house plans. Front gabled houses number thirteen, eight have hipped roofs and three have side gables. The houses with hip roofs are found in the east end and the front-gables houses are found in the west.

The district has five bungalows with front gables; all but one is on Linden Street. Two houses are part of a subtype of bungalows with a hip roof and two have a double gable on the front of the house. Two more houses follow the subtype of a gable front with a gabled side porch.

Five more bungalows have side gables. Three are on Linden Street, and there is one each on High and 28th Streets. Three houses feature a subtype of this style has a single roof pitch and full-width front porch. Two more houses have a single roof pitch, offset with a less than full-width front porch. There is also one house that has a double main roof pitch. It also has a combination of American Craftsman and Classical Revival ornamentation.

Seven houses are neither bungalows nor square houses. Two houses are a vernacular side gable, story-and-a-half, square house that is popular in Des Moines. Two houses were built in the Colonial Revival style, and one each were built in the Neoclassical and Prairie School styles. One house on High Street is a large two-story double-square plan with a hipped roof that defies classification. There are thirteen detached garages that are also contributing properties.

== Contributing Property ==
- Mahnke House
