= Mahnke House =

Historic house in Iowa, United States

- U.S. National Register of Historic Places
- U.S. Historic district – Contributing property
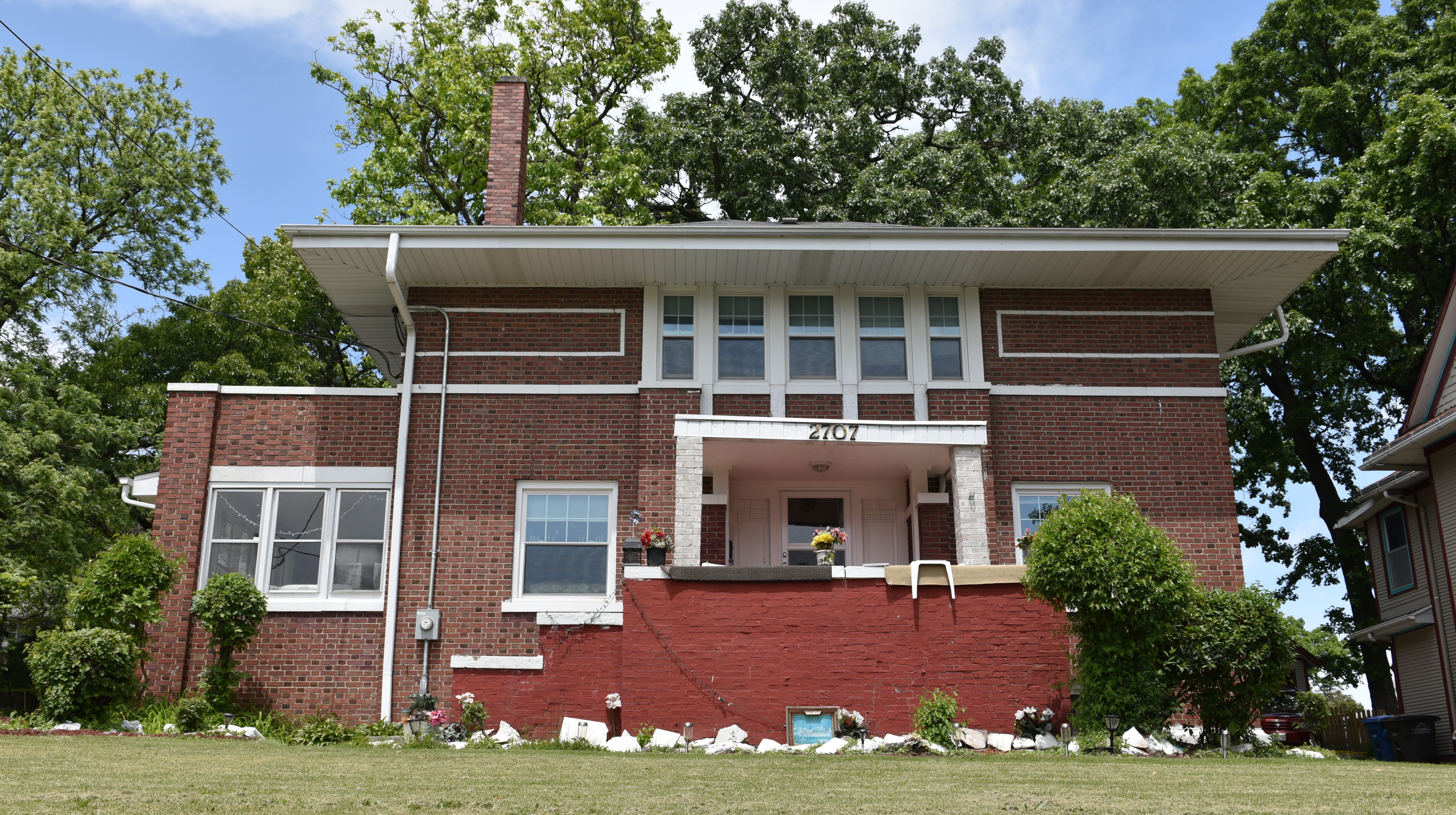

- Location within Iowa Location within the United States
- Location: 2707 High St. Des Moines, Iowa
- Coordinates: 41°35′14.4″N 93°39′12.4″W
- Built: 1909
- Built by: Fred W. Weitz
- Architectural style: Prairie School
- Part of: Ingersoll Place Plat Historic District (ID00000931)
- NRHP reference No.: 83003622
- Added to NRHP: October 13, 1983

The Mahnke House is an historical residential building located in Des Moines, Iowa, United States. The house was built by prolific Des Moines builder Fred W. Weitz in 1909 in the Prairie School style. The exterior is covered in Flemish bond brick veneer. It features a hip roof, a single-story west side solarium, a rear porch and a flat-roofed centered front portico with a raised entrance and square paned window lights. George and Emma Mahnke owned the house between 1909 and 1952 when they transferred the property to the Des Moines Annual Conference of the Methodist Church. The house then became the residence of the organization's superintendents. It was individually listed on the National Register of Historic Places in 1983, and it was included as a contributing property in the Ingersoll Place Plat Historic District in 2000.
