= Methodist Deaconess Institute—Esther Hall =

- U.S. National Register of Historic Places
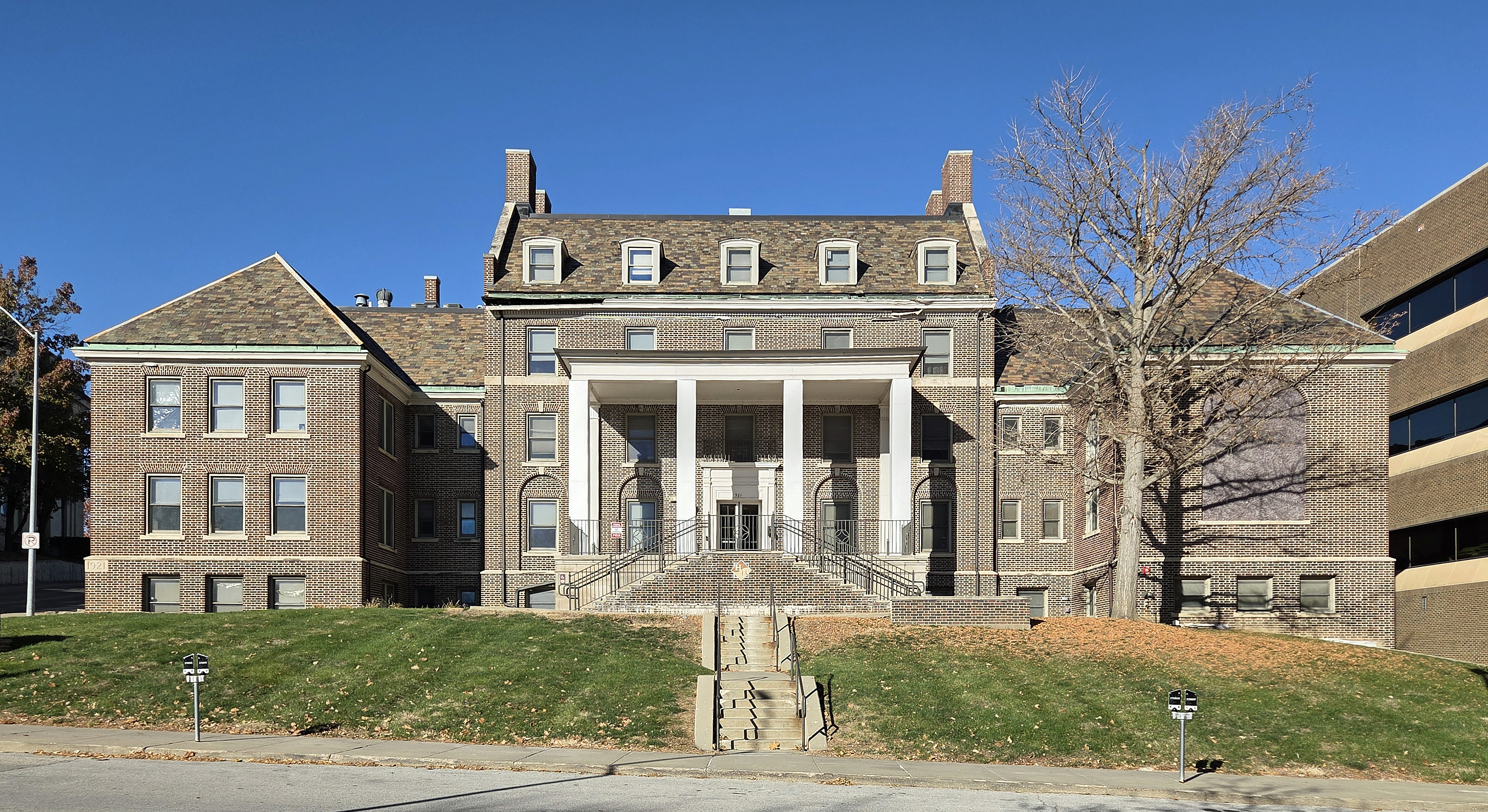
- The Methodist Deaconess Institute from the south

- Location within Iowa Location within the United States
- Location: 921 Pleasant Street, Des Moines, Iowa
- Coordinates: 41°35′20.9″N 93°37′49.8″W
- Area: less than one acre
- Built: 1922
- Built by: Arthur Neumann and Sons
- Architect: Proudfoot, Bird and Rawson
- Architectural style: Colonial Revival
- NRHP reference No.: 09000067
- Added to NRHP: March 4, 2009

The Methodist Deaconess Institute—Esther Hall, also known as Hawthorn Hill Apartments, is a historic building in Des Moines, Iowa, United States. This building has been known by a variety of titles. They include the Bible Training School, Women's Foreign Missionary Society; Women's Home Missionary Society-Bible Training School; Iowa National Bible Training School; Iowa National Esther Hall & Bidwell Deaconess Home; Hawthorn Hill; and Chestnut Hill. The Women's Home Missionary Society of the Methodist Episcopal Church established a Des Moines affiliate in 1896. Part of their responsibilities was to oversee the work of deaconesses of the church. At about the same time a Bible training school was established at Iowa Methodist Hospital's School of Nursing.

This building was constructed in 1922 to house those programs, which trained Methodist women as social workers, missionaries, and deaconesses. It contained dormitories, lecture, science and recreation rooms, and a chapel. Its function expanded in 1925 as a residence for young career women. The Bible training program was phased out during the Great Depression. The facility became co-ed in 1974 and closed in 1976. It reopened in 1978 before housing a multi-ministry human service agency. It ceased as a residential facility in 1995. In 2008 it became a low- and moderate-income apartment building. The building was listed on the National Register of Historic Places in 2009.

The brick Colonial Revival structure was designed by the prominent Des Moines architectural firm of Proudfoot, Bird and Rawson, and it was built by Arthur Neumann and Sons. The 3½-story main block is flanked by two-story wings that forms an "H". A two-story addition was built onto the east wing sometime before 1941. Both the main block and the wings were built over a raised basement. The roof on the west wings is gabled on the north end and hipped on the south, while the east wing has a hip roof. The main block features gabled ends and a two-story front porch that features classical columns and a shed roof. A single-story addition from 1959 has been removed.
