= Walnut Tire and Battery Co.-Globe Publishing Company Building =

- Walnut Tire and Battery Co.- Globe Publishing Company Building
- U.S. National Register of Historic Places
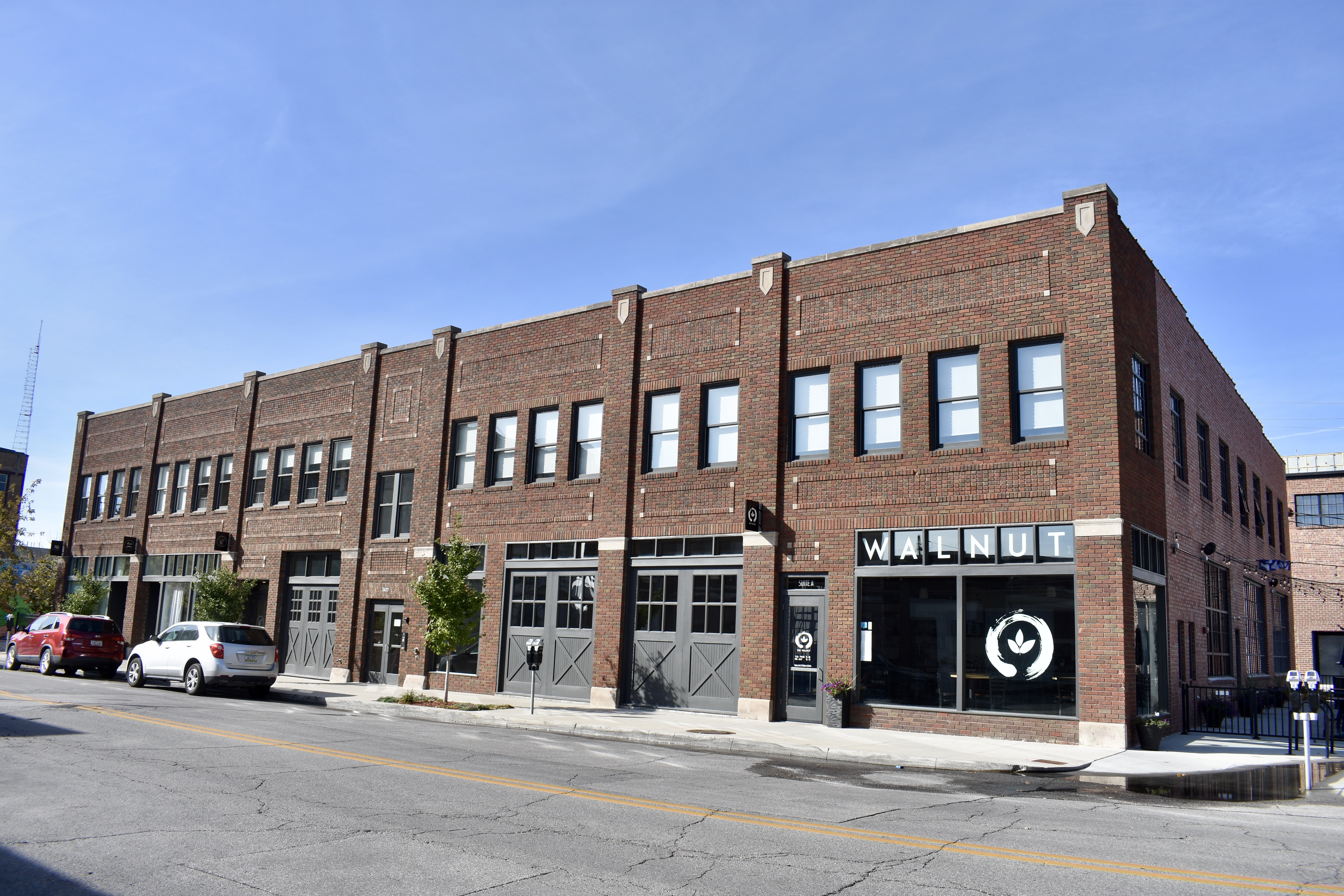

- Location within Iowa Location within the United States
- Location: 1417-1425 Walnut St. Des Moines, Iowa
- Coordinates: 41°35′01.9″N 93°38′8″W
- Area: less than one acre
- Built: 1924, 1928
- Architectural style: Late Gothic Revival
- NRHP reference No.: 100000489
- Added to NRHP: January 17, 2017

The Walnut Tire and Battery Co. Globe Publishing Company Building is a historic building located on the west side of downtown Des Moines, Iowa, United States. The two-story brick commercial building features two mirror-image sections that were completed four years apart. The western section of the Late Gothic Revival structure was completed in 1924 and the eastern section in 1928. Between the two sections is an interior staircase and a lightwell. The building is located on Des Moines' historic Auto Row, and it housed automobile-related businesses. Walnut Tire and Battery Co. built the original section for their own use and to rent space to tenants. They built the second section to increase the tenant space. The building was listed on the National Register of Historic Places in 2017.
