= Mack-International Motor Truck Corporation Building =

- U.S. National Register of Historic Places
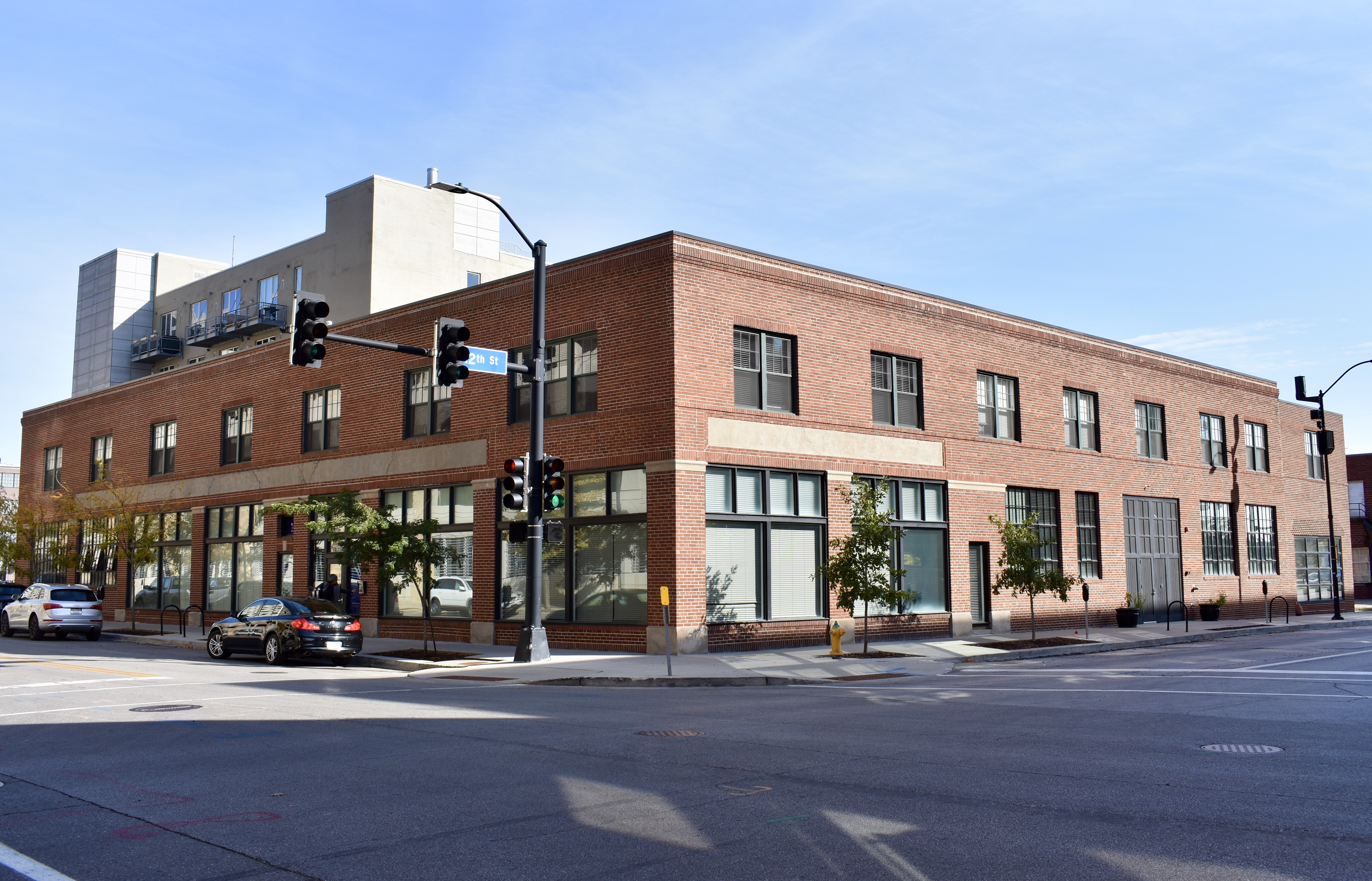

- Location within Iowa Location within the United States
- Location: 121 12th St. Des Moines, Iowa
- Coordinates: 41°34′59.5″N 93°37′52.2″W
- Area: less than one acre
- Built: 1924
- Built by: J.E. Lovejoy
- NRHP reference No.: 100000488
- Added to NRHP: January 17, 2017

The Mack-International Motor Truck Corporation Building is a historic building located in Des Moines, Iowa, United States. It was built by master builder and general contractor J.E. Lovejoy, who was also its original owner. Lovejoy and other tenants had offices on the second floor, while Mack Trucks occupied the ground floor. The front was used to showcase trucks and an industrial service space was in the back of the building. The two-story brick structure grew to take up a full quarter block after annexes were built in about 1931 and 1940. Located in Des Moines' historic Auto Row, the building was listed on the National Register of Historic Places in 2017.
