= Hubbell Warehouse =

- U.S. National Register of Historic Places
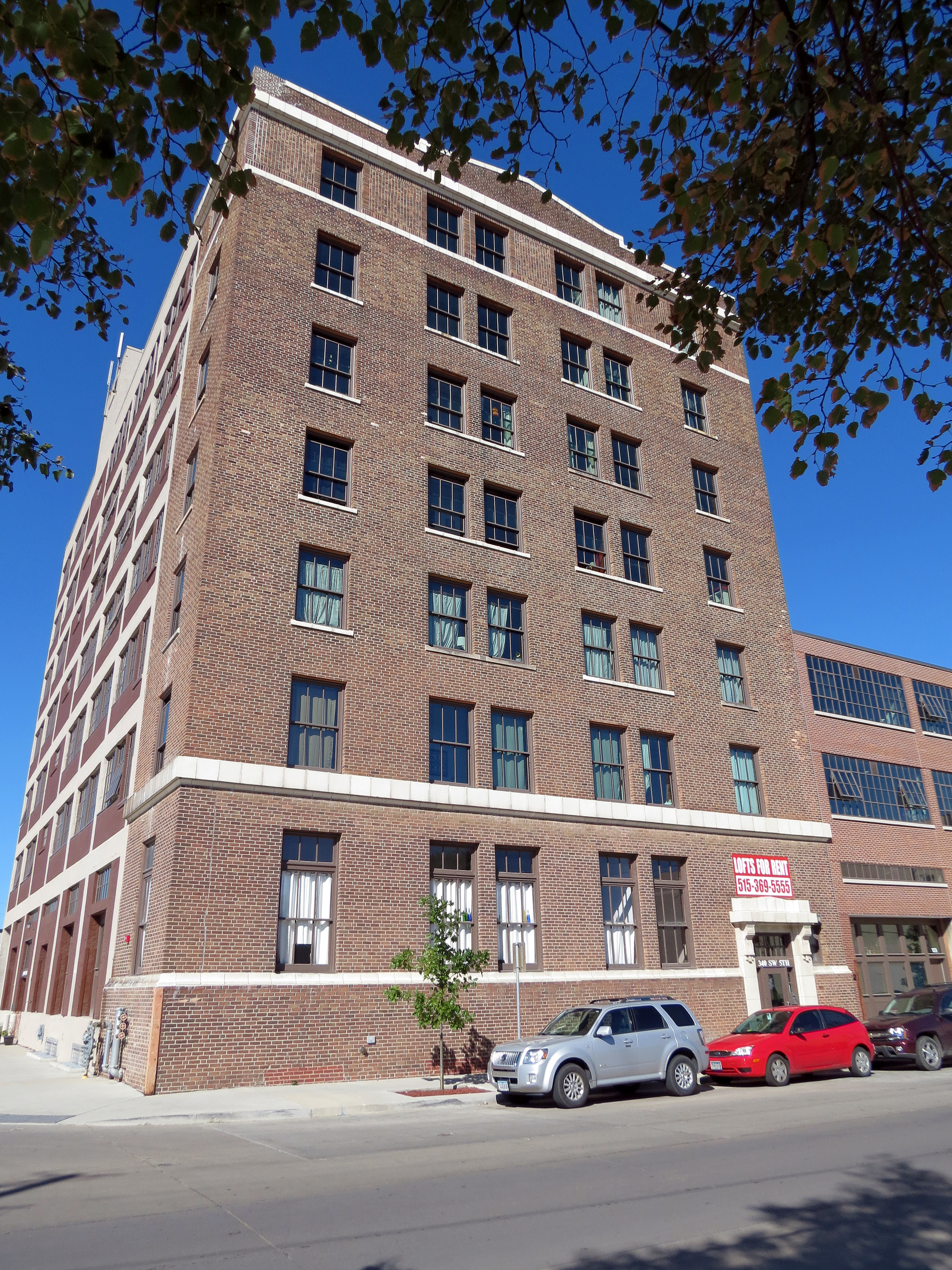

- Location within Iowa Location within the United States
- Location: 340 SW 5th St. Des Moines, Iowa
- Coordinates: 41°34′49.2″N 93°37′17.8″W
- Built: 1913
- Architect: Proudfoot, Bird & Rawson
- MPS: Architectural Legacy of Proudfoot & Bird in Iowa MPS
- NRHP reference No.: 10000894
- Added to NRHP: November 12, 2010

The Hubbell Warehouse is an historic building located in downtown Des Moines, Iowa, United States. It was listed on the National Register of Historic Places in 2010.

== Architecture ==
The building is a rigid frame structure built of concrete and faced with brick. The seven-story building rises 80 feet (24 m) above the ground, and was designed by the Des Moines architectural firm of Proudfoot, Bird & Rawson. The building at one time housed Firestone Rubber Company and L & L Insulation. It has been renovated into apartments.
