= Timeline of Des Moines, Iowa =

Coordinates: 41.591°N 93.621°W

The following is a timeline of the history of the city of Des Moines, Iowa, US.

== 19th century ==
- 1843 - Fort Des Moines U.S. Army post established.
- 1846
  - Fort Des Moines becomes seat of Polk County.
  - Subscription schools open "in cabins along Raccoon Row."
- 1848 - Woodland Cemetery established as Fort Des Moines Cemetery
- 1849 - Iowa Star newspaper begins publication.
- 1850 - Population: 502
- 1851
  - Flood of 1851.
  - September 22: Town incorporated.
- 1853 - Benjamin Luce elected mayor.
- 1854 - Western Stage Company begins operating.
- 1855 - Brass Band formed.
- 1856 - Iowa Weekly Citizen newspaper begins publication.
- 1857
  - Iowa state capital relocated to Des Moines from Iowa City.
  - City chartered.
- 1858 - Bridge built over Des Moines River at Court Avenue.
- 1860 - Population: 3,965
- 1861 - Western Union Telegraph begins operating.
- 1865 - Hook and Ladder fire company organized.
- 1866
  - August: Railroad begins operating.
  - Des Moines Library Association organized.
- 1867
  - April: Flood.
  - State Arsenal built.
- 1870
  - Polk County Woman's Suffrage Association organized.
  - Capital City Nurseries in business.
  - Population: 12,035
- 1872 - Caledonian Club organized.
- 1874 - Younker Brothers Department Store in business.
- 1875 - June: State Republican Convention held.
- 1878 - Cottage Hospital opens.
- 1880 - Populatiton: 22,408
- 1881 - Drake University established.
- 1883 - Foster Opera House built.
- 1884 - Capital City commercial college founded.
- 1885 - Des Moines Women's Club founded.
- 1886 - Iowa State Capitol built.
- 1888 - William Lytle Carpenter elected mayor.
- 1889 - Des Moines Zoological Gardens opens.
- 1890
  - Highland Park College founded.
  - Population: 50,093.
- 1893 - Sisters of Mercy from Davenport, Iowa open first hospital in Des Moines. Begin in temporary quarters at Hoyt Sherman Place. First permanent hospital opened at 4th and Ascension Streets, north of downtown, in 1895
- 1895
  - Grand View College founded.
  - Young Women's Christian Association founded.
- 1896 - Women's Press Club and Proteus Club founded.
- 1898 - S.S. Still College of Osteopathy founded.
- 1900 - Population: 62,139.

== 20th century ==
- 1901 - Fort Des Moines re-established.
- 1902 - Register and Leader newspaper in publication.
- 1904 - George W. Mattern, Republican, was elected mayor of Des Moines (March 28) over W. L. Carpenter, Democrat
- 1906 - Polk County Courthouse and The Lexington (apartment building) constructed.
- 1907 - New city charter and plan adopted.
- 1910
  - Hotel Cargill in business.
  - Population: 86,368.
- 1914 - Billy Robinson flies from Des Moines to Kentland, Indiana.
- 1915 - Riverview Park (amusement park) opens.
- 1917 - Fort Des Moines Provisional Army Officer Training School active.
- 1918 - 1918 influenza epidemic.
- 1920
  - Des Moines League of Women Voters founded.
  - Population: 126,468
- 1923
  - Ground-breaking for Salisbury House; property completed in 1928
  - Hoyt Sherman Place Theatre built.
- 1924 - Equitable Building constructed.
- 1930 - Population: 142,559
- 1931 - Allen Hazen Water Tower built.
- 1933 - Des Moines Airport built.
- 1934 - September: Labor strike.
- 1935 - Iowa Taxpayers Association headquartered in Des Moines.
- 1940 - Population: 159,819
- 1950 - Population: 177,965
- 1955 - Veterans Memorial Auditorium opens.
- 1958 - Sister city relationship established with Kofu, Japan.
- 1959 - Merle Hay Mall in business.
- 1960 - Population: 208,982
- 1965 - Iowa Genealogical Society founded.
- 1966 - Blank Park Zoo opens.
- 1970 - Population: 201,404
- 1972 - Gateway Dance Theatre founded.
- 1973 - Financial Center built.
- 1975 - Ruan Center built.
- 1978 - Fire in Merle Hay Mall.
- 1980 - Population: 191,003
- 1981 - Des Moines Marriott Hotel built.
- 1983 - Des Moines Rowing Club organized.
  - Des Moines Business Record Founded.
- 1985
  - Sister city relationships established with Shijiazhuang, China and Saint-Étienne, France.
  - Plaza Building constructed.
- 1986 - HUB Tower built.
- 1990 - Population: 193,187
- 1991 - 801 Grand built.
- 1992
  - Sister city relationship established with Stavropol, Russia.
  - Sec Taylor Stadium (now known as Principal Park) opens
- 1994 - Iowa Barnstormers begin play
- 1997
  - Preston Daniels becomes mayor.
  - EMC Insurance Building constructed.
  - Des Moines Dragons basketball team formed.
  - City website online.
- 2000 - Population: 197,800

== 21st century ==
- 2004 - Frank Cownie (D) elected mayor.
- 2005 - Casey's Center (formerly Wells Fargo Arena) officially opens.
- 2006 - Sister city relationship established with Province of Catanzaro, Italy.
- 2010 - Population: 203,433.
- 2020 - Population: 214,133

== See also ==
- List of Des Moines sports teams
- National Register of Historic Places listings in Polk County, Iowa
- History of Iowa
- List of Iowa railroads

== Bibliography ==
Published in the 19th century

- J. M. Dixon (1876), Centennial History of Polk County, Iowa, Des Moines: State Register, printer, OL 23285398M
- "Des Moines" . Encyclopædia Britannica. Vol. 7 (9th ed.). 1878. p. 130.
- Bushnell's Des Moines City Directory. 1879.
- Bushnell's Des Moines City Directory. 1888.
- Bushnell's Des Moines City Directory. 1891.
- Des Moines Illustrated Souvenir, Des Moines: Iowa Historical Illustrative Co., 1896, OL 23294047M

Published in the 20th century

- Des Moines Directory. R.L. Polk & Co. 1903, 1917, 1920, 1921
- Annual Report of the City of Des Moines, Des Moines City Council 1908-
- The Des Moines Plan of City Government, Des Moines: City Council, 1908, OL 14003588M
- "Des Moines" . Encyclopædia Britannica. Vol. 8 (11th ed.). 1910. p. 98.
- Hunt (1910). Des Moines Beautiful.
- Johnson Brigham (1911), Des Moines, Chicago: S.J. Clarke publishing company, OCLC 1851917
- Tacitus Hussey (1919), Beginnings: reminiscences of early Des Moines, Des Moines, Ia: American Lithograph and Ptg. Co., OCLC 3528149, OL 22851234M
- Federal Writers' Project (1938), "Des Moines", Iowa: a Guide to the Hawkeye State, American Guide Series, New York: Viking, hdl:2027/uc1.b4490617. + Chronology
- Ory Mazar Nergal, ed. (1980), "Des Moines, IA", Encyclopedia of American Cities, New York: E.P. Dutton, OL 4120668M
- Historic Walking Tours of Des Moines, Iowa, Public Library of Des Moines, Iowa, 1982
- Pratt (1990). From Cabin to Capital City.
- "Great Plains: Iowa: Des Moines", USA, Let's Go, New York: St. Martin's Press, 1999, OL 24937240M

Published in the 21st century

- Friedericks, William B. Covering Iowa: The History of the Des Moines Register and Tribune Company, 1849-1985 (Iowa State University Press, 2000), 318 pp.
- John Zeller (2005). "From the Real to the Ideal: Images of Des Moines in the Progressive Era". Drake University.
