= List of tallest buildings in Iowa =

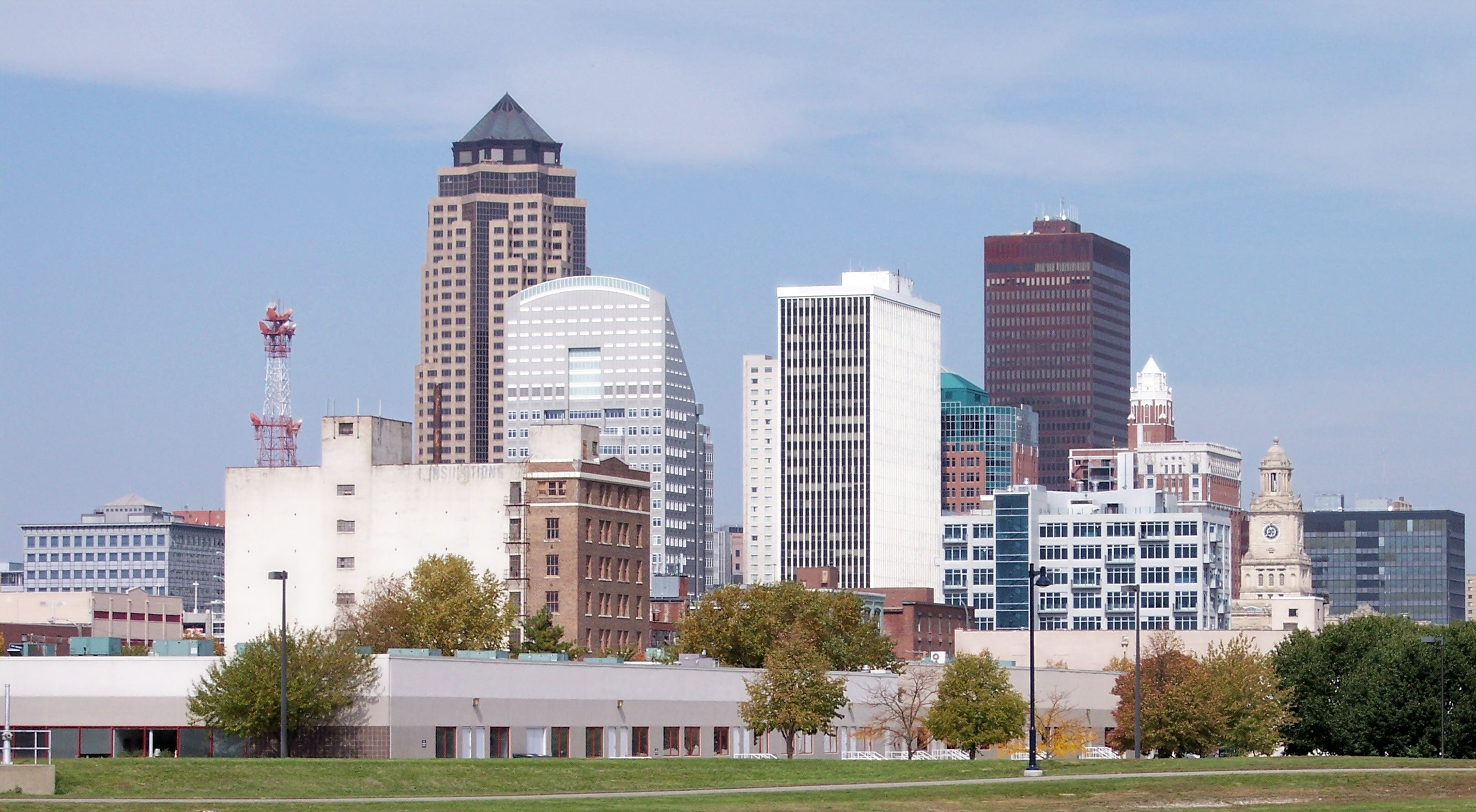
Skyline of Des Moines

The U.S. state of Iowa is home to 32 buildings over 150 feet (46 m) in height. There are 8 buildings classified as skyscrapers (325 feet (99 m)), all found in Des Moines. The tallest building in the state is the 801 Grand (previously The Principal Building), which rises 630 feet (190 m). It was completed in 1991 with 45 floors.

== Tallest buildings ==
This lists ranks Iowa structures based on standard height measurement. This includes spires and architectural details but does not include antenna masts. The "Year" column indicates the year in which the building was completed.

Rank	Name	Image	Height ft (m)	Floors	Year	City	Notes
1	801 Grand (previously The Principal Building)	801 Grand, since 1991 the tallest building in Des Moines and Iowa	630 (192)	45	1991	Des Moines	Office
2	Ruan Center	Ruan Center, from 1975 until 1991 the tallest building in Des Moines	460 (140)	36	1975	Des Moines	Office
3	Des Moines Marriott Hotel	Des Moines Marriott Hotel	365 (111)	33	1981	Des Moines	Hotel
4	Financial Center	Financial Center, from 1973 until 1975 the tallest building in Des Moines	345 (105)	25	1973	Des Moines	Office
5	Plaza Building	The Plaza Building	340 (104)	25	1985	Des Moines	Residential
T6	HUB Tower	HUB Tower	325 (99)	25	1986	Des Moines	Office
T6	EMC Insurance Building	EMC Insurance Building	325 (99)	19	1997	Des Moines	Office
8	Equitable Building	The Equitable Building, from 1924 until 1973 the tallest building in Des Moines	318 (97)	19	1924	Des Moines	Residential
9	Alliant Tower		285 (87)	21	1972	Cedar Rapids	Office - Tallest building outside of Des Moines
10	Iowa State Capitol		275 (84)	4	1884	Des Moines	Government
11	CenturyLink Complex		273 (83)	15	1928	Des Moines	Office
12	Davenport Bank and Trust		255 (77)	19	1927	Davenport	Office/Residential - Tallest Building outside of Des Moines and Cedar Rapids
13	Register and Tribune Building		243 (74)	14	1916	Des Moines	Office
14	Cedar River Tower		237 (72)	25	1974	Cedar Rapids	Residential/Office
15	MidAmerican Building		220 (67)	15	1995	Davenport	Office
16	Plaza 425		207 (63)	14	1983	Cedar Rapids	Office
17	Dubuque County Courthouse		205 (62)	5	1893	Dubuque	Government
18	The Chauncey	Chauncey Building Iowa City	191 (58)	15	2019	Iowa City	Hotel/Residential
19T	Des Moines Building		190 (58)	14	1930	Des Moines	Office/Residential
19T	Quaker Oats Plant		190 (58)	13	1927	Cedar Rapids	Industrial
21	OpenLoop Tower (previously Bank of America Building)		186 (57)	14	1966	Des Moines	Office
22	Two Ruan Center		185 (56)	14	1982	Des Moines	Office
23	CRST Tower		180 (54)	11	2017	Cedar Rapids	Office
24	Veterans Memorial Building		175 (53)	10	1927	Cedar Rapids	Government
25T	Liberty Building		174 (53)	12	1923	Des Moines	Mixed Use
25T	Fleming Building		174 (53)	11	1909	Des Moines	Residential
27T	Hippee Building		172 (52)	12	1913	Des Moines	Hotel
27T	Davis Brown Tower		172 (52)	13	2008	Des Moines	Office
29	Badgerow Building		169 (52)	12	1933	Sioux City	Office
30	US Bank Building		166 (50)	12	1926	Cedar Rapids	Office
31	Polk County Courthouse		160 (48)	4	1906	Des Moines	Government
32	Hubbell Building		150 (45)	10	1913	Des Moines	Residential

Note: Churches have been omitted from this list.

== Tallest buildings under construction ==
Name	Picture	Height (ft)	Floors	Status	Completion Year	City
515 Walnut		347	33	Under Construction	2027 (est.)	Des Moines

== Timeline of Tallest Buildings ==
Years as Tallest	Name	Height ft (m)	Floors
1884–1924	Iowa State Capitol	275 (84)	n/a
1924–1973	Equitable Building	318 (97)	19
1973–1975	Financial Center	345 (105)	25
1975–1991	Ruan Center	460 (140)	36
1991–Present	801 Grand	630 (192)	45

== Tall buildings prior to 1884 ==
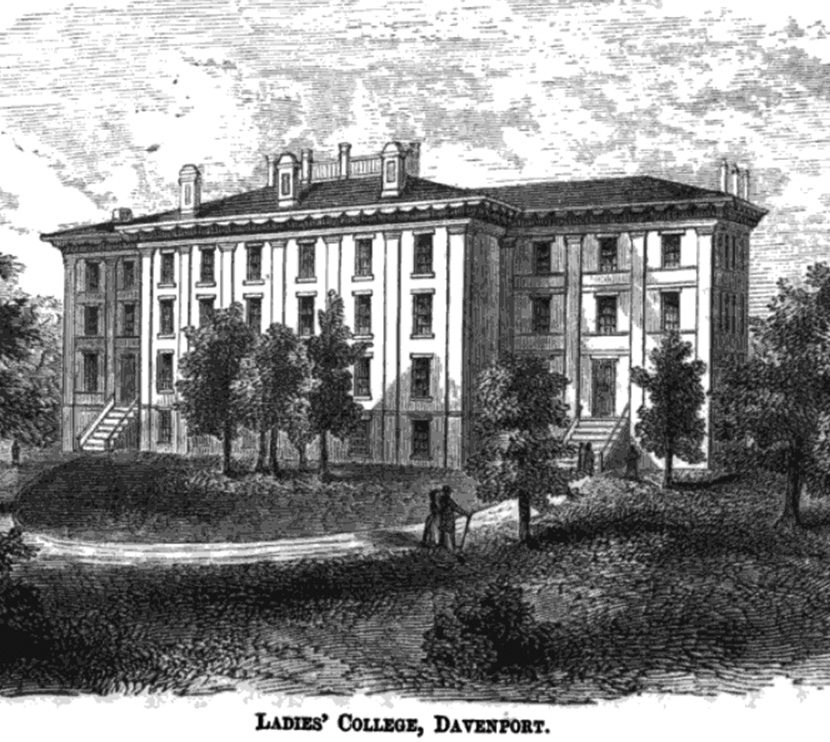
Ladies' College Building, Davenport, 1856, later Mount Ida Female College.

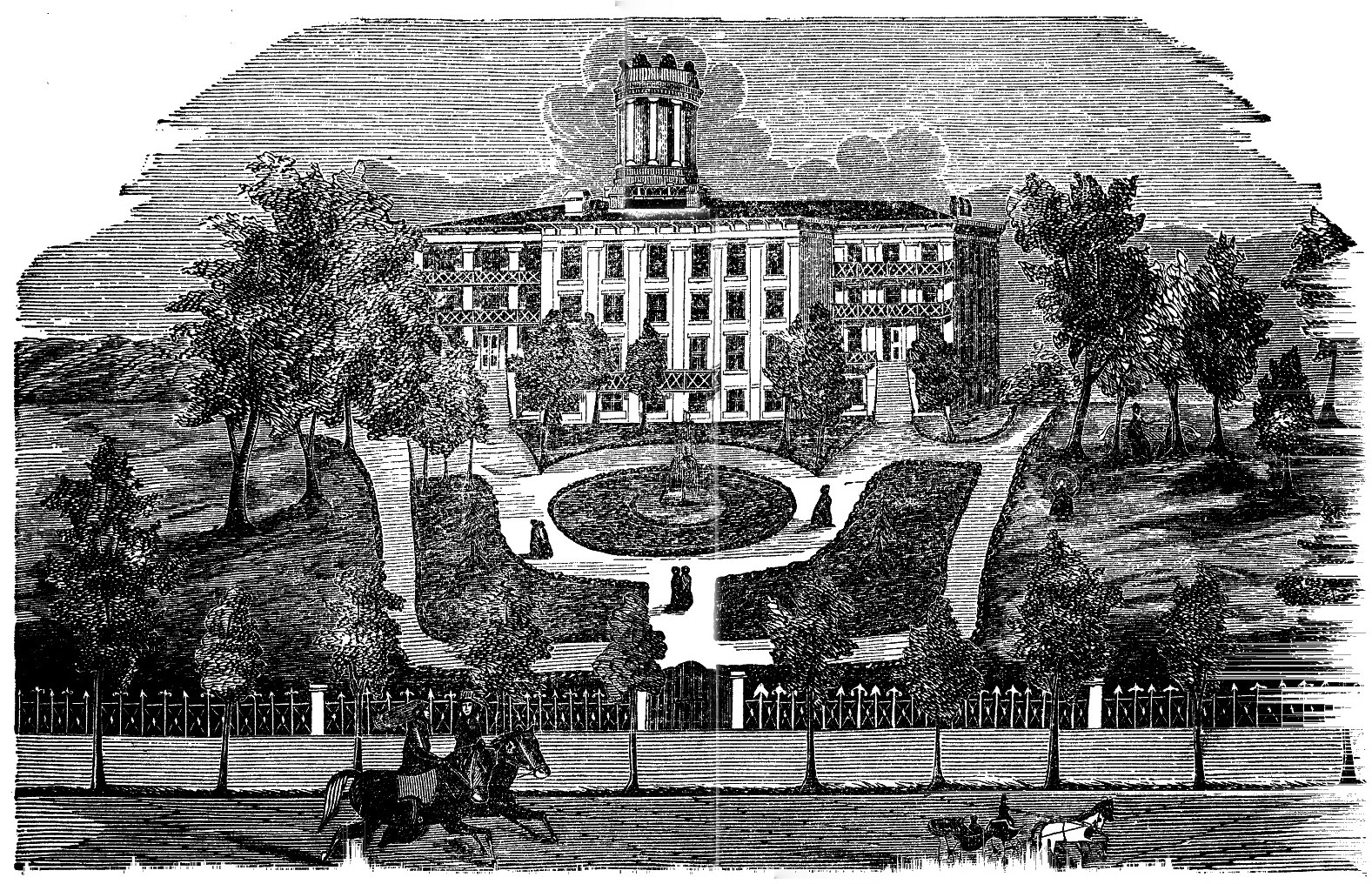
Mount Ida Female College in 1858, after dome was added.

There does not seem to have been any effort to document the tallest building in Iowa prior to the construction of the State Capitol in 1884. This list shows buildings which may have been the tallest in Iowa prior to 1884, excluding church steeples.

Years as Tallest	Name	Height ft (m)	Floors
1840–1856	Old Capitol, Iowa City	114 (35)	n/a
1856–1884	Shot Tower, Dubuque	120 (37)	10

Other early tall building include:

- Mount Ida Female College, Davenport, 1856. First four-story dwelling, later had a high dome placed on top, may have rivaled Old Capitol in height.
- Fort Madison, 1808, probably the first two-story buildings in what would become Iowa.

== See also ==
- List of tallest buildings in the Quad Cities
- List of tallest buildings in Cedar Rapids
