= The Fifth (building) =

Cancelled high-rise building in Des Moines

- Interactive map of the The Fifth area

General information
- Status: Never built
- Type: High-rise
- Location: 201 5th Avenue, Des Moines, Iowa, United States
- Coordinates: 41.5852°N 93.6231°W
- Construction started: 2021
- Completed: Late 2024, if completed
- Cost: $180 Million

Height
- Roof: 466 feet
- Top floor: 40

Technical details
- Floor count: 40
- Lifts/elevators: Likely 6

Design and construction
- Architect: Solomon Cordwell Buenz
- Developer: Mandelbaum Properties

Other information
- Public transit: DART

The Fifth was a proposed high-rise building in Des Moines, Iowa, United States. Developed by Mandelbaum Properties, had it been completed it would have been the second tallest building in Iowa. The building was to consist of a movie theater, hotel, parking garage, retail, and residential space. Construction was delayed several times, and the skyscraper was later cancelled in 2022.

== History ==
In April 2016, the Des Moines City Council approved a preliminary development agreement to allow the 32 story tower to be constructed for a cost of around $107 million. At that point, the plan was to include 200 luxury condos, a movie theater, climbing facility, jazz club, daycare, and office space. The climbing facility, jazz club and daycare facility were removed from the project, and a hotel was later added.

Official plans were announced in 2019 and would be located at Fifth Avenue between Court Avenue and Walnut Street in Downtown Des Moines, and would have been Iowa's second tallest building had it been completed. The building was made up of three phases. The first phase was a 12 story parking garage. The second and third phases were the theater and the tower itself. being constructed in three phases. Phase one was a 12 story parking garage. Phases two and three were the tower and theater.

A vote to begin construction occurred in September 2018. The developers had until October 2019 to start construction, and had to finish by September 2021. However, construction was delayed several times, with the city arguing in court that the developers failed to meet key construction points. The building was later cancelled in 2022, with the parking garage being sold to the city. A judge later ruled that the city owed the developers $5 million, despite the tower never being completed.

== See also ==
- List of tallest buildings in Iowa
