= Wells Fargo history =

Wells Fargo History may refer to:

- The History of Wells Fargo
- The Wells Fargo History Museum
