= Plaza Building (Des Moines, Iowa) =

Skyscraper condominium building in Des Moines

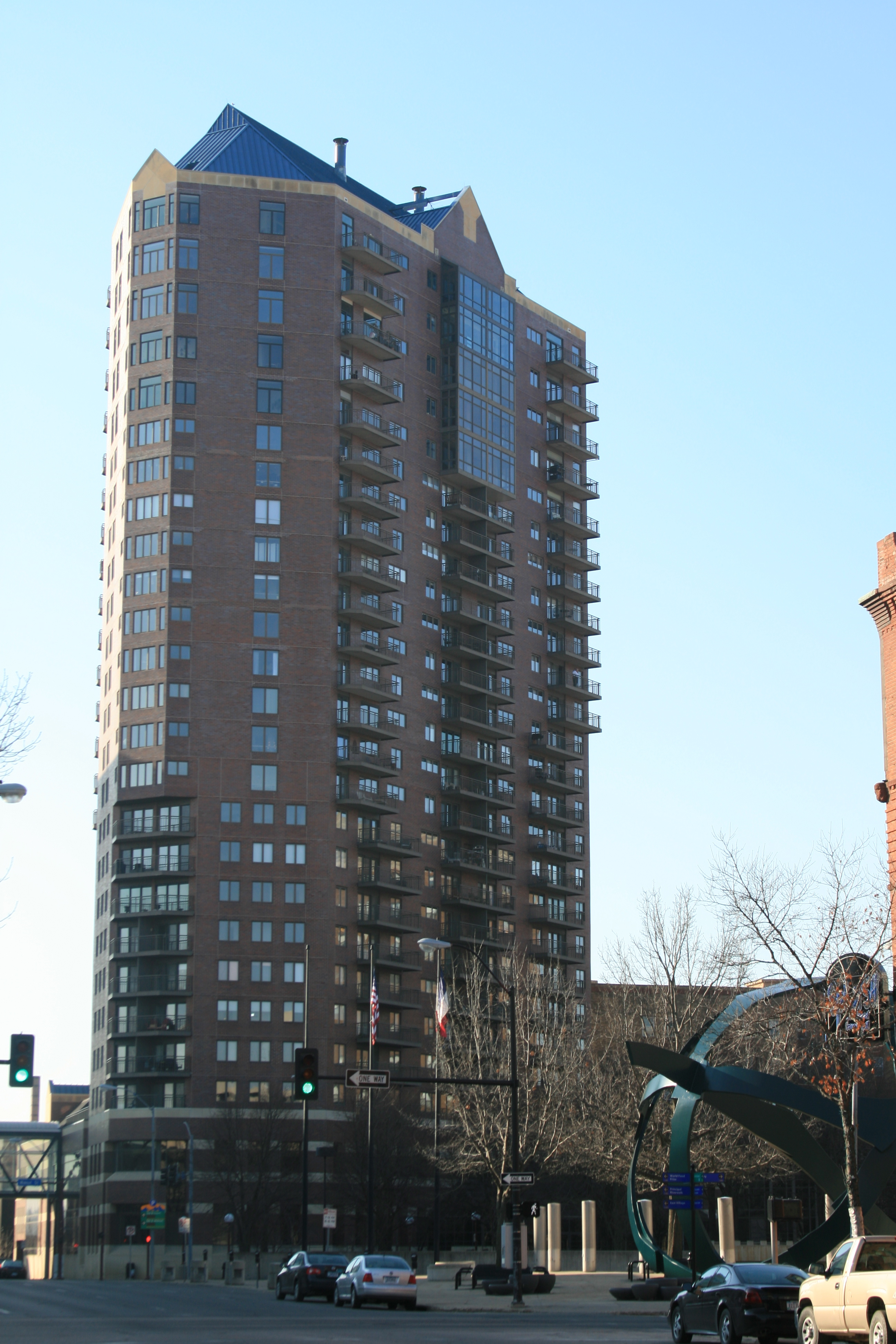
- Interactive map of the Plaza Building area

General information
- Type: Residential
- Location: 300 Walnut Street, Des Moines, Iowa, United States
- Coordinates: 41°35′10″N 93°37′17″W
- Construction started: 1984
- Completed: November of 1985
- Operator: FirstService Residential

Height
- Roof: 340 ft (100 m)
- Top floor: 25th (Pool on third floor)

Technical details
- Floor count: 25 (With a two-story Underground Garage)
- Lifts/elevators: Three

Design and construction
- Architects: Stageberg Beyer Sachs, Inc.
- Developer: Ted Glasrud Associates

Other information
- Public transit: DART

The Plaza Building, also known as The Plaza Condominiums, is a skyscraper condominium building located in downtown Des Moines, Iowa, United States. The building rises 25 floors and 340 feet (104 m) in height. It is currently the 5th-tallest building in the city, but will soon be the 6th after the completion of the skyscraper, 515 Tower which will only be a couple blocks away. Designed by the architectural firm of Stageberg Beyer Sachs, Inc., the building was completed in 1985. It is essentially a modernist building, but it exhibits elements of the Postmodern style. These are found in the light and dark colored banding at the base and the blue hipped and gabled roof.

== History ==
In the 1980s, the Plaza joined the Civic Center of Greater Des Moines and Cowles Commons in helping to spur the revival of the downtown area. The Plaza overlooks these cultural attractions and one of the benefits of the building's design is that it is positioned at a 45-degree angle to give sunlight and views to as many residents as possible. Over the years, The Plaza has proven itself as a luxury living solution for downtown Des Moines with a continued return on investment.

There are currently 186 residential units with guidelines on the number of units that can be subleased to ensure owner interest in the building. Units vary from 650 to 5,000 square feet. The building is connected to the Des Moines Skywalk system, and has its own parking garage for residents underground. There is also a workout room as well as a pool on the third floor.

On February 6, 2016 former Principal CEO David Hurd fell to his death from the 22nd floor. To this day, the motive remains uncertain but he had health issues for the last three years of his life.

== Notable residents ==
- G. David Hurd, CEO Principal Financial

☆Connie Wimer, Creator and owner of Business Record

== See also ==
- List of tallest buildings in Iowa
