= 801 Grand =

Skyscraper in Des Moines, Iowa, US

801 Grand High Rise Building

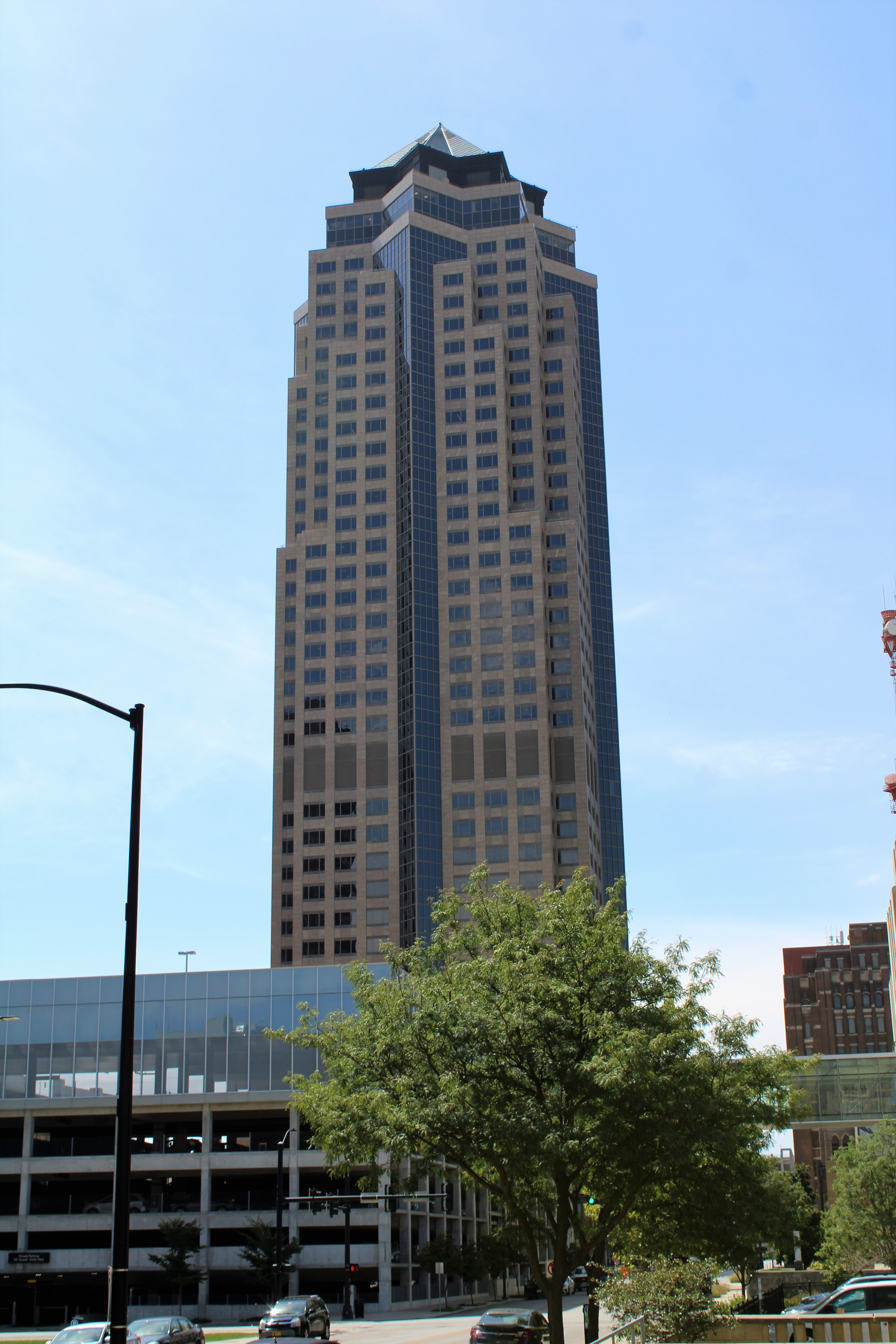
- The 801 Grand in 2022
- Interactive map of the 801 Grand High Rise Building area

General information
- Location: 801 Grand Avenue; Des Moines, Iowa, United States
- Construction started: 1989
- Completed: 1991
- Owner: Principal Financial Group

Height
- Roof: 630 ft (190 m)

Technical details
- Floor count: 45
- Floor area: 922,467 sq ft (85,700.0 m^{2})

Design and construction
- Architect: HOK

Other information
- Public transit: DART

Website
- 801grand.com

801 Grand High Rise Building (referred to as the 801 Grand Building and previously known as The Principal Building) is an office skyscraper in Des Moines, Iowa, United States, operated and managed by JLL Americas and owned by Principal Financial Group (Principal Real Estate). The building was constructed from 1989 to 1991; and at a height of 630 feet (190 m) and 45 stories, it is the tallest building in both Des Moines and the state of Iowa. It is part of a larger downtown campus run by Principal Financial Group and features a skywalk and an eight-sided copper pyramid at its top.

== History ==
Construction of the 801 Grand Building began in 1989, with Principal Financial Group serving as the developers and owners. In February 1989, the foundation, consisting of 38,860 cubic yards (29,710 m^{3}) of concrete, was poured, and 139 caissons were drilled. The building was designed by Hellmuth Obata and Kassabaum. During the design phase of the building, the tower was designed to house office spaces and blend with the architecture of the local area. The tower cost $70 million to construct, with an additional $19 million parking lot being constructed and financed by the city of Des Moines. The building featured 705,000 square feet (65,500 m^{2}) of office space, with 62 percent having been leased prior to completion of the building. In 1990, Democratic gubernatorial candidate Donald Avenson toured the nearly completed building, specifically visiting the 40th and 41st floors. In total, the project involved approximately 500 workers representing a dozen separate labor unions.

The 45-story 801 Grand Building was completed and opened in 1991. The company JLL Americas serves as the buildings' manager. Upon completion, the 630-foot (190 m) building overtook the Ruan Center as the tallest building in Iowa; and also surpassed both One Kansas City Place and the Metropolitan Square in St. Louis, making it the tallest building in the Midwest between Chicago and Denver. This record was broken by Omaha's First National Bank Tower in 2002.

In 2014, Principal Financial Group refitted their entire downtown campus with diode lights. Originally, the campus featured white lights but these were changed to LEDs due to issues with the white lights attracting and killing corn borer moths. This project was part of a $284 million renovation.

== Design ==
The 801 Grand Building follows a postmodern design. The tower's exterior is built out of granite with the upper levels featuring terraces and setbacks. This was designed to minimize the building's impact on the city's skyline. In total, the building's walls required a total of 3,000,000 pounds (1,400,000 kg) of granite. The granite used in the 801 Grand's exterior is specifically Venetian gold granite, which is known for its distinctive golden color. The stone used for the 801 was originally mined in Brazil, processed in Italy, and imported to Des Moines. Conversely, the windows are framed with a darker variant of granite.

The top of the building is an eight-sided pyramid covered in copper. Originally, the designers intended the copper to turn to a verdigris color via oxidation. Furthermore, the original 1987 designs indicate a light green cap that was designed to blend the building's profile in with the rest of Des Moines's skyline. This was never achieved due to the relatively low levels of sulfur pollution in the atmosphere, which led to the copper pyramid oxidizing to a deep brown color.

The bottom three floors of the 801 Grand are designated for retail stores and restaurants, with the upper levels designated for office space. The third floor connects to a skywalk system and the top two floors serve as a private restaurant. The build was named one of the 50 most significant Iowa Buildings of the 20th Century by the Iowan chapter of the American Institute of Architects.

== Notable tenants ==
In 1993, the 801 Chophouse was established on the second floor of the 801 Grand. In 2022, the Des Moines Register listed the 801 Chophouse among the 12 best steakhouses in Des Moines. This restaurant serves as the chain's flagship and features a gallery of cattle-themed artwork. The steakhouse has been used as a de facto clubhouse during the Iowa caucuses, and it is commonly visited by politicians and news personnel. In 2026, 801 Restaurant Group, the owner of 801 Chophouse, filed for Chapter 11 bankruptcy protection, reporting over $18.5 million in liabilities primarily caused due to rising beef prices, whilst having $15 million in assets.

In 2010, the First Church of Christ, Scientist relocated from their Des Moines building to the 801 Grand. In 2020, insurance company F&G moved their headquarters to the 801 Grand Building. This move involved a $9.4 million renovation of 83,000 square feet (7,700 m^{2}) of office space.

== Gallery ==
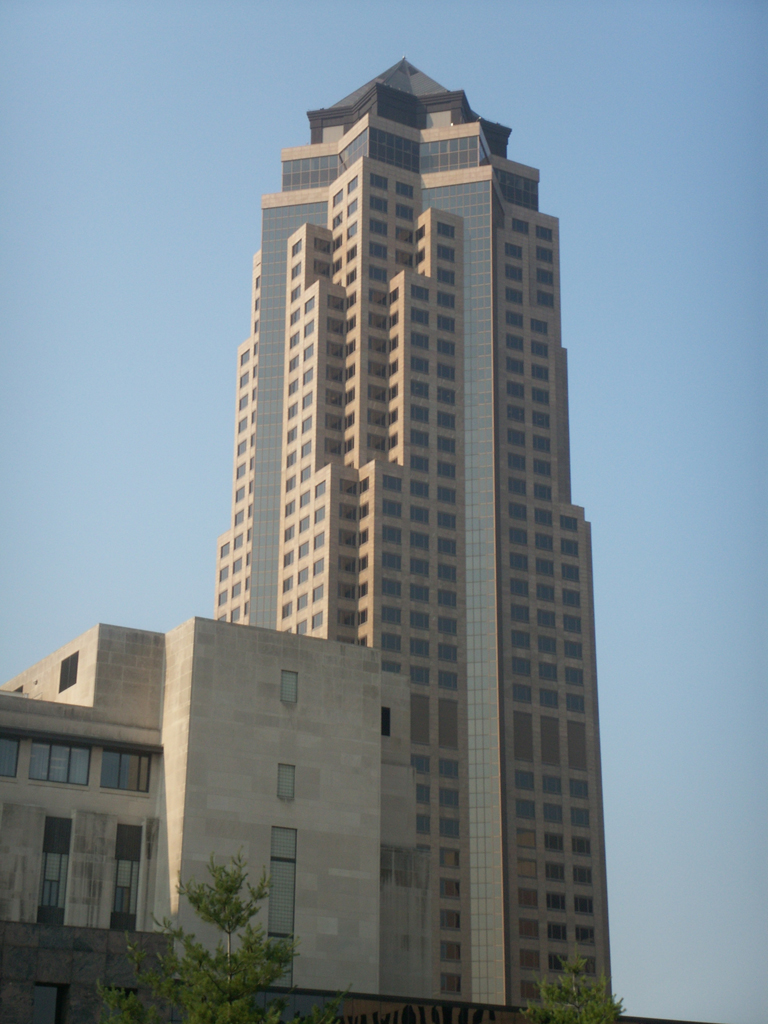
View of the north-east corner of 801 Grand. 711 High Street. The headquarters of Principal Financial Group is in the foreground.

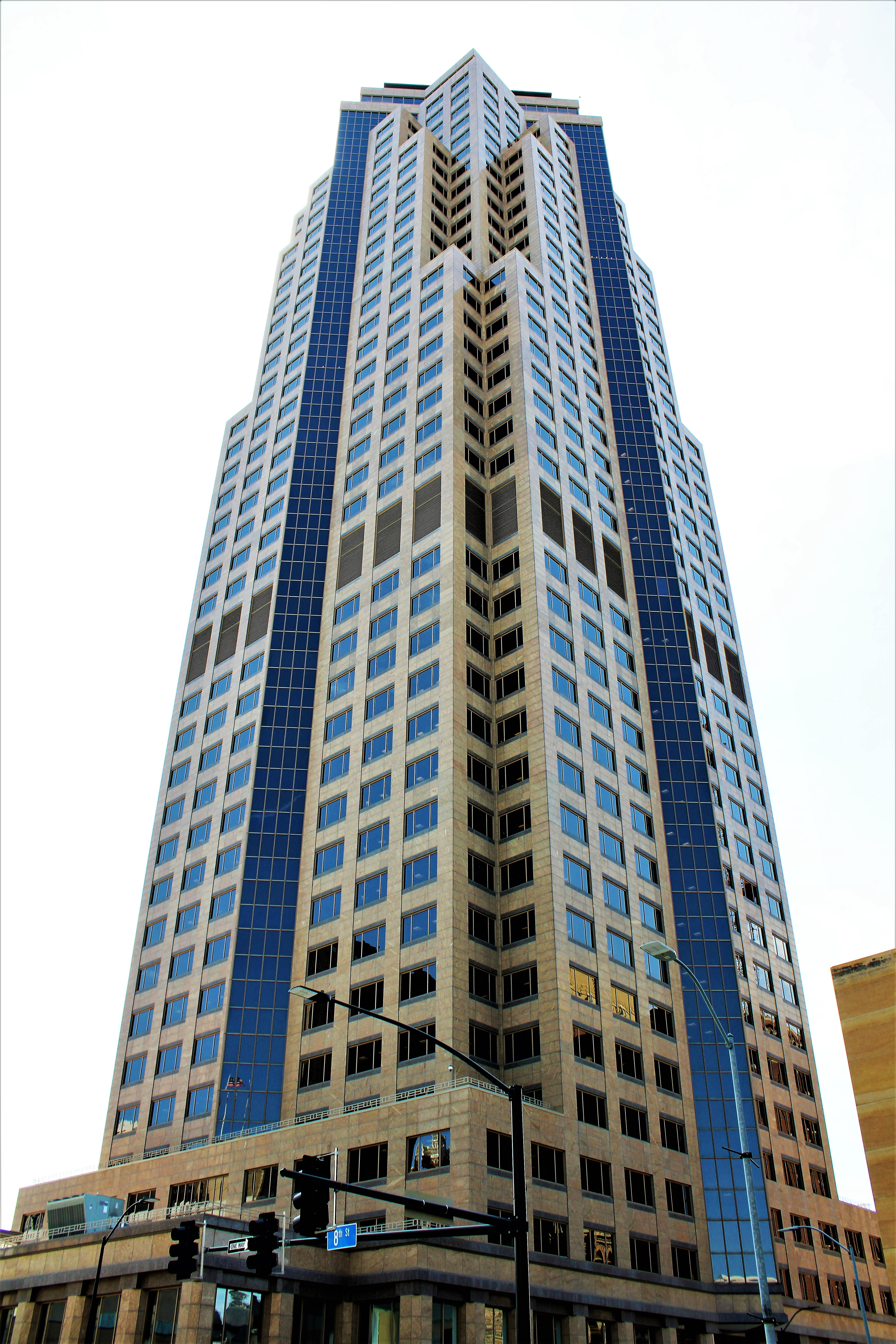
801 Grand pictured from the corner of 8th Street and Grand Avenue

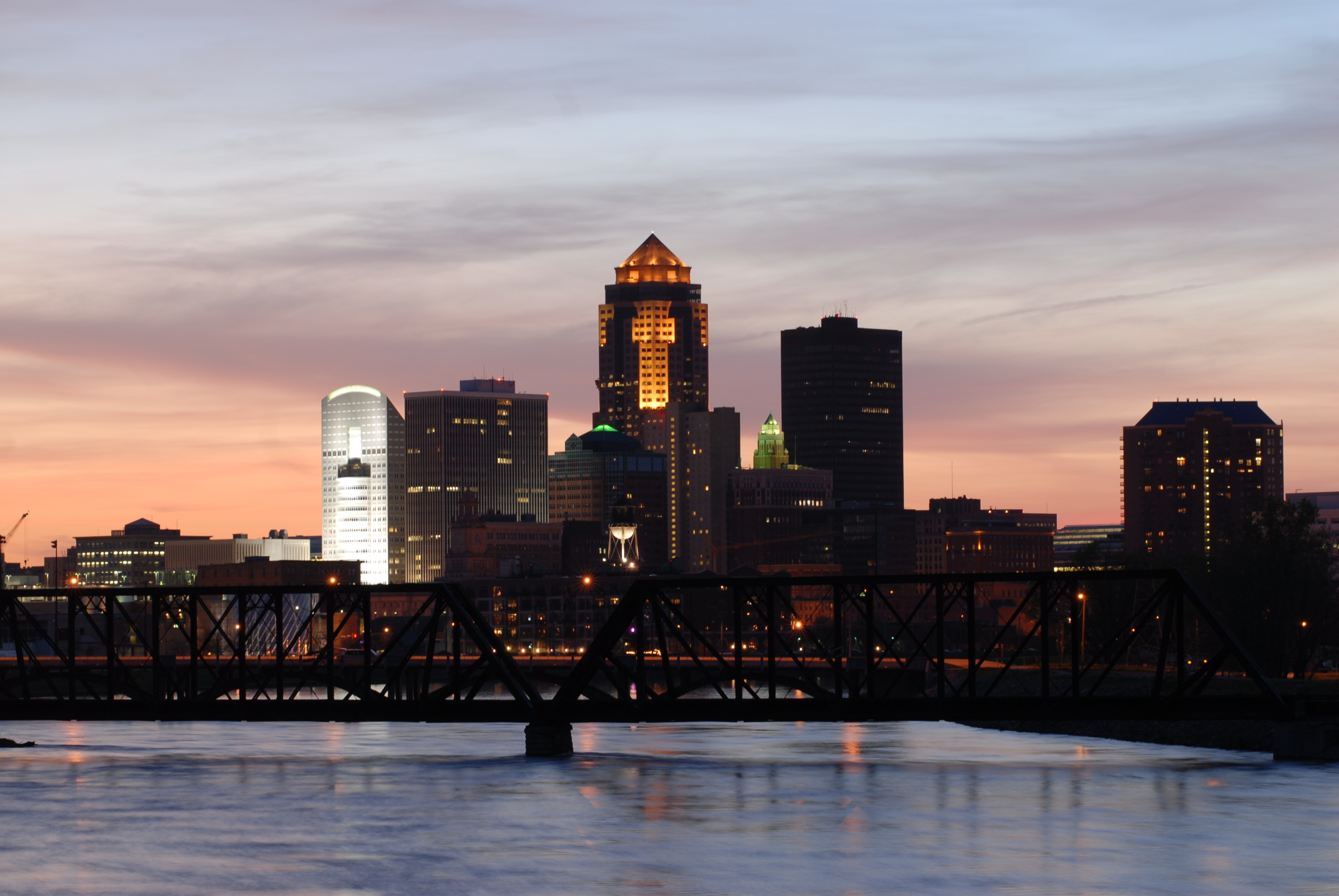
Des Moines skyline at dusk, with the 801 Grand (center) lit up

== See also ==
- List of tallest buildings in Iowa
- List of tallest buildings by U.S. state

Preceded by Ruan Center	Tallest Building in Iowa; 1991—present	Succeeded by None
