= Financial Center (Iowa) =

Skyscraper in Des Moines, Iowa

Coordinates: 41.5855°N 93.6252°W

- Financial Center viewed from the southwest

General information
- Location: Des Moines, Iowa, United States
- Completed: 1973

Height
- Height: 345 ft (105 m)

Technical details
- Floor count: 25

Other information
- Public transit: DART
- Financial Center Office Building
- U.S. National Register of Historic Places
- NRHP reference No.: 100011415
- Added to NRHP: April 22, 2025

Financial Center is a skyscraper located in the downtown area of Des Moines, Iowa, United States. It was completed in 1973 and stands at a height of 345 ft (105 m). It was the tallest building in the city and state until the completion of the Ruan Center in 1975, and is currently the fourth tallest. It was built in the international style, an architectural style that was particularly popular at the time of the building's construction.

The building consists mainly of office space and is connected to Des Moines' skywalk system. The ground floor used to house a Walgreens location which closed in 2025, and housed a Wells Fargo History Museum from November 2016 until 2020. Also, since 2015 the building has LED lights that change colors making it stand out among the skyline. The building is currently under renovation by Lawmark Capital including adding up to 198 apartment units on the lower 18 floors of the building. The street-level portion of the property is expected to include a restaurant, café, mail room, and bike storage. It was listed on the National Register of Historic Places in 2025.

== See also ==
- Des Moines, Iowa
- List of tallest buildings in Iowa

Preceded by Equitable Building	Tallest Building in Iowa; 1973—1975; 105m	Succeeded by Ruan Center
