= Ruan Center =

Skyscraper in Des Moines, Iowa, US

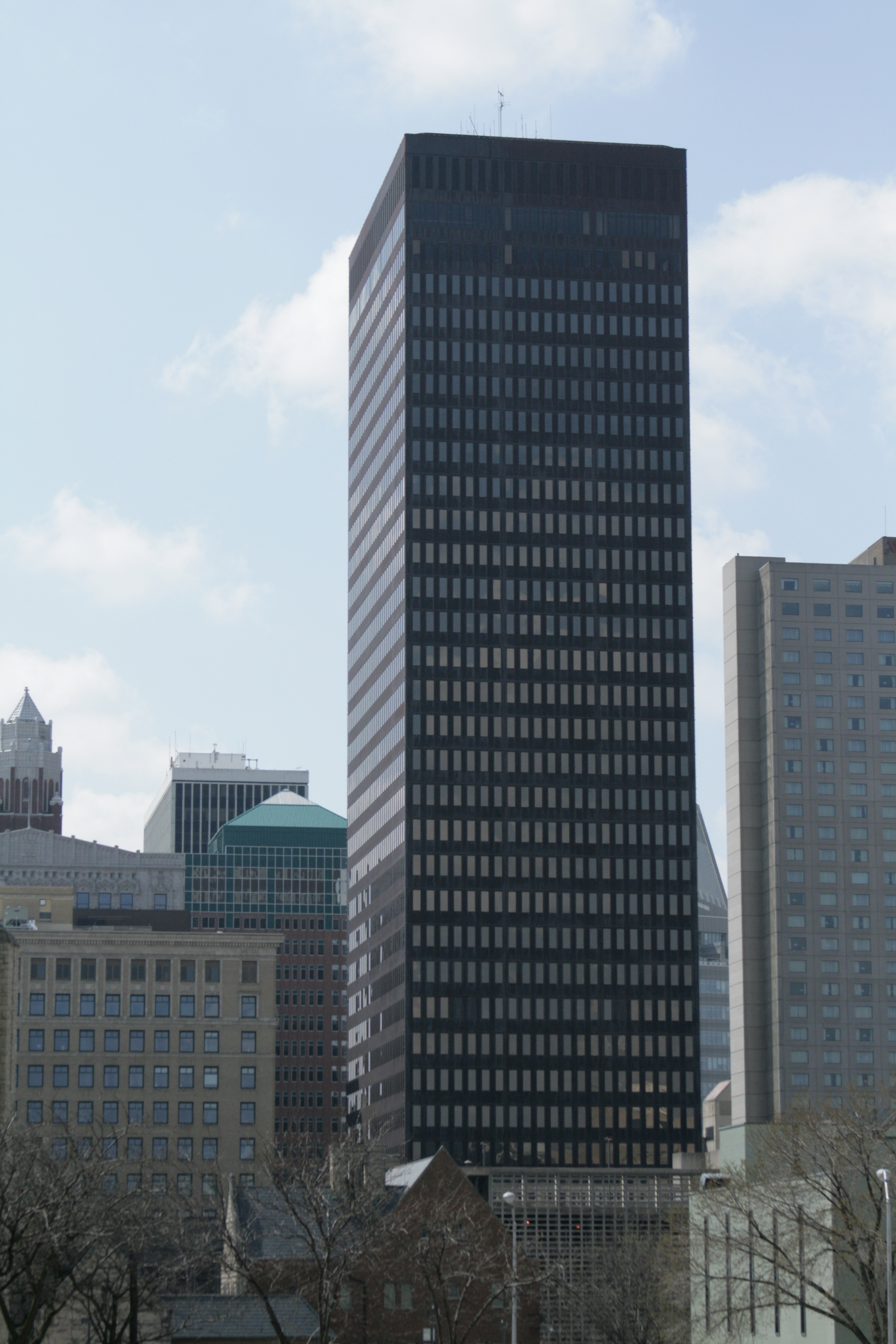
- Ruan Building in Spring of 2008
- Interactive map of the Ruan Center area

General information
- Status: Completed
- Type: Office space
- Location: 666 Grand Avenue; Des Moines, Iowa; United States
- Coordinates: 41.587°N 93.626°W
- Construction started: 1973
- Completed: 1975
- Owner: Ruan Transportation

Height
- Height: 459 ft (140 m)
- Top floor: 36

Technical details
- Floor count: 36
- Lifts/elevators: 13

Design and construction
- Architect: Kendall Griffith Russell Artiaga

Other information
- Public transit: DART
- Ruan Center & Carriers Building
- U.S. National Register of Historic Places
- Built: 1975 (Ruan Center); 1982 (Carriers Building)
- NRHP reference No.: 100011416
- Added to NRHP: January 30, 2025

The Ruan Center is a skyscraper located at 666 Grand Avenue in Des Moines, Iowa, which was built by Ruan Transportation. The building was completed in 1975 and stands at a height of 459 ft (140 m), and was the tallest building in Iowa until the completion of 801 Grand in 1991. The south side of the building's site was formerly occupied by The Chamberlain Hotel.

The Ruan Center is locally known as the "rusty skyscraper", for its Cor-Ten steel cladding that sheds rust. The exterior skin is composed of 1,600 US tons of Cor-Ten steel, and 4,700 tons of structural steel were used in the building's frame.

The building consists mainly of office space and is connected to Des Moines' skywalk system. The 33rd and 34th floors are home to the Des Moines Club, a private members-only restaurant.

The Ruan Center was named one of the 50 Most Significant Iowa Buildings of the 20th Century by the Iowa chapter of the American Institute of Architects. Along with the neighboring Two Ruan Center, also known as the Carriers Building, Ruan Center was listed on the National Register of Historic Places in 2025. Completed in 1982, Two Ruan Center was built as the headquarters for long-haul trucking liability insurer Carriers Insurance Company. The company became insolvent in 1986 and the building's name was changed to Two Ruan Center later the same year. Plans have been developed to turn Two Ruan Center into an apartment building.

== See also ==
- List of tallest buildings in Iowa
- National Register of Historic Places listings in Des Moines, Iowa

Preceded by Financial Center	Tallest Building in Iowa; 1975—1991; 140m	Succeeded by 801 Grand
