= Des Moines Marriott Hotel =

Skyscraper hotel in Iowa, United States

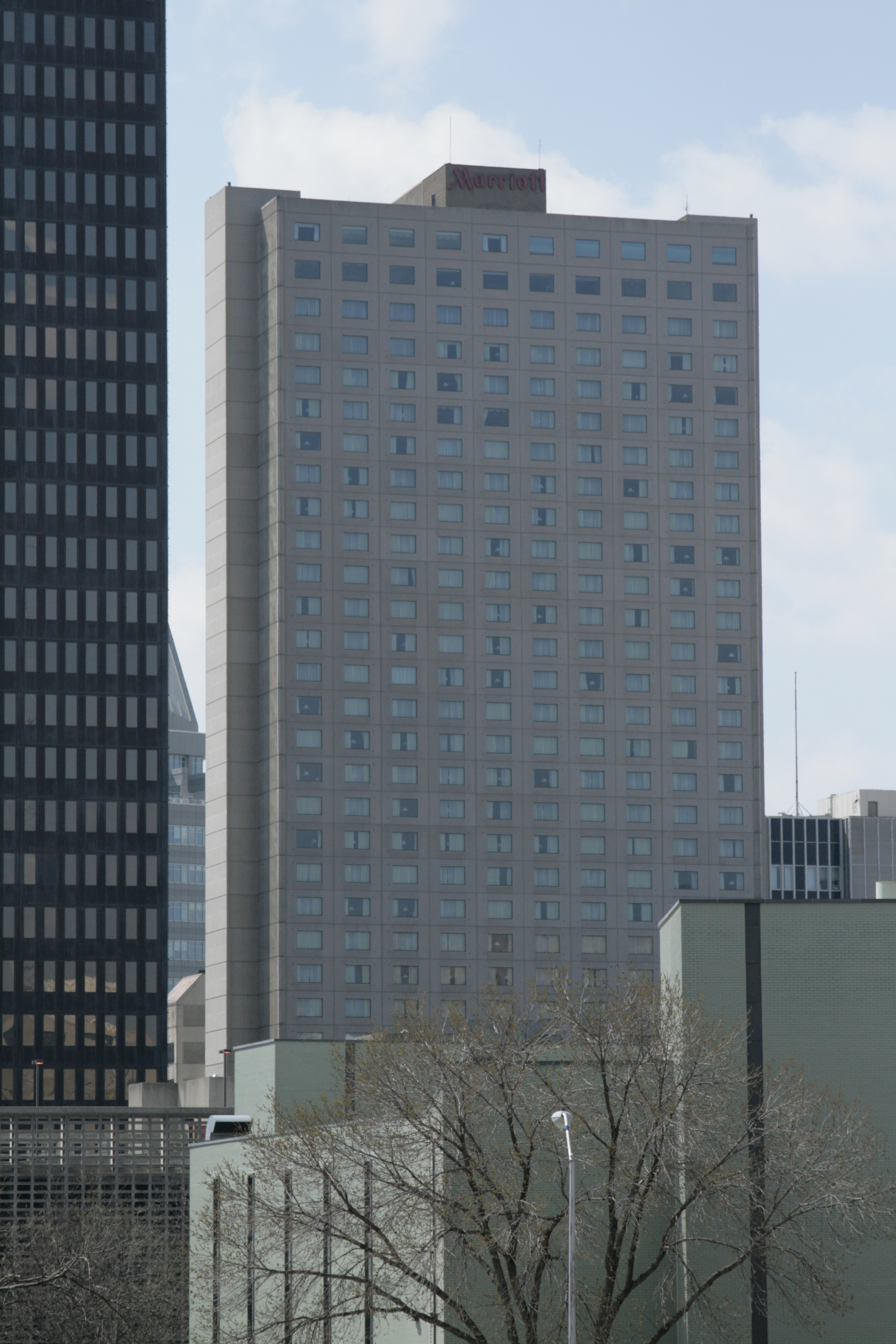
- Interactive map of the Des Moines Marriott Hotel area

General information
- Type: Hotel
- Location: 700 Grand Avenue, Des Moines, Iowa, United States
- Coordinates: 41°35′13″N 93°37′36″W
- Completed: 1981
- Opening: 1981
- Owner: Marriott International

Height
- Roof: 365 ft (111 m)

Technical details
- Floor count: 33
- Lifts/elevators: 4

Other information
- Public transit: DART

Website
- Marriot.com

The Des Moines Marriott Hotel is a skyscraper hotel located in Downtown Des Moines, Iowa, United States. The building rises 33 floors and 365 feet (111 m) in height. It is currently the 3rd-tallest building in the city and the tallest hotel in Iowa. The structure was completed in 1981 and contains 417 guest rooms. The property had been previously occupied by the Royal Union Life Building.

== See also ==
- List of tallest buildings in Iowa
