= EMC Insurance Building =

American skyscraper office building located in downtown Des Moines, Iowa

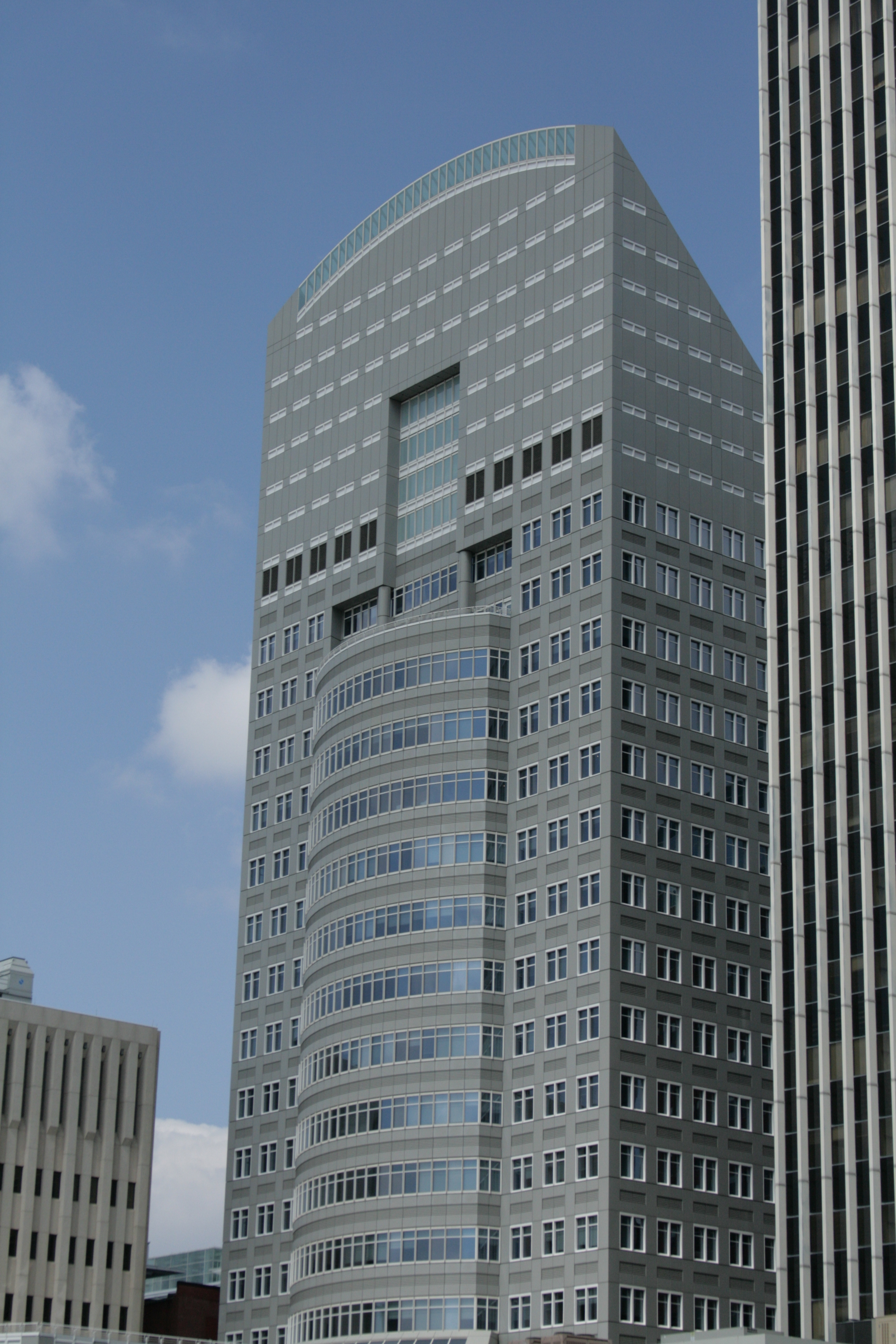
- Interactive map of the EMC Insurance Building area

General information
- Type: Office
- Location: 700 Walnut Street, Des Moines, Iowa, United States
- Coordinates: 41°35′6″N 93°37′33″W
- Completed: 1997

Height
- Roof: 325 ft (99 m)

Technical details
- Floor count: 19

Design and construction
- Architect: Brooks Borg Skiles Architecture Engineering

Other information
- Public transit: DART

Website
- www.emcins.com

The EMC Insurance Building is a skyscraper office building located in downtown Des Moines, Iowa, United States. The building rises 19 floors and 325 feet (99 m) in height. It is currently tied with the HUB Tower as the 6th-tallest building in the city. Designed by Brooks Borg Skiles Architecture Engineering, the building was completed in 1997 for $54 million. The building was named one of the 50 Most Significant Iowa Buildings of the 20th Century by the American Institute of Architects Iowa chapter.

There have been comparisons made between the curves on the back of the building and an Absolut Vodka bottle.

The Fight for Air Climb utilized the stairwells in the EMC Insurance Building on April 8, 2018, in order for participants to raise funds for the American Lung Association.

== See also ==
- List of tallest buildings in Iowa
