= HUB Tower =

American high-rise office building located in downtown Des Moines, Iowa

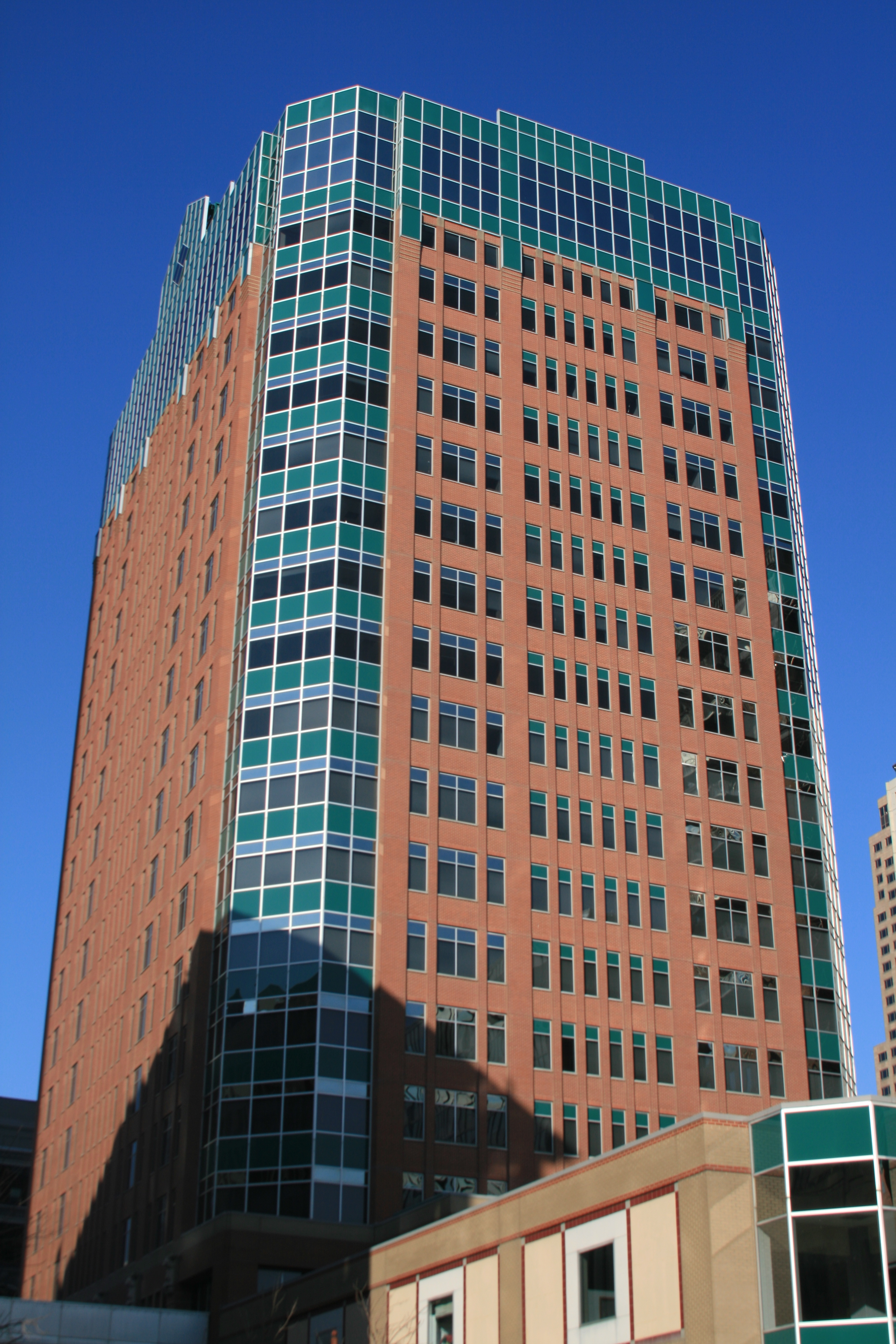
- Interactive map of the HUB Tower area

General information
- Status: Completed
- Type: Office
- Location: 699 Walnut Street, Des Moines, Iowa, United States
- Coordinates: 41°35′9.5″N 93°37′32″W
- Completed: 1986

Height
- Roof: 325 ft (99 m)

Technical details
- Floor count: 25

Design and construction
- Architect: Herbert Lewis Kruse Blunck Architecture
- Main contractor: The Weitz Company

Other information
- Public transit: DART

The HUB Tower is a high-rise office building located in downtown Des Moines, Iowa, United States. The building rises 25 floors and 325 feet (99 m) in height. It is tied with the EMC Insurance Building for the title of the 6th-tallest building in the city. Designed by Herbert Lewis Kruse Blunck Architecture in the Postmodern style, the building was completed in 1986. The building consists of an 18-story office tower that sits on a seven-story base, which houses a retail mall. The façade is composed of glass, metal and brick. The crown features a gabled front hipped roof tower.

The building was damaged on March 29, 2014, when the nearby Younkers Building burned down while in the midst of renovation. The building subsequently underwent repairs and a new building is currently being built on the former site of the Younkers Building.

== See also ==
- List of tallest buildings in Iowa
