= Equitable Building (Des Moines) =

- Equitable Life Insurance Company of Iowa Building
- U.S. National Register of Historic Places
- The Equitable Building viewed from the northeast

- Location within Iowa
- Location: 604 Locust Street; 316 6th Avenue; Des Moines, Iowa
- Coordinates: 41°35′12″N 93°37′31″W
- Built: 1924
- Architectural style: Gothic Revival
- NRHP reference No.: 15000154
- Added to NRHP: April 21, 2015

The Equitable Building is a historical skyscraper in Des Moines, Iowa, United States. It is named after the insurance company Equitable of Iowa, which originally owned the building, and is located along Locust Street in the downtown area of the city. The 19-story Equitable Building, at 604 Locust St. in Des Moines, was completed in 1924, and standing at 318 ft (97m), for 49 years was the tallest building in Iowa. It remained the tallest building in Iowa until the completion of Financial Center in 1973. The Equitable Building is now the eighth tallest building in Iowa.

The building consists of retail, office and residential spaces. Since early 2006 a developer has been working to convert much of the building to condominiums. In late 2007 the main retail tenant, Joseph's Jewelry, announced that it would relocate from the Equitable Building after 83 years to Davis Brown Tower, located at 10th St and Walnut. The move was completed in 2008.

== Asbestos abatement lawsuit ==
The Iowa Attorney General's Office filed a lawsuit May 5, 2009 alleging numerous asbestos violations from 2005 to 2008. The Attorney General's lawsuit alleged that Equitable L.P., while renovating the top 13 floors of the Equitable Building from 2005 to 2008, failed to inspect for asbestos, failed to provide notice to the Iowa Department of Natural Resources, failed to remove asbestos-containing material before renovation, failed to properly handle the asbestos-containing material disturbed during the renovation, and failed to properly dispose of the material. The first six floors were occupied during the renovation.

The lawsuit was filed after the Polk County Health Dept. forwarded an anonymous complaint about the renovation project to the DNR in the latter part of 2007, and the DNR investigated and documented numerous violations. The DNR issued an administrative order requiring Equitable L.P. to stop activities until all floors were thoroughly inspected and all asbestos-containing material was removed by a licensed asbestos-abatement contractor – but Equitable L.P. continued with renovation in violation of the order, the suit alleged. The DNR issued a second Notice of Violation to Equitable L.P. in February 2008 for failing to comply with the earlier DNR administrative order. The renovations were completed in 2008 with no additional violations reported.

On May 5, 2009, Polk County District Court Judge D.J. Stovall entered a “Consent Order, Judgment and Decree” that ordered Equitable L.P. to pay a $500,000 environmental civil penalty for conducting extensive renovations of the historic Equitable Building in downtown Des Moines without taking required precautions for the presence of asbestos-containing material. Judge Stovall also permanently prohibited any further violations.

“This is the largest civil penalty by far in Iowa for asbestos violations,” said Attorney General Tom Miller. “We alleged Equitable L.P. completely ignored asbestos-handling requirements during renovations from 2005 to 2007, until the Iowa DNR became involved.” Department of Natural Resources Director Richard Leopold said the amount of the civil penalty underscores the importance of properly handling and disposing of asbestos during renovation and demolition projects. “What’s important to remember is that asbestos poses potentially serious health implications and that we do not have a situation like this happen again,” Leopold said. “This enforcement action should serve as a warning that the regulations relating to asbestos removal and disposal will be vigorously enforced.”

In the Consent Order, Judgment and Decree entered May 5, 2009, Equitable L.P. admitted that it failed to thoroughly inspect the Equitable Building for the presence of asbestos prior to starting renovation activities, submit written notice of renovation activities to the DNR before beginning the renovation, or conduct the building renovation without taking precautions for the potential presence of asbestos-containing material.

Asbestos – which often is present in older building materials – is regulated as a hazardous air pollutant. It can cause lung disease and cancer, especially if it is contained in dust when asbestos-containing material is crumbled, pulverized or reduced to powder. State and federal laws and regulations have stringent requirements for handling regulated asbestos-containing material during demolition or renovations.

=== Ruling and aftermath ===
A federal grand jury indicted Russell Coco, the supervisor of the Equitable Building renovation, and developer Bob Knapp, owner of the building, on 11 counts, accusing them of gutting several floors of the Equitable Building while large amounts of asbestos were present, then improperly disposing of the material.

Bob Knapp pleaded guilty to two charges in February 2011 for his role at the head of a conspiracy to ignore federal asbestos regulations during a three-year renovation project at the Equitable Building. Knapp was sentenced on June 22, 2011, to 41 months behind bars.

Knapp was paroled on March 25, 2014. On March 30, 2014, Knapp was found dead in a burned out car near Panora, Iowa, after stealing it from an acquaintance in Waukee whom he had been staying with. Federal authorities had reported Knapp to have escaped home confinement.

Russell Coco also pleaded guilty in February to charges of conspiracy to impede and impair Environmental Protection Agency asbestos removal procedures and violations of the work practice requirements of the Clean Air Act. Coco was sentenced on July 13, 2011, to three years of probation for his involvement in the illegal removal of asbestos from the building.

== Ownership ==
Local developer Bob Knapp purchased the building for $5 million in 2005 using a loan from Vantus Bank. His aim was to convert some floors into upscale apartments. In March 2009 Great Southern Bank, having acquired the loan after the failure of Vantus Bank, foreclosed on the property. The Equitable Building was scheduled to be sold at auction on September 30, 2010.

The Equitable building was sold to Equitable Lofts LLC, on February 15, 2012 and has been converted into upscale apartments.

== See also ==
- Des Moines, Iowa
- List of tallest buildings in Iowa

Preceded by Iowa State Capitol	Tallest Building in Iowa; 1924—1973; 97m	Succeeded by Financial Center
