= Register and Tribune Building =

United States historic place and apartment complex

- U.S. National Register of Historic Places
- The building in 2021

- Location within Iowa Location within the United States
- Location: 715 Locust St. Des Moines, Iowa
- Coordinates: 41°35′12″N 93°37′38″W
- Area: less than one acre
- Built: 1918
- Architect: Proudfoot, Bird & Rawson; Emery, Amos B.
- NRHP reference No.: 16000385
- Added to NRHP: June 21, 2016

The Register and Tribune Building is a historic commercial building at 715 Locust Street in Des Moines, Iowa. Built in 1918, it served as home to The Des Moines Register, one of Iowa's leading newspapers, until about 2000, when the presses were moved to another building, and 2013, when the Register's owner, the Gannett Corporation, moved out in 2013. It was designed by one of Iowa's leading architectural firms, Proudfoot, Bird and Rawson, with later additions by equally prominent firms.

The building was listed on the National Register of Historic Places in 2016. In 2017, the building was converted into an apartment complex.

== See also ==
- National Register of Historic Places listings in Des Moines, Iowa
