= Hippee Building =

- U.S. National Register of Historic Places
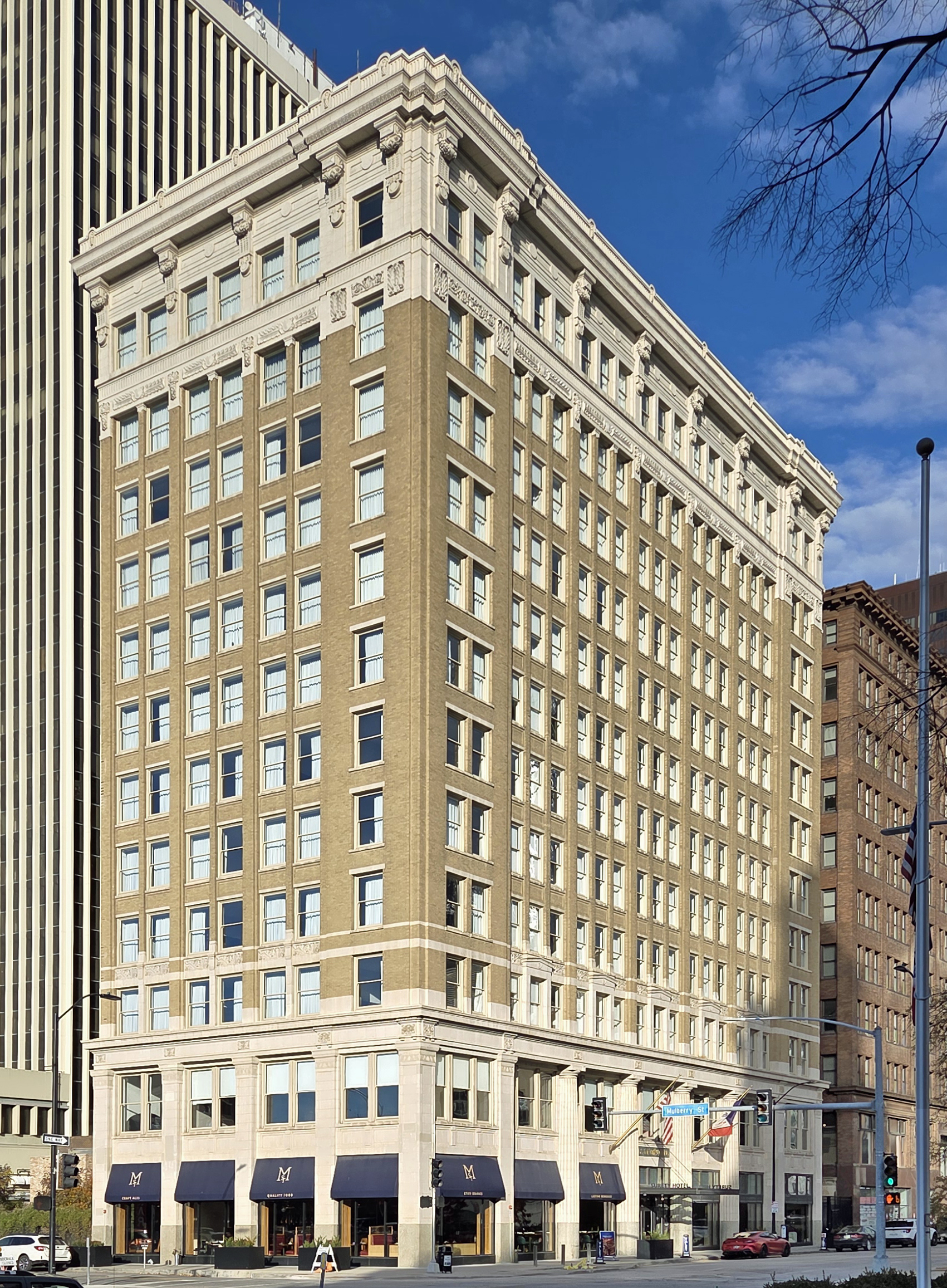
- The Hippee Building viewed from the southeast

- Location within Iowa Location within the United States
- Location: 206 6th Avenue, Des Moines, Iowa
- Coordinates: 41°35′07″N 93°37′28.5″W
- Area: less than one acre
- Built: 1913
- Architect: Sawyer and Watrous
- Architectural style: Early Commercial
- NRHP reference No.: 100002325
- Added to NRHP: April 17, 2018

The Hippee Building, also known as the Southern Surety Building, the Savings and Loan Building, and the Midland Building, is a historic building located in downtown Des Moines, Iowa, United States. It was completed in 1913 by George B. Hippee, whose father George M. Hippee was one of the first merchants in Des Moines. George B. developed the first interurban railway in the city and it connected Des Moines to other communities in central Iowa. The 172-foot (52 m), 12-story structure was designed by the Des Moines architectural firm of Sawyer and Watrous in the Early Commercial style. At the time of it completion, the building was Iowa's tallest skyscraper. It was used as an office building until the Aparium Hotel Group of Chicago acquired it in 2017 and began converting the building into a 138-room hotel. It was listed on the National Register of Historic Places in 2018.
