= Wells Fargo History Museum =

Museum in California, United States

Coordinates: 33.4491°N 112.0759°W

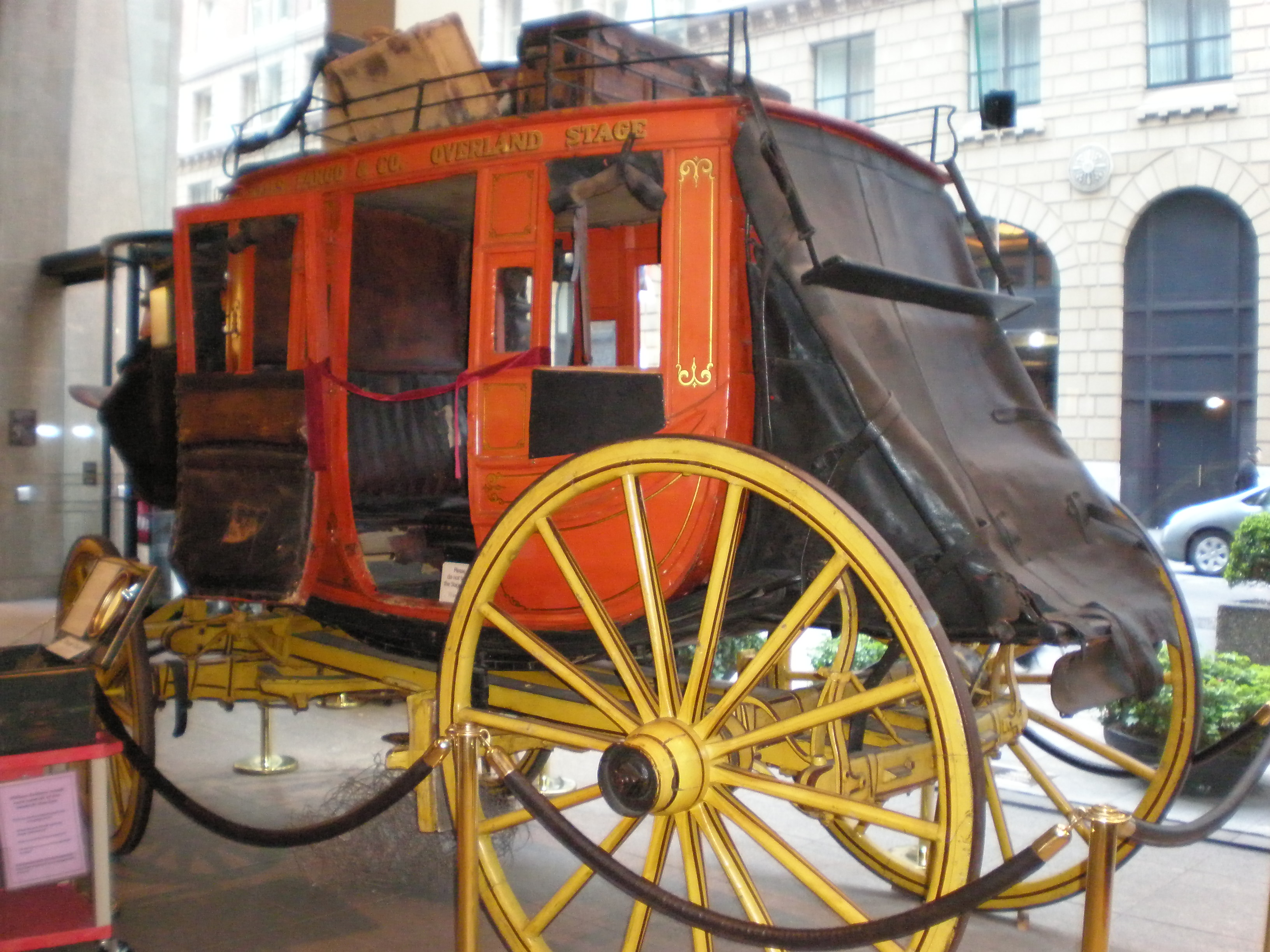
- Concord stagecoach at the San Francisco location of the Wells Fargo History Museum
- Established: 1935
- Dissolved: February 28, 2025
- Type: Corporate history museum
- Owner: Wells Fargo

The Wells Fargo History Museum was a franchise of museums operated by Wells Fargo with its main and last museum located in its corporate headquarters in San Francisco, California. They featured exhibits about the company's history. Some of the museums' displays include original stagecoaches, photographs, gold nuggets and mining artifacts, the Pony Express, telegraphs and historic bank artifacts. The museum was initially known as the Wells Fargo History Room when it opened in 1927 in San Francisco. In 1935 a museum was opened for public tours. The museum, which occupied two stories of the company's longtime headquarters, had been operating for nearly 60 years at that current location.

Until 2020, when eleven of the museums were closed by Wells Fargo, it was a group of twelve museums operated in multiple cities in the United States. The last museum at its main headquarters in San Francisco was closed February 28, 2025.

== Exhibits ==
The museums at its headquarters housed a diverse collection of artifacts and exhibits that chronicling Wells Fargo's evolution. Visitors could climb aboard genuine Wells Fargo stagecoaches. The museum also showcased tools for gold mining, clothing, and household items from the Gold Rush period, as well as samples of gold nuggets from various deposits. Additionally, exhibits included models of 19th and 20th-century bank safes, working equipment, and samples of historical bank documents. Visitors could also examine items like the "dotchin," a portable scale used by Chinese miners to measure gold, and view enlarged sections of Eadward Muybridge's 1877 panorama of San Francisco's skyline.

== Museum closures ==
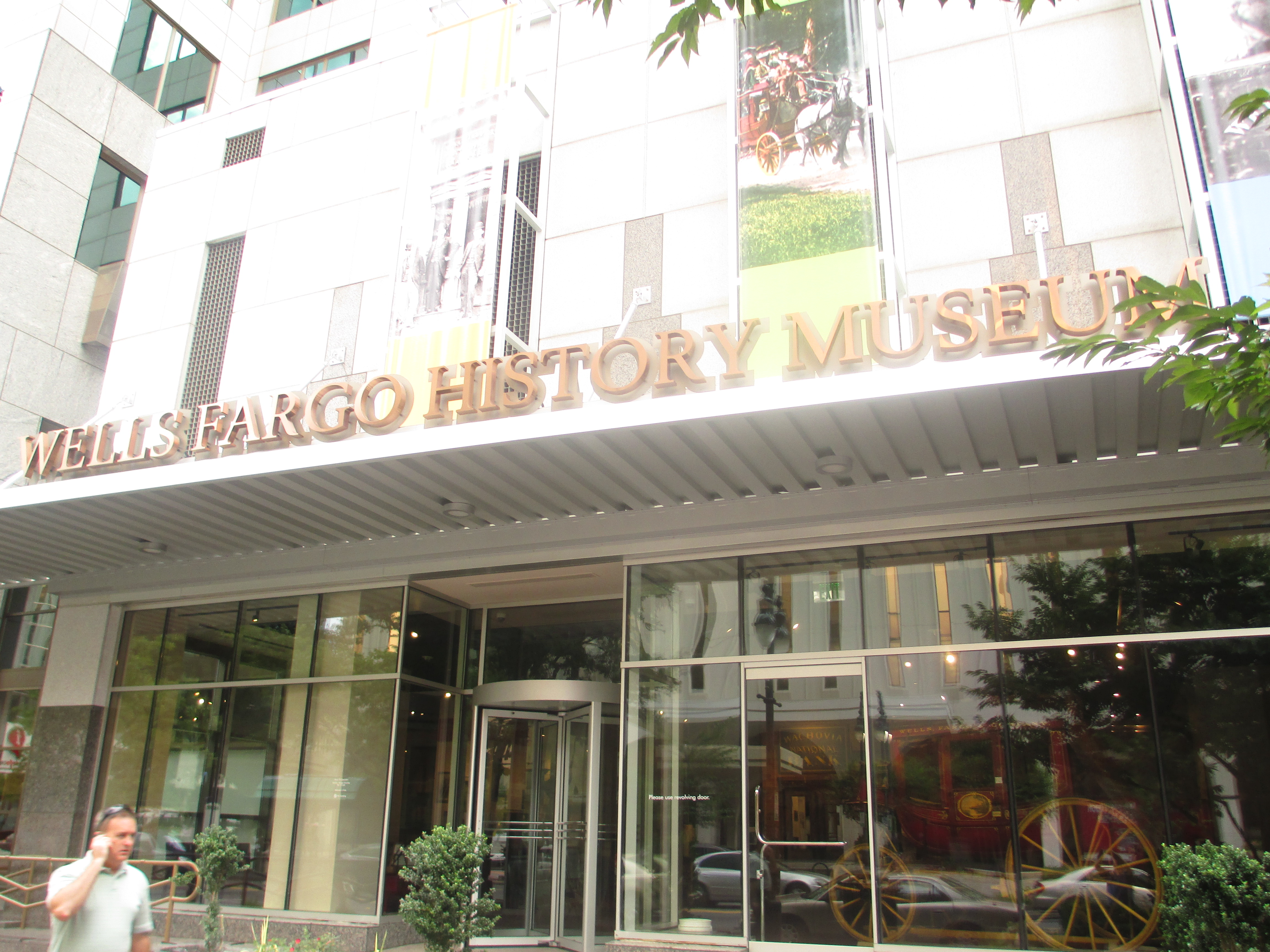
Closed Wells Fargo History Museum in Charlotte, NC

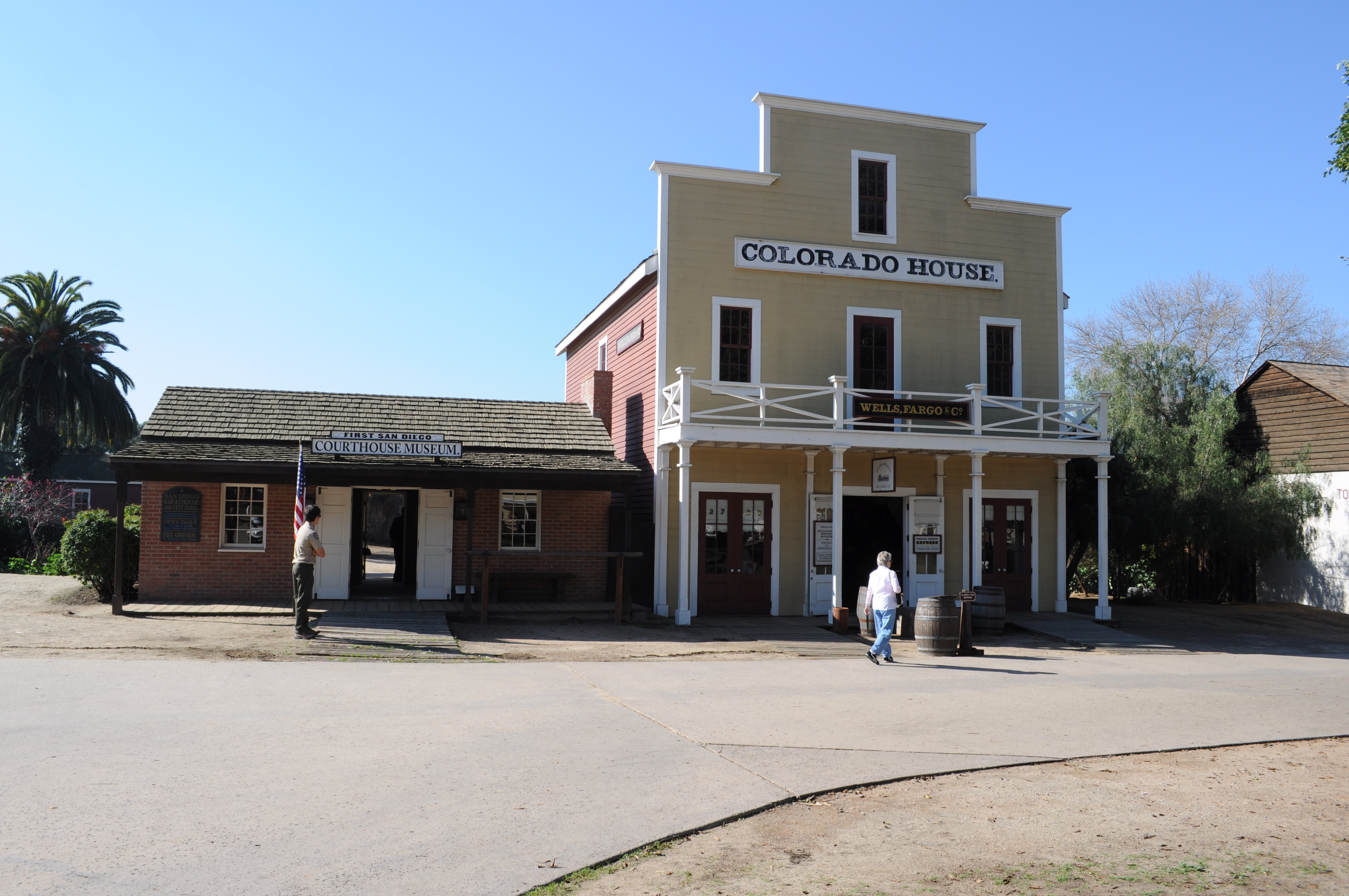
Closed Wells Fargo History Museum in Old Town San Diego, CA

In 2020 Wells Fargo announced it would be permanently closing all but one of its museums announcing that the "museums do not align with our go-forward strategy as a company." and that "After evaluating our business and community strategies, we have decided to consolidate the program to focus on our San Francisco museum location and close the remaining 11 museum locations over the next 12 months." The Wells Fargo History Museum in its corporate headquarters of San Francisco, California was the only museum to remain open.

=== San Francisco museum closure ===
In December 2024, Wells Fargo announced plans to relocate its corporate headquarters from 420 Montgomery St. to 333 Market St., a move that would result in the closure of the Wells Fargo History Museum. The museum was scheduled to close by the end of the first quarter of 2025. The museum's final day of operation was February 28, 2025. The fate of the museum's extensive collection remains uncertain, with the company stating that additional information will be provided in the coming months.

== Closed museum locations ==
- Financial Center in downtown Des Moines, Iowa
- Three Wells Fargo Center in Charlotte, North Carolina
- Wells Fargo Center in downtown Los Angeles, California
- Wells Fargo Center in Minneapolis, Minnesota
- Wells Fargo Building in Philadelphia, Pennsylvania
- Wells Fargo Museum (Phoenix) at Wells Fargo Plaza in Phoenix, Arizona
- Wells Fargo Center in Portland, Oregon
- Wells Fargo Center in Sacramento, California
- Alaska Heritage Museum in Anchorage, Alaska, which featured a large collection of Alaskan Native artifacts, ivory carvings and baskets, fine art by Alaskan artists, and displays about Wells Fargo history in the Alaskan Gold Rush era.
- Wells Fargo History Museum in the Pony Express Terminal in Old Sacramento State Historic Park, which was the company's second office
- Wells Fargo History Museum in Old Town San Diego State Historic Park
- Wells Fargo History Museum at 44 Montgomery, San Francisco, California

== Gallery ==
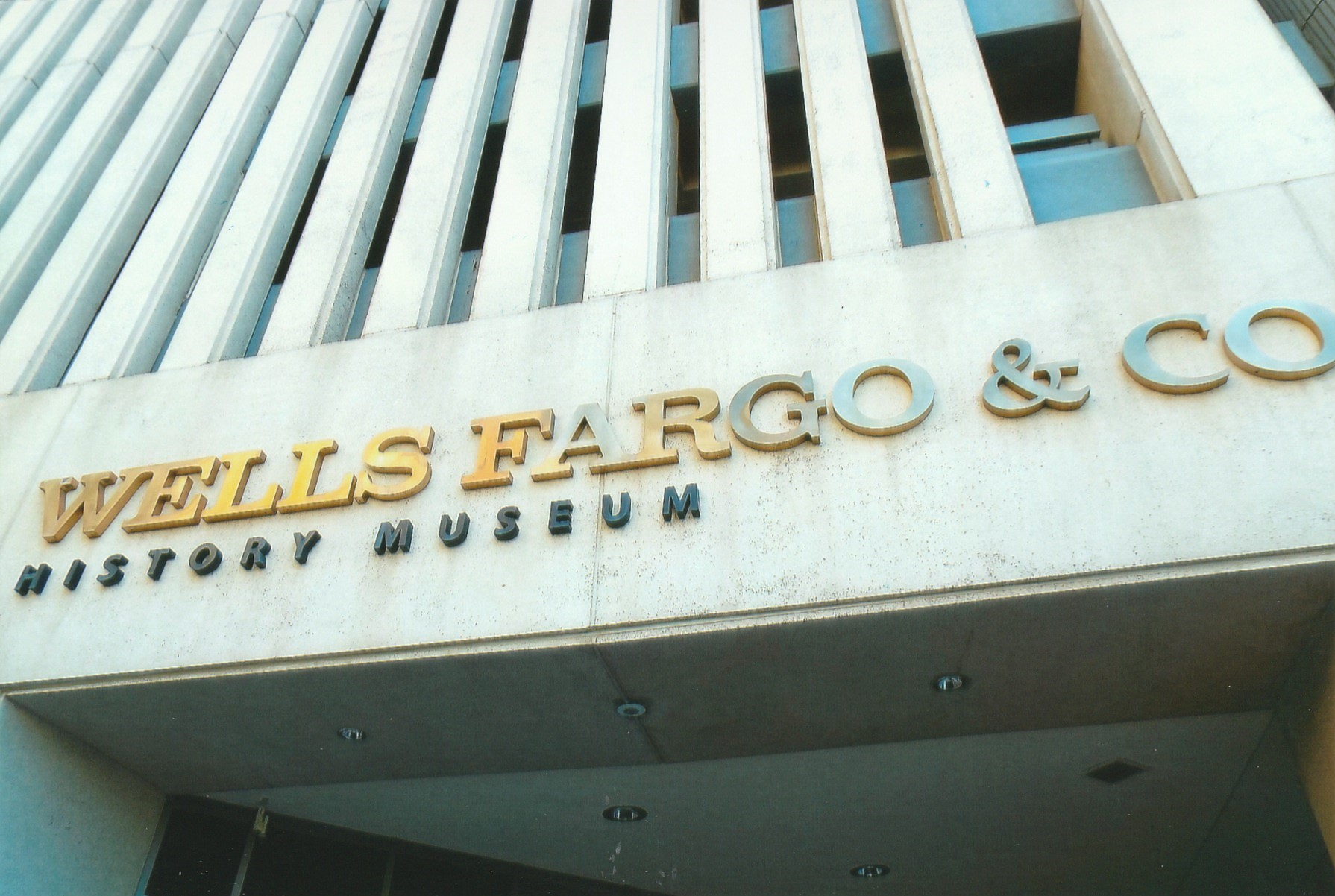
Wells Fargo Museum in Phoenix, AZ

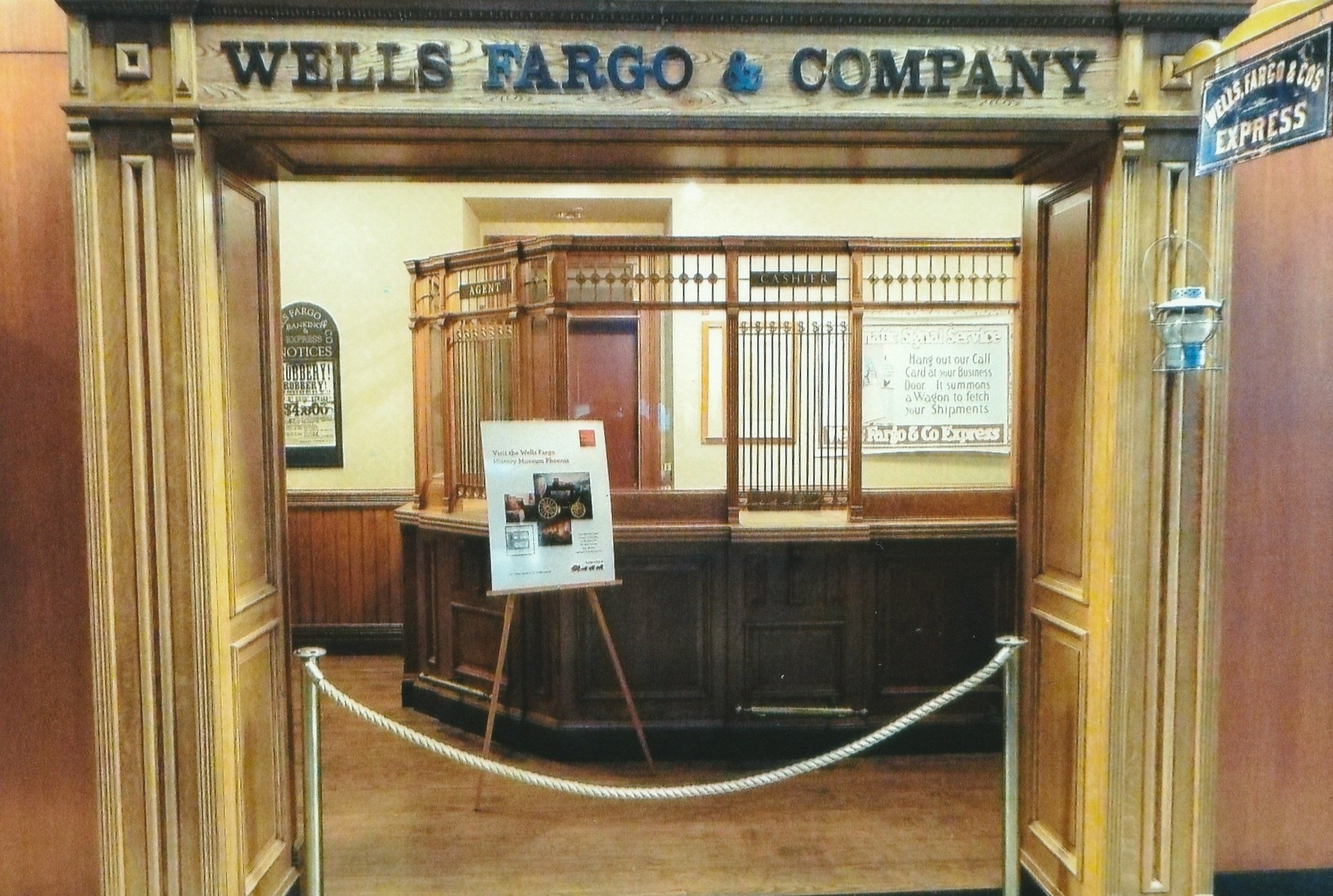
Recreation of a 1920 Wells Fargo Bank

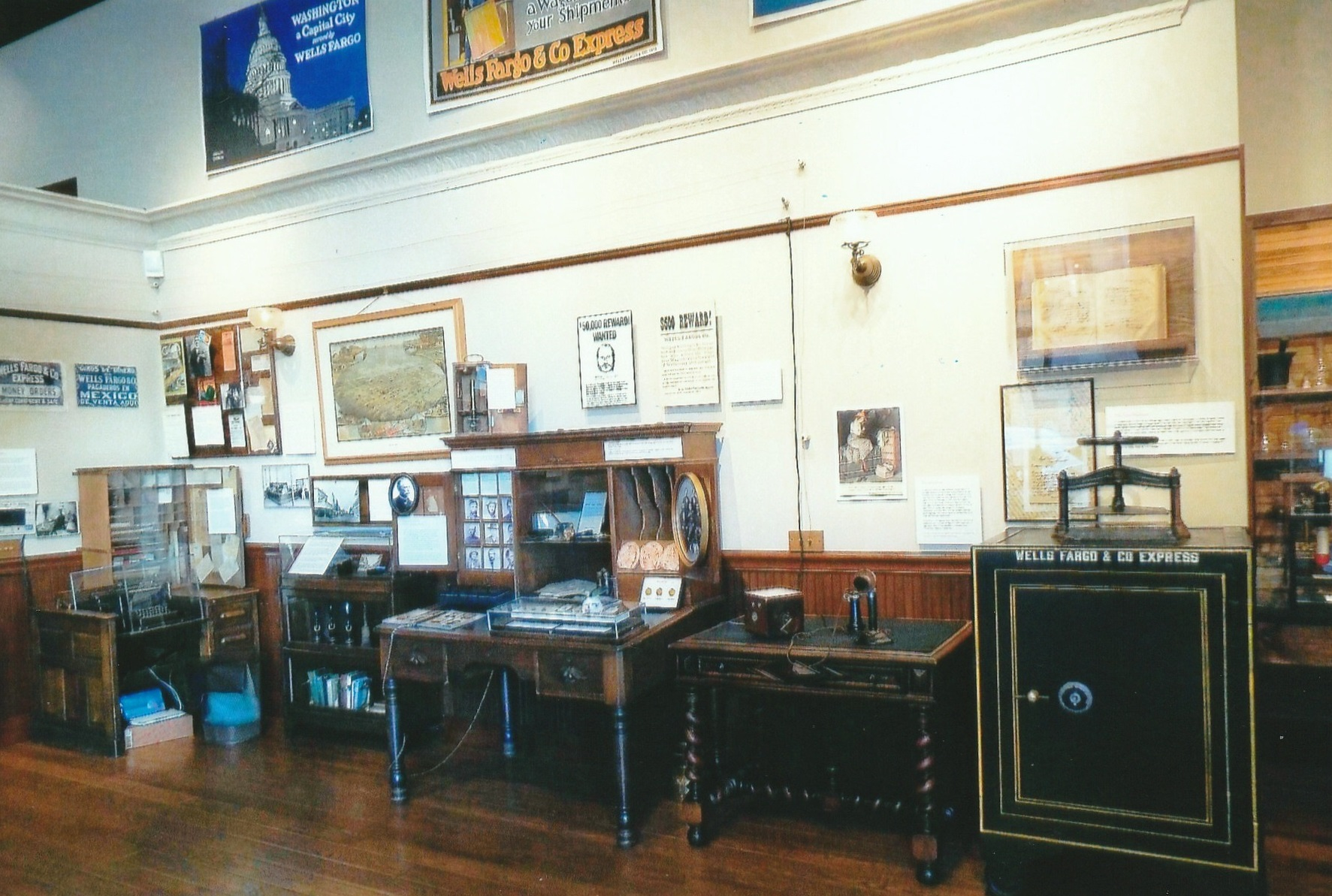
Display at the Phoenix Wells Fargo Museum

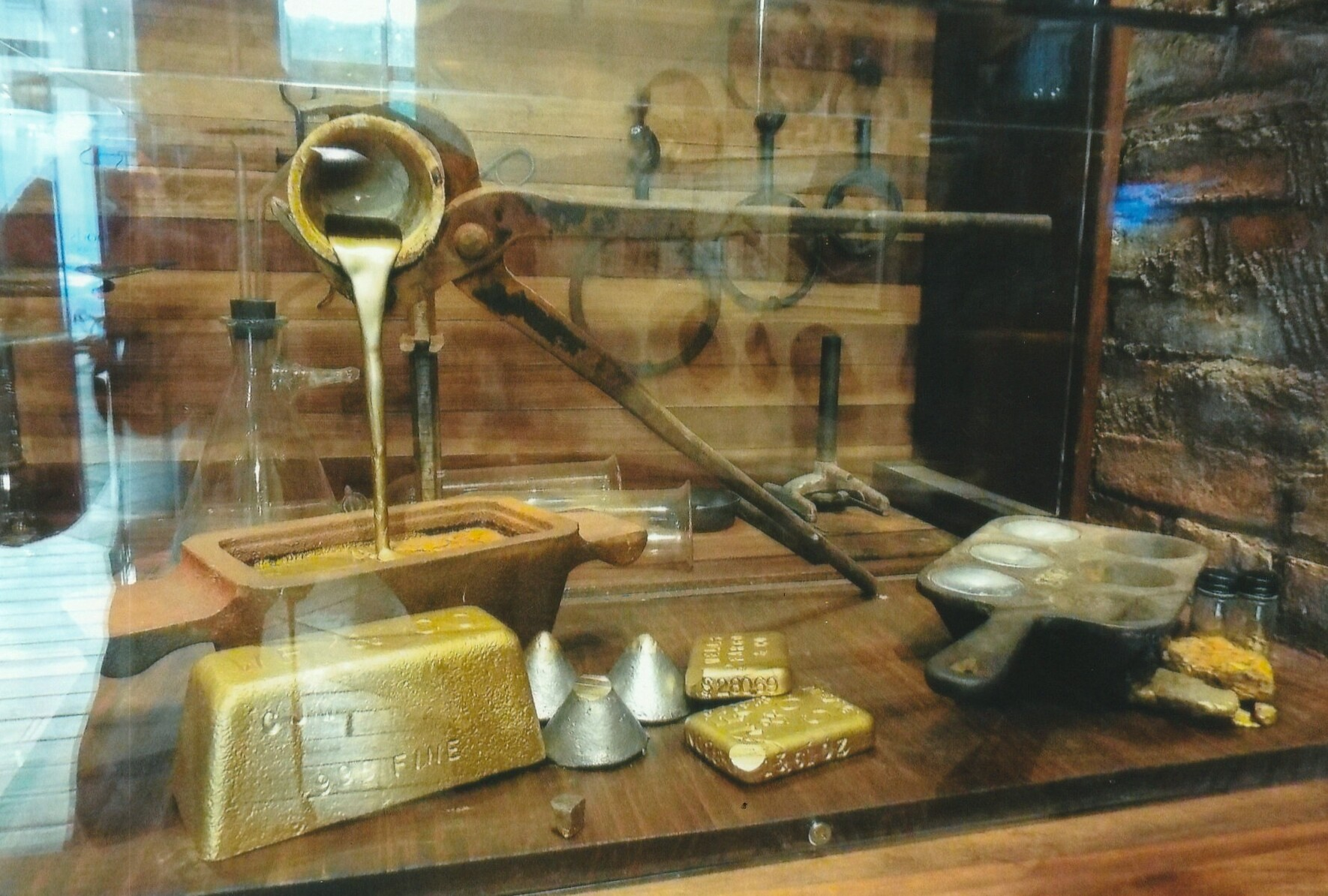
Gold exhibit

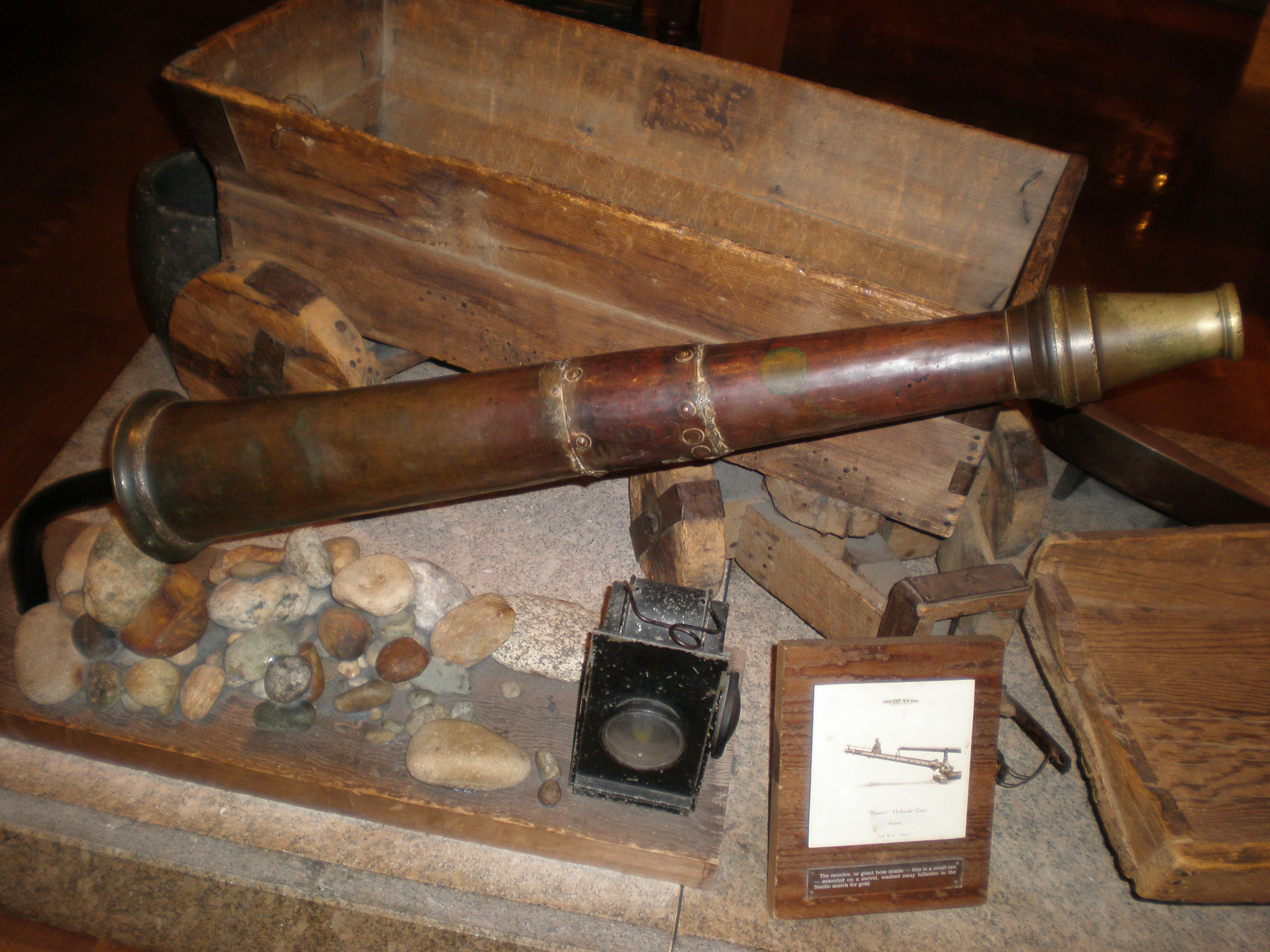
Monitor & mining equipment

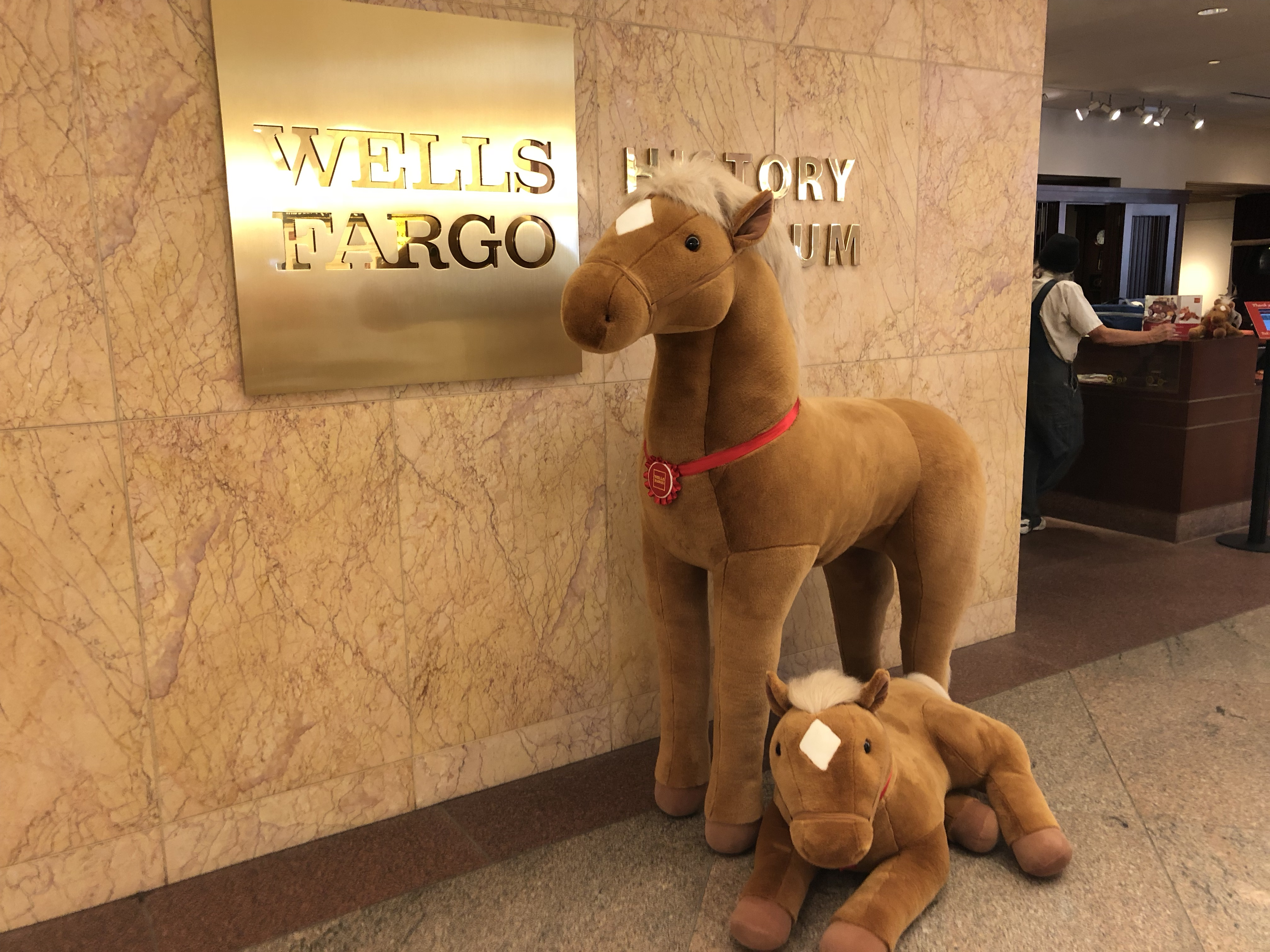
Wells Fargo History Museum in Minneapolis, MN
