= List of sports teams in Des Moines, Iowa =

== Teams that have played in Des Moines, Iowa ==
- Des Moines, Western Association (19th century)
- Des Moines Hawkeyes, Western League (1900)
- Des Moines Millers, Western League (1901)
- Des Moines Midgets, Western League (1902)
- Des Moines Undertakers, Western League (1903)
- Des Moines Prohibitionists, Western League (1904)
- Des Moines Underwriters, Western League (1905)
- Des Moines Champs, Western League (1906–1907)
- Des Moines Boosters, Western League (1908–1924)
- All Nations, Negro leagues (1912–1918)
- Des Moines Demons, Western League (1925–1937)
- Des Moines Bruins, Western League (1947–1958)
- Des Moines Demons, Three-I League (1959–1961)
- Des Moines Oak Leafs, United States Hockey League (1961–1963), International Hockey League (1963–1972)
- Des Moines Capitols, International Hockey League (1972–1975)
- Iowa Cubs, American Association (1969–1997), Pacific Coast League (1998–2020), International League (2021-present)
- Des Moines Buccaneers, United States Hockey League (1980–present)
- Des Moines Menace, USL League Two (1994–present)
- Iowa Barnstormers, Arena Football League (1995–2000, 2010–2014), af2 (2001, 2008–2009), Indoor Football League (2015–present)
- Des Moines Dragons, International Basketball Association (1997–2001)
- Iowa Stars, aka Iowa Chops, American Hockey League, (2005–2009)
- Des Moines Heat, International Basketball League, 2005
- Iowa Wolves, NBA G League (2007–present)
- Des Moines Derby Dames, Women's Flat Track Derby Association (2009–present)
- Iowa Wild, American Hockey League, (2013–present)
- Des Moines United FC, United Premier Soccer League (2021–2022), National Premier Soccer League (2023–present)
