= Hubbell Building (Des Moines, Iowa) =

- U.S. National Register of Historic Places
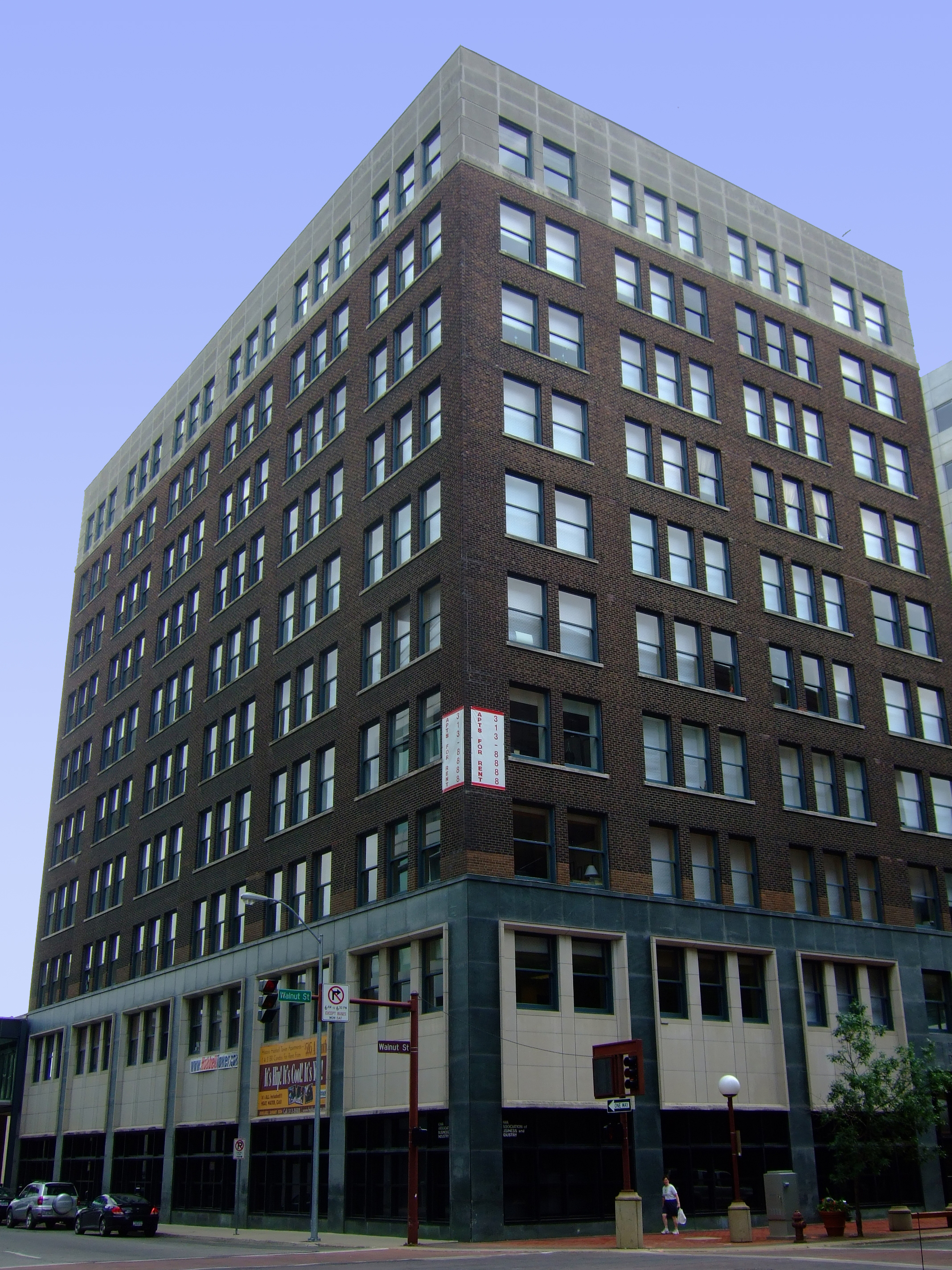

- Location within Iowa Location within the United States
- Location: 904 Walnut St. Des Moines, Iowa
- Coordinates: 41°35′5.3″N 93°37′42.4″W
- Area: less than one acre
- Built: 1913
- Architect: Proudfoot, Bird & Rawson
- Architectural style: Chicago School
- NRHP reference No.: 04000818
- Added to NRHP: August 11, 2004

The Hubbell Building is a historic building located in downtown Des Moines, Iowa, United States. It was listed on the National Register of Historic Places in 2004. It has been featured on the Discovery Channel show Dirty Jobs.

== Architecture ==
The building is a steel framed structure covered in brick. It is a ten-story building that rises 151 feet (46 m) above the ground. The building was designed by the Des Moines architectural firm of Proudfoot, Bird & Rawson and completed in 1913. F. M. Hubbell, Son, & Company, Inc., a real estate firm established in 1887, had the building constructed. Their corporate headquarters that oversaw their various companies was located here. Most of the building was rented out to other firms. It was designed by the prominent Des Moines architectural firm of Proudfoot, Bird & Rawson. Originally, the building had a more ornate appearance, but in the late 1940s part of the cornice fell onto sidewalk prompting its removal in 1948. It was replaced them with smooth concrete panels. The Des Moines architectural firm Brooks Borg, who designed that project also designed the simplification of the building's storefront level in 1950. In the later project, panels of dark green stone replaced terracotta pilasters, and cast concrete panels replaced terracotta window surrounds on the second floor and glass transoms on the first floor. The building was connected to the Des Moines skywalk system in 2002.
