= Des Moines Area Regional Transit =

Public transportation service in Iowa, US

Des Moines Area Regional Transit Authority

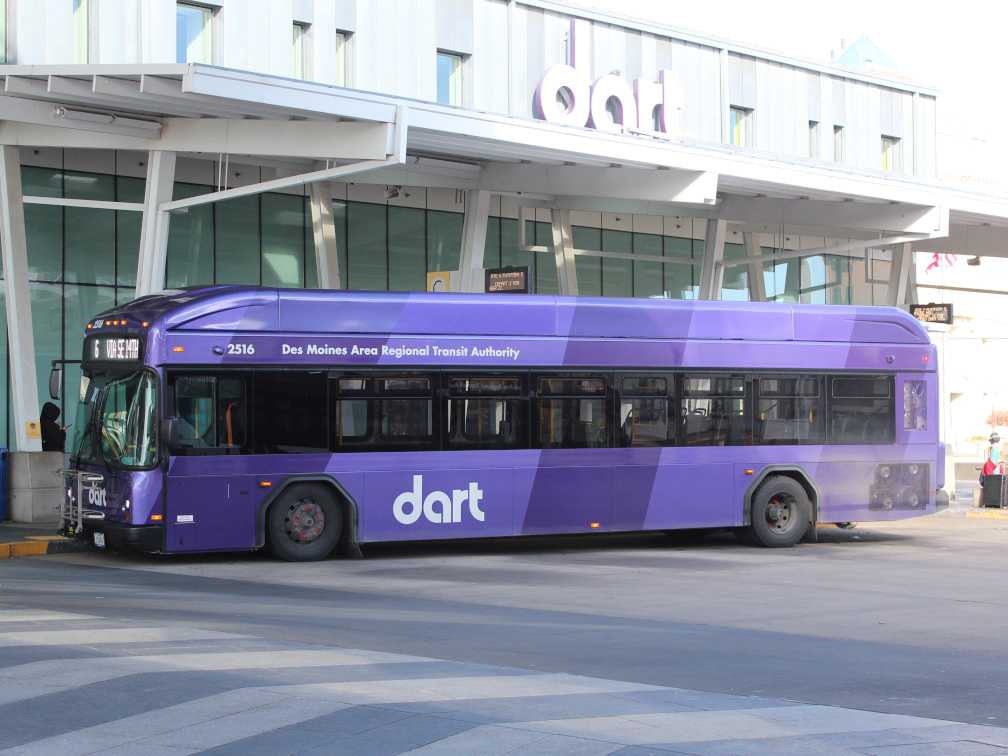
- A DART Gillig Low Floor bus at DART Central Station.
- Founded: 1973 (as Des Moines MTA); 2006 (as DART)
- Headquarters: 620 Cherry St, Des Moines, Iowa 50309
- Locale: Des Moines, Iowa, United States
- Service area: Des Moines and surrounding communities in Polk County
- Service type: Bus service, Express bus service, Paratransit, On Demand, Vanpool
- Routes: 11
- Hubs: 1 (DART Central Station)
- Fleet: 124 (85 Fixed Route buses & 39 On Call/Paratransit buses)
- Daily ridership: 10,808 Boardings per Weekday (2023)
- Annual ridership: 3.22 million (FY2023)
- Fuel type: Diesel
- Chief executive: Elizabeth Presutti
- Website: ridedart.com

Des Moines Area Regional Transit Authority (DART) is an American mass transit service that operates in the Greater Des Moines area. It is the largest public transit agency operating in the state of Iowa.

== History ==
DART was founded in 1973 as the Des Moines Metropolitan Transit Authority, commonly known as the MTA. Formed by a partnership of the cities of Des Moines, West Des Moines, Clive, Windsor Heights, and Urbandale. The MTA eventually developed a 14-county carpool and vanpool system in addition to its bus system.

By 2006, population growth in varying regions of central Iowa led to Polk County and nineteen cities forming a regional transportation agency following changes to Iowa law in 2005.

Sunday service was added for the first time in 2007. In 2008, a free shuttle linked downtown Des Moines with the Iowa State Capitol.

DART has offered a Park & Ride service during the Iowa State Fair since 2006.

Free wifi connectivity began to be offered on all buses in 2018. This was implemented at the same time new fareboxes were installed, which required an internet connection.

DART began a pilot electric bus program in October 2020, starting with seven Proterra Catalyst buses on route 60 (Ingersoll/University). The pilot program was funded by a grant from the Federal Transit Administration, with a local match from MidAmerican Energy. Due to numerous issues with the buses, including suspension and weatherproofing issues, all seven buses were sidelined in fall 2022 shortly before their major manufacturer warranties expired. Despite attempts from Proterra technicians to address the issues, they were never fully resolved, and the buses were retired from the DART fleet in early 2025.

DART is represented by a board of 12 Commissioners, one from each member government it serves. DART serves Altoona, Ankeny, Bondurant, Clive, Des Moines, Grimes, Johnston, Pleasant Hill, Urbandale, West Des Moines, Windsor Heights, and greater Polk County.

In 2023, the system received 10,808 boardings on weekdays, 5,237 on Saturdays, and 3,335 on Sundays

In December 2025, DART announced the first major redesign of the bus route network in over a decade. The redesign, named Reimagine DART, reduced the number of routes from 27 to 11. Peak-only weekday express routes were eliminated, and most routes in the new network operate seven days a week. The new routes prioritize faster and more reliable service, with most routes having 15- to 30-minute intervals. The new network also features three microtransit zones in Altoona, Ankeny, and Clive-Urbandale. The new routes began service on June 14, 2026.

== Structure ==
DART utilizes a hub and spoke system, designed to favor commuters, as opposed to a point-to-point system. The network was redesigned in 2012 to utilize the new DART Central Station, which most local and express routes terminate at or pass through. A secondary hub around Valley West Mall connects multiple western routes. A northern crosstown route 50 (Euclid/Douglas Crosstown) was added in 2018.

DART also has on-call routes that operate within specific zones in the Greater Des Moines area.

== DART Central Station ==
Located at 620 Cherry Street in downtown Des Moines, DART Central station serves as the primary hub of the DART system. The $21 million bus transfer station opened in November 2012 on the south end of downtown, ending decades of using Walnut Street as a transit mall. DART Central Station has been certified LEED Platinum, the highest certification of the LEED (Leadership in Energy and Environmental Design) Rating System of the US Green Building Council. The site was selected in part due to proximity of the historic Rock Island Railroad depot, which is hoped to have passenger rail service in the future. It was designed by Substance Architecture, built by Weitz Construction, and contains both a bicycle storage room and a cafe.

== Routes ==
DART operates eleven bus routes, most of which originate and terminate at DART Central Station. Cities served include Altoona, Ankeny, Clive, Des Moines, Johnston, Urbandale, West Des Moines, and Windsor Heights. The eleven routes, along with their variants, are listed in the table below.

№	Name	Notes
2	MLK Jr. Pkwy	
3	University Ave	3L variant serves Jordan Creek Town Center.
3L	University Ave	3L variant serves Jordan Creek Town Center.
4	Crosstown	Operates both clockwise and counterclockwise.
5	Merle Hay Rd	
6	SE 14th St	
7	SW 9th St	
8	Watrous Ave	
9	6th Ave	9L variant serves Ankeny.
9L	6th Ave	9L variant serves Ankeny.
11	Hubbell Ave	
12	Easton Blvd	
20	Mills Civic Pkwy	

== Fares and Passes ==
=== Fares ===
The following fares are charged on the various services DART operates:

Type	Adult	Half Fare	Full Fare Token	Half Fare Token	Children 6–10	Children 5 and Under
Local Fares	$1.75	$0.75	Token (10/$17.50)	Token (10/$7.50)	$0.75	Free
Express Fares	$2.00	$0.75	Token (10/$17.50) + $0.25	Token (10/$7.50)	$0.75	Free
On Call Fares	$3.50	$0.75	2 Tokens (10/$17.50)	Token (10/$7.50)	$0.75	Free
Shuttle Fares	Free					

=== Unlimited Ride Passes ===
Type	Price	Half Fare Price
Weekly	$16.00	$7.00
Monthly	$48.00	$24.00
Monthly Express Plus	$58.00	$29.00
Day Pass	$4.00	

== Fleet ==
DART's fleet primarily consists of 40-foot heavy-duty transit buses, most of which are manufactured by New Flyer and previously by Orion Bus Industries. There are also a handful of 29-foot Gillig buses that are most commonly used for lower-ridership routes. The fleet also includes various minibuses used for On-Demand and Paratransit services. The current DART fleet can be referenced in the table below.

Fleet number(s)	Photo	Model Year	Manufacturer	Model	Notes
1001-1020		2010	Orion Bus Industries	Orion VII NG	Currently being retired.
1023-1027		2012	Orion Bus Industries	Orion VII EPA10	Currently being retired.
1411-1416		2014	New Flyer	XD40	Entered service in September–October 2014, replacing six older buses.
1607-1633		2016	New Flyer	XD40	1610 and 1622 are retired due to various accidents.
1701-1706		2017	Freightliner Champion Defender	M2	Used for On-Demand and Paratransit service.
1801-1806		2018	Freightliner Champion Defender	M2	Used for On-Demand and Paratransit service.
1807-1810		2018	New Flyer	XD35	
1811-1813		2018	New Flyer	XD40	
1901-1906		2019	Freightliner Champion Defender	M2	Used for On-Demand and Paratransit service.
2008-2012		2020	Gillig	Low Floor Plus 29'	
2013-2017		2021	New Flyer	XD40	
2101-2105		2021	Gillig	Low Floor Plus 29'	2104 is retired following a fire.
2106-2115		2022	New Flyer	XD40	
2301-2304		2023	Gillig	Low Floor Plus 29'	
2305-2311		2023	Ram	ProMaster Frontrunner; LFXLT	Used for On-Demand and Paratransit service.
2401-2405		2024	Ram	ProMaster Frontrunner; LFXLT	Used for On-Demand and Paratransit service.
2501-2505		2025	Ram	ProMaster Frontrunner; LFXLT	Used for On-Demand and Paratransit service.
2506-2509		2025	Gillig	Low Floor Plus 29'	
2510-2519		2025	Gillig	Low Floor Plus 40'	
2601-2604		2026	Ram	ProMaster Frontrunner; LFXLT	Used for On-Demand and Paratransit service.

== Fixed Route Ridership ==
The ridership and service statistics shown here are of fixed route services only and do not include demand response. Per capita statistics are based on the Des Moines urbanized area as reported in NTD data.

Year	Ridership	Change	Ridership per capita
2013	4,185,756	▲2.24%	9.3
2014	4,388,019	▲4.83%	9.75
2015	4,413,233	▲0.57%	9.81
2016	4,359,827	▼1.21%	9.69
2017	4,239,530	▼2.76%	9.42
2018	4,163,656	▼1.79%	9.25
2019	4,061,258	▼2.46%	9.02
2020	2,132,628	▼47.49%	4.04
2021	2,207,078	▲3.49%	4.18
2022	2,754,733	▲24.81%	5.22
2023	3,222,226	▲16.97%	6.11

== Gallery ==
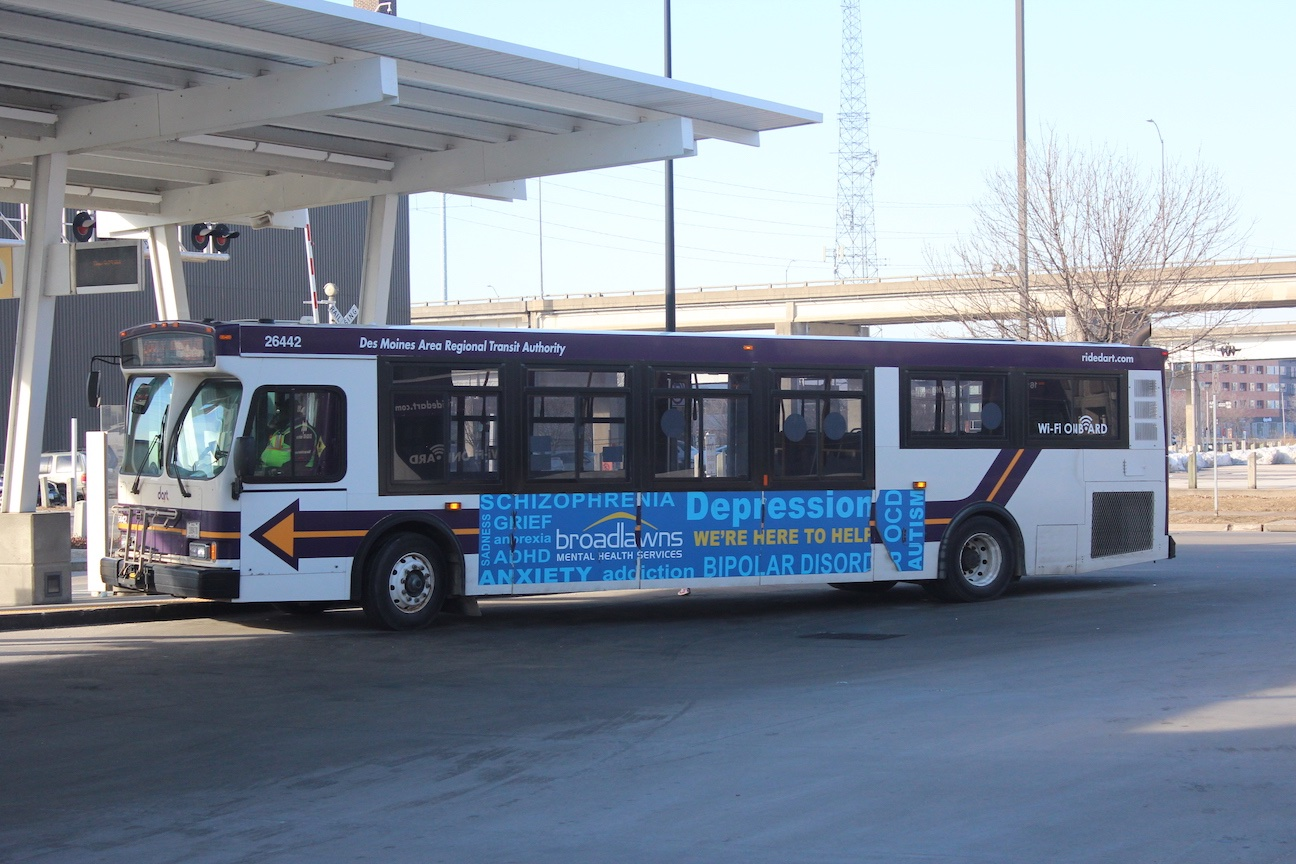
2006 Orion VII

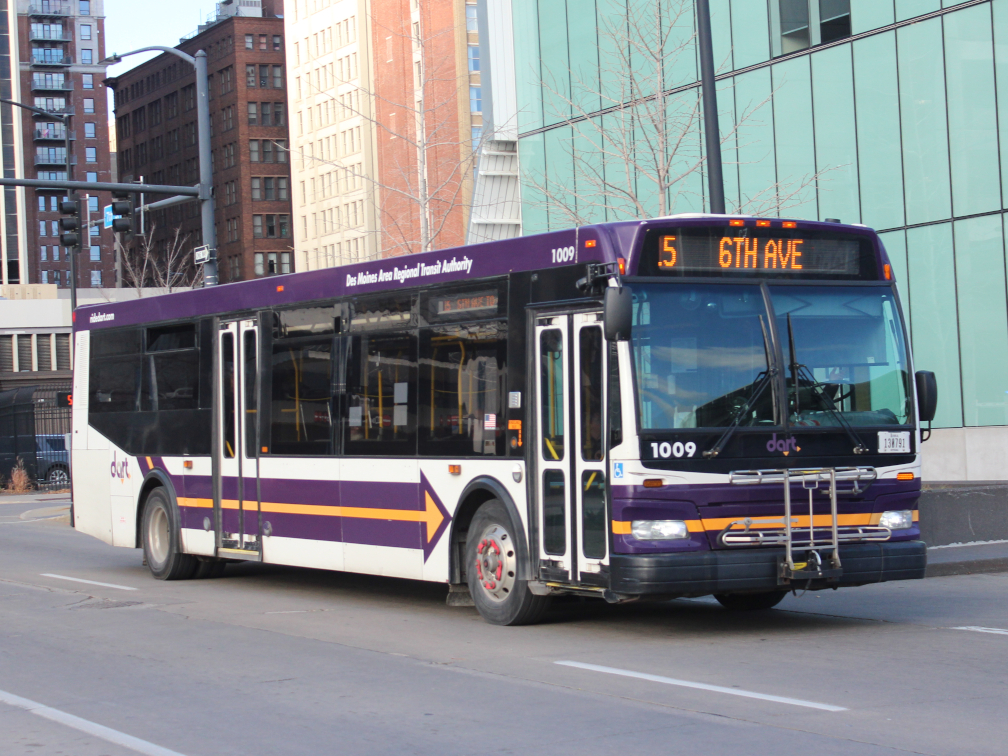
2010 Orion VII NG

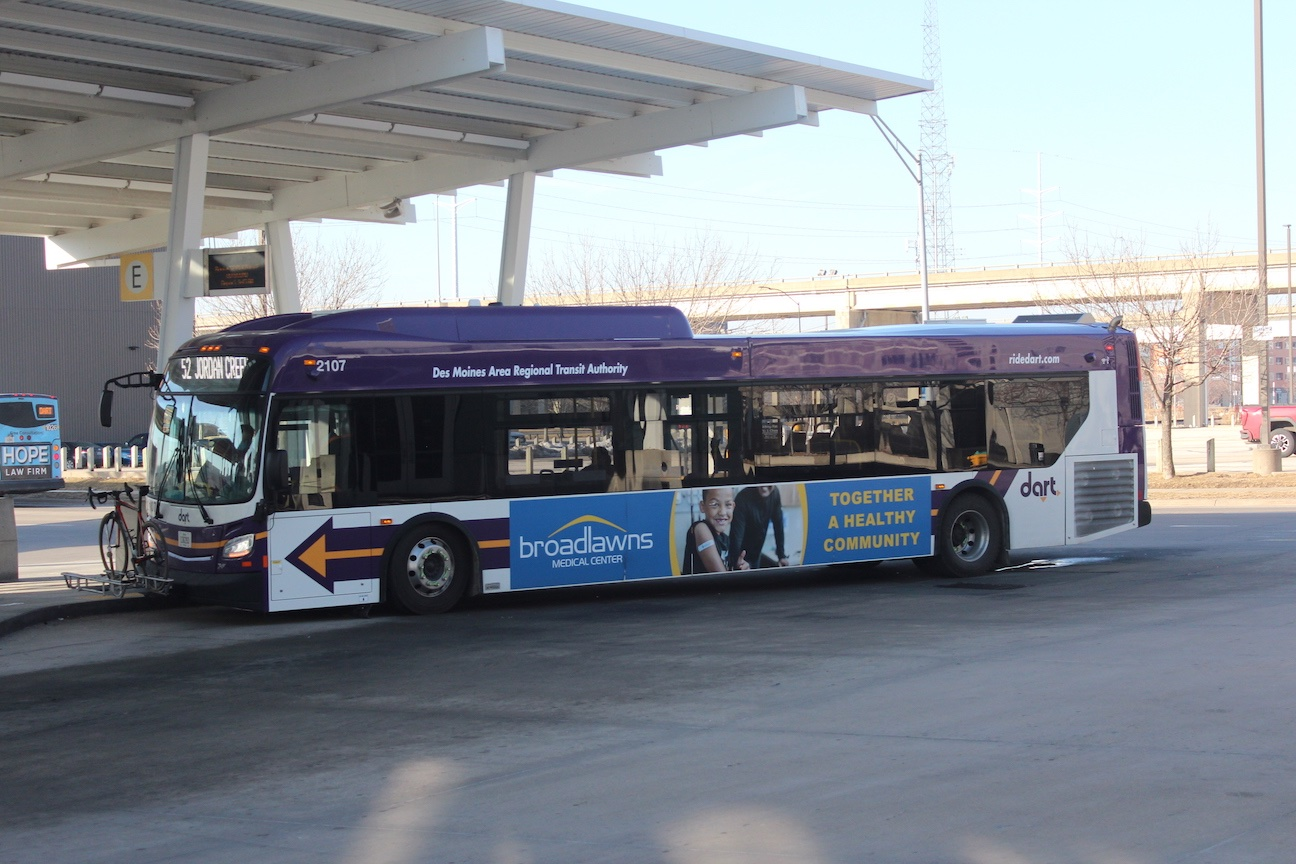
2022 New Flyer XD40

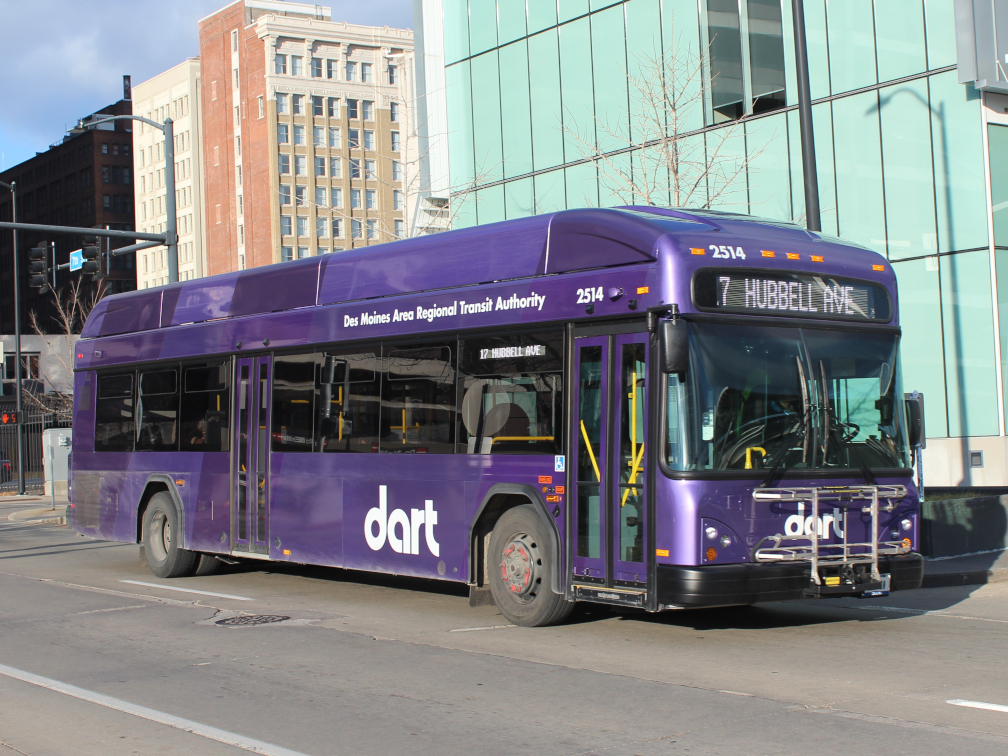
2025 Gillig Low Floor Plus 40'

== See also ==
- List of bus transit systems in the United States
