= Early skyscrapers =

Tall commercial buildings built between 1884 and 1945

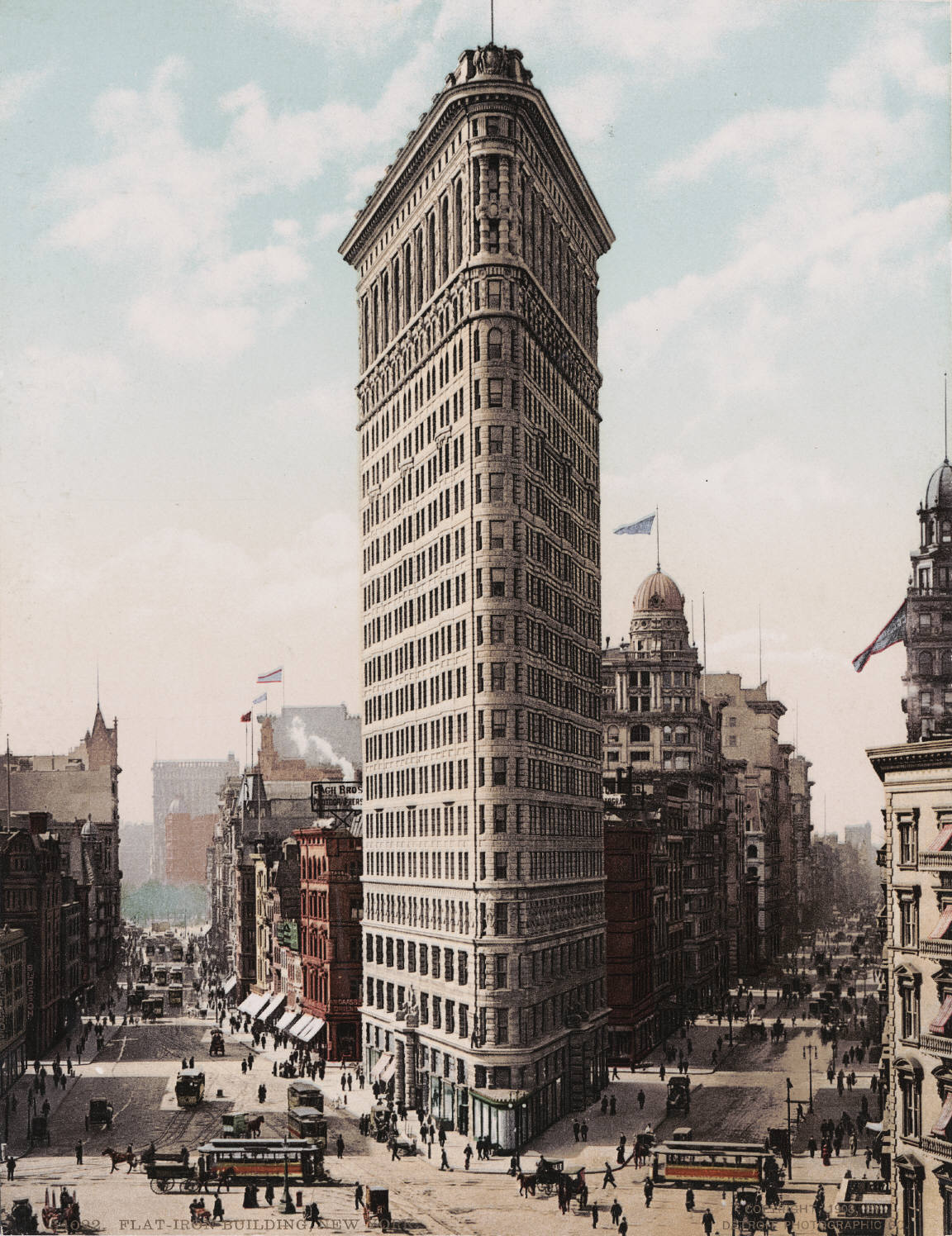
The Flatiron Building, New York City, shortly after its construction in 1903

The earliest stage of skyscraper design encompasses buildings built between 1884 and 1945, predominantly in American cities, especially New York and Chicago. Cities in the United States were traditionally made up of low-rise buildings, but significant economic growth after the American Civil War and increasingly intensive use of urban land encouraged the development of taller buildings beginning in the 1870s. Technological improvements enabled the construction of fireproofed iron-framed structures with deep foundations, equipped with new inventions such as the elevator and electric lighting. These made it both technically and commercially viable to build a new class of taller buildings; the first of these, Chicago's 138-foot-tall (42 m) Home Insurance Building, opened in 1885. Their numbers grew rapidly, and by 1888 they were being labelled "skyscrapers".

Chicago initially led the way in skyscraper design, with many constructed in the center of its financial district during the late 1880s and early 1890s. Sometimes termed the products of the Chicago school of architecture, these skyscrapers attempted to balance aesthetic concerns with practical commercial design, producing large, square palazzo-styled buildings hosting shops and restaurants on the ground level and containing rentable offices on the upper floors. In contrast, New York's skyscrapers were frequently narrower towers which, more eclectic in style, were often criticized for their lack of elegance. In 1892, Chicago banned the construction of new skyscrapers taller than 150 feet (46 m), leaving the development of taller buildings to New York.

A new wave of skyscraper construction emerged in the first decade of the 20th century. The demand for new office space to hold the expanding workforce of white-collar staff in the U.S. continued to grow. Engineering developments made it easier to build and live in yet taller buildings. Chicago built new skyscrapers in its existing style, while New York experimented further with tower design. Iconic buildings such as the Flatiron were followed by the 612-foot (187 m) tall Singer Tower, the 700-foot (210 m) Metropolitan Life Insurance Company Tower, and the 792-foot (241 m) Woolworth Building. Though these skyscrapers were commercial successes, criticism mounted as they broke up the ordered city skyline and plunged neighboring streets and buildings into perpetual shadow. Combined with an economic downturn, this led to the introduction of zoning restraints in New York in 1916.

In the interwar years, skyscrapers spread to nearly all major U.S. cities, while a total of around 100 were built in some other Western countries (like Argentina, Brazil, Germany, Italy, Poland, Spain, United Kingdom etc.) and Asian countries (China, Japan). The economic boom of the 1920s and extensive real estate speculation encouraged a wave of new skyscraper projects in New York and Chicago. New York City's 1916 Zoning Resolution helped shape the Art Deco or "set-back" style of skyscrapers, leading to structures that focused on volume and striking silhouettes, often richly decorated. Skyscraper heights continued to grow, with the Chrysler and the Empire State Buildings each claiming new records, reaching 1,046 feet (319 m) and 1,250 feet (380 m) respectively. With the onset of the Great Depression, the real estate market collapsed, and new construction stuttered to a halt, ending this era of skyscraper construction. Popular and academic culture embraced the skyscraper through films, photography, literature, and ballet, seeing the buildings as either positive symbols of modernity and science, or alternatively examples of the ills of modern life and society. Skyscraper projects after World War II typically rejected the designs of the early skyscrapers, instead embracing the international style; many older skyscrapers were redesigned to suit contemporary tastes or even demolished—such as the Singer Tower, once the world's tallest skyscraper.

== Background: 1850–1879 ==
=== Skyscraper precursors ===
Tall structures have been built in some form or another for millennia. Egypt's Great Pyramid of Giza, built in the 26th century BC at a height of 481 feet (147 m), (Note: It has since weathered down to 454.4 feet (138.5 m).) would remain the tallest structure on Earth for millennia until it was surpassed in the Middle Ages. (Note: The title is usually said to have passed to Lincoln Cathedral in England at a height of 525 feet (160 m) in 1311, although others dispute this figure.) The term "skyscraper" was first used in the 1780s to describe a particularly tall horse, before later being applied to, among other things, the sail at the top of a ship's mast, tall hats and bonnets, tall men, and a ball that was hit high into the air. In the 1880s it began to be applied to buildings, first in 1883 to describe large public monuments and then in 1889 as a label for tall office blocks, coming into widespread use over the next decade.

Unlike the tall buildings of Antiquity and the Middle Ages, which were primarily built for ceremonial and religious purposes, skyscrapers were largely targeted towards business applications. Various technological developments of the 19th century, which included such design elements as wind bracing and crucially the use of an iron-framed skeleton, further differentiated skyscrapers from earlier tall secular buildings, such as those in the Old Town of Edinburgh.

Development of these skyscrapers was concentrated in the American cities of New York and Chicago, but was not entirely exclusive to them; precursors of the form exist in Europe, especially the United Kingdom. The Ditherington Flax Mill was built in Shropshire in 1797 as the world's first iron-framed building, and as such has been referred to as "the father of the skyscraper".

=== Commercial and social drivers ===
Early skyscrapers emerged in the United States as a result of economic growth, the financial organization of American businesses, and the intensive use of land. New York City was one of the centers of early skyscraper construction and had a history as a key seaport located on the small island of Manhattan, on the east coast of the U.S. As a consequence of its colonial history and city planning, New York's real estate was broken up into many small parcels of land, with few large sites. During the first half of the 19th century it became the national center of American finance, and the banks in the financial district of Manhattan competed fiercely with English institutions for international dominance.

The Great Fire of 1835 destroyed most of the old financial buildings, and in their place a wide variety of new buildings were erected and demolished in quick succession during the 1840s and 1850s; traveler Philip Hone suggested that the entire city was being rebuilt every decade. Most buildings adopted the Italian Renaissance inspired palazzo-style of architecture popular in England, and rose no more than five or six stories. New York did not have any restrictions on the height of buildings, but in practice low-rise buildings were the norm, at least until 1865, with the tallest buildings being the city's churches. New York's population tripled between 1840 and 1870, and property values soared, increasing by more than 90 percent between 1860 and 1875.

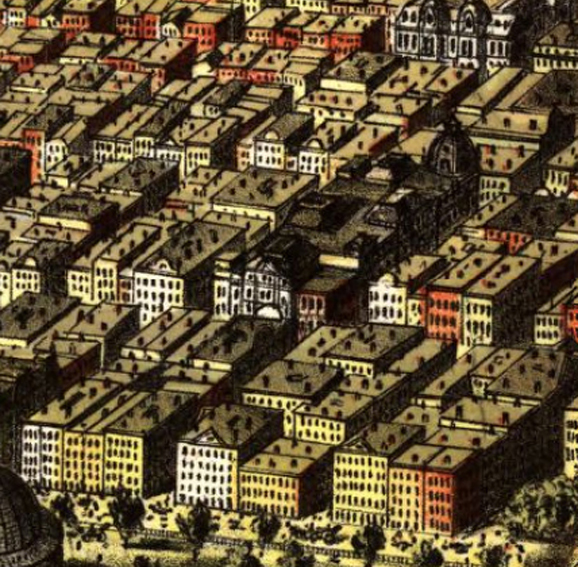
Currier and Ives' 1874 map of Chicago shows low-rise buildings constructed after the fire of 1871

Further west, the city of Chicago became the other major site in the development of early skyscrapers. In contrast to New York, Chicago emerged as a major metropolis only in the mid-19th century, growing from a village of around fifty inhabitants in 1830, to a city of 30,000 in 1850 and nearly 300,000 by 1870. Chicago became the railroad hub for the American West and the primary trading city for the emerging territories, famous for its commercial culture. It saw itself as different from the cities on the east coast and was immensely proud of its status as a growing, vibrant center. As early as 1868, its commercial buildings were touted as being "unequalled in the East for grandeur, business, or wealth", but such claims were regarded as risible. (Note: William Corkran, arriving from New York that year to become the librarian of the Chicago Historical Society, noted that "Driving slowly down Lake Street, which was then the principal street, he [a representative from the Society] pointed out some three or four stores, which he assured me were unequalled in the East for grandeur, business, or wealth. We could not help an involuntary smile at the impertinence [impudence] of the assertion, as we believed we could find as good stores on Tenth, or even Eleventh Avenue.")

By the 1870s, Chicago had become the main financial center for the West, but in October 1871 the Great Chicago Fire destroyed the majority of the wooden structures within the city. The city was rebuilt on large plots of land in a grid network and followed new city ordinances that prohibited construction in wood. These factors encouraged the building of taller properties in new innovative designs, which, like New York, saw a range of businesses and services being packed into single buildings. Especially popular in the post-fire era were "commercial blocks", several-story masonry buildings built to property lines with only one street facade that was adorned in such styles as Italianate, Classical Revival, and English Gothic. Such blocks, which were very flexible in their use, had already been prolific before the fire, and early post-fire reconstruction differed from the old styles downtown only in scale.

The construction of taller buildings during the 1870s was hindered by the financial Panic of 1873 and the ensuing economic depression, which lasted until around 1879. Construction slowed, and property values slumped. By 1880, however, the recovery was well underway, with new construction in New York returning to the pace of 1871, and the economic upturn making the construction of taller buildings an attractive financial option again, establishing many of the preconditions for the development of the skyscraper.

=== Technological developments ===
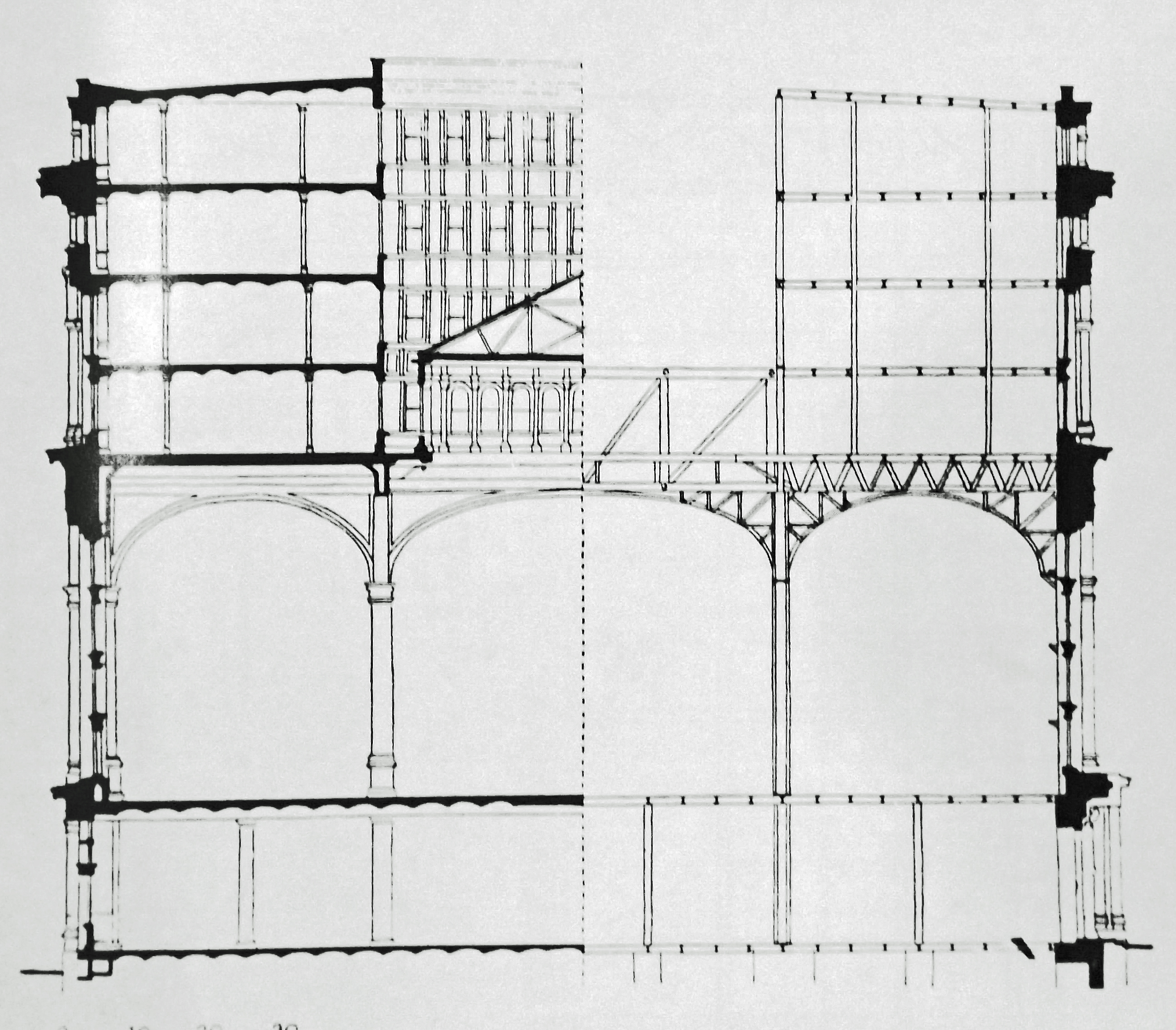
The Produce Exchange of 1884 made structural advances in metal frame design

The emergence of skyscrapers was made possible by technological improvements during the middle of the 19th century. One of these developments was the iron framed building. Masonry buildings supported their internal floors through their walls, but the taller the building, the thicker the walls had to become, particularly at the base. In the 1860s, French engineers experimented with using built-up plate girders made of wrought iron to construct buildings supported by internal metal frames. These frames were stronger than traditional masonry and permitted much thinner walls. The methodology was extensively described in engineering journals and was initially used to build warehouses.

Using these metal frames for taller buildings, however, meant exposing them to increased wind pressure. As a consequence, protective wind bracing had to be introduced, enabled by the work of Augustin-Jean Fresnel who produced equations for calculating the loads and moments on larger buildings. (Note: Despite this work on wind pressure, up until the late 1890s it was still, incorrectly, believed that wide skyscrapers did not need wind bracing.) Metal-framed buildings were also vulnerable to fire and required special fireproofing. French engineers had made advances in this area in the early 19th century, and major breakthroughs came with the work of architect Peter Wight in the 1860s. Spurred on by the catastrophic fires in Chicago in 1871 and Boston in 1872, his findings were turned into a wide variety of patented fireproofing products during the 1870s.

Taller, heavier buildings such as skyscrapers also required stronger foundations than smaller buildings. Earlier buildings had typically rested their foundations on rubble, which was in turn laid down on the soft top layer of the ground called the overburden. As buildings became taller and heavier, the overburden could not support their weight, and foundations increasingly needed to rest directly on the bedrock below. In both New York and Chicago this required digging down a considerable distance through soft soil and often below the water table, risking the hole filling up with water before the foundations were complete. The deeper the foundations needed to be, the greater the challenge. Special water-tight boxes called caissons were invented to deal with this problem in England in 1830 and adopted in the U.S. during the 1850s and 1860s.

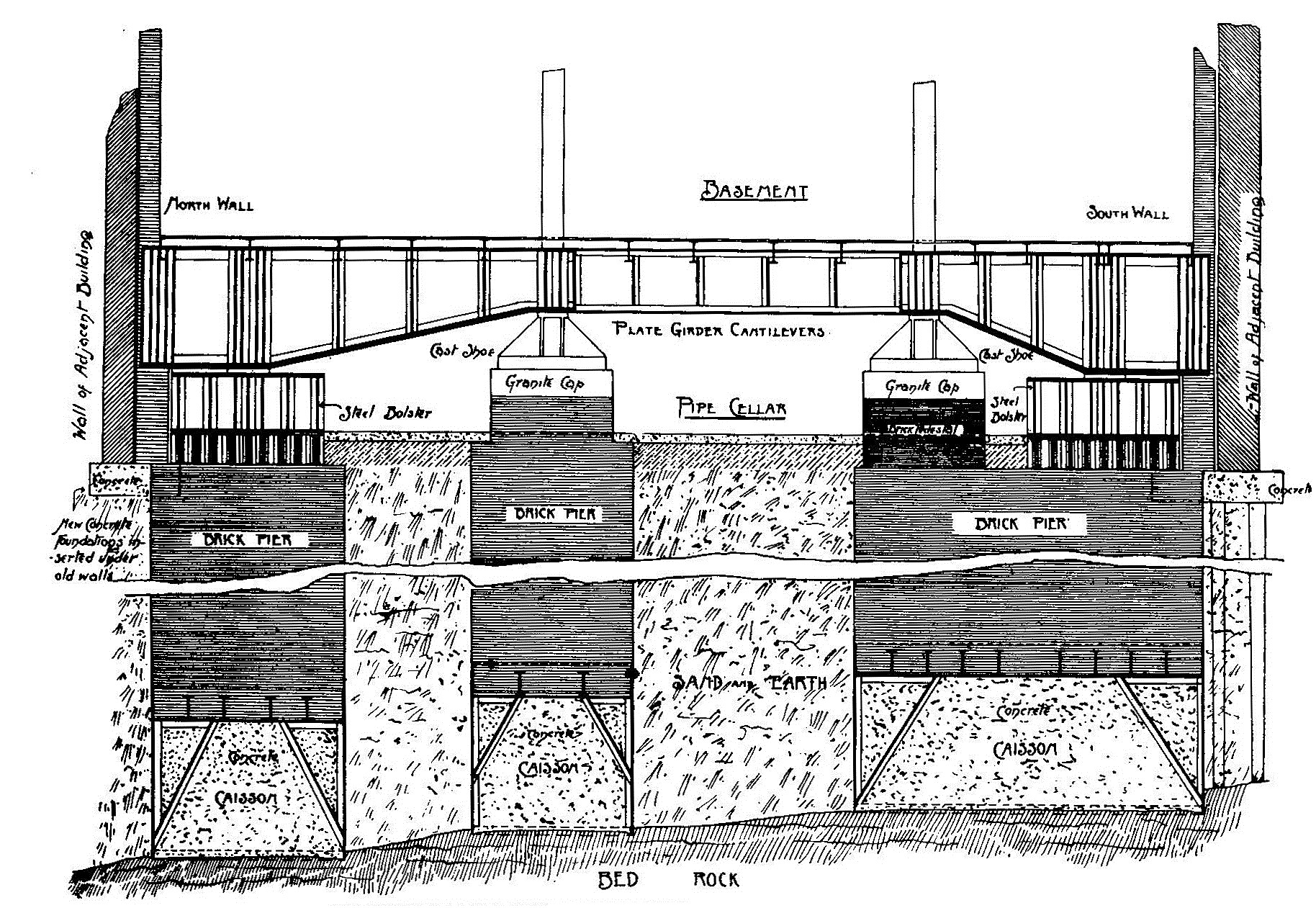
Early skyscraper caisson foundations, 1898

The development of the elevator was also essential to the emergence of the early skyscrapers, as office buildings taller than around six stories would have been impractical without them. Powered elevators were first installed in England during the 1830s and spread to U.S. factories and hotels by the 1840s. Elevators using hoist ropes, however, could only function effectively in low-rise buildings, and this limitation encouraged the introduction of the hydraulic elevator in 1870, even though early models contained dangerous design flaws. By 1876 these problems had been resolved, providing a solution for servicing the early skyscrapers.

New environmental technologies in heating, lighting, ventilation and sanitation were also critical to creating taller buildings that were attractive to work in. Central heating could not be easily extended to serve larger buildings; in the 1850s, a system using low-pressure steam and steam-operated fans became adopted in the construction of the later skyscrapers. Many U.S. buildings were lit by gas, but this carried safety risks and was difficult to install in taller buildings. As an alternative, electric lights were installed from 1878 onwards, powered by basement generators. Ventilation was also a challenge, as smoke drifting into offices from the streets and the fumes from the gas lighting made air quality a major health issue. A steam-driven, forced-draft ventilation system was invented in 1860 and became widely used in taller buildings by the 1870s, overcoming much of the problem. Improvements in iron piping permitted running hot and cold water and sanitation facilities to be installed throughout taller buildings for the first time.

== Emergence of the skyscraper: 1880–1899 ==
=== The first skyscraper ===
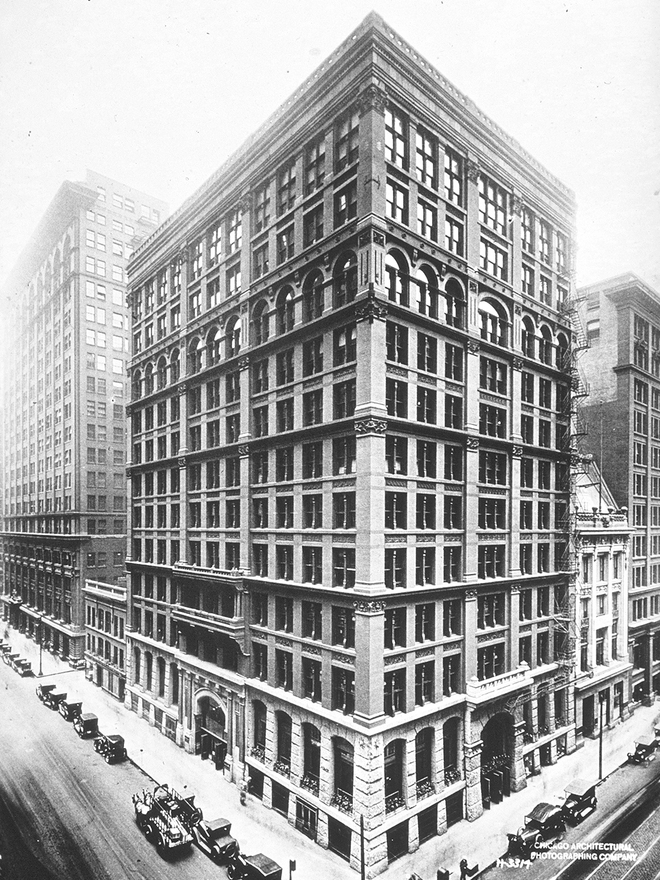
Chicago's Home Insurance Building, often considered the world's first skyscraper, was completed in 1885

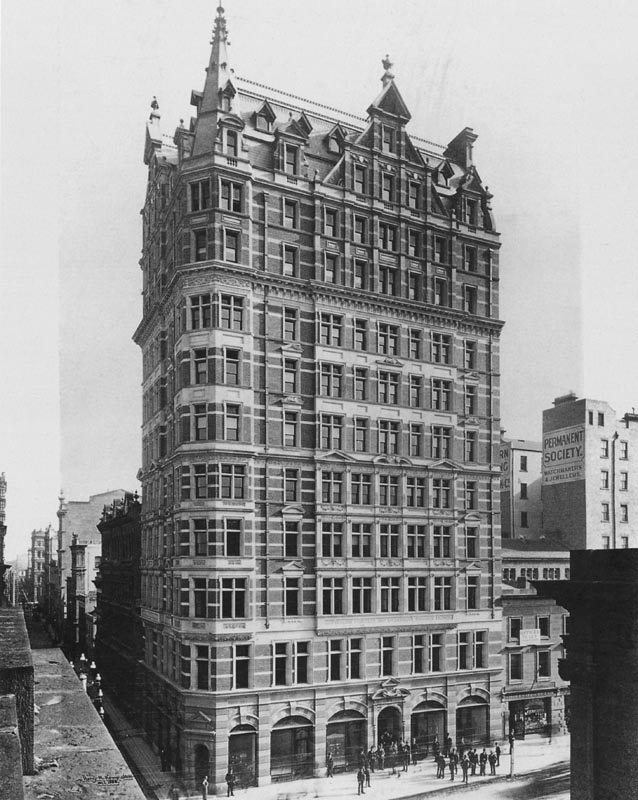
APA Building (c. 1889–1890) in Melbourne, Australia, an example of an early skyscraper outside of North America

There is academic disagreement over which building should be considered the first skyscraper. Identifying the first "true skyscraper" is not straightforward, and various candidates exist depending on the criteria applied. George Post's New York Equitable Life Building of 1870, for example, was the first tall office building to use the elevator, while his Produce Exchange building of 1884 made substantial structural advances in metal frame design. The Home Insurance Building in Chicago, opened in 1885, is, however, most often labeled the first skyscraper because of its innovative use of structural steel in a metal frame design.

The Home Insurance Building was a 138-foot (42 m) tall, 10-story skyscraper designed by William Le Baron Jenney, who had been trained as an engineer in France and was a leading architect in Chicago. (Note: Sources during the period covered by this article often vary in their calculation of how many stories an early skyscraper had, depending on how they were counted and what material the writer drew on.) Jenney's design was unusual in that it incorporated structural steel into the building's internal metal frame alongside the traditional wrought iron. This frame took the weight of the floors of the building and helped to support the weight of the external walls as well, proving an important step towards creating the genuine non-structural curtain walls that became a feature of later skyscrapers. The design was not perfect – some of the weight was still carried by masonry walls, and the metal frame was bolted, rather than riveted, together – but it was clearly a significant advance in tall building construction.

The approach quickly caught on in Chicago. In 1889 the Tacoma Building replaced the bolted metal design with a stronger riveted approach, and Chicago's Chamber of Commerce Building introduced interior light courts to the structural design of skyscrapers. The 1890 Rand McNally Building became the first entirely self-supporting, steel-framed skyscraper. Some buildings, such as The Rookery and the Monadnock Building, combined elements of both the newer and older styles, but generally Chicago rapidly adopted steel structures as a flexible and effective way to produce a range of tall buildings. Structural engineers specializing in the steel frame design began to establish practices in Chicago.

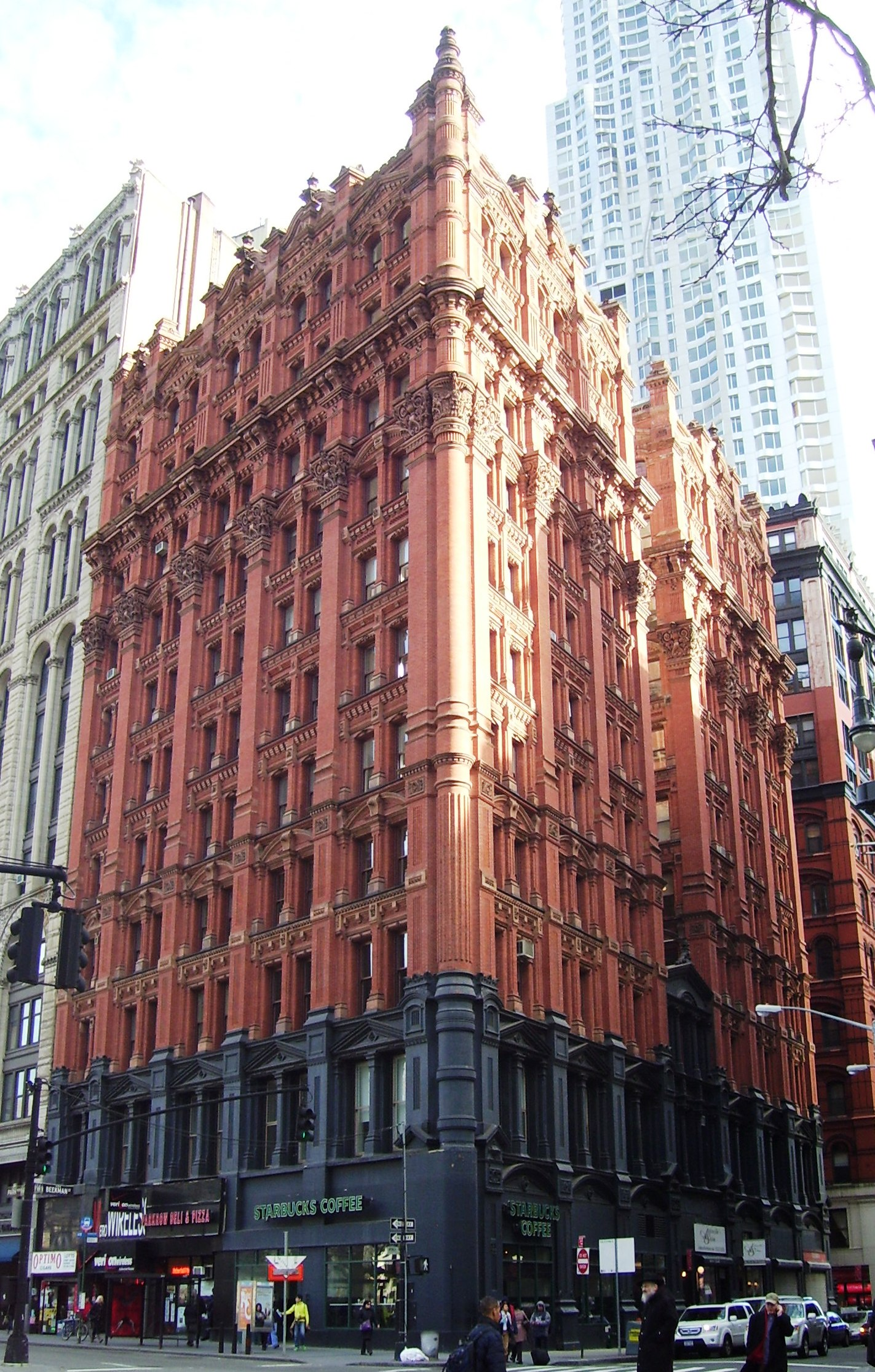
The Potter Building, New York, built 1883–1886

There was a boom in skyscraper construction in Chicago from 1888 onwards. By 1893, Chicago had built 12 skyscrapers between 16 and 20 stories tall, tightly clustered in the center of the financial district. Chicago's skyscrapers, however, were constrained by the contemporary limits of steel-frame design and the muddy sub-soil in the city, which together limited most of its skyscrapers to around 16 or 17 stories. Chicago's skyscrapers rapidly became tourist destinations for the views of the wider city they provided from their upper floors and as attractive sites in their own right. Tourists were advised to hire cabs for street tours of the skyscrapers – by lying back in the cab, they would be able to safely take in the tops of the tall buildings.

The Masonic Temple was the most prominent of these skyscrapers. Built by the Freemasons of Chicago in 1892, at a time when the Masons were a fast-growing social community, the lavish 302-foot (92 m) tall skyscraper had 19 stories, the bottom ten holding shops and the higher levels containing the Masons' private suites and meeting halls, some able to hold up to 1,300 people. At the top was a roof garden and observation gallery. The Freemasons were competing with their local rivals the Odd Fellows, who intended to build a much higher skyscraper, 556 feet (169 m) tall, that they announced would be the tallest building in the world. Newspapers picked up the story, circulating facts about the size of the Temple and making comparison to historical buildings such as the Capitol or the Statue of Liberty. The Odd Fellows project failed, but the Masonic Temple capitalized on the publicity, being declared the "tallest commercial building in the world". (Note: Despite the positive publicity at the time, the stores in the Masonic Temple had mostly failed by 1897.)

In comparison, New York trailed behind Chicago, having only four buildings over 16 stories tall by 1893. Part of the delay was caused by the slowness of the city authorities to authorize metal-frame construction techniques; it was not until 1889 that they relented and allowed Bradford Gilbert to construct the Tower Building, an 11-story iron-framed skyscraper. This encouraged the building of more skyscrapers in New York, although the city remained cautious about the technology for some years. Finally, in 1895 a breakthrough was made with the construction of the American Surety Building, a twenty-story, 303-foot (92 m) high-steel development that broke Chicago's height record. From then on, New York thoroughly embraced skeleton frame construction. In particular, New York newspaper companies adopted the skyscraper, building several along Park Row, sometimes termed "Newspaper Row", in the 1880s and 1890s. A few early skyscrapers were also constructed in Baltimore, Boston, Pittsburgh, St. Louis, Rochester, and Buffalo, such as the Wainwright Building, Wilder Building, Equitable Building, and Guaranty Building. Early examples on the West Coast include the Old Chronicle Building and the Call Building in San Francisco, as well as the Luzon Building in Tacoma, Washington. Early skyscrapers outside the United States include the APA Building (c. 1889–1890) in Melbourne, Australia, the Ryōunkaku (1890) in Tokyo, Japan and the Witte Huis (1898) in Rotterdam, the Netherlands.

=== Architectural challenges ===
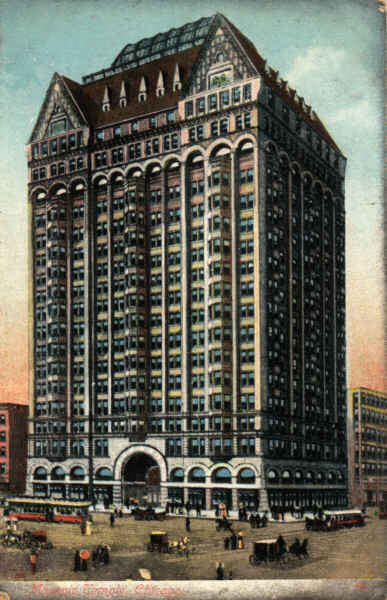
Chicago's Masonic Temple Building depicted in 1909, showing the tripartite division of the building's exterior and the typical Chicago window bays

The architects of early skyscrapers faced a number of challenges. The most fashionable architectural style in the late 19th century was the French Beaux-Arts movement, sometimes termed the Italian Renaissance style, which applied Classical aesthetic principles to modern buildings. American architects trained in the Beaux-Arts style at the Parisian Académie des Beaux-Arts began to return home in the 1880s, bringing these ideals and standards with them. Applying contemporary Beaux-Arts standards to early skyscrapers, however, was not straightforward. The buildings that the Beaux-Arts movement influenced were typically much shorter and broader than any skyscraper, as it was difficult to accurately reproduce the style in a tall, narrow building.

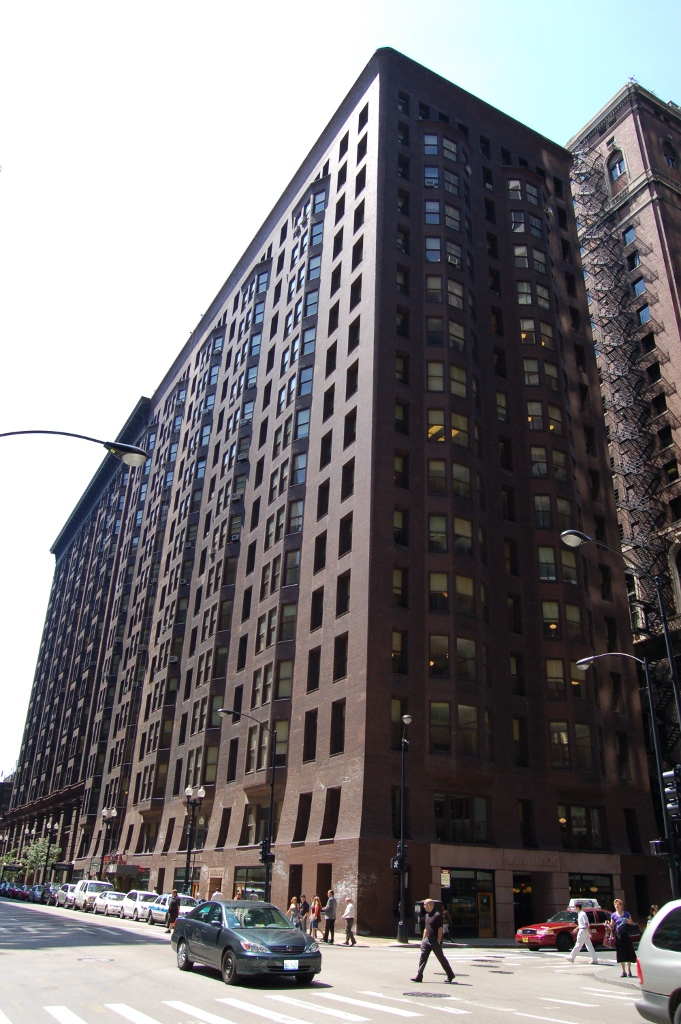
Monadnock Building (1891–1893) was intentionally commissioned to be built with no external ornamentation

Skyscrapers were also primarily commercial buildings, and economics as well as aesthetics had to play an important part in their design. The architectural writer Barr Ferree noted in 1893 that "current American architecture is not a matter of art, but of business. A building must pay, or there will be no investor ready with the money to meet its cost. This is at once the curse and the glory of American architecture." George Hill echoed the theme, condemning unnecessary features on the basis that "every cubic foot that is used for purely ornamental purposes beyond that needed to express its use and to make it harmonize with others of its class, is a waste". Monadnock Block, the tallest load-bearing brick building ever constructed, is an example of such a strict approach.

By the 1890s, Chicago architects were producing a solution to this problem, creating a new architectural style, often termed the "Chicago school of architecture". (Note: Although often being referred to as the "Chicago school of architecture" it is unclear if there was an organised body of architectural thought in Chicago during the period and the views of individual architects varied on many issues.) The school included architects such as Louis Sullivan and Dankmar Adler, Jenney, John Root, and William Holabird and Martin Roche, whose designs combined architectural aesthetic theory with practical commercial sense. They favoured placing rich, ornate designs on the outside of skyscrapers at the ground level and simpler, plainer ornamentation on the upper levels, with strong vertical lines. The roofs of their skyscrapers typically formed a comprehensible outline and structure when seen at a distance as part of the city skyline. The intent was to draw the observer's eye upwards, celebrating what Sullivan termed the "lofty" nature of the skyscraper, but not wasting resources on intricate detailing unlikely to appeal to a busy businessman. At the same time, the more lavish ground floor designs would make the building stand out to passers-by and pull in the necessary business for a successful commercial building.

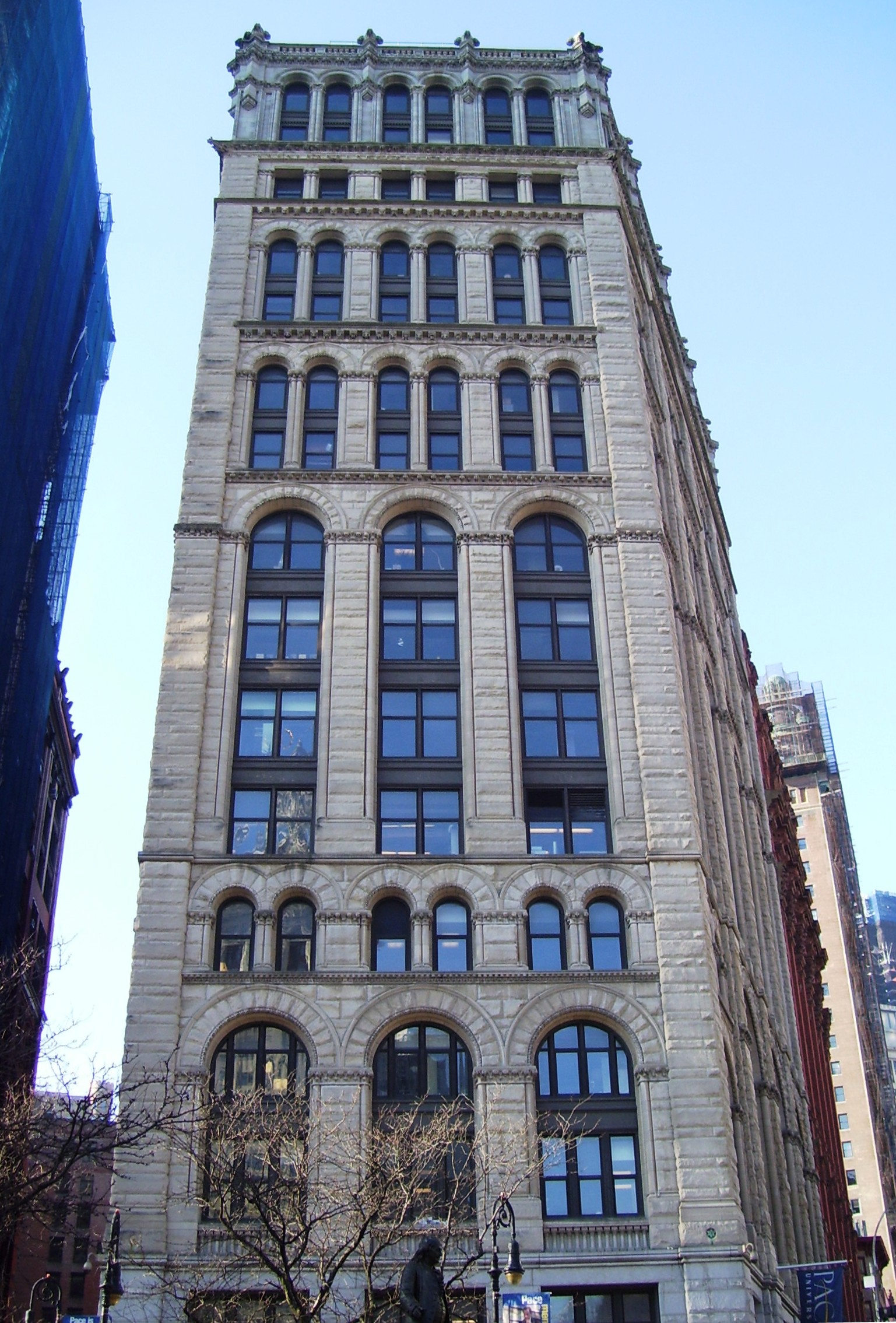
The New York Times Building in 2012, showing the multitude of different styles on a single façade typical of the city's early skyscrapers

This community also saw close collaboration between architects, specialist structural engineers, and building contractors emerge on the new skyscraper projects. Historically the industry had been dominated by individuals and small firms who combined the roles of architect and engineer, but this broke down in Chicago during the period, being replaced by a partnership between specialist architects who focused on the appearance of the skyscraper, and specialist engineers who focused on the structures that enabled it to be built. Chicago architectural firms grew to be large, hierarchical and with numerous specialist staff; the D. H. Burnham & Company, for example, felt like a small factory to visitors, and ultimately expanded to employ 180 staff.

The resulting Chicago school produced large, solid-looking skyscrapers, built with a common appearance and to a common height. The result was usually a box-like palazzo, illuminated with a large light court, ideally, if space allowed, in the center. The outside of the building was commonly divided into three parts: a base, middle section and the roof line. This tripartite design was intended both to emulate classical columns, and reflect the functions of the different parts of the skyscraper. The central court could form a simple courtyard, but many companies preferred to roof over the courtyard with glass to produce an atrium for shops and restaurants. Rents for these shops were up to five or six times that for office space, and made an important difference to the income from a property. Chicago skyscraper windows were also a feature of the style; these were large, fixed windows flanked by smaller sash windows on either side, which provided access to sunlight and adequate ventilation. Sometimes these protruded from the building to form a slight bay.

Although the exterior of the Chicago skyscrapers buildings were relatively plain, the entrance ways and lobbies were fitted out in a grand style. The Unity Building, for example, was reported as including "Numidian, Alps, Green and Sienna marbles ... an artistic screen of glass and bronze ... a marble balcony" alongside "Corinthian columns with finely carved capitals, gold-leaf and silver chandeliers, and silver-plated latticework" on the elevators. The aim was to project a sense of prosperity and solid financial credentials, which in turn would attract tenants willing to pay high rents. For the tenants, such surroundings were good for their own business credibility and affirmed their own social status as professionals.

New York faced similar architectural challenges, but in comparison to Chicago, skyscraper architects worked less closely with engineers and other specialists, and instead held strong backgrounds in the Beaux Arts movement and perceived their role to be primarily artistic rather than a partnership with the mechanical arts. Their practices tended to be smaller, resembling atelier style workshops. Structural engineers in New York took longer to build up a strong professional role there, a trend reflected in the lower engineering quality of many early skyscrapers in the city. The New York style emphasized stunning height and a somewhat eclectic use of architectural features from other periods, creating an energetic, flamboyant appearance. Towers were common, making best use of the relatively small plots of land in New York. Some New York skyscrapers emulated the tripartite style of Chicago, but others broke their exterior down into many different layers, each with its own style. Proponents argued that this reintroduced a sense of human proportion to these tall buildings; critics felt that the results were confusing and ungainly.

=== Life in early skyscrapers ===
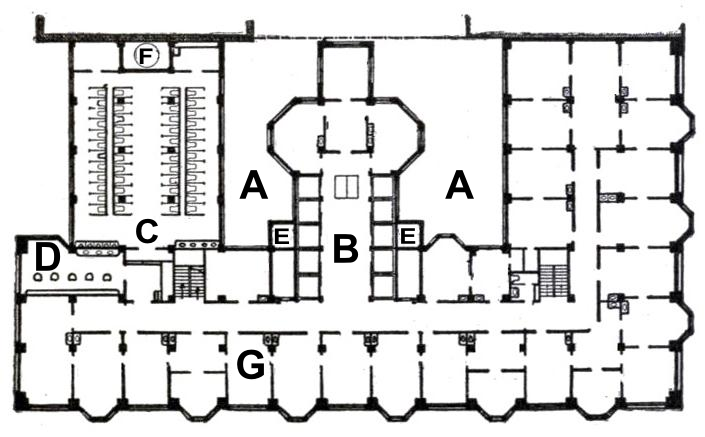
Plan of a typical level of the Chicago Stock Exchange Building, 1893: A: Court; B: Hall; C: Toilet; D: Barbershop; E: Vents; F: Flue; G: Office, 12 feet (3.7 m) by 19 feet (5.8 m)

Early skyscrapers were mainly made up of small office cubicles, commonly only 12 feet (3.7 m) across, which were placed adjacent to one another along long corridors, following a pattern first invented in the Oriel Chambers building in England in 1864. This allowed the average small company to rent a small amount of space using one or two offices, but held out the option for future expansion by renting additional office cubicles if required at a later date. A skyscraper office relied on natural sunlight from the windows but if necessary was dimly lit from electric desk-top lamps. By the standards of the day, these offices were very modern, with radiators, air vents, and the latest fixtures and fittings, and modern communication systems, including telephone and pneumatic tubes were often installed. As a result, many businesses chose to move out of their older, low-rise offices in Chicago to take up tenancy in the new skyscrapers, which were felt to be more convenient and healthier.

The first skyscrapers were mainly occupied by male workers, but this changed during the 1890s, with female employees becoming more common. The percentage of female clerical workers in Chicago, for example, increased from 11 percent in 1880 to 21 percent by 1890, reaching 30 percent by 1900. Various moral concerns were raised about men and women mixing in such offices, which were characterized as being masculine spaces, full of tobacco smoke and profanity and therefore unsuitable for women. The new female workers typically worked as typists or stenographers, using the recently invented typewriter, which grew in number in U.S. offices from 146 in 1879 to 65,000 by 1890.

Skyscrapers provided a wide range of in-house services for their tenants, including shops, restaurants, barbers, tobacconists, newsagents, tailors, professional specialists and libraries. Skyscrapers also employed a substantial number of service staff to maintain and support them; a building such as the Chicago Board of Trade spent 20 percent of its rental revenue on service staff, employing 41 people, including janitors, elevator operators, engineers, and an electrician. With this collection of services and facilities, skyscrapers of the period were often referred to as small cities in their own right.

=== Criticism and reform in Chicago ===
Opposition to Chicago's skyscrapers began to grow during the late 1880s and early 1890s. Even before the development of the skyscraper, some criticized large buildings in Chicago for dominating churches and private houses, and this sentiment strengthened. Critics complained that the concentration of tall buildings in the center of the city was causing huge congestion, and each new skyscraper was also burning additional coal to power its facilities, together consuming a total of over one million tons each year, leaving smoke and stagnant air hanging over Chicago. Many were concerned over the risk of a major fire breaking out and spreading, uncontrolled, from building to building.

Chicago was not alone in having concerns over the growth of the skyscraper. In Boston, the Fiske and the Ames Buildings were built in the late 1880s, 183 ft (56 m) and 190 feet (58 m) tall respectively, but protests by local civic campaigners and the real estate industry resulted in the city passing a law to limit new buildings to a maximum of 123 feet (37 m), effectively banning the construction of skyscrapers. The cities of Philadelphia, Los Angeles and Washington D.C. similarly introduced height restriction laws to limit skyscraper construction.

The decisive factor in favor of change in Chicago, however, was the economic slowdown in the early 1890s, which gave way to the financial panic of 1893. The recession, combined with the frantic building of the previous few years, meant that Chicago suddenly had a significant surplus of office space, threatening occupancy levels and rents. Regulation was introduced by the city council to control the problem in 1892, with support from the real estate industry who hoped to slow the construction of additional office space and shore up their diminishing profit margins. The height of new buildings was limited to 150 feet (46 m), with lower height levels on narrower streets, effectively curtailing the construction of any taller skyscrapers.

== The "First Great Age": 1900–1919 ==
The Skyscrapers of New York, a 1906 film

=== Pre-war boom ===
The early years of the 20th century saw a range of technically sophisticated, architecturally confident skyscrapers built in New York; academics Sarah Landau and Carl Condit term this "the first great age" of skyscraper building. Some were relatively conservative buildings in a classical style, such as the Mutual Life, Atlantic Mutual, and Broad Exchange Buildings, all designed by Clinton and Russell. Others broke new ground, including the Flatiron Building which opened in 1902 near Madison Square. The Chicago firm of Daniel Hudson Burnham designed the 307 feet (94 m) high, 21 story structure; the unusually shaped, narrow building needed particularly strong wind bracing, while the facade was richly textured and incorporated stylistic features more common in Chicago. A critical and popular success, the Flatiron was likened to the Parthenon of Ancient Greece and became a New York icon.

The construction of the Singer Tower was announced by the company in 1906, who intended to produce the tallest skyscraper in the world. The company already had several low-rise buildings in New York that the tower would be incorporated into and planned to rent out the bottom half of the tower to tenants to subsidize their use of the upper half. The skyscraper was designed by Ernest Flagg, a Beaux-Arts advocate and noted critic of existing skyscrapers, who justified taking on the project as a way of generating support for skyscraper reform. The design was technically challenging: the tall, narrow tower needed special wind bracing, and the deep bedrock on the site required particularly deep foundations. The tower was faced in dark brick and followed the Beaux-Arts style used by the rest of the complex, with a galleried lobby fitted out in Italian marble. When it opened in 1908, it had 41 stories and was 612 feet (187 m) tall; visitors paid $0.50 ($14 in 2020 terms) each to use the observation area at the top of the building.

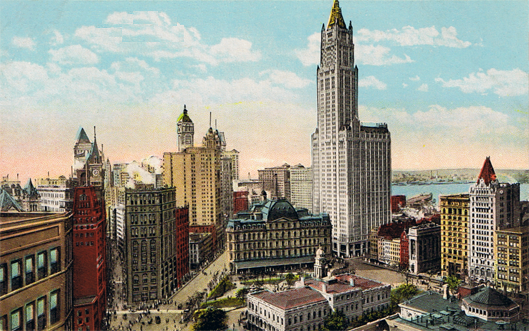
Color postcard of "The Woolworth Building and City Hall Park, New York City", around 1913, when the Woolworth was the world's tallest building

The Metropolitan Life Insurance Company Tower was opened in 1909, the culmination of a long building project by N. LeBrun and Sons to hold Metropolitan Life's growing headquarters staff, 2,800 strong by 1909. At 700 feet (210 m) high and with 50 stories, it became the world's new tallest building. Metropolitan Life intended the skyscraper to promote the company's image, and the building was surrounded by publicity. The tower was featured on the front of prominent magazines such as Scientific American, as well as on the sides of corn flake boxes, coffee packets, and cars. (Note: Metropolitan Life valued the free publicity surrounding its skyscraper building at over $440,000 ($198 million in 2010 terms).) The tower was loosely modeled on the Venetian St Mark's Campanile, and featured extensive Early Renaissance-style detailing, with the more modern additions of huge clock faces, electric floodlights for night-time illumination, and an observation deck at the top. The design won critical acclaim within the American architectural profession.

The construction of the Woolworth Building was announced in 1910 by Frank Woolworth, who wanted to create the largest income-producing property in the U.S. The project grew, and Woolworth finally opted for a 55-story, 792-foot (241 m) high skyscraper, the latest tallest building in the world, at a cost of $13.5 million ($5.1 billion in 2010 terms). (Note: Prices in this article are given in US dollars throughout. Equivalent modern prices have been given in 2010 US dollars to two significant figures. The equivalent prices of modern goods and services – such as entry costs to skyscrapers – have been calculated using the Consumer Price Index (CPI). The CPI is not reliable for comparing the value of capital investment projects – such as the cost or value of early skyscrapers – over time, and these have been calculated using the relative share of GDP index.) Architect Cass Gilbert designs included a very high proportion of usable – and thus rentable – floor space, with a great deal of light and a flexible floor plan that could be subdivided for different tenants. Up-to-date fittings were installed to encourage a high-class of tenants, including the world's fastest elevators, safety features, and a swimming pool. Gilbert adopted the Beaux-Arts style, using accented terracotta and glass to emphasis vertical lines, elegantly echoing the structural frame underneath and incorporating 15th and 16th century Flamboyant Gothic-styled features. It was capped by a gilded tower that blended into the sky behind it to produce an illusion of even greater height. The building was illuminated with floodlights at night, topped with red and white flashing lights. It was famously dubbed the "Cathedral of Commerce", rather to Gilbert's displeasure as he had attempted to avoid copying ecclesiastical architecture.

Meanwhile, Chicago's skyscraper industry also boomed during the decade before World War I. The city's elevated train network was operating by 1910, allowing more workers to come into downtown. In 1910 alone 1,500,000 square feet (140,000 m^{2}) of new offices were opened and by the end of the decade, Chicago had the second largest number of headquarters offices in the U.S. Chicago architectural firms such as Daniel H. Burnham and then Graham, Anderson, Probst & White continued to design skyscrapers in the palazzo style made popular in the previous decade. Chicago had hosted the World's Columbian Exposition in 1893, a massive international event which had excited interest in the themes of classical architecture and well-designed city landscapes. Chicago also had extensive discussions in 1909 about the potential for designing large parts of the city, the Burnham Plan of Chicago.

The resulting skyscrapers reflected these debates: the Railway Exchange, the Peoples Gas and the Illinois Continental and Commercial Bank Buildings were each substantial, quarter-block wide palazzo cubes of common height, their facades divided into a classical tripartite design, and sporting classical columns and other features. Despite the apparent uniformity of design, individual buildings varied considerably in the detail of their designs in effort to express their particular identities, the Peoples Gas Building using texture and the Railway Exchange Building's white terracotta, for example.

=== Improvements in construction ===
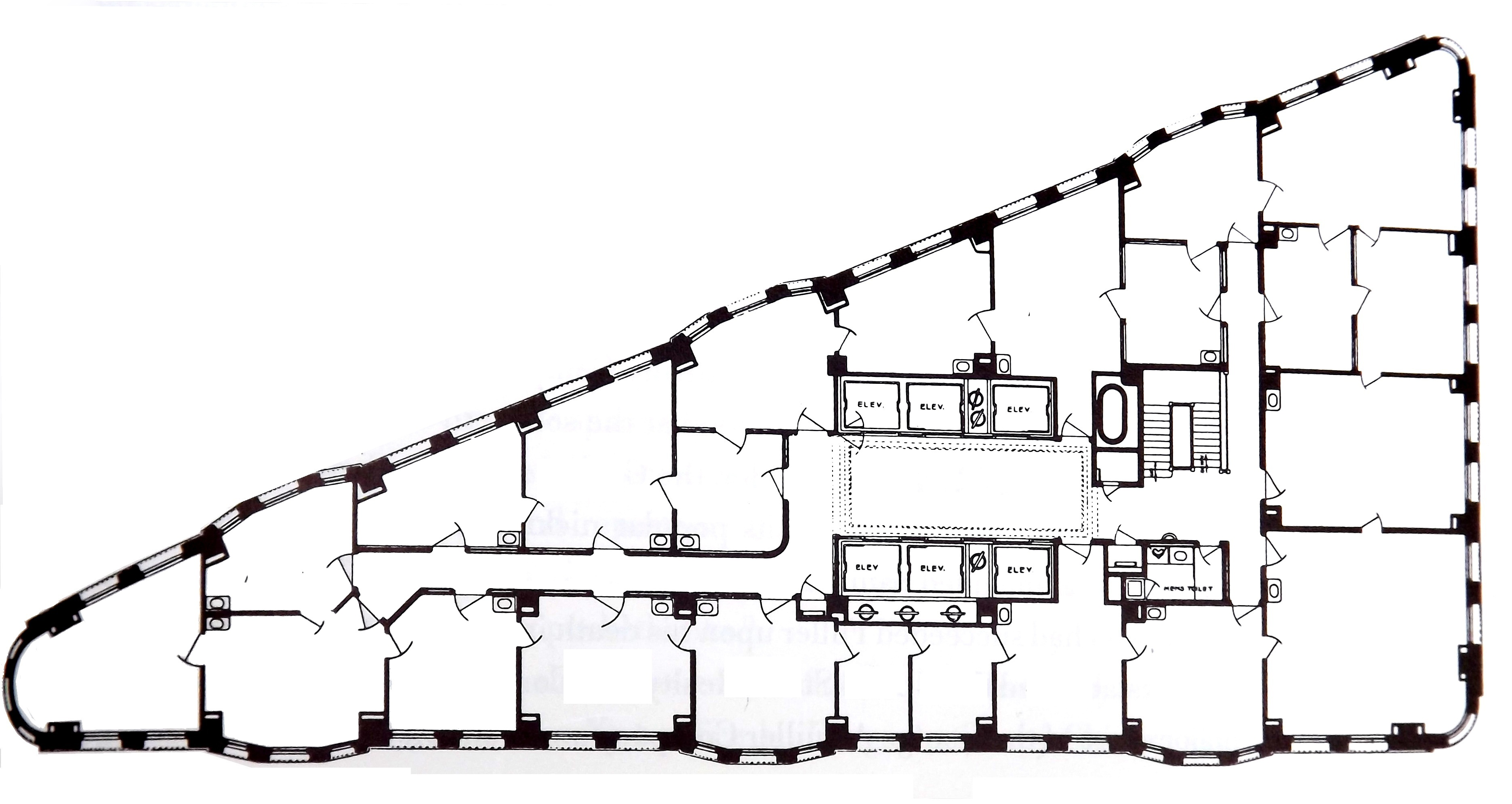
Typical floor of the Flatiron Building

The process of building skyscrapers became more sophisticated, starting with the acquisition of the real estate needed for the site. Brokers working on commission would secretly acquire the individual lots of land required for a project, operating under a variety of names to avoid having the price increase once a planned build became known. The properties at the front of the site would typically be bought first, so if news broke of the skyscraper then those owning property at the back of the plot would have little choice but to sell anyway. The funding for skyscraper developments was normally lent by banks, insurance companies, or raised through bonds sold through a specialised bond house, with the latter becoming increasingly popular after World War I.

Efforts were made to improve the processes for erecting skyscrapers, largely through the work of general contractors such as Louis Horowitz and Frank Gilbreth, who in turn drew on recent work by efficiency specialist Frederick Taylor. Time schedules were devised for all the work to be undertaken, with costs carefully monitored and reports produced each day. The results were demonstrated on the Woolworth Building construction project, where 1,153 tonnes (1,153,000 kg) of steel were assembled in only six days, a record for the period. Improved windbracing techniques were introduced. The use of pneumatic caissons in skyscraper foundations grew more advanced; in the construction of the 1908 Manhattan Municipal Building they were successfully sunk 144 feet (44 m) below the surface, with specially conditioned workers operating in shifts with constant medical support.

New technologies were also introduced within the buildings. Fast Otis elevators, powered by electricity rather than steam-driven hydraulics, began to be installed in skyscrapers, with Ellithorpe safety air cushions protecting the passengers in the case of failure. Lighting improved, with the recommended levels in 1916 being around twice the level of the 1890s. Nonetheless, skyscrapers still relied primarily on natural sunlight, which required installing large windows and having tall ceilings to allow the sunlight to penetrate the back of the offices; an office deeper than 28 feet (8.5 m) was not considered a practical design.

=== Life in the skyscrapers ===
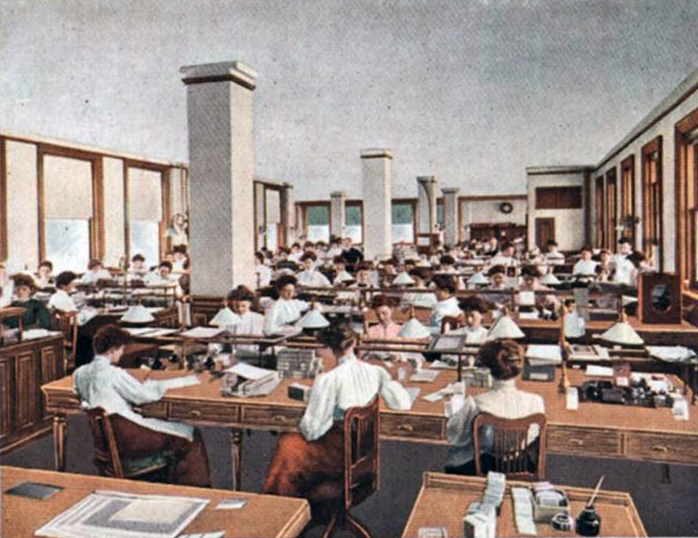
Working conditions in the Metropolitan Life Insurance Company Tower, 1910

One of the reasons for the increase in the numbers of skyscrapers during this period was the growth in demand for office workers. In part this demand was fuelled by many U.S. firms becoming larger and more complex, and white-collar sectors such as insurance and banking grew in scale. It was also driven by changing technology. The typewriter was joined in the office by the adding machine, the telephone and filing cabinets, all adding to the demand for office space and requiring increasingly specialised workers.

Tenants and rental income were essential to the financial success of any skyscraper, as even the largest skyscrapers and those founded by prominent companies rented out much of their office space. Owners could charge significantly more for office space close to the main windows, making it most efficient to build skyscrapers with as much premium office space as possible, even if this cost slightly more to construct in the first instance. As a result, a standard pattern for office units in both New York and Chicago emerged, with either a single rectangular office adjoining an exterior wall, or a T-shaped design, with a reception room giving way to two windowed offices, separated by glass partitions. Skyscrapers usually took on large numbers of relatively small companies as their tenants. A skyscraper such as the Woolworth Building had around 600 different tenants in 1913, for example; a typical tenant might rent four or five office units in a skyscraper.

=== Criticism ===
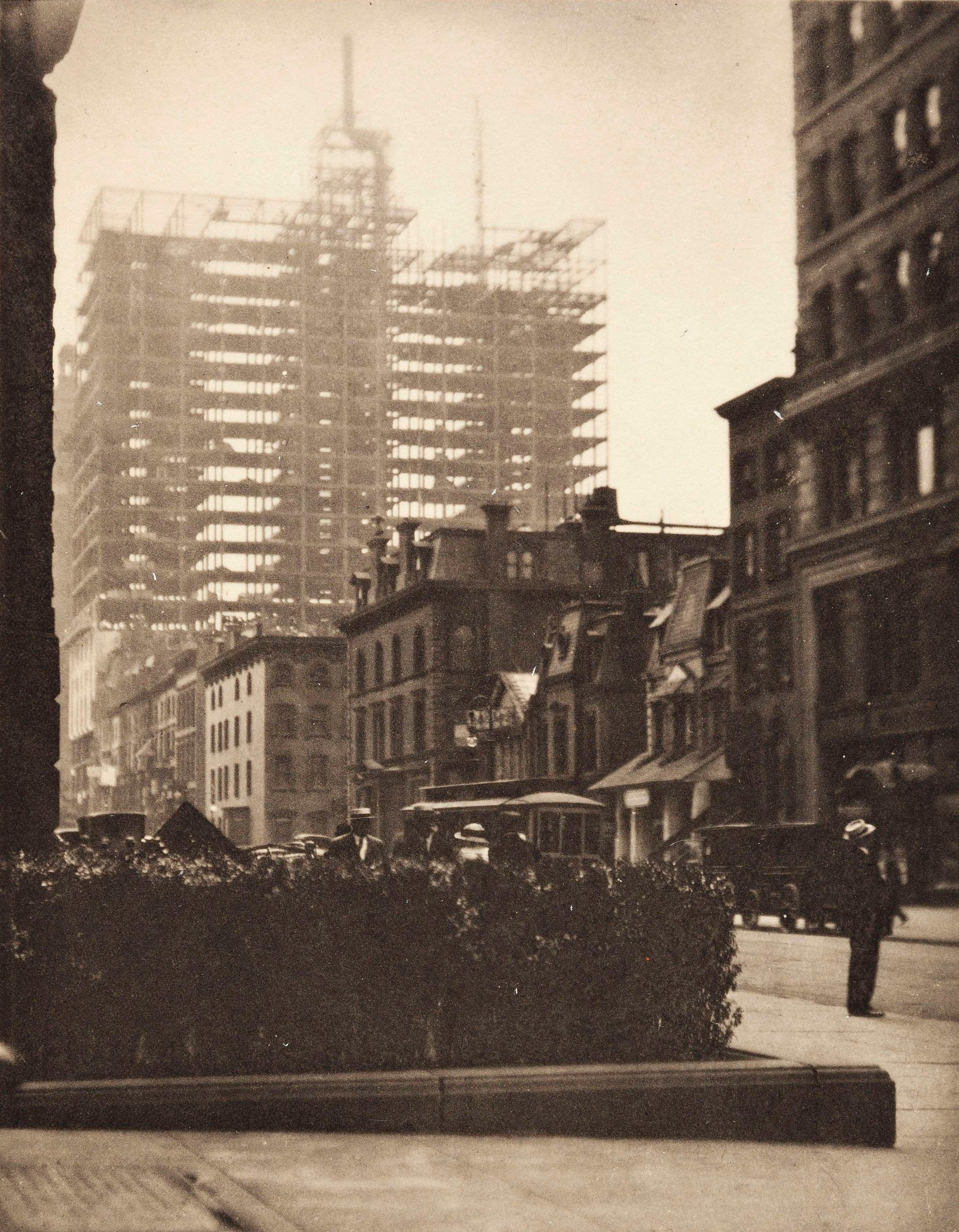
Alfred Stieglitz's 1910 work Old and New New York, showing the Vanderbilt Hotel under construction

Skyscrapers, particularly those in New York, attracted considerable comment, much of it negative. On his return to New York, writer Henry James condemned the buildings in The American Scene as simply "giants of the mere market", "mercenary monsters" doomed to be torn down in turn as other, even larger, buildings took their place. In Chicago the combination of the environmental pollution and skyscrapers meant that, as Charles Warner complained, "one can scarcely see across the streets on a damp day, and the huge buildings loom up in the black sky in ghostly dimness".

Wider artistic sentiments varied. Many, like Alfred Stieglitz, harboured mixed feelings over New York's skyscrapers, reflected in his famous 1903 portrait of the Flatiron Building, and his 1910 work Old and New New York that contrasts the growing steel frame of the emerging Vanderbilt Hotel with the old low-rise blocks of the street below. Poets also wrote about the issues, the early Modernist Sadakichi Hartmann describing how "from the city's stir and madd'ning roar" the Flatiron's "monstrous shape soars in massive flight". Artists such as Alvin Coburn and John Marin experimented with producing portraits of New York's skyscrapers, capturing the positive and negative aspects of the modern structures. In 1908 artist Harry Pettit produced a romantic interpretation of a future New York, filled with giant skyscrapers supporting aerial bridges and receiving dirigibles from around the globe.

Amongst the architectural community, the Exposition in Chicago inspired many Americans to champion planning cities that had a unified design, in which each building had unique features but elegantly complemented its neighbours, typically by being built to a common height: "horizontal visual unity". In the aftermath of the Exposition, many of these advocates joined with the Beaux-Arts movement to form the City Beautiful movement, proposing low-rise cities with wide boulevards, built in a classical style. These critics condemned New York's skyscrapers, Montgomery Schuyler describing how they had produced a "horribly jagged sierra" of a city skyline and complaining that no modern skyscraper had turned out to be an architectural success. Charles Lamb argued that the skyscraper impinged on the rights of the rest of the city by destroying the collective appearance of an urban area. Some architects, such as Charles McKim and Stanford White refused to work on such projects altogether.

=== Reform in New York ===
Calls were made in New York for legislation to prevent the growth of skyscrapers, citing their effect on the city skylines, but these attempts faced legal obstacles. The United States Constitution did not give local government authority to prevent the buildings on the grounds of aesthetics alone, and any such law in New York was considered likely to face judicial challenge.

Others argued that legal reform of skyscraper construction was needed for public health and safety reasons, an area in which U.S. law was normally more supportive of state intervention. The risk of fire was one concern; while skyscrapers might be relatively fireproof, their height made conventional fire-fighting difficult. Architect Charles Bragdon considered a large scale, devastating high-rise fire to be inevitable if regulation was not forthcoming. The Baltimore fire of 1904 was widely cited as an example of this risk and, although Baltimore had few high rise buildings, city lawyers argued that the taller buildings had caused the flames to spread through the city during the blaze. Baltimore subsequently passed a law in 1904, banning buildings higher than 70 feet (21 m). Other campaigners argued that skyscrapers were compromising access to light and air, noting that when tall buildings rose straight up from the sidewalk, they cast long shadows across the street, preventing healthy sunlight from reaching smaller buildings below.

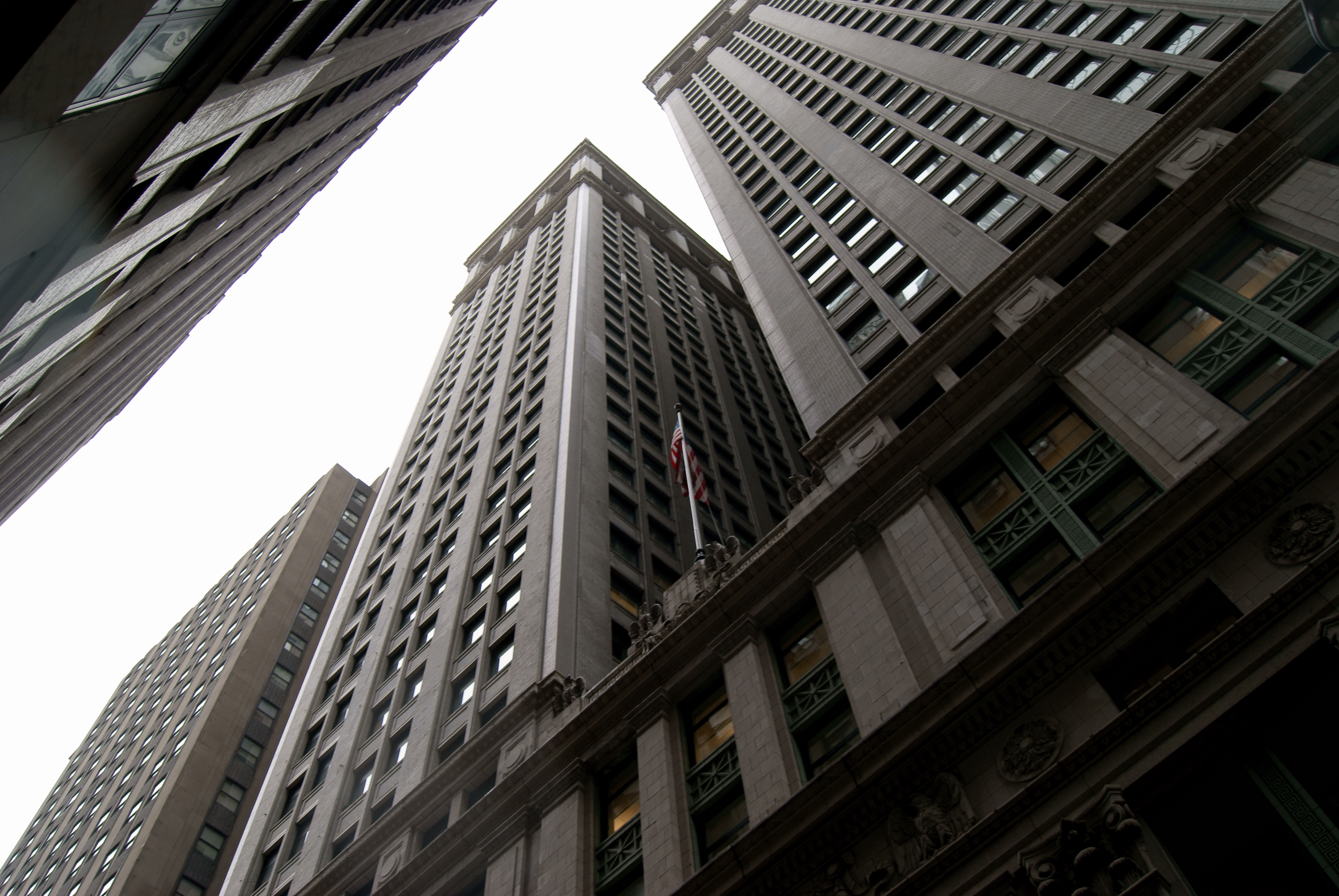
The Equitable Building in 2011, showing the effect of pre-zoning skyscrapers when seen from the sidewalk

Early attempts by Ernest Flagg to limit the height of New York's skyscrapers in 1896 failed; further unsuccessful attempts followed between 1906 and 1908, and legislation was turned down again in 1909, partially because of pressure from the real estate industry. After 1913, however, the property market in New York entered a recession, and vacancy levels in buildings began to rise. The campaign for change was helped by the construction of the Equitable Building in 1915 at the estimated cost of $29 million ($10.9 billion in 2010 terms), which rapidly became infamous as its vast height and bulk blocked views cast neighbours into permanent shade. The real estate industry finally ceased its objections to new legislation, and the 1916 Zoning Resolution was passed.

The details of the legislation were largely the work of architect George Ford. Ford had sympathies with the City Beautiful movement, disliked the unimaginative form of many New York skyscrapers, and had concerns over urban public health, but he also found tall buildings exciting and believed that horizontal visual unity produced boring architecture. As a consequence of Ford's influence, New York's laws were relatively complex and divided up the city into different zones; in each zone, a particular zoning envelope applied, controlling the height to which buildings could be built. Typically a building could only rise up from the sidewalk vertically by around 100 feet (30 m), after which the building had to be set back at a set angle to allow sunlight to reach the street below. On a quarter of the site, however, the owner could build as high as they wished, without any further restrictions.

== Interwar period, boom and depression: 1920–1939 ==
=== Post-war boom ===
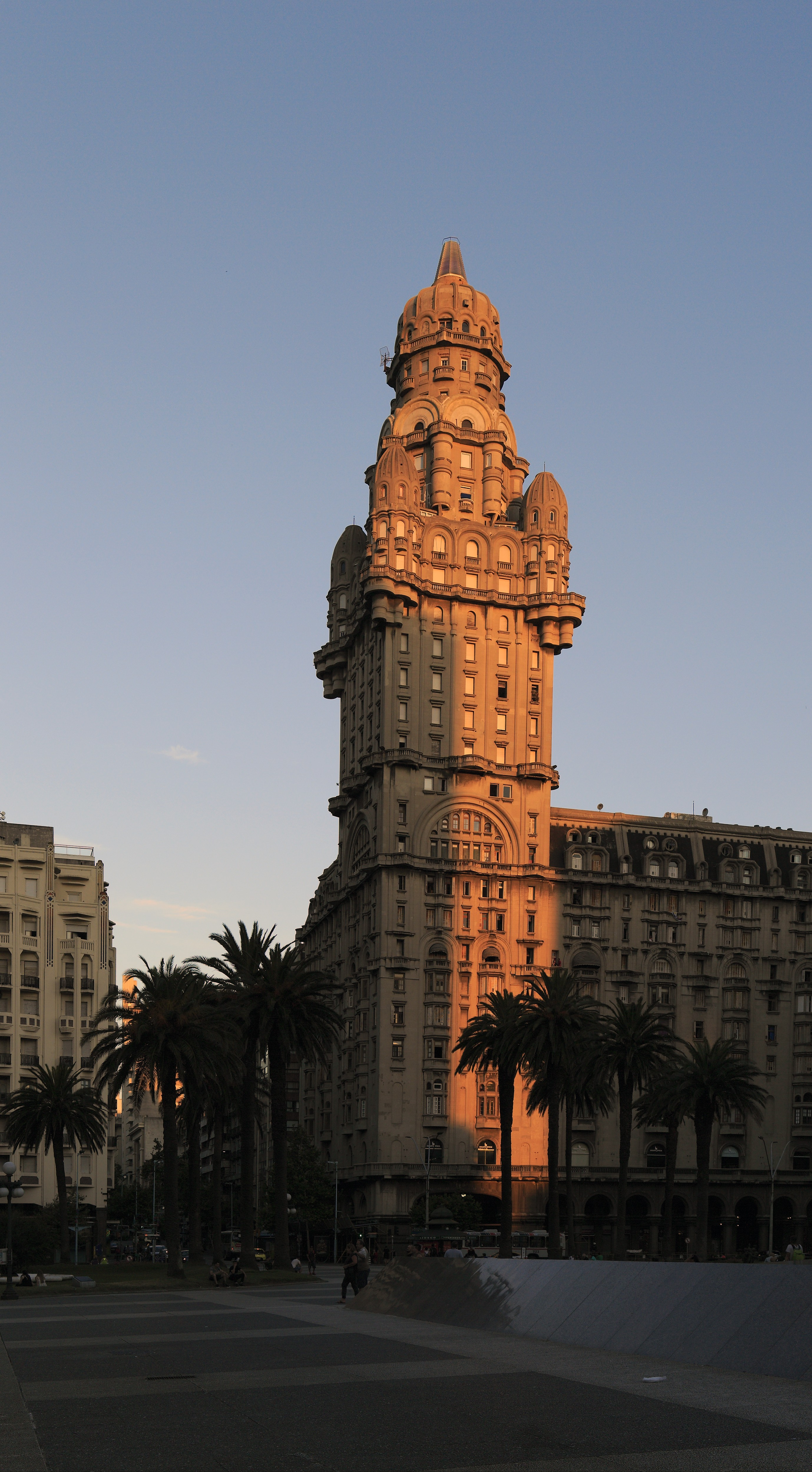
The Palacio Salvo of Montevideo built in 1928 at its completion it was the tallest reinforced concrete structure.

A real estate boom occurred in the U.S. after the end of the war, with a particular surge in the construction of new skyscrapers between 1925 and 1931. In New York, a quarter of the financial district was rebuilt between 1928 and 1931, with 17,000,000 square feet (1,600,000 m^{2}) of new office space added between 1925 and 1929 alone. In Chicago, limited wartime construction created supply shortages, and rent levels rose in response by around 100 percent between 1919 and 1924. This level of potential profits encouraged an explosion of new building projects in the city. The boom inflated prices in the real estate market, leading to speculative financing and building projects, including the introduction of 100 percent mortgages for new builds. An early edition of the Fortune magazine commented wryly that "all a man needs to own a skyscraper is the money and the land. And he may be able to get along without the money."

Skyscrapers continued to grow in height throughout the 1920s. In part this was the result of improvements in technology: steel-frame structures had become increasingly efficient, while improvements in elevator design made taller buildings easier to ascend. Commercial factors were at work too, as growing commercial demand pushed up rents, enabling taller projects, while the higher offices attracted more sunlight, permitting the charging of premium rents. The tallest buildings could also acquire publicity for their owners, in turn making it easier to find and keep the best tenants. Furthermore, the higher the cost of the underlying real estate, the taller a building needed to be to generate a suitable return on the investment, and the minimum sensible commercial height for a skyscraper project grew to between 40 and 45 stories. 70 story skyscrapers became relatively common, although an influential 1930 study demonstrated that the best rate of return on a skyscraper was to build it 63 stories high, returning an annual profit of 10.25 percent.

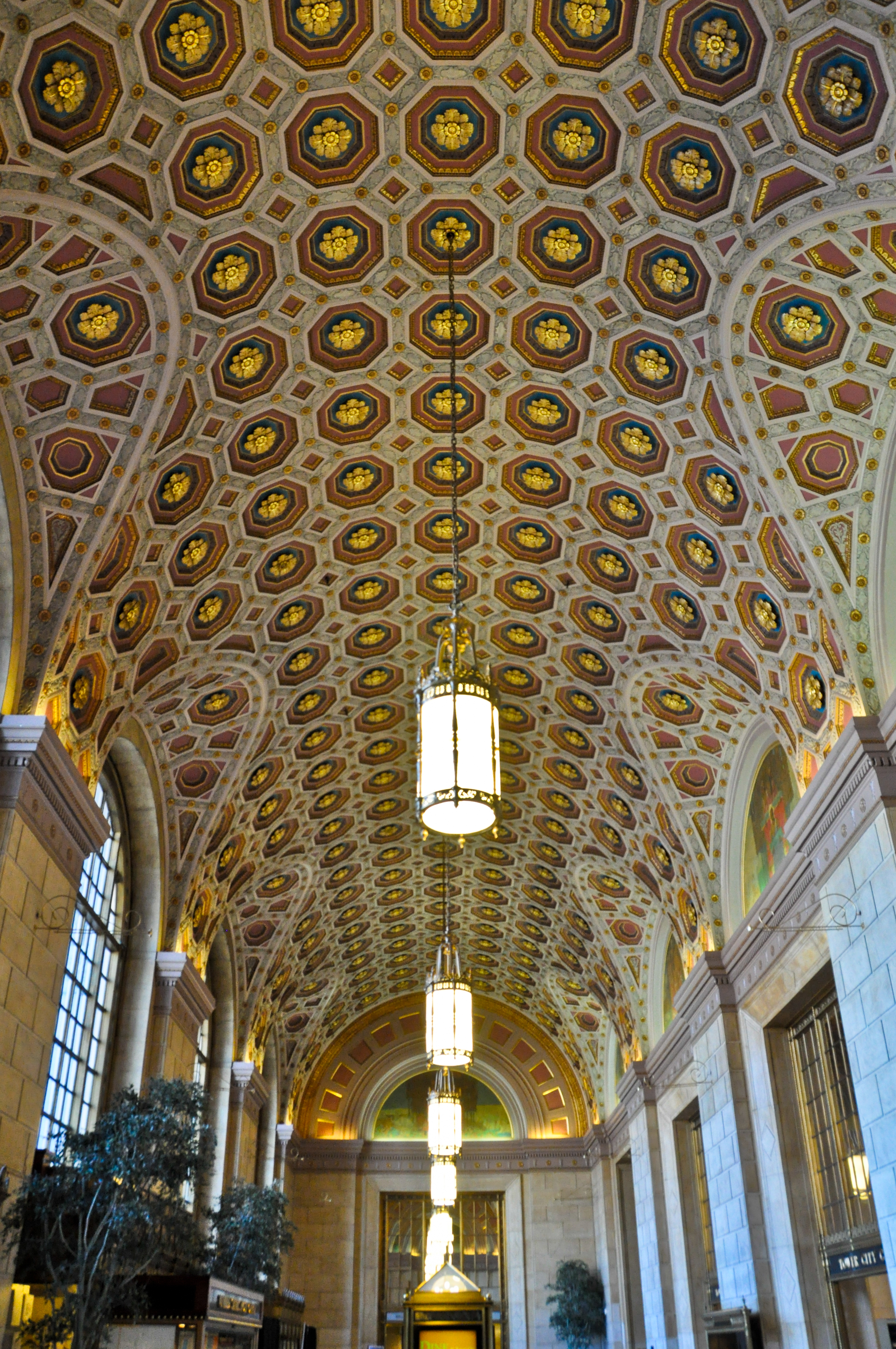
Main entrance to Cleveland's Terminal Tower in 2012

Skyscrapers continued to spread both across the U.S. and internationally. New York and Chicago remained the center of skyscraper development, but most major cities in the U.S. had built skyscrapers by 1929, frequently as a result of competition between rival cities for status and investment. Cincinnati built the Cincinnati Towers in 1914, followed by the Carew Tower Complex in 1930. In Detroit, the General Motors Building opened in 1920 and the Fisher Building in 1928. Cleveland acquired the Union Trust Building in 1923 and the Terminal Tower in 1929; the latter, built by the Van Sweringen brothers, was, for a short period, the second tallest building in the world, the tallest in the world outside of New York until 1953 and tallest in the U.S. until 1964. Seattle had built Smith Tower in 1914, and the Los Angeles local government granted itself an exemption from city planning restrictions in order to build the Los Angeles City Hall in 1928. Also in 1928, the Industrial Trust Tower was built in Providence.

Skyscrapers were also built in other developed countries, although reaching nowhere near the level of construction seen in the U.S. This was partially the result of a lack of funding but also because of local architectural preferences. Some European cities including London and Paris had laws to ban tall buildings, but elsewhere skyscrapers began to appear, including Toronto's Imperial Bank of Commerce Building, Antwerp's Boerentoren, Liverpool's Royal Liver Building, Madrid's Telefónica Building and Buenos Aires' Kavanagh Building. Many other European skyscrapers were proposed in a frenzy of excited planning, although few materialised. See:List of early skyscrapers. Soviet Russia began the construction of the 1,365-foot (416 m) Palace of the Soviets in the late 1930s, in the Socialist Classicism style, which would have become the tallest building in the world, but war intervened and the skyscraper was never completed. In the post-war years, this style resulted in the monumental Seven Sisters of Moscow.

The technology used in constructing skyscrapers continued to develop. Time was increasingly a factor in the projects, and architects and their specialist teams developed faster ways to design and construct the buildings to minimise the interest payments during construction and hasten the arrival of rental income. By 1930, skyscrapers were being erected in just 12 months by teams of workers totalling 5,000 men, with four floors being assembled in a typical week. Building skyscraper towers involved some adaption of engineering techniques, as effectively two different buildings were being designed – the base and the tower – which needed to be efficiently linked using elevators and other service facilities. Most new offices settled around a standard size, 9 feet (2.7 m) wide by 20 to 30 ft (6.1 to 9.1 m) deep, depending on the height of the ceiling, with multiple small windows considered better than a few larger ones. The output of electric lighting continued to improve, although this began to give off excessive heat within the offices. Air conditioning was first installed in a few skyscrapers during the 1930s.

=== Art Deco skyscrapers and New York's set-back style ===
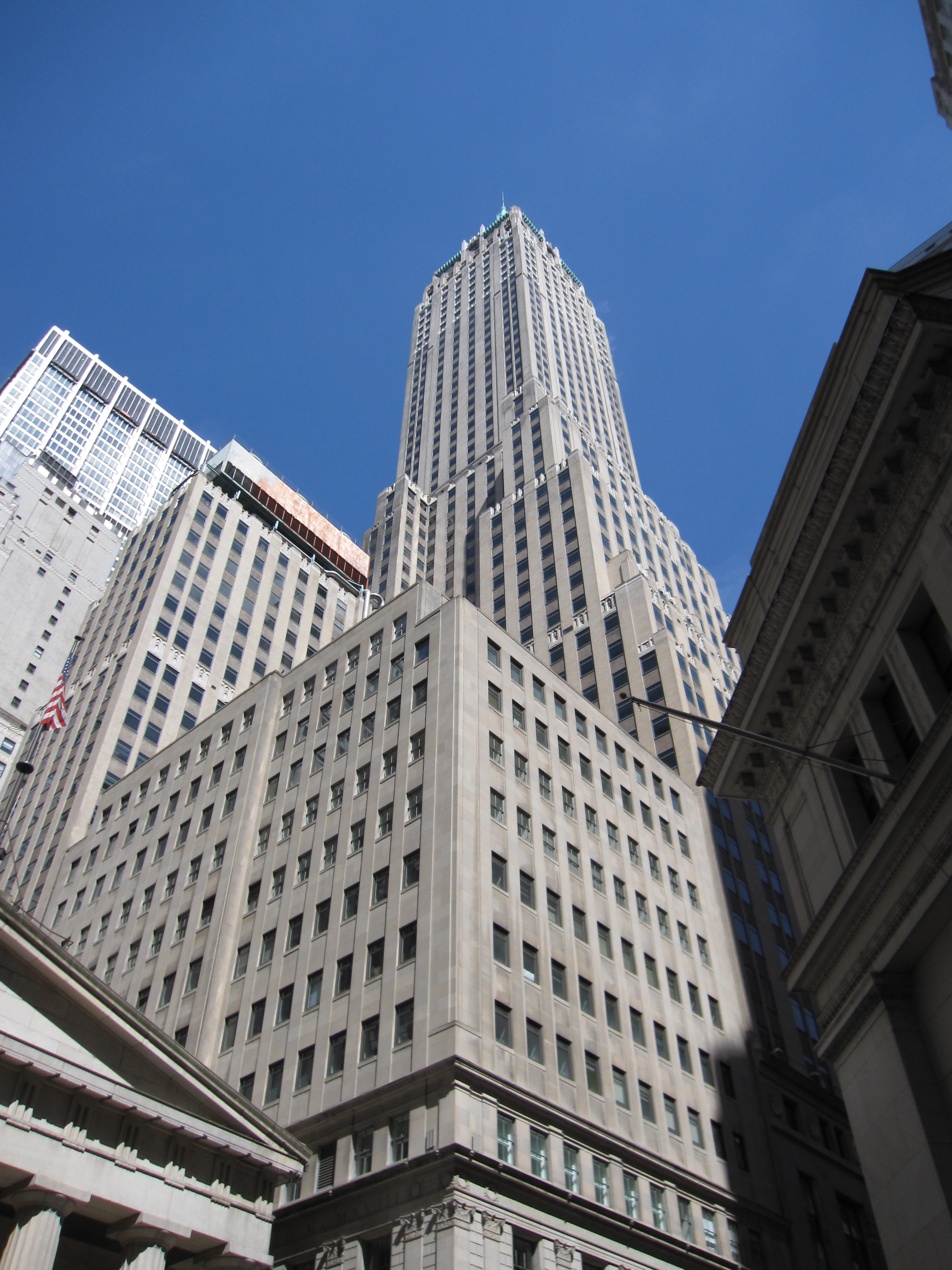
40 Wall Street in 2010, showing the setback style

During the 1920s and 1930s many skyscrapers were designed in an Art Deco style. (Note: The definition of architectural styles is usually imprecise. "Art Deco" was often termed "moderne" during the 1920s, and historians such as Daniel Abramson draw further contrast between styles during the period that stressed traditional, often Gothic features; classic Art Deco styles; and more minimalist versions towards the end of the period.) This architectural approach typically combined what Carol Willis terms an "aesthetic of simple, sculptural mass" with the use of rich colour and ornamentation on the surfaces of the buildings. The aim was to call attention to the increasingly complex three-dimensional shape of the skyscraper, in contrast to earlier styles which could be critiqued, as historian Larry Ford suggests, as being merely "short buildings made taller with additional stories". Windows were de-emphasised in favour of creating a strong sense of shape and mass, the surrounding walls treated as textured fabric, dressing the building underneath. Skyscrapers of this period typically lost their ornamental horizontal divisions, being broken up by physical changes in their shape as one looked up the building, the whole forming a striking silhouette.

In New York, the 1916 act to allow light and air to reach the streets encouraged a stepped or ziggurat approach to skyscraper design; this "set-back" style often made unrestricted use of the 25 percent of the site allowed by law to complete with a very tall tower. This encouraged a diversity of buildings, while maintaining an element of harmony and consistency of style. The Paramount Building and 120 Wall Street, for example, were constructed in the set-back style without towers, partially because the limited size of the sites would have made the towers relatively narrow and – when packed with the necessary elevators and service facilities – economically unviable. Many other skyscrapers built on larger or more expensive plots opted for the tallest towers possible, including the $24 million ($3.8 billion in 2010 terms) Bank of Manhattan Building at 40 Wall Street and the City Bank-Farmers Trust Company Building at 20 Exchange Place. New York continued its lead in tall skyscrapers throughout the period; in 1920 it had ten times the number of tall buildings than its nearest rival Chicago.

Some New York skyscrapers complemented traditional, cubicle offices linked by corridors, with larger, more open-plan spaces called "general offices". These maximised the number of workers that could be fitted into a given space and provided for greater flexibility. Expensive corporate suites were also created during the 1930s, especially on Wall Street, typically on the highest levels of the buildings. These were used by the corporate executives and were usually lavishly outfitted in a range of traditional and exotic styles. The lobbies of these skyscrapers remained grand affairs, although some banks now eschewed renting out space to shops and restaurants in favour of a more exclusive atmosphere. The largest skyscrapers held up to 16,000 workers, although between 5,000 and 10,000 was more common, and the buildings held a wide range of services to support them, including beauty salons, private luncheon clubs, chiropodists and gymnasiums. A skyscraper such as the Cities Service Building at 70 Pine Street directly employed over 200 staff to manage and protect the property. The technology within the offices also grew still more sophisticated, with dictating, automatic typing and tabulating machines being used by teams of ever more specialised office workers. (Note: In 1895, there were 15 well-defined roles in U.S. offices, with generalised labels such as clerks, office boys and bookkeepers; by 1922 increased specialisation meant that this had risen to 22, and by 1940 over a hundred distinct roles existed, including accountants, auditors, payroll clerks, stenographers, receptionists, machine operators and file clerks.)

=== Chicago's towers ===
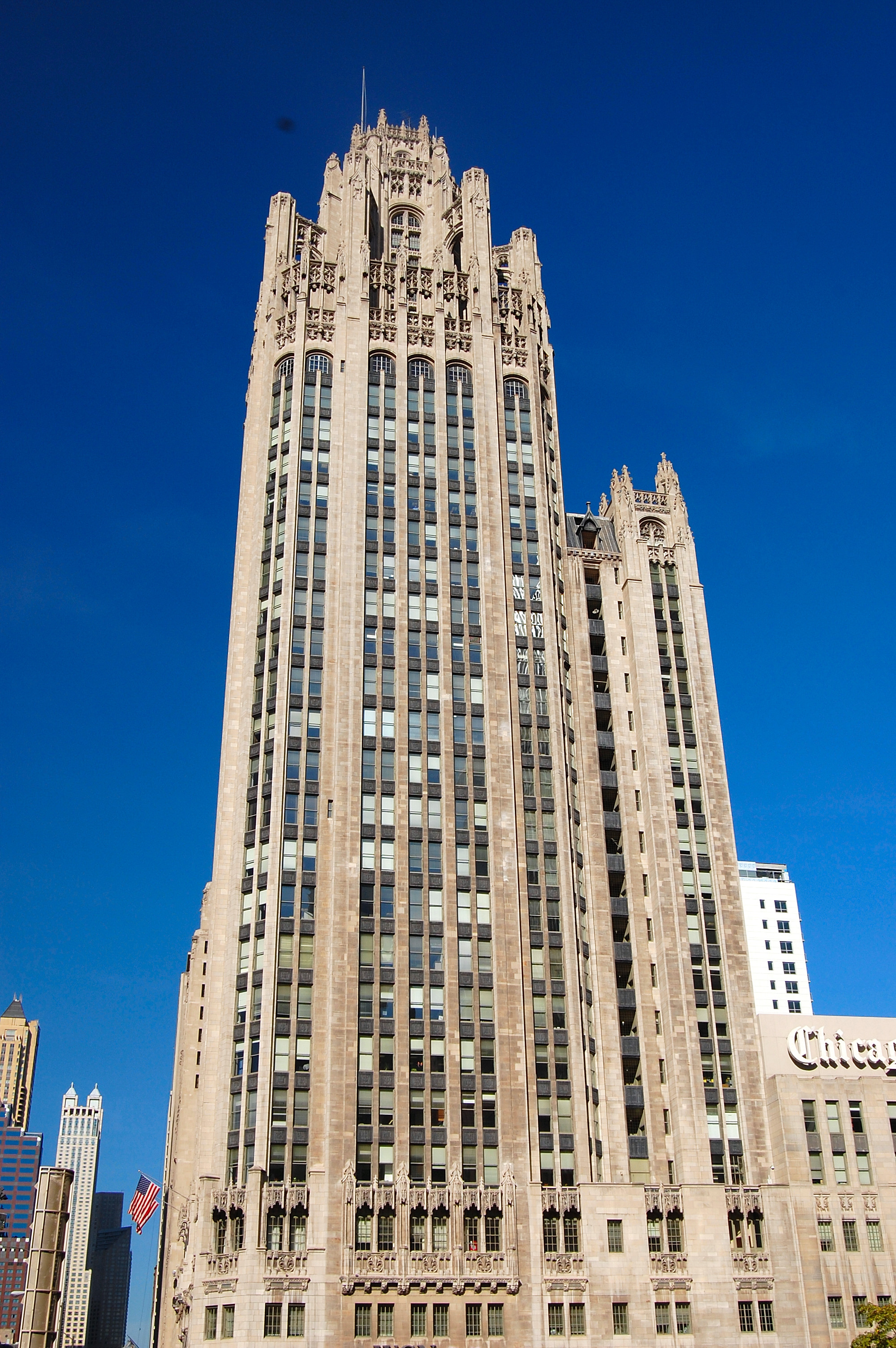
The Tribune Tower was one of the most famous buildings of the 1920s

Chicago altered its laws in the 1920s to allow towers to be built as part of its skyscrapers. In 1920, the maximum building height in Chicago was increased to 260 feet (79 m), and unoccupied structures on a building, such as ornamental towers, were allowed to extend up to 400 feet (120 m) high. Additional changes came in 1923, with taller occupied towers being permitted for the first time, but subject to controls on overall volumes. The main building of a skyscraper could be up to 264 feet (80 m) tall, and a tower could be built on up to 25 percent of the lot, but the tower could not have a volume of more than a sixth of the main block. In practice, this meant that a tower could not be built more than around 20 stories tall in a typical Chicago skyscraper development.

Initially, Chicago still preferred palazzo-styled buildings with large light courts in the centre, because they remained the most profitable designs. The Wrigley Building, built under the 1920 law, demonstrated the effect of two ornamental towers on top of a skyscraper. Under the revised law, the Straus Building and the Pittsfield Building took the palazzo design and added somewhat stunted towers on top in the early 1920s, producing profitable buildings.

One of the period's most famous buildings, the Tribune Tower, emerged from a competition held by the Tribune Company in 1922 to celebrate its 75th anniversary. The newspaper was one of the largest in the world and used the competition, in which members of the public were invited to influence the design of the skyscraper, to build a loyal following amongst its readership and generate free publicity. The final design was determined by a competition panel largely made up of the company's appointees, who chose John Howells and Raymond Hood's tower design. The resulting tower was a conservative, Gothic design and controversy about the decision broke out almost immediately: Louis Sullivan and many others criticized Howells and Hood's design as being derivative of the Woolworth Tower. Regardless of its critics, the Tribune received as many as 20,000 visitors to its observation gallery when it opened in 1925. The unbuilt second-place entry in the competition, a more simplified stepped-back design by Eliel Saarinen, also proved highly influential.

The popularity of the older style then began to wane in favor of a greater emphasis on towers. One common way of building these within Chicago's laws was to build a square main block with a central service core, and then simply place a tower on the top; the more massive the main block, the taller the tower could be. The Trustees System Service Building and the Foreman State National Bank Building form good examples of this approach. Alternatively, the front of the main block could be recessed, as at the Chicago Civic Opera Building or the LaSalle-Wacker Building, sacrificing volume but producing the visual effect of two high wings flanking a very tall tower. The distinctive New York "setback" style was not adopted in Chicago, the only example of this style being the Palmolive Building on North Michigan Avenue.

=== Great Depression ===
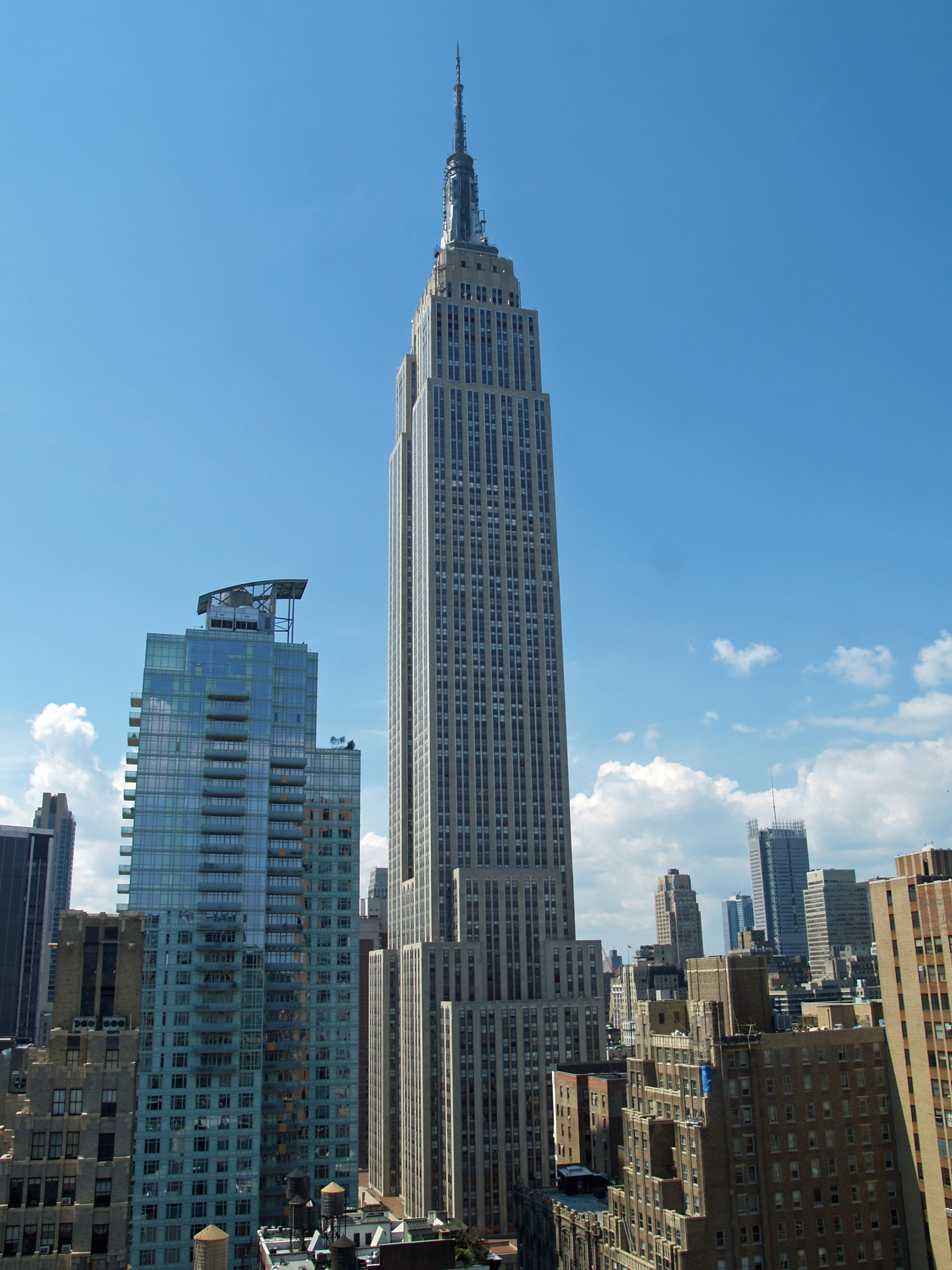
The Empire State Building in 2007

The boom in skyscraper construction began to falter following the Wall Street crash of 1929, with fast economic growth giving way to the slump years of the Great Depression: construction of all sorts slowed considerably. The real estate market that lay behind new skyscraper builds collapsed, and the value of many properties dropped dramatically: the American Insurance Union tower cost $8 million ($1.2 billion in 2010 terms) to build in 1927, but was valued at only $3.5 million ($900 million) by 1933; 40 Wall Street defaulted on its debts in 1935 and was put on sale for just $1.2 million ($240 m). (Note: Put on sale for $1.2 million, 40 Wall Street was valued at less than the original cost of its elevators. Skyscraper values during the Depression years should be seen against a context of deflation and a shrinking economy.) The major bond house of S.W. Straus, behind many successful developments, defaulted on the $214 million ($47 billion) in bonds held by 60,000 investors; the Van Swerigan developer brothers went bankrupt. Vacancy rates began to increase as the recession bit, increasing from only one percent in central New York in early 1920 to 17 percent in 1931 and 25 percent by 1934.

In the face of the recession, some skyscrapers projects were canceled or scaled back. Plans by the Metropolitan Life company to build a 100-story skyscraper alongside their existing tower had been put forward in 1929, but were shelved in the face of the recession and public criticism of such expenditure in the economic climate. Instead the first phase of the project, known as the North Building ended up only 32 stories high in 1932 and the building, even at this height, was only fully completed in 1950. In many other cases, projects which had already been commissioned continued through to completion. This resulted in 26,000,000 square feet (2,400,000 m^{2}) of new office space being added to New York between 1931 and 1934 even after the start of the recession, adding to the problem of underoccupancy. Some of these buildings, however, became iconic structures, pushing the limits of skyscraper height sharply upwards.

The Chrysler Building was completed in 1930, just after the Depression began to affect the industry. Architect William Van Alen competed with the designers of 40 Wall Street to produce the tallest building in the world and famously erected the Chrysler spire in a last-minute, secret move in order to acquire the title for his own 69-story, 1,046-foot (319 m) tall building. The exterior was built of white and grey brick, but metal was used extensively to ornament it further, including gargoyles, nickel-chrome eagles' heads, and a winged helmet of Mercury. The entrance used black granite to contrast with the nickel-chrome windows, and the foyer gave way to red marble and a mural ceiling. The design of each part of the building was individualist and distinct, with even each elevator different in design. A Chrysler showroom was placed on the first floor of the building and an observation deck and the exclusive "Cloud Club" on the upper levels.

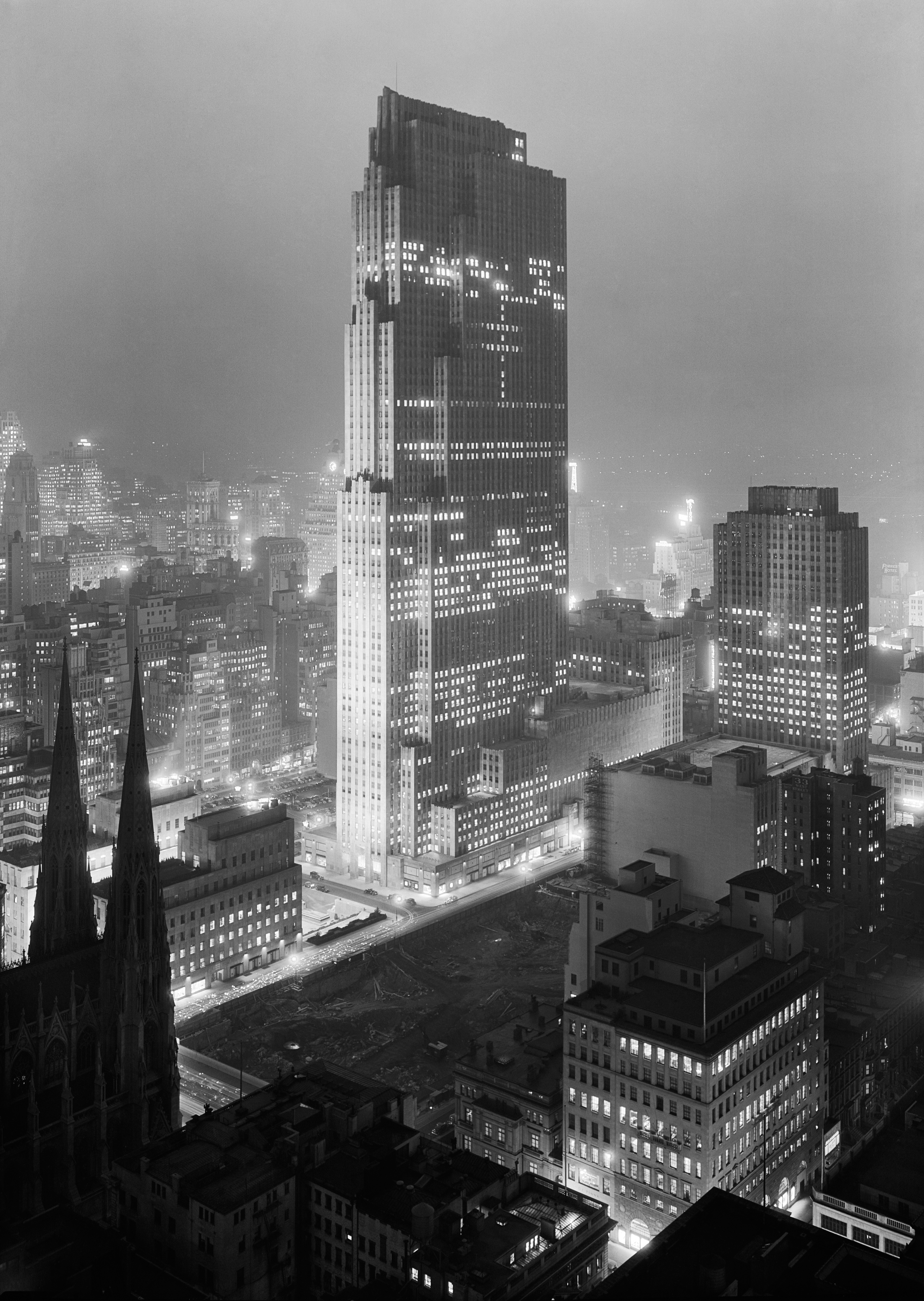
The construction of Rockefeller Center at night, 1933

The Empire State Building originated from a 1928 project to redevelop the original Waldorf–Astoria into a 50-story mixed-use development; the purchase of the site for $14 million ($2.1 billion) set a record in New York for the year. John Raskob and Pierre du Pont entered into the project as financial backers, and concluded that the project would be more profitable if the site was used to build an extremely tall 80-story skyscraper instead. Although revised financial estimates suggested that the height should be cut back, the cachet of having the world's tallest building was considerable, and instead an additional five stories were added to ensure the building, at 1,050 feet (320 m), would be slightly taller than the Chrysler Building. An observation deck was built to attract tourists, which proved to be a valuable source of revenue. The limestone, granite, and aluminium skyscraper was specially designed to be easily erected, with standardized paneling and structural fittings, and was completed in only 18 months, opening in 1931. Due to the recession, however, it was only 25 percent occupied throughout the 1930s and ran at a loss; critics dubbed it the "Empty State Building".

Rockefeller Center had originally been intended by John D. Rockefeller Jr. to be a new location for the Metropolitan Opera House, but the 1929 crash brought an end to the scheme. Rockefeller decided to develop a large office center instead, taking advantage of the low construction costs during the recession. At the center of the development was the RCA Building, heavily influenced by architect Raymond Hood. The long, slab-like RCA had two distinct axes – from one side, it appeared to be a narrow tower, from the other it rose like a sheer wall. Not only was the structure highly distinctive, but it was also economically very effective. The design maximized the available light to the offices and eliminated any darker internal rooms, as the core of the building was entirely taken up with elevators and other engineering services. It took until 1940 before all of the building had been filled by tenants.

In Chicago, the final pre-war skyscraper was built in 1934. The Field Building was commissioned during the final boom years of the inter-war economy, and the Home Insurance Building – the first skyscraper, built in 1884 – was demolished to make way for the "wing and tower"-style development.

=== Skyscraper mania and social commentary ===
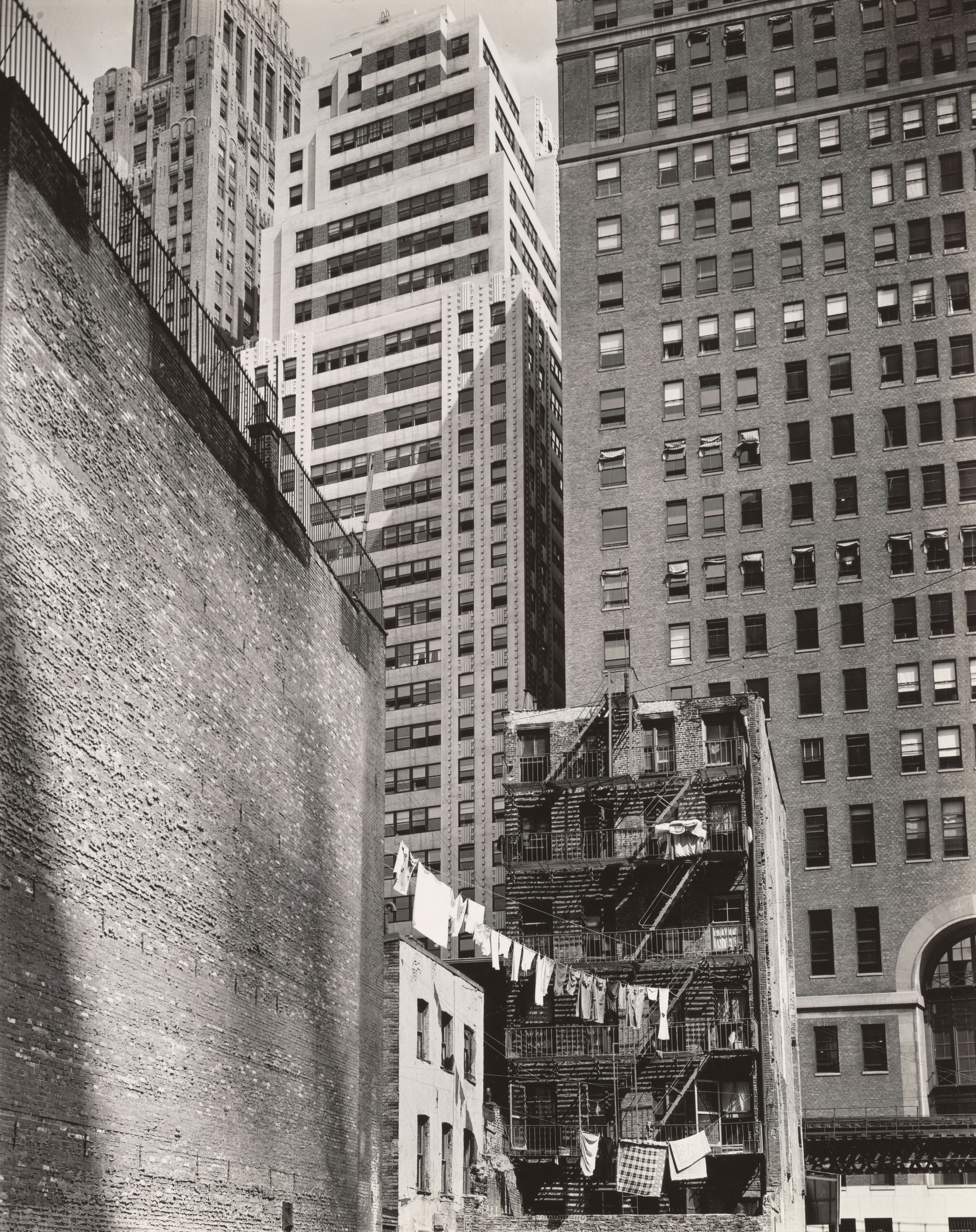
Berenice Abbott's depiction of changing Manhattan, 1936; Cunard Building (right)

Public interest in skyscrapers increased during the 1920s, particularly after the Tribune competition. The competition drawings were circulated on display, with 25,000 people coming to see them in Chicago in just one month. In the aftermath, images of skyscrapers flourished across American culture, commencing what historian Merrill Schleier dubbed a "skyscraper mania". The "Titan City" exhibition in 1925 celebrated existing skyscraper and featured futuristic murals by Harvey Corbett and Hugh Ferriss, depicting the skyscraper at the heart of the "City of the Future". Charles Sheeler and Paul Strand's 1921 short film Manhatta explored the form, ending with a sunset shot from the top of a skyscraper. Authors such as Janet Flanner, John Dos Passos and Mary Borden wrote novels with skyscrapers as important motifs or settings. John Carpenter produced a ballet on the theme. Paul Frankl designed a range of popular "skyscraper furniture".

Much of this commentary was positive, reflecting an optimism about technology and the direction of urban life in general. Skyscrapers were seen as an expression of rational engineering, the perfect buildings for mankind to live in, as celebrated in artist Louis Lozowick's lithographs. Some other proponents of skyscrapers likened them to medieval cathedrals, symbols of the modern age. Poems depicted skyscrapers as objects of sublime, rational beauty, Ferris describing them as "buildings like crystals, walls of translucent glass, sheer glass blocks sheathing a steel grill". At Chicago's Century of Progress exposition in 1933, skyscrapers and technology were portrayed as a solution for the United States' current and future problems. The French-Swiss architect Le Corbusier acclaimed New York in 1935 as being "overwhelming, amazing, exciting, violently alive", but went on to complain that there were still too few skyscrapers, and those that had been built were not yet tall enough. Lewis Hine, employed to record the building of the Empire State Building, portrayed the skyscraper construction teams as courageous heroes, creating a genre of photography that continued up until 1941.

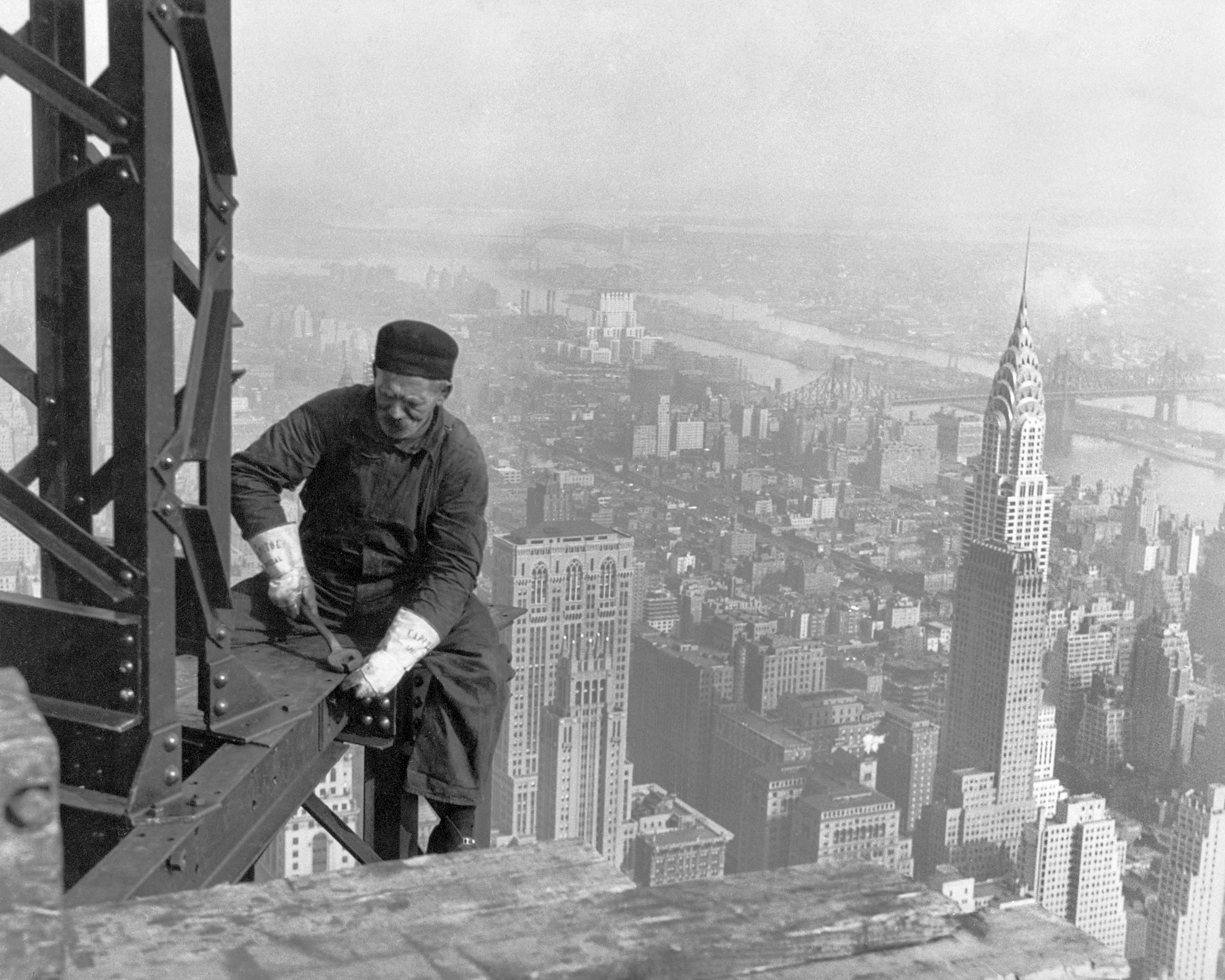
A worker constructing the Empire State Building in 1930, overlooking the Chrysler Building in the background, by Lewis Hine

Their critics expressed concerns about the effect of modern technology and urban living on the human condition, arguing that skyscrapers generated pollution and noise, and imposed a regimented and dehumanising lifestyle on the people that worked in them. Social commentator Lewis Mumford reflected the concerns of many in his critiques entitled Is the Skyscraper Tolerable? and The Intolerable City. Political theorist Stefan Hirsch condemned the buildings as "bandages covering the sky, stifling our breath". Inventor Thomas Edison expressed fears that an uncontrolled expansion of skyscrapers would result in overcrowding and disaster. Artist Howard Cook's engravings critiqued the oppressive character of the new skyscrapers as they loomed over the traditional city. Berenice Abbott's photographic studies of New York in the 1930s explored the complex theme of urban change and the effect of skyscrapers on the older ways of life in the city, echoing Steigler's work in the first decade of the century.

Hollywood used skyscrapers extensively in popular films. The Skyscrapers of New York in 1906 became the first of many, and in the 1920s Harold Lloyd produced his five "skyscraper films", most prominently Safety Last!, in which the hero dangles from a clock on the side of a Los Angeles building. In these early silent movies, skyscrapers were closely associated with masculine identity; Lloyd's climbing of skyscrapers closely associated with his characters' transformation from young men into mature adults, and the winning of the heroine. The 1933 film King Kong included another iconic use of the early skyscraper in its final scenes, as the giant ape scaled the Empire State Building shortly before his death; the scene can be interpreted as contrasting natural instinct with the insensitive rationality of the modern building and wider New York.

== Legacy ==
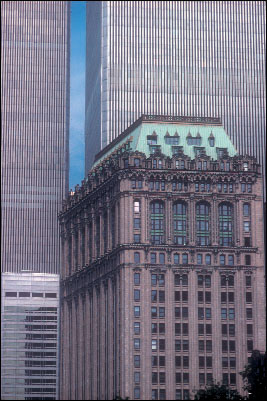
The West Street Building in 1988, overshadowed by the modernist World Trade Center

Skyscraper development paused during the years of World War II. Once development began again in the 1950s and 1960s, the skyscraper entered a different phase of development, usually called the international or modern period. Some experimental designs in this style had been built in the U.S. using European architectural concepts in the early 1930s, most notably the Philadelphia Savings Fund Society and McGraw-Hill Buildings. Post-war, their modernist themes were used in a new generation of skyscrapers. These stood alone on individual plots in the fashion of the Rockefeller Centre's RCA building, rather than as part of a row of buildings, forming huge slabs and towers featuring huge glass façades, breaking with the earlier, more ornate skyscraper traditions. Inside, new technologies such as fluorescent lighting and widespread air-conditioning meant that many older architectural features such as light courts and operable windows were unnecessary.

The trend had substantial implications for many early skyscrapers. Some were redesigned to fit new tastes. Much of the ornate detail was removed from the Metropolitan Life Tower in the 1960s, for example, to fit contemporary, plainer fashions. Many older skyscrapers could not be adapted, however, as they lacked the physical depth to build larger modern offices or the space for new service facilities. A few were demolished to make way for new, larger structures. Notable these was the Singer Tower, razed between 1967 and 1969 and replaced by the international style United States Steel Building. In the 21st century, buildings such as 90 West Street have been renovated as upmarket housing, because of their large windows in part and aesthetic quality.

Critical discussion of early skyscrapers began from the 1880s onwards in the architectural community and continued across a growing cultural and academic community in the inter-war period. In 1930, the terms the Chicago "school" and "movement" began to be used for the first time, popularised by the 1940s academics Sigfried Giedion and Carl Condit as a label for the early Chicago architects. They regarded skyscrapers as the early forerunners of modernism and as marking a clear break with earlier architectural forms in the U.S. This interpretation of Chicago's skyscrapers was later challenged by Robert Bruegmann and Daniel Bluestone, who argued that it underplayed the links of the movement to pre-existing Chicago culture. During the 1980s and 1990s, analysis of the early skyscrapers increasingly shifted away from the architects and architecture of the individual buildings to considerations of skyscrapers' roles in the wider urban context. Histories stressing the social, economic, and cultural dimension of skyscrapers began to be produced, with New York's skyscrapers receiving greater attention than before. The Skyscraper Museum – the first to address the theme – was founded in New York in 1997 by historian Carol Willis to preserve the history of the skyscraper.

== See also ==
- Architecture of the United States
- Early Chicago Skyscrapers – a nomination for UNESCO's World Heritage Site list
- History of the world's tallest buildings
- List of early skyscrapers

== Bibliography ==
- Abramson, Daniel M. (2001). Skyscraper Rivals: the AIG Building and the Architecture of Wall Street. New York: Princeton Architectural Press. ISBN 9781568982441.
- American Art Publishing (1918). New York: the Wonder City. New York: American Art Publishing Co. OCLC 52292672.
- Angle, Paul M. (1956). The Chicago Historical Society 1856 – 1956: An Unconventional Chronicle. New York, Chicago, and San Francisco: Rand McNally.
- Binder, George (2006). Tall Buildings of Europe, The Middle East And Africa. Victoria, Australia: Images Publishing. ISBN 9781876907815.
- Bluestone, Daniel (1991). Constructing Chicago. New Haven, Connecticut, and London: Yale University Press. ISBN 9780300048483.
- Bragdon, Charles (2003) [First published 1909]. "Architecture in the United States III: The Skyscraper". In Shepherd, Roger (ed.). Skyscraper: the Search for an American Style, 1891–1941. New York: McGraw-Hill. ISBN 0071369708.
- Bruegmann, Robert (1997). The Architects and the City: Holabird and Roche of Chicago, 1880–1918. Chicago: University of Chicago Press. ISBN 9780226076959.
- Clark, W. C.; Kingston, John Lyndhurst (1930). The Skyscraper: a Study in the Economic Height of Modern Office Buildings. New York: American Institute of Steel Construction. OCLC 1032783.
- Clark, Lyndhurst (1991). "Canadian Cities: Recent Developments and the Changing Image". In Robinson, Guy M. (ed.). A Social Geography of Canada (Revised ed.). Toronto: Dundurn Press. ISBN 9781550020922.
- Condit, Carl W. (1968). American Building: Materials and Techniques from the Beginning of the Colonial Settlements to the Present. Chicago and London: University of Chicago Press. OCLC 600614625.
- Cronon, William (1992). Nature's Metropolis: Chicago and the Great West. New York: Norton. ISBN 9780393308730.
- Douglas, George H. (1996). Skyscrapers: a Social History of the Very Tall Building in America. Jefferson, North Carolina: McFarland. ISBN 9780786420308.
- Fenske, Gail (2005). "The Beaux-Arts Architect and the Skyscraper: Cass Gilbert, the Professional Engineer, and the Rationalization of Construction in Chicago and New York". In Moudry, Roberta (ed.). The American Skyscraper: Cultural Histories. Cambridge: Cambridge University Press. ISBN 9780521624213.
- Ferree, Barr (1893). "Economic Conditions of Architecture in America". In Stone, Alfred (ed.). Proceedings of the Twenty-Seventh Annual Convention of the American Institute of Architects. Chicago: Inland Architect Press. OCLC 793133310.
- Fine, Lisa M. (2005). "The Female 'Souls of the Skyscraper'". In Moudry, Roberta (ed.). The American Skyscraper: Cultural Histories. Cambridge: Cambridge University Press. ISBN 9780521624213.
- Flinn, John J. (1893). The Standard Guide of Chicago. Chicago: Standard Guide Company. OCLC 665222676.
- Ford, Larry R. (2005). Cities and Buildings: Skyscrapers, Skid Rows and Suburbs. Baltimore and London: The Johns Hopkins University Press. ISBN 9780801846472.
- Gallacci, Caroline Denyer; Karabaich, Ron (2009). Downtown Tacoma. Charleston, South Carolina: Arcadia. ISBN 9780738570020.
- Goldberger, Paul (1985). The Skyscraper. New York: Alfred A. Knopf. ISBN 0394715861.
- Goldin, Claudia; Katz, Lawrence F. (2008). The Race Between Education and Technology. Cambridge, Massachusetts: Harvard University Press. ISBN 9780674035300.
- Gray, Lee E. (2005). "Type and Building Type: Newspaper/Office Buildings in Nineteenth-Century New York". In Moudry, Roberta (ed.). The American Skyscraper: Cultural Histories. Cambridge: Cambridge University Press. ISBN 9780521624213.
- Hill, George (1904). "The Economy of the Office Building". Architectural Record. 15: 313–327.
- Holden Block (PDF) (Report). Chicago: City of Chicago Commission on Chicago Landmarks. March 3, 2011.
- Krinsky, Carol Herselle (2005). "The Skyscraper Ensemble in Its Urban Context: Rockefeller Center". In Moudry, Roberta (ed.). The American Skyscraper: Cultural Histories. Cambridge: Cambridge University Press. ISBN 9780521624213.
- Lamb, Charles Rollinson (1898). "Civic Architecture from Its Constructive Side". Municipal Affairs. 2: 42–72.
- Landau, Sarah; Condit, Carl W. (1996). Rise of the New York Skyscraper, 1865–1913. New Haven, CT: Yale University Press. ISBN 978-0-300-07739-1. OCLC 32819286.
- Le Corbusier (1947). When the Cathedrals Were White. New York: Reynal and Hitchcock. OCLC 557745249.
- Moudry, Roberta (2005a). "Introduction". In Moudry, Roberta (ed.). The American Skyscraper: Cultural Histories. Cambridge: Cambridge University Press. ISBN 9780521624213.
- Moudry, Roberta (2005b). "The Corporate and the Civic: Metropolitan Life's Home Office Building". In Moudry, Roberta (ed.). The American Skyscraper: Cultural Histories. Cambridge: Cambridge University Press. ISBN 9780521624213.
- Page, Max (2005). "The Heights and Depths of Urbanism: Fifth Avenue and the Creative Destruction of Manhattan". In Moudry, Roberta (ed.). The American Skyscraper: Cultural Histories. Cambridge: Cambridge University Press. ISBN 9780521624213.
- Paperny, Vladimir (2002). Architecture in the Age of Stalin: Culture Two. Translated by Roann Barris. Cambridge: Cambridge University Press. ISBN 978-0-521-45119-2.
- Porter, Darwin; Prince, Danforth (2010). Frommer's England 2010. Frommer's. ISBN 9780470470701.
- Ramirez, Juan (2004). Architecture for the Screen: a Critical Study of Set Design in Hollywood's Golden Age. Jefferson, North Carolina: MacFarland. ISBN 9780786417810.
- Revell, Keith D. (2005). "Law Makes Order: The Search for Ensemble in the Skyscraper City, 1890–1930". In Moudry, Roberta (ed.). The American Skyscraper: Cultural Histories. Cambridge: Cambridge University Press. ISBN 9780521624213.
- Root, John W. (1890). "A Great Architectural Problem". Inland Architect and News Record. 15 (5): 67–71.
- Severini, Lois (1983). The Architecture of Finance: Early Wall Street. Ann Arbor, Michigan: UMI Research Press. ISBN 0835714586.
- Schleier, Merill (1986). The Skyscraper in American Art, 1890–1931. New York: Da Capo Press. ISBN 0306803852.
- Schleier, Merill (2009). Skyscraper Cinema: Architecture and Gender in American Film. Minneapolis: University of Minnesota Press. ISBN 9780816642816.
- Schuyler, Montgomery (1961). American Architecture and Other Writings. Vol. 2. Cambridge, Massachusetts: Belknap Press of Harvard University Press. OCLC 312509850.
- Shepherd, Roger, ed. (2003). Skyscraper: the Search for an American Style, 1891–1941. New York: McGraw-Hill. ISBN 0071369708.
- Solomonson, Katherine (2005). "The Chicago Tribune Tower Competition: Publicity Imagines Community". In Moudry, Roberta (ed.). The American Skyscraper: Cultural Histories. Cambridge: Cambridge University Press. ISBN 9780521624213.
- Solomonson, Katherine (2001). The Chicago Tribune Tower Competition: Skyscraper Design and Cultural Changes in the 1920s. Chicago: University of Chicago Press. ISBN 9780226768007.
- Stanborough, Rebecca (2016). The Great Pyramid of Giza. Oxford, England: Raintree. ISBN 9781474711777.
- Tobriner, Stephen (2006). Bracing for disaster: earthquake-resistant architecture and engineering in San Francisco, 1838–1933. Berkeley, California: Heyday. ISBN 1597140252.
- Walter, Richard J. (1993). Politics and Urban Growth in Buenos Aires, 1910–1942. Cambridge: Cambridge University Press. ISBN 9780521530651.
- Watkin, David (2005). A History of Western Architecture (4th ed.). London: Lawrence King Publishing. ISBN 9781856694599.
- Willis, Carol (1995). Form Follows Finance: Skyscrapers and Skylines in New York and Chicago. New York: Princeton Architectural Press. ISBN 9781568980447.
- Wolner, Edward W. (2005). "Chicago's Fraternity Temples: the Origins of Skyscraper Rhetoric and the First of the World's Tallest Office Buildings". In Moudry, Roberta (ed.). The American Skyscraper: Cultural Histories. Cambridge: Cambridge University Press. ISBN 9780521624213.
