= Research in Globalization =

Social science journal

- Discipline: Globalization
- Language: English
- Edited by: Johan Fischer; Guy Robinson

Publication details
- History: Since 2019
- Publisher: Elsevier
- Open access: Yes
- ISO 4: Find out here

Indexing
- ISSN: 2590-051X

Links
- Journal homepage

Research in Globalization (Note: Also cited as Research in Globalisation (British spelling).) is a peer-reviewed, open-access, scholarly journal on globalization that allows submissions from across the social sciences. It is published by Elsevier and issued its first volume in December 2019. As of 2025, the co–editors-in-chief are Johan Fischer of Roskilde University and Guy Robinson of the University of Adelaide. Its associate editor is Moinak Maiti at the University of the Witwatersrand. The journal is listed in the Directory of Open Access Journals.

Upon its founding, Robinson was the sole editor-in-chief of the journal. In 2019 through 2021, Research in Globalization published one issue per year, in December. Since 2022, it has published an issue in June and December.

The 2024 edition of Journal Citation Reports gave Research in Globalization an impact factor of 3.7. Within the Emerging Sources Citation Index, the journal ranked 84/620 (first quartile, Q1) in the category of economics, 66/193 in environmental studies (Q2), and 15/273 in "social science, interdisciplinary" (Q1). As calculated by Scopus in May 2025, Research in Globalization has a CiteScore of 6.6, ranking it in the 89th percentile for urban studies sources. SCImago Journal Rank also ranks the journal, placing it in the first quartile of the "development" category in 2022, 2023, and 2024. The Library of Congress includes Research in Globalization as a periodical on its research guide to globalization.
