= Guy M. Robinson =

Human geographer (born 1951)

Guy Martin Robinson (born 1951) is a British academic in the field of human geography. He presently holds positions at the University of Adelaide as an emeritus professor and at the University of Cambridge as a departmental fellow, and also serves as co–editor-in-chief of the Elsevier journal Research in Globalization.

Robinson was born in 1951, and according to his LinkedIn profile attended Lapal County Primary School from 1957 to 1963, and King Edward VI Grammar School, Stourbridge (now King Edward VI College, Stourbridge) from 1963 to 1970. He later attended the University of London from 1970 to 1973, from which he received a BSc in geography, and the University of Oxford (Jesus College) from 1973 to 1977, from which he received his DPhil in geography.

His research focuses on the field of human geography, as he has published on landscape restoration in England, the transformation of rural China due to the country's economic development, as well as on social geography in Canada. (Note: The book referenced here was edited by Robinson in honor of J. Wreford Watson and received multiple academic reviews.) As of 2018, he is a Fellow of the Royal Geographical Society. In 2025, he was awarded fellowship of the Institute of Australian Geographers in recognition of "sustained and significant contributions" to the discipline of geography by an institute member.

From 1979 to 1994, Robinson lectured at the University of Edinburgh. He was also a professor at Kingston University London from 1994 to 2008. He moved to Australia that year to direct the Centre for Rural Health and Community Development at the University of South Australia, which he did until 2015. Robinson has held an appointment at the University of Adelaide since that year. As of 2025, he is an emeritus professor at that university, and at the University of Cambridge serves as a senior fellow in the Department of Land Economy and a fellow at LISA, a geographic information lab housed within the department. He is an honorary professor at Shaanxi University of Technology in China. Robinson also served for twelve years as the editor of the Elsevier journal Land Use Policy, and since 2019 has held that role in an emeritus capacity. Beginning in 2019, he was the founding editor and is now, as of 2025, one of two editors-in-chief of the journal Research in Globalization, an open access social science journal. His books have been used in the curricula for college courses internationally.

== Books ==
- Robinson, Guy M. (1988). Agricultural Change. North British Publishing. ISBN 978-0-9513770-0-0.
- —— (1990). Conflict and Change in the Countryside. Belhaven Press. ISBN 978-1-85293-043-1.
- —— (1998). Methods and Techniques in Human Geography. Wiley. ISBN 978-0-471-96231-1.
- ——; Loughran, Robert J.; Tranter, Paul J. (2000). Australia and New Zealand: Economy, Society and Environment. Arnold. ISBN 978-0-340-72033-2.
- —— (2003). Geographies of Agriculture. Routledge. doi:10.4324/9781315839509. ISBN 978-1-315-83950-9.
- ——, ed. (2008). Sustainable Rural Systems. Routledge. doi:10.4324/9781315611556. ISBN 978-1-315-61155-6.
- ——; Carson, Doris A., eds. (2016). Handbook on the Globalisation of Agriculture. Edward Elgar Publishing. doi:10.4337/9780857939838. ISBN 978-0-85793-983-8.
- —— (2024). Transforming Rural China. Edward Elgar Publishing. doi:10.4337/9781803928586. ISBN 978-1-80392-858-6.
