= List of early skyscrapers =

This list of early skyscrapers details a range of tall, commercial buildings built between 1880 and the 1930s, predominantly in the United States cities of New York City and Chicago, but also across the rest of the U.S. and in many other parts of the world.

== The first skyscrapers (1880–1899) ==
=== United States ===
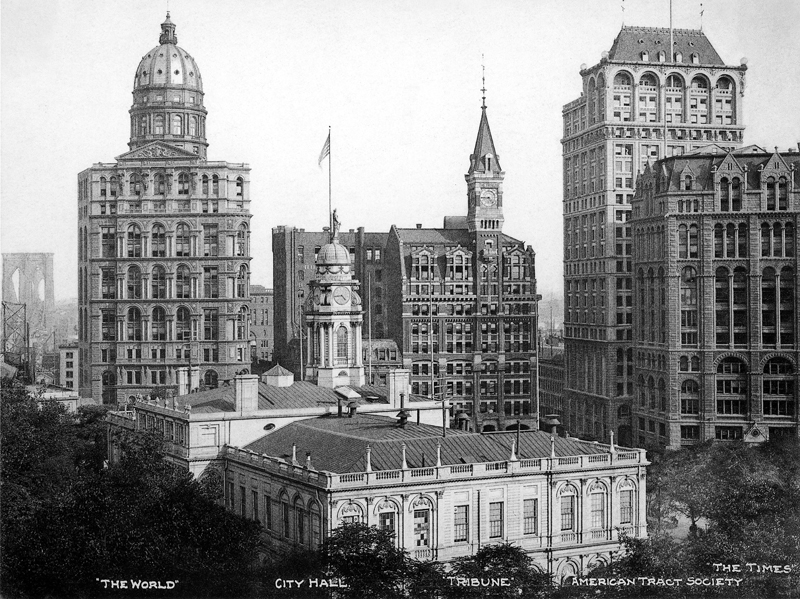
New York's "Newspaper Row", showing skyscrapers built in the late 19th century: (l. to r.) World Building, Tribune Building, 150 Nassau Street, and the Times Building.

California

- Central Tower
- Old Chronicle Building

==== Georgia ====
- Equitable Building
- Flatiron Building
- J. Mack Robinson College of Business Administration Building

==== Illinois ====
- Fisher Building
- Home Insurance Building
- Manhattan Building
- Marquette Building
- Marshall Field and Company Building
- Masonic Temple
- Monadnock Building
- New York Life Insurance Building
- Old Colony Building
- Rand McNally Building
- Reliance Building
- Rookery Building
- Tacoma Building

==== Iowa ====
- Observatory Building

==== Massachusetts ====
- Ames Building
- Fiske Building
- Winthrop Building

==== Michigan ====
- United Way Community Services Building
- Hammond Building
- Majestic Building

==== Minnesota ====
- Metropolitan Building
- Pioneer Building

==== Missouri ====
- Wainwright Building

==== New York ====
===== New York City =====
- American Tract Society Building
- American Surety Building
- Bayard–Condict Building
- Bowling Green Offices Building
- Empire Building
- Gillender Building
- Hotel Chelsea
- Hotel Gerard
- Manhattan Life Insurance Building
- New York Times Building
- New York Tribune Building
- New York World Building
- Osborne Apartments
- Park Row Building
- St. Paul Building
- Temple Court Building
- The Ansonia

===== Rochester =====
- Wilder Building

===== Buffalo =====
- Ellicott Square Building
- Guaranty Building

==== Pennsylvania ====
- Land Title Building
- North American Building

==== Utah ====
- Joseph Smith Memorial Building
- Judge Building
- Kearns Building

==== Wisconsin ====
- Milwaukee City Hall
- Pabst Building

==== Washington, D.C. ====
- Sun Building
- The Cairo

=== Rest of the world ===
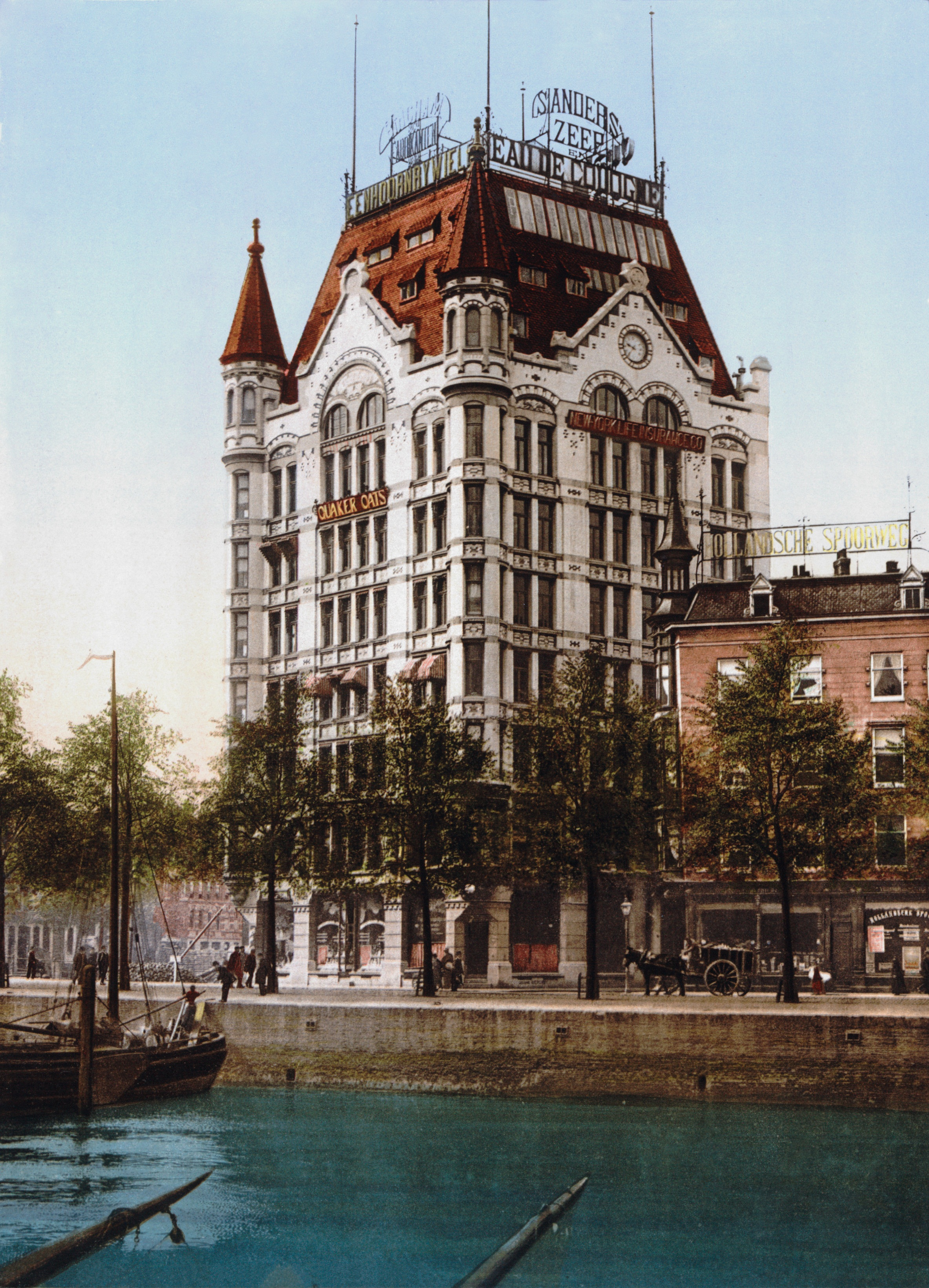
The Witte Huis in Rotterdam, Europe's first skyscraper building (1898)

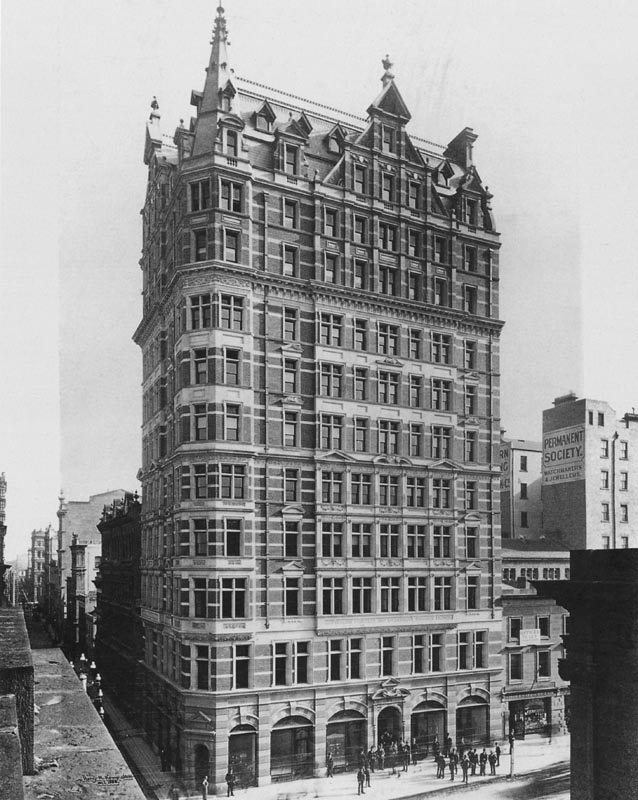
The APA "Australia" Building in Melbourne (1889–1980) – Australia's tallest building until 1912

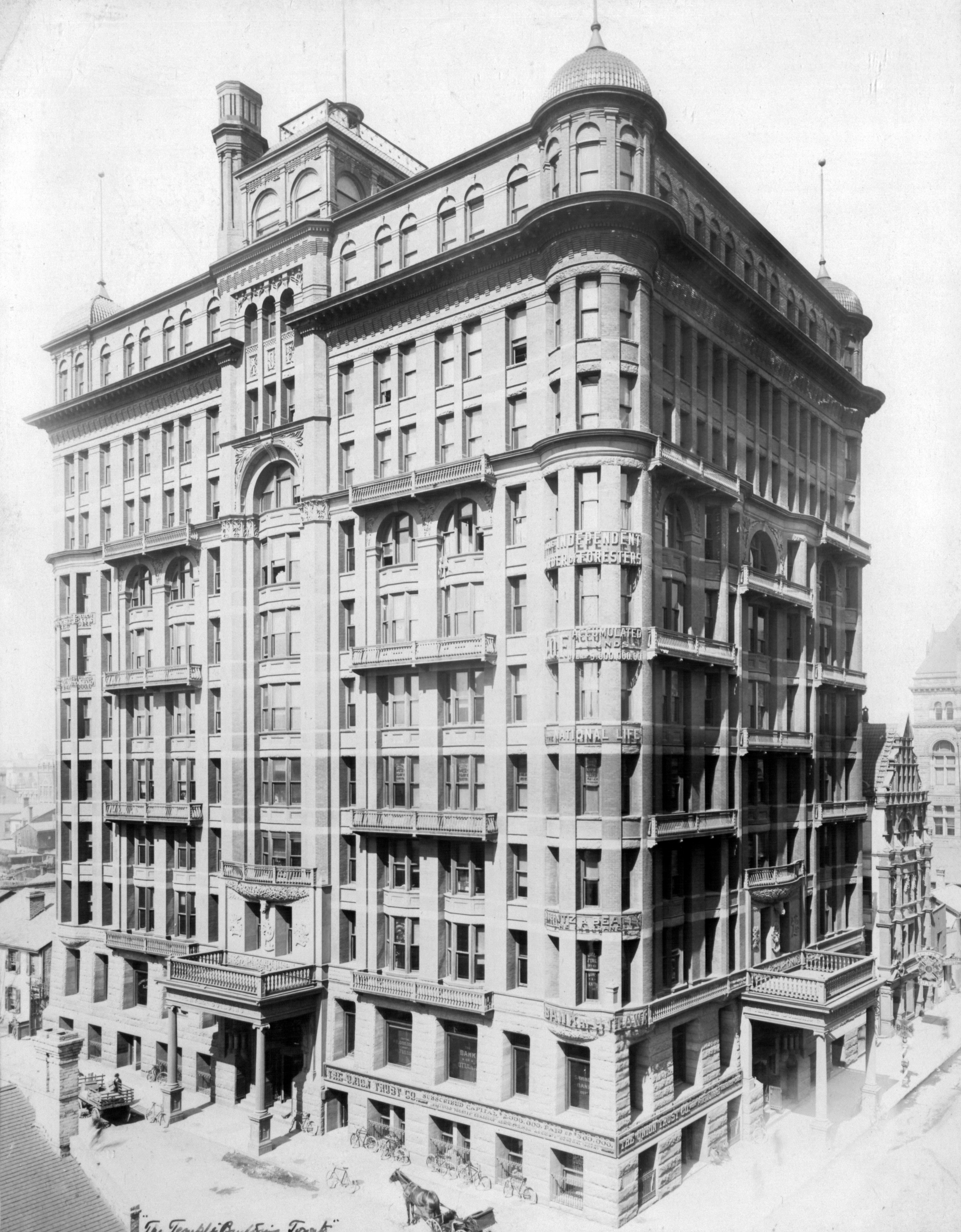
The Temple Building, Toronto (1895-96)

==== Asia ====
===== Japan =====
- Ryounkaku

==== Europe ====
===== Netherlands =====
- Witte Huis

===== United Kingdom =====
- Queen Anne's Mansions

==== North and South America ====
===== Canada =====
- Beard Building, Toronto
- Canada Life Building, Montreal
- New York Life Insurance Building, Montreal
- Temple Building, Toronto
- Toronto Board of Trade Building

==== Oceania ====
===== Australia =====
- APA Building, Melbourne

== The "First Great Age" (1900–19) ==
=== United States ===
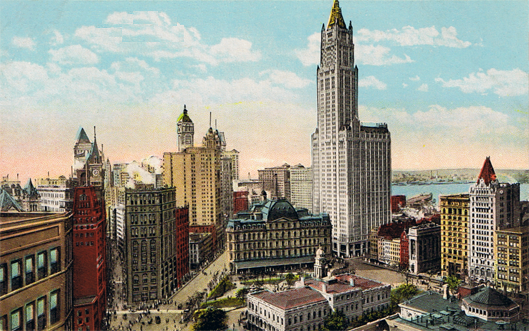
The Woolworth Building overlooking New York City's Old Post Office and City Hall Park, with the peaks of the Singer Tower and the 14 Wall Street just visible (left)

==== Alabama ====
- City Federal Building
- Empire Building

==== California ====
- Bank of America Building
- Hobart Building
- Merchants Exchange Building
- Oakland City Hall

==== Colorado ====
- Daniels & Fisher Tower

==== Connecticut ====
- Travelers Tower

==== Florida ====
- 121 Atlantic Place
- American National Bank Building (Pensacola, Florida)
- Dyal–Upchurch Building
- Florida Life Building

==== Georgia ====
- Candler Building (Atlanta)
- J. Mack Robinson College of Business Administration Building
- Lamar Building

==== Illinois ====
- Brooks Building
- Chicago Building
- Continental Illinois
- Hotel Aurora (Aurora, Illinois)
- Peoples Gas Building
- Renaissance Blackstone Hotel
- Roanoke Building
- Santa Fe Building

==== Iowa ====
- Fleming Building
- Liberty Building

==== Indiana ====
- 110 East Washington Street
- Barnes and Thornburg Building
- Fletcher Trust Building
- One North Pennsylvania

==== Maryland ====
- Baltimore Gas and Electric Company Building
- Emerson Bromo-Seltzer Tower
- Equitable Building (Baltimore)
- One Calvert Plaza

==== Massachusetts ====
- Custom House Tower

==== Michigan ====
- AT&T Michigan Headquarters
- Book Tower
- Chrysler House
- David Whitney Building
- Ford Building
- Kales Building
- Marquette Building
- Michigan Central Station
- Penobscot Building Annex
- Vinton Building

==== Minnesota ====
- Commerce Building (Saint Paul, Minnesota)
- The Saint Paul Hotel

==== Missouri ====
- Commerce Trust Building
- Railway Exchange Building (St. Louis)

==== Nebraska ====
- First National Bank Building (Omaha, Nebraska)

==== New York ====
===== New York City =====
- 1 Wall Street Court
- 14 Wall Street
- 49 Chambers
- 90 West Street
- 150 Nassau Street
- 195 Broadway
- American Surety Building
- Bank of the Metropolis Building
- Bowling Green Offices Building
- Broad Exchange Building
- Broadway–Chambers Building
- Bush Tower
- City Investing Building
- Consolidated Edison Building
- Empire Building
- Equitable Building
- Equitable Life Building
- Flatiron Building
- Germania Life Insurance Company Building
- Gillender Building
- Home Life Building
- Hudson Terminal
- Liberty Tower
- Manhattan Life Insurance Building
- Manhattan Municipal Building
- Metropolitan Life Insurance Company Tower
- Morse Building
- New York Times Building
- New York Tribune Building
- New York World Building
- One Times Square
- Park Row Building
- Singer Building
- St. Paul Building
- Trinity and United States Realty Buildings
- Western Union Telegraph Building
- Whitehall Building
- Woolworth Building

===== Rochester =====
- Kodak Tower

===== Buffalo =====
- The Marin

==== Ohio ====
- Bartlett Building
- Federal Reserve Bank of Cleveland
- Fourth & Walnut Center
- LeVeque Tower
- Fourth and Vine Tower
- Rockefeller Building (Cleveland)

==== Pennsylvania ====
- Arrott Building
- Benedum-Trees Building
- Farmers Bank Building
- Frick Building
- Land Title Building
- Oliver Building
- The Bellevue-Stratford Hotel
- The Carlyle

==== Tennessee ====
- Exchange Building
- The Burwell

==== Texas ====
- Adolphus Hotel
- ALICO Building
- Kirby Building

==== Utah ====
- Walker Center

==== Virginia ====
- First National Bank Building

==== Washington ====
- Old National Bank Building
- Smith Tower

=== Elsewhere in the world ===
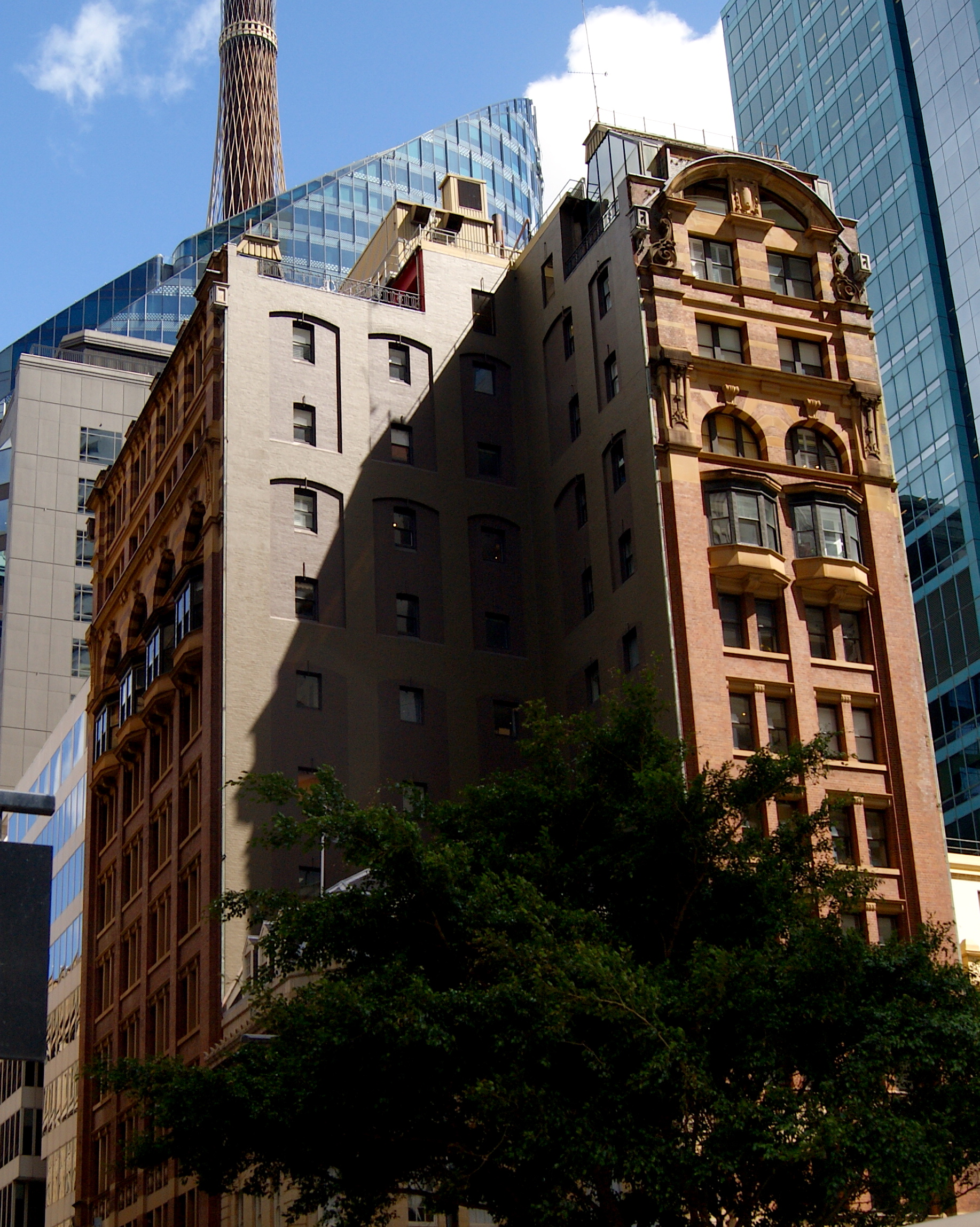
Culwulla Chambers, Sydney's first skyscraper

==== United Kingdom ====
- Royal Liver Building
- Tower Building, Liverpool

==== Argentina ====
- Galeria Guemes
- Archivo General de la Nacion
- Plaza Hotel Buenos Aires
- Railway Building

==== Australia ====
- Culwulla Chambers, Sydney
- Dovers Building, Melbourne
- Trust Building, Sydney

==== Brazil ====
- Edifício Jornal do Brasil

==== Canada ====
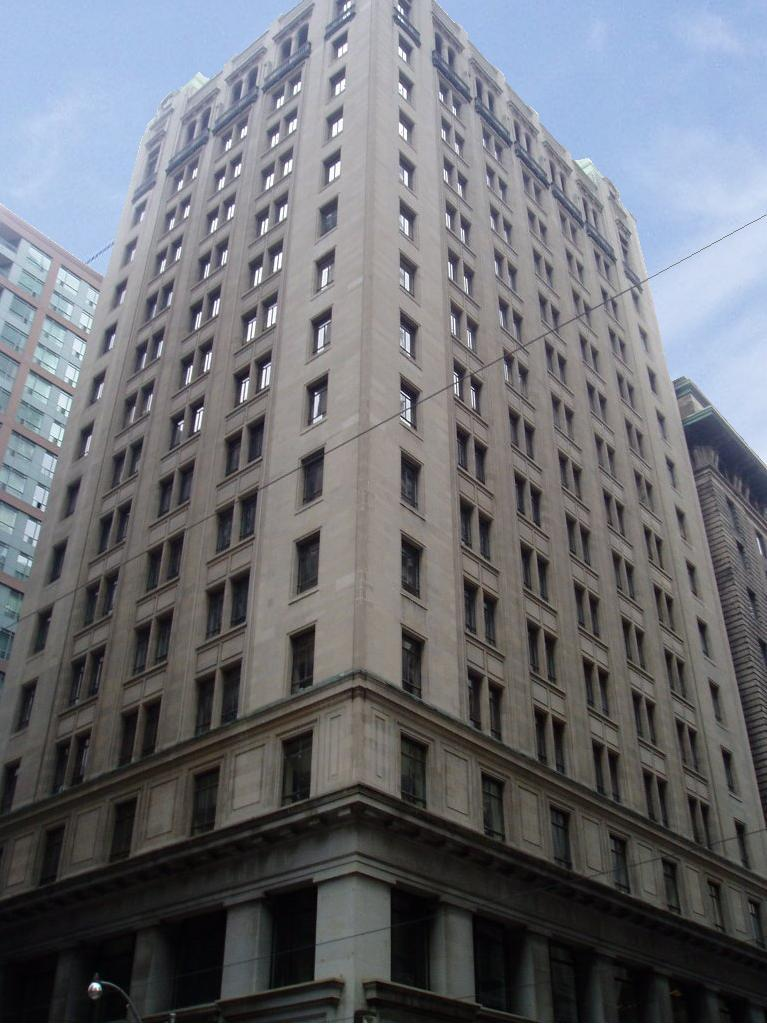
Canadian Pacific Building, Toronto

- Canadian Pacific Building, Toronto
- Confederation Building, Winnipeg
- Dominion Building, Vancouver
- Royal Bank Building, Toronto
- Sun Tower, Vancouver
- Trader's Bank Building, Toronto
- Union Bank Building, Winnipeg

==== Germany ====
===== Berlin =====
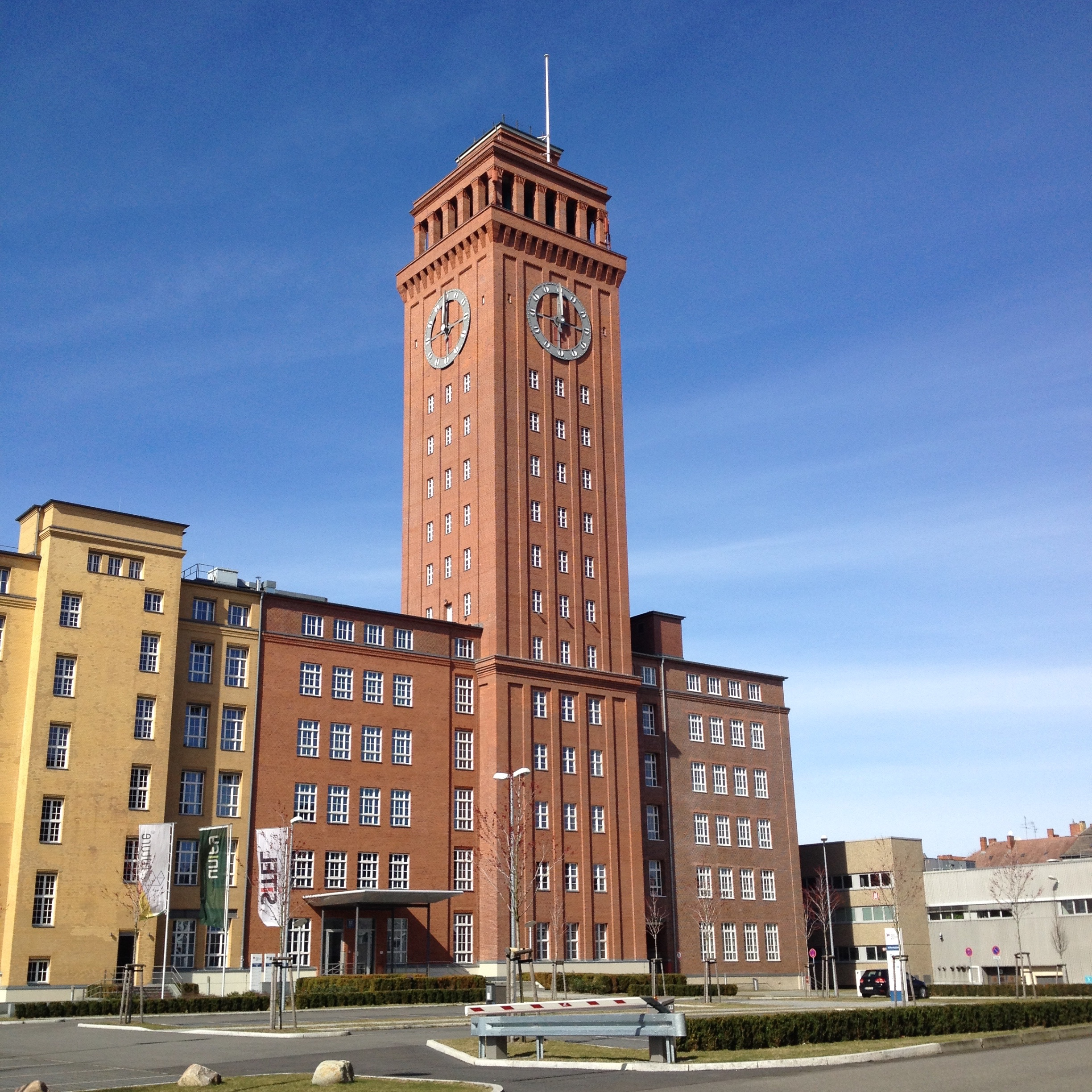
Siemensturm in Berlin

- Behrensbau
- Narva-Turm
- Siemensturm

===== Jena =====
- Zeiss Bau 15

==== Netherlands ====
- De Inktpot

==== New Zealand ====
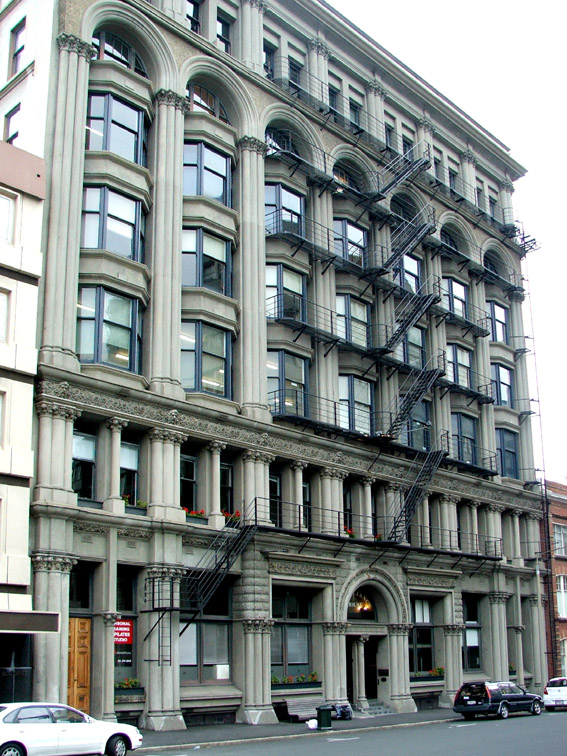
Consultancy House, Dunedin, New Zealand

- Consultancy House, Dunedin
- Public Trust Building, Wellington

==== Poland ====
- PAST (Poland)

==== Russia ====
- The fairy tale house

==== South Africa ====
- Union Buildings

==== Ukraine ====
- The Ginsburg skyscraper
- Fyodor Alyoshin's profitable house

== Inter-war period, boom and depression (1920–1939) ==
=== United States ===
==== Arizona ====
- Heard Building
- Hotel San Carlos (Phoenix)
- Luhrs Building
- Luhrs Tower
- Orpheum Lofts
- Pioneer Hotel
- Professional Building (Phoenix, Arizona)
- Valley National Bank Building (Tucson, Arizona)
- Westward Ho (Phoenix)

==== Connecticut ====
- Southern New England Telephone Company Administration Building
- The Stark Building
- Travelers Tower

==== California ====
- 140 New Montgomery
- 225 Bush Street
- 450 Sutter Street
- Bank of Italy (Fresno, California)
- El Cortez Hotel
- Los Angeles City Hall
- Pacific Southwest Building
- Richfield Tower
- Russ Building
- Shell Building
- Tribune Tower

==== Florida ====
- Freedom Tower (Miami)
- Miami Biltmore Hotel
- Miami-Dade County Courthouse

==== Georgia ====
- Fourth National Bank Building
- Rhodes-Haverty Building

==== Idaho ====
- Hoff Building

==== Indiana ====
- AT&T Building (Indianapolis)
- Lincoln Bank Tower

==== Illinois ====
- 333 North Michigan
- 35 East Wacker
- Carbide & Carbon Building
- Chicago Board of Trade Building
- Chicago Temple Building
- Civic Opera Building
- Faust Landmark
- Field Building
- LaSalle-Wacker Building
- Leland Tower
- London Guarantee Building
- Mather Tower
- Metropolitan Tower
- Morrison Hotel
- One North LaSalle
- Palmolive Building
- Pittsfield Building
- Powhatan Apartments
- Randolph Tower
- Tribune Tower
- Trustees System Service Building
- Wrigley Building

==== Iowa ====
- Equitable Building
- Wells Fargo Building

==== Louisiana ====
- Charity Hospital (New Orleans)
- First National Bank of Commerce Building
- Four Winds (New Orleans)
- Hibernia Bank Building
- Louisiana State Capitol
- National American Bank Building

==== Maine ====
- Time and Temperature Building

==== Maryland ====
- Bank of America Building (Baltimore)

==== Massachusetts ====
- Suffolk County Courthouse

==== Michigan ====
- AT&T Michigan Headquarters
- Boji Tower
- Book Tower
- Buhl Building
- Cadillac Place
- Cadillac Tower
- David Broderick Tower
- David Stott Building
- First National Building
- Fisher Building
- Fort Shelby Hotel
- Grand Park Centre
- Guardian Building
- Industrial Building (Detroit)
- Hudson Department Store
- Macabees Building
- Penobscot Building
- United Artists Theatre Building
- Washington Boulevard Building
- Water Board Building
- Westin Book Cadillac Hotel

==== Minnesota ====
- CenturyLink Building
- First National Bank Building
- Foshay Tower
- Minnesota Building
- Saint Paul City Hall and Ramsey County Courthouse

==== Mississippi ====
- King Edward Hotel (Jackson, Mississippi)
- Lamar Life Building
- Regions Bank Building (Jackson, Mississippi)
- Standard Life Building
- Threefoot Building

==== Missouri ====
- 909 Walnut
- 925 Grand
- Civil Courts Building
- Kansas City City Hall
- Kansas City Power and Light Building
- Oak Tower
- Southwestern Bell Building

==== Nebraska ====
- Nebraska State Capitol

==== New Jersey ====
- Bamberger's
- Camden City Hall
- Eleven 80
- Griffith Building
- Home Office Building
- Military Park Building
- National Newark Building
- New Jersey Bell Headquarters Building
- Prudential Headquarters#Gibraltar Building
- The Claridge Hotel
- Union County Courthouse (New Jersey)

==== New York ====
===== New York City =====
- 1 Wall Street
- 10 East 40th Street
- 110 East 42nd Street
- 120 Wall Street
- 15 Broad Street
- 20 Exchange Place
- 20 West Street
- 21 West Street
- 26 Broadway
- 30 Rockefeller Plaza
- 32 Avenue of the Americas
- 330 West 42nd Street
- 40 Wall Street
- 500 Fifth Avenue
- 525 Lexington Avenue
- 60 Hudson Street
- 70 Pine Street
- American Radiator Building
- Chanin Building
- Chrysler Building
- Cunard Building
- Daily News Building
- Empire State Building
- Fuller Building
- General Electric Building
- Helmsley Building
- Metropolitan Life North Building
- Nelson Tower
- New York Life Building
- One Grand Central Place
- Paramount Building
- Pershing Square Building
- Ritz Tower
- Rockefeller Center
- Savoy-Plaza Hotel
- The Beresford
- The Century
- The Eldorado
- The Majestic
- The Pierre
- The San Remo
- The Sherry-Netherland
- Verizon Building
- Waldorf Astoria
- Wall and Hanover Building
- Williamsburgh Savings Bank Tower
- Wyndham New Yorker Hotel

===== Buffalo =====
- Buffalo Central Terminal
- Buffalo City Hall
- Electric Tower
- Liberty Building
- Rand Building

===== Rochester =====
- Sibley's, Lindsay and Curr Building
- Times Square Building

===== Syracuse =====
- Niagara Mohawk Building
- State Tower Building

===== Albany =====
- Alfred E. Smith Building
- Home Savings Bank Building

===== New Rochelle =====
- 271 North Avenue

==== North Carolina ====
- 112 Tryon Plaza
- Johnston Building (Charlotte, North Carolina)

==== Ohio ====
- AT&T Huron Road Building
- Carew Tower Complex
- Fenn Tower
- FirstMerit Tower
- Guardian Bank Building
- Keith Building
- LeVeque Tower
- National City Bank Building
- Parkview Apartments (Cleveland)
- Standard Building
- Superior Building
- Terminal Tower
- The 925 Building

==== Oklahoma ====
- 320 South Boston Building
- City Place Tower (Oklahoma City)
- First National Center
- Philtower Building

==== Pennsylvania ====
- Cathedral of Learning
- Drake Hotel
- Grant Building
- Gulf Tower
- Koppers Tower
- One South Broad
- PSFS Building
- Ritz-Carlton
- Suburban Station
- Wells Fargo Building

==== Rhode Island ====
- Industrial National Bank Building
- Rhode Island Hospital Trust Building
- Turk's Head Building

==== Tennessee ====
- Andrew Johnson Building
- Crosstown Concourse
- Exchange Building (Memphis)
- Lincoln American Tower
- Madison Hotel (Memphis, Tennessee)
- Sterick Building
- Tennessee Theatre
- The Holston

==== Texas ====
- Esperson Buildings
- JPMorgan Chase Building
- Magnolia Hotel
- Tower Life Building

==== Utah ====
- Ogden/Weber Municipal Building
- Bigelow-Ben Lomond Hotel

==== Virginia ====
- Central National Bank (Richmond, Virginia)
- Hotel John Marshall

==== Washington ====
- Paulsen Medical and Dental Building
- Seattle Tower

==== Wisconsin ====
- AT&T Center (Milwaukee)
- Hilton Milwaukee City Center
- Wisconsin Gas Building
- Wisconsin Tower

=== Europe ===
==== Austria ====
===== Vienna =====
- Hochhaus Herrengasse

==== Belgium ====
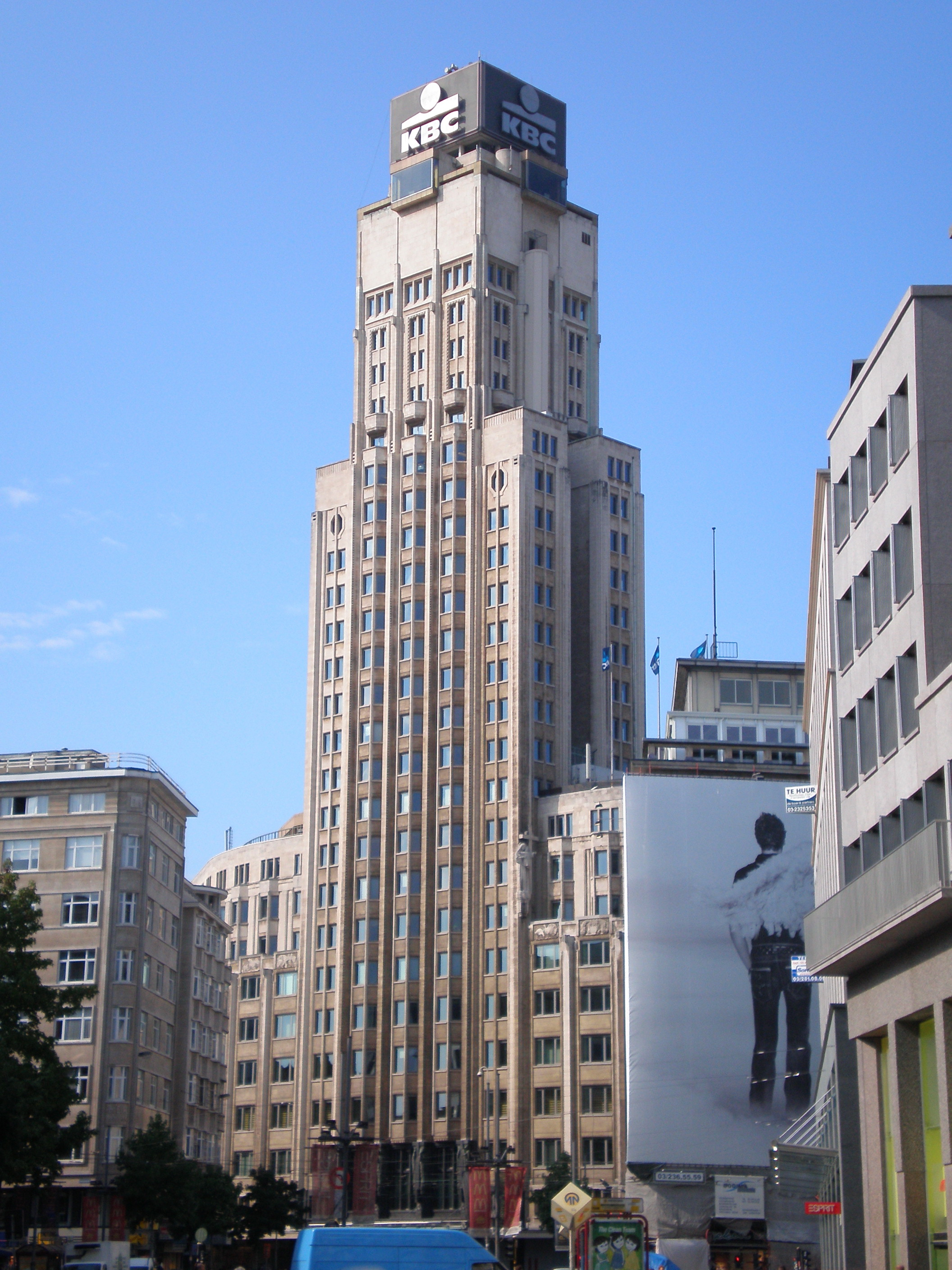
The Boerentoren in Antwerp

===== Antwerp =====
- Boerentoren
- Century Center

===== Brussels =====
- Pavillons français
- Résidence de la Cambre

===== Ghent =====
- Centrale Universiteitsbibliotheek

==== Czech Republic ====
- Baťa's Skyscraper

==== Finland ====
- Hotel Torni

==== France ====
===== Villeurbanne =====
- Gratte-ciel_(Villeurbanne)

==== Germany ====
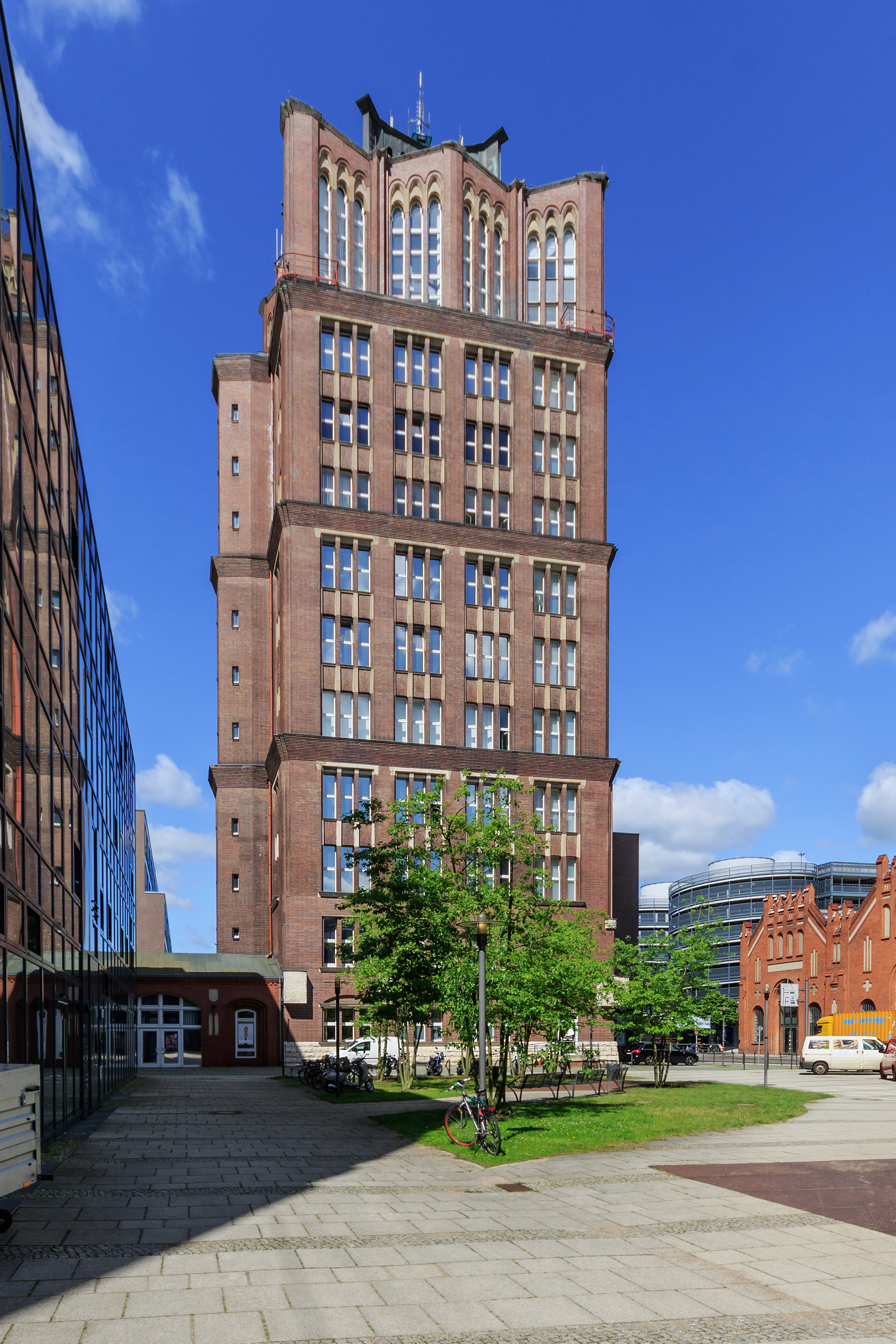
The Borsigturm in Berlin

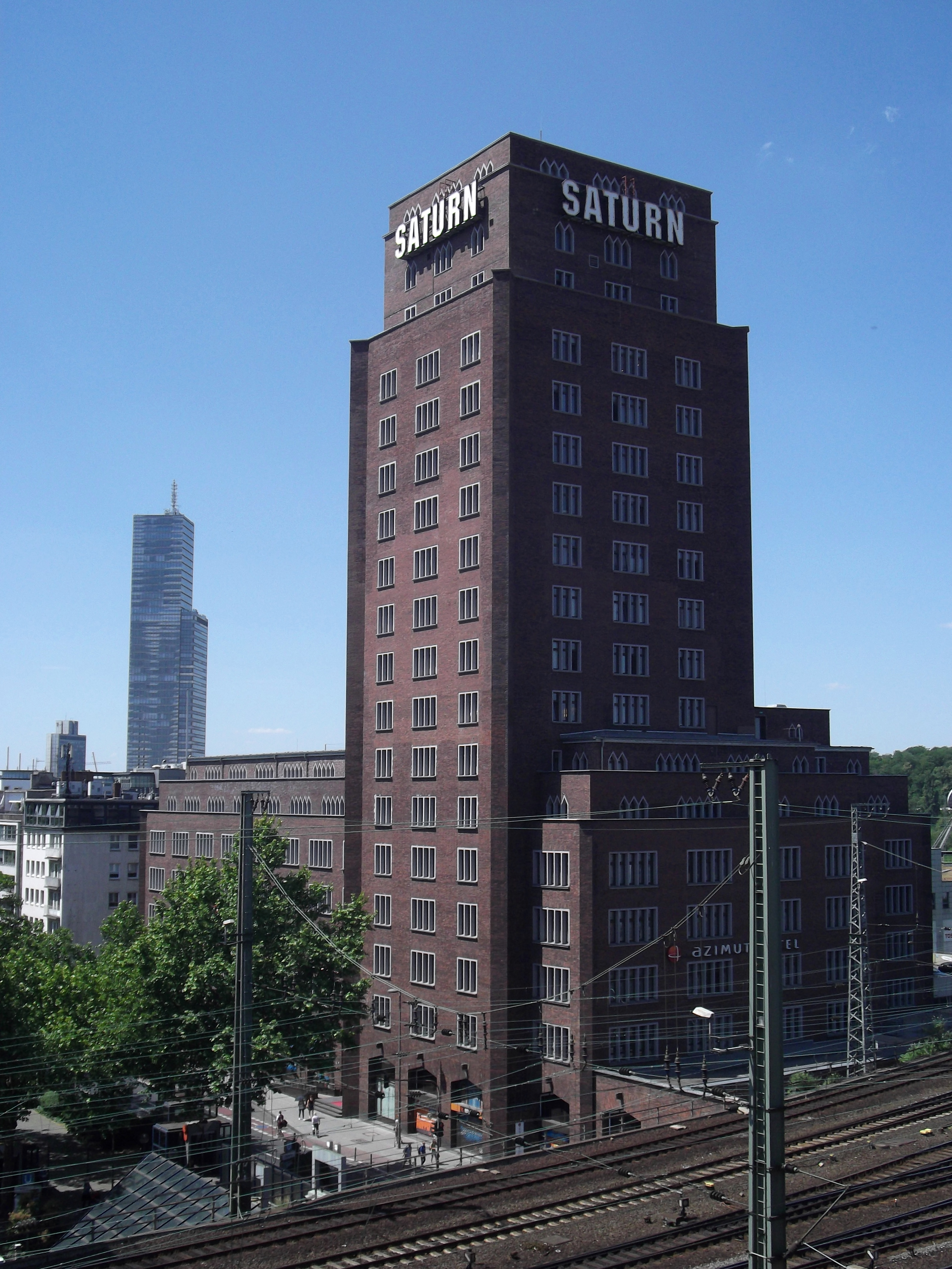
The Hansahochhaus in Cologne

===== Aachen =====
- Haus Grenzwacht

===== Berlin =====
- Borsigturm
- Columbushaus
- Europahaus
- Karstadt Berlin Hermannplatz
- Kathreiner-Haus
- Shell-Haus
- Ullsteinhaus
- Wernerwerk-Hochhaus

===== Braunschweig =====
- Haus der Wissenschaft Braunschweig

===== Chemnitz =====
- Cammann-Hochhaus

===== Cologne =====
- Hansahochhaus

===== Dresden =====
- Ernemann-Werke
- Hochhaus am Albertplatz

===== Düsseldorf =====
- Stummhaus
- Wilhelm Marx House

===== Essen =====
- Deutschlandhaus (Essen)

===== Gera =====
- Handelshof

===== Hamburg =====
- Chilehaus
- Brahms Kontor
- Meßberghof

===== Hanover =====
- Anzeiger-Hochhaus
- Capitol

===== Jena =====
- Bau 36

===== Leipzig =====
- Europahaus (Leipzig)
- Kroch High-rise

===== Magdeburg =====
- Faber-Hochhaus

===== Munich =====
- Old Technical Town Hall

===== Rüsselsheim =====
- Opelturm Rüsselsheim

===== Stuttgart =====
- Tagblatt-Turm
- Breuninger Hochhaus

==== Hungary ====
===== Budapest =====
- Az Országos Társadalombiztosító Intézet székháza

==== Italy ====
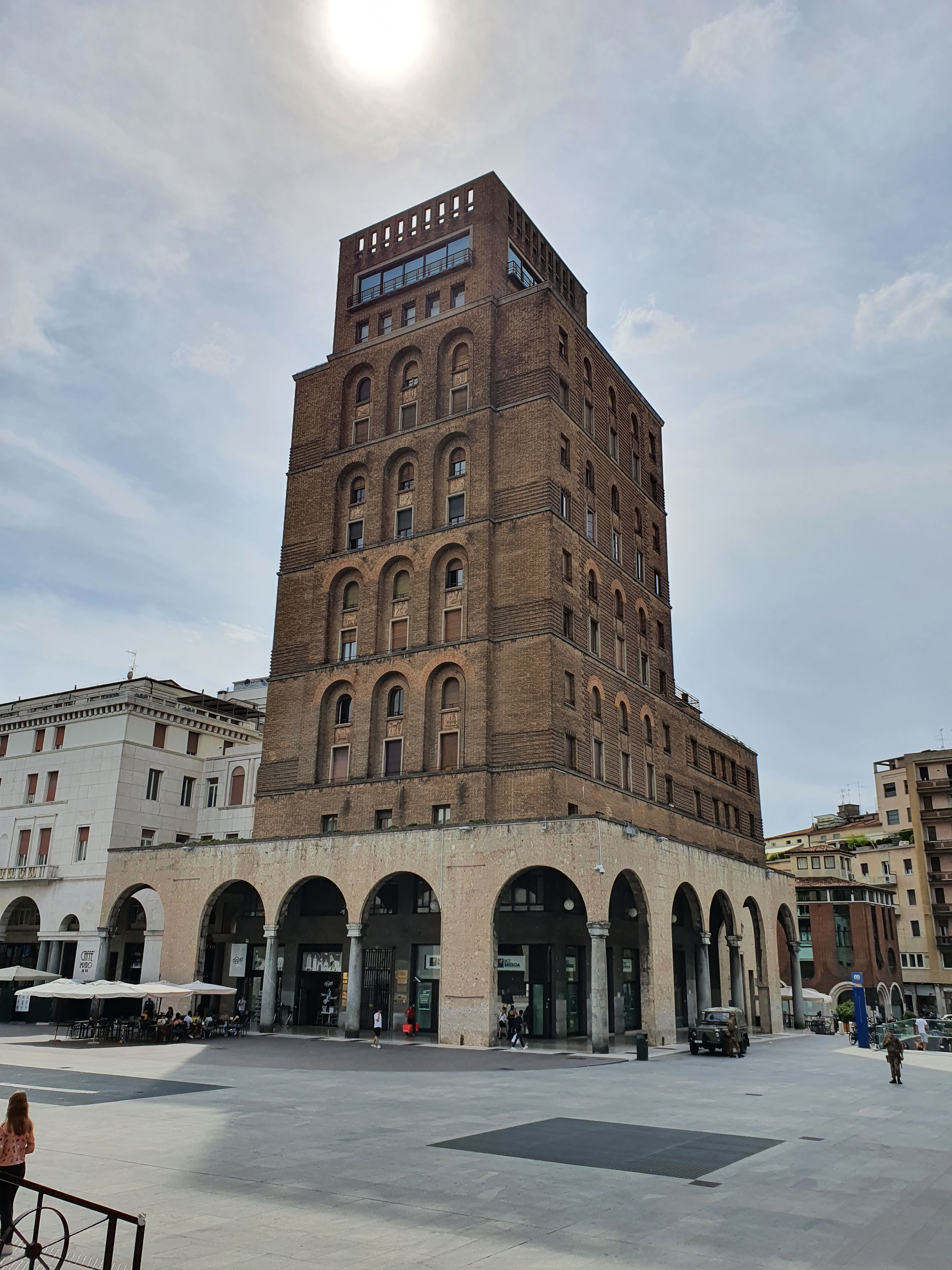
The Torrione INA in Brescia, Italy's first skyscraper.

===== Brescia =====
- Torrione INA

===== Genoa =====
- Torre Dante
- Torre Piacentini

===== Milan =====
- Palazzo e Torre Rasini
- Snia Viscosa Tower
- Torre Locatelli

===== Turin =====
- Torre Littoria

==== Netherlands ====
===== Amsterdam =====
- De Bazel
- De Wolkenkrabber

===== Rotterdam =====
- Erasmus House
- GEB Tower

===== The Hague =====
- Nirwana apartments

==== Poland ====
===== Warsaw =====
- Prudential, Warsaw

===== Wrocław =====
- Wrocław Post Office
- Biurowiec przy Rynku 9-11

===== Katowice =====
- Drapacz Chmur

==== Romania ====
===== Bucharest =====
- Telephones Company Building

==== Russia ====
- Palace of the Soviets (vision)
- House on the Embankment

==== Serbia ====
- Palace Albanija

==== Slovenia ====
- Nebotičnik

==== Spain ====
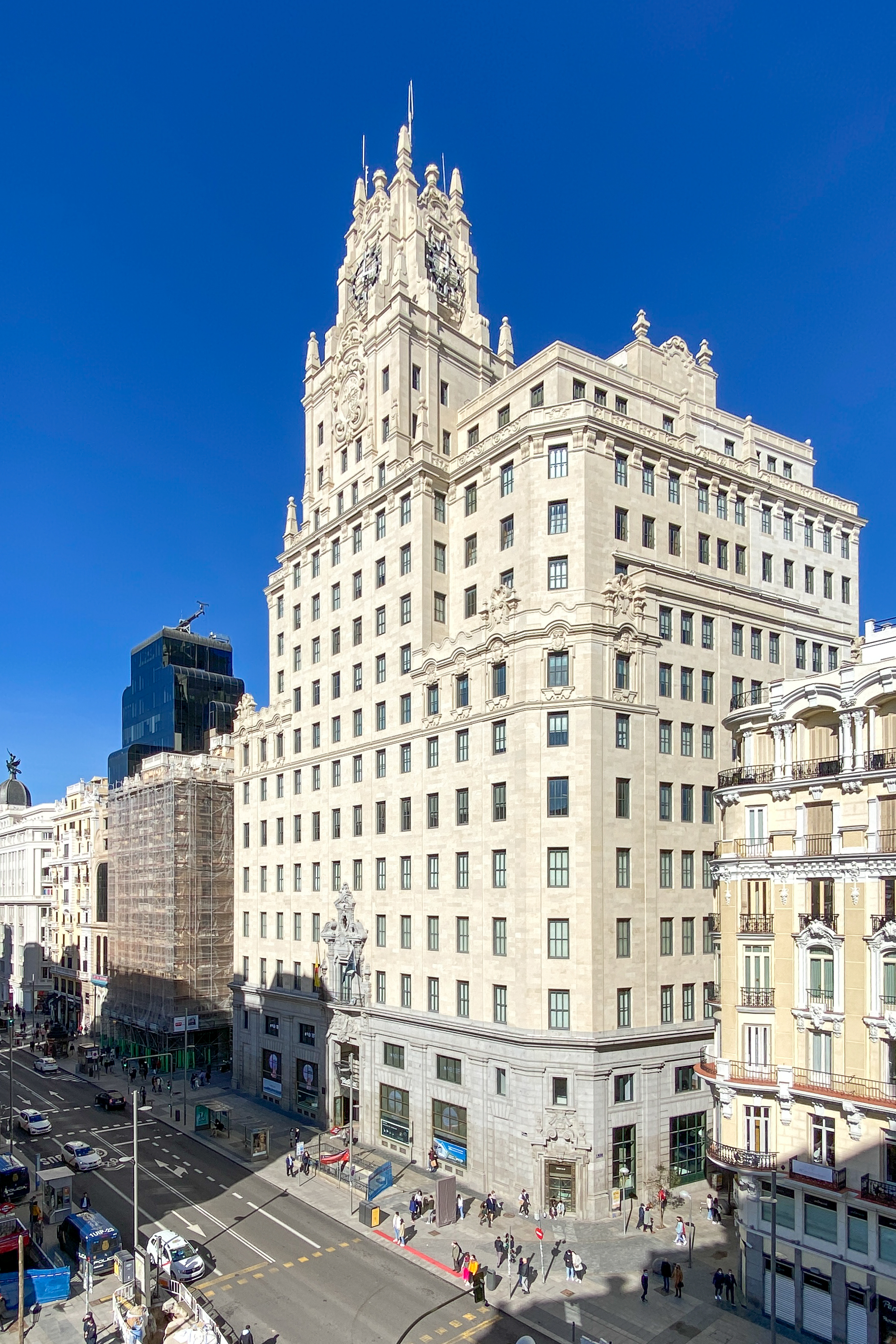
The Telefónica Building in Madrid

===== Madrid =====
- Edificio Carrión
- Edificio Vitalicio
- La Unión y el Fénix Español building
- Palacio de la Prensa
- Telefónica Building
- Edificio Metrópolis

===== Barcelona =====
- Banco Vitalicio de España

===== A Coruña =====
- Edificio del Banco Pastor en La Coruña

==== Sweden ====
===== Stockholm =====
- Kungstornen

===== Gothenburg =====
- Otterhall

==== Switzerland ====
- Bel-Air-Turm

==== Ukraine ====
===== Kyiv =====
- Government Building, Kyiv

===== Kharkiv =====
- Derzhprom
- National University of Kharkiv

==== United Kingdom ====
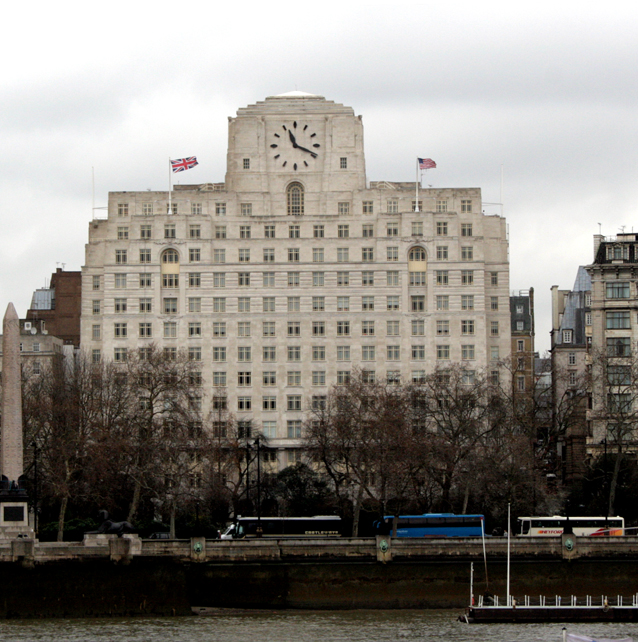
Shell Mex House, London

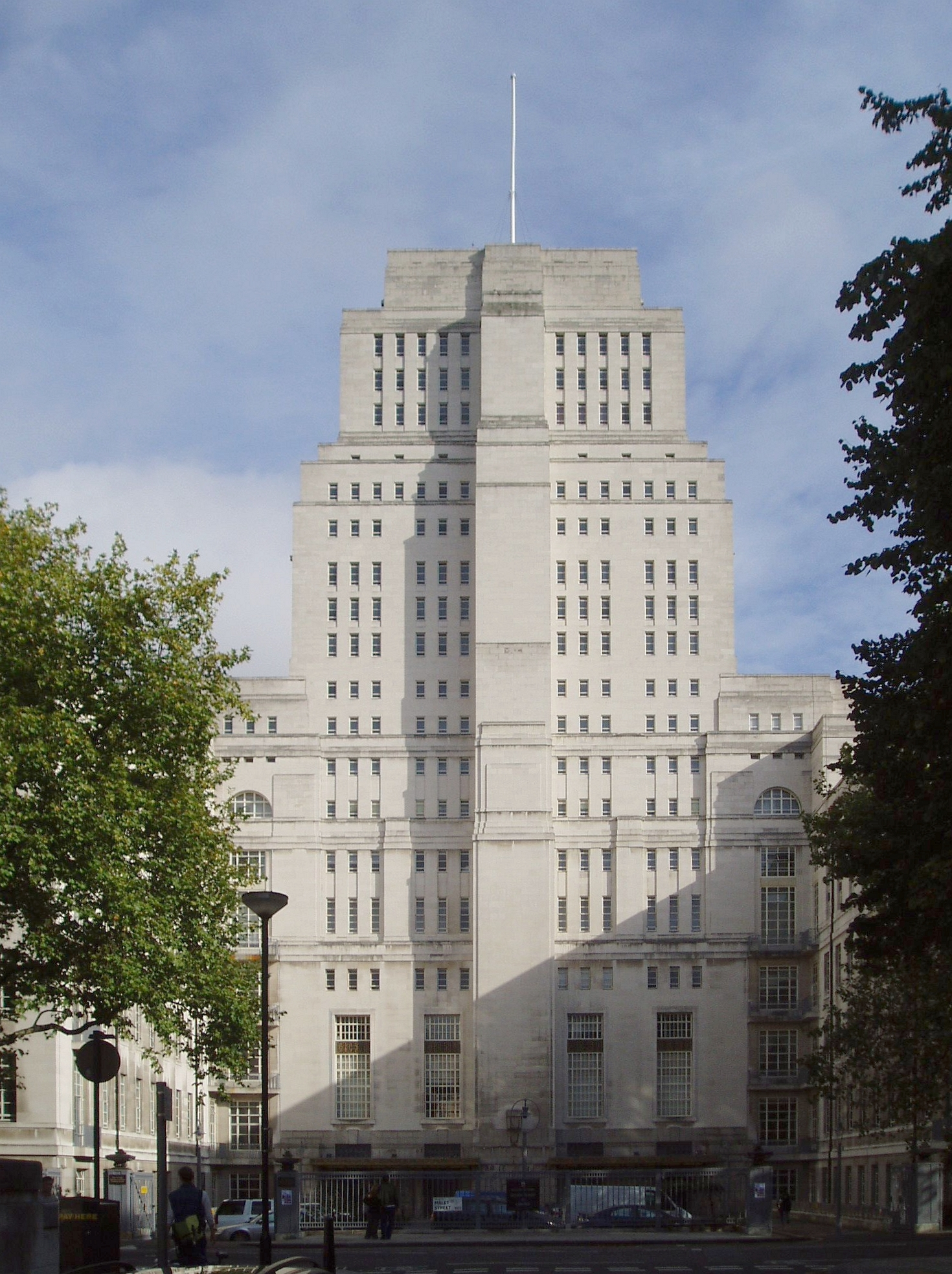
Senate House, London

===== London =====
- 55 Broadway
- Senate House, London
- Shell Mex House
- Adelaide House

===== Manchester =====
- Quay Street Tower (unbuilt)
- Sunlight House
- Lancaster House, Manchester
- Ship Canal House

===== Liverpool =====
- Martins Bank Building
- India Buildings
- Exchange Flags
- Tower Building, Liverpool

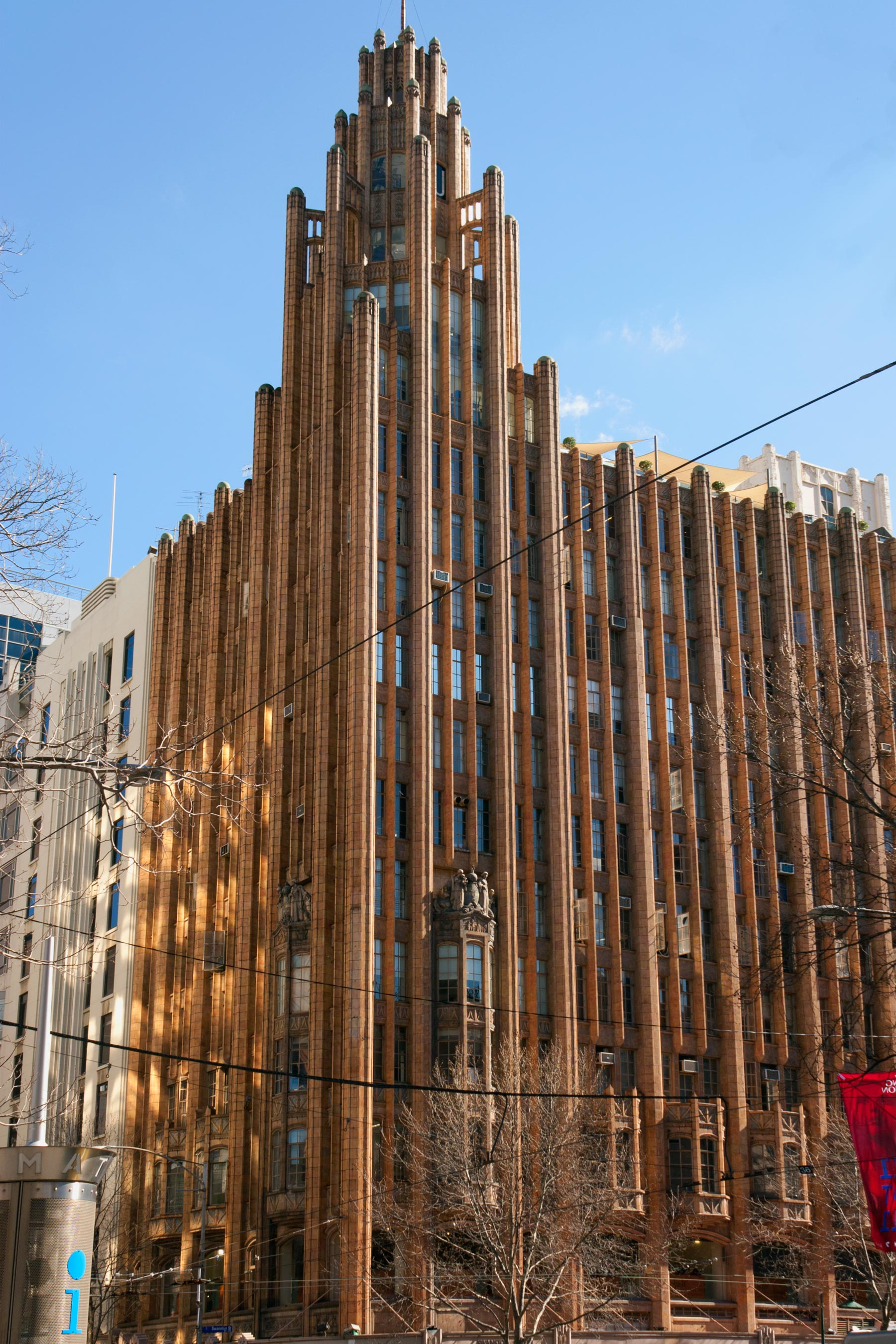
The Manchester Unity Building, Melbourne, Australia

==== Australia ====
===== Melbourne =====
- Australasian Catholic Assurance Building
- Manchester Unity Building

===== Sydney =====
- AWA Tower
- Grace Building

==== Argentina ====
- Kavanagh Building
- Palacio Barolo

==== Canada ====
===== Halifax =====
- Dominion Public Building

===== Hamilton =====
- Pigott Building

===== Montreal =====
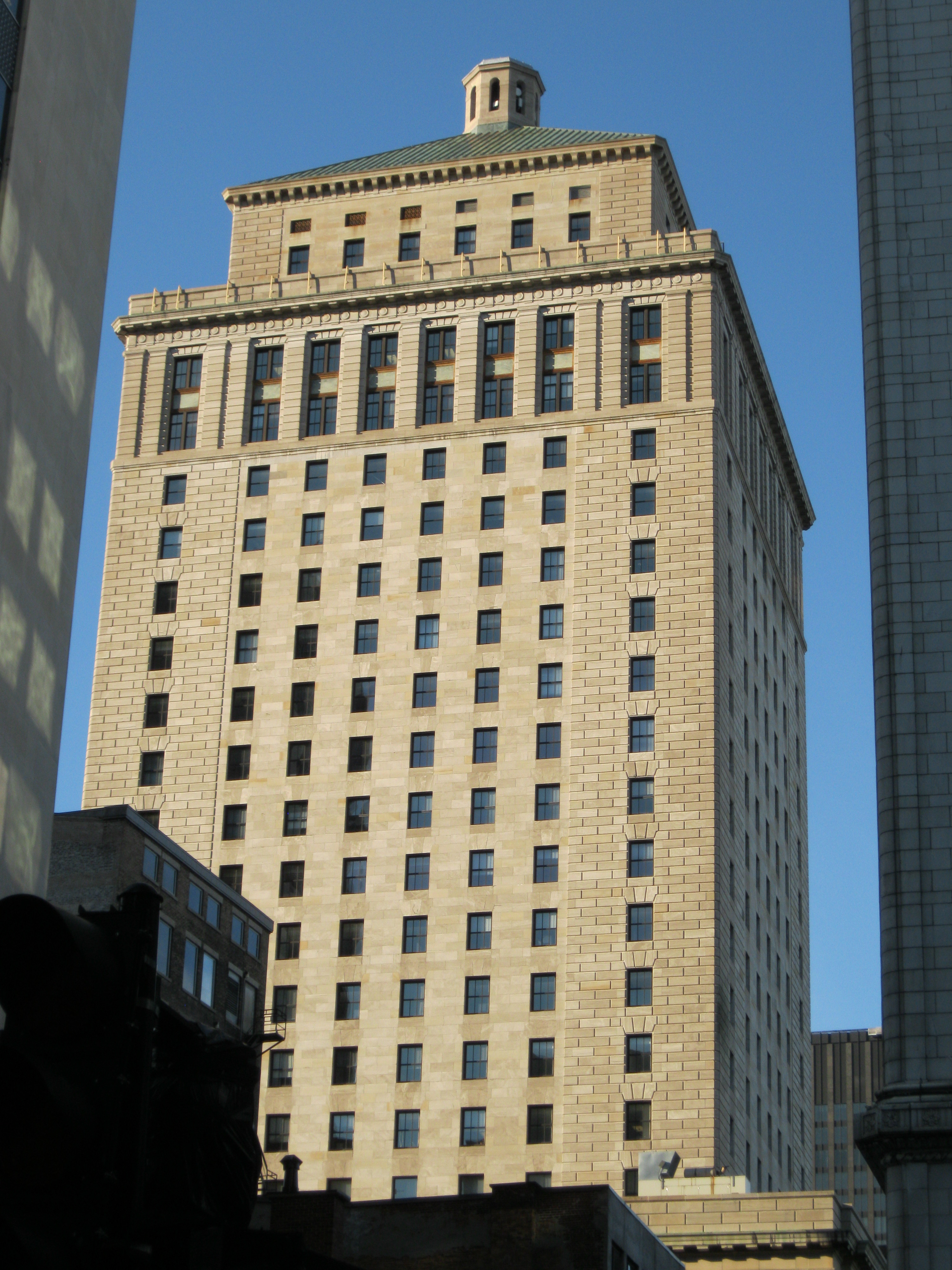
Royal Bank Tower, Montreal

- Aldred Building
- Architects' Building
- Bell Telephone Building
- Royal Bank Tower
- Sun Life Building

===== Quebec =====
- Édifice Price

===== Toronto =====
- Canada Life Building
- Canada Permanent Trust Building
- Fairmont Royal York
- Imperial Bank of Commerce Building
- Old Toronto Star Building
- Sterling Tower

===== Vancouver =====
- Hotel Vancouver
- Marine Building
- Royal Bank Tower

==== China ====
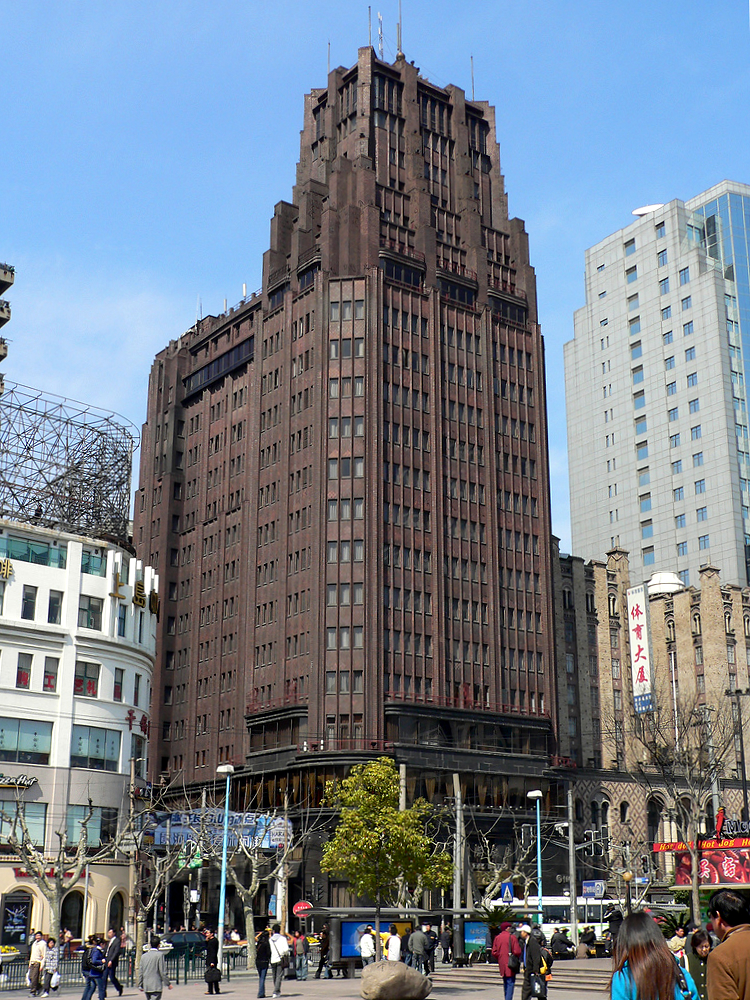
Park Hotel Shanghai, Shanghai, China

===== Guangzhou =====
- Aiqun Hotel
- Nanfang Building

===== Shanghai =====
- Bank of China Building
- Broadway Mansions
- Customs House
- Hengshan Picardie Hotel
- Jinjiang Hotel
- Park Hotel
- Peace Hotel

===== Hong Kong =====
- Hong Kong and Shanghai Banking Corporation Headquarters Building

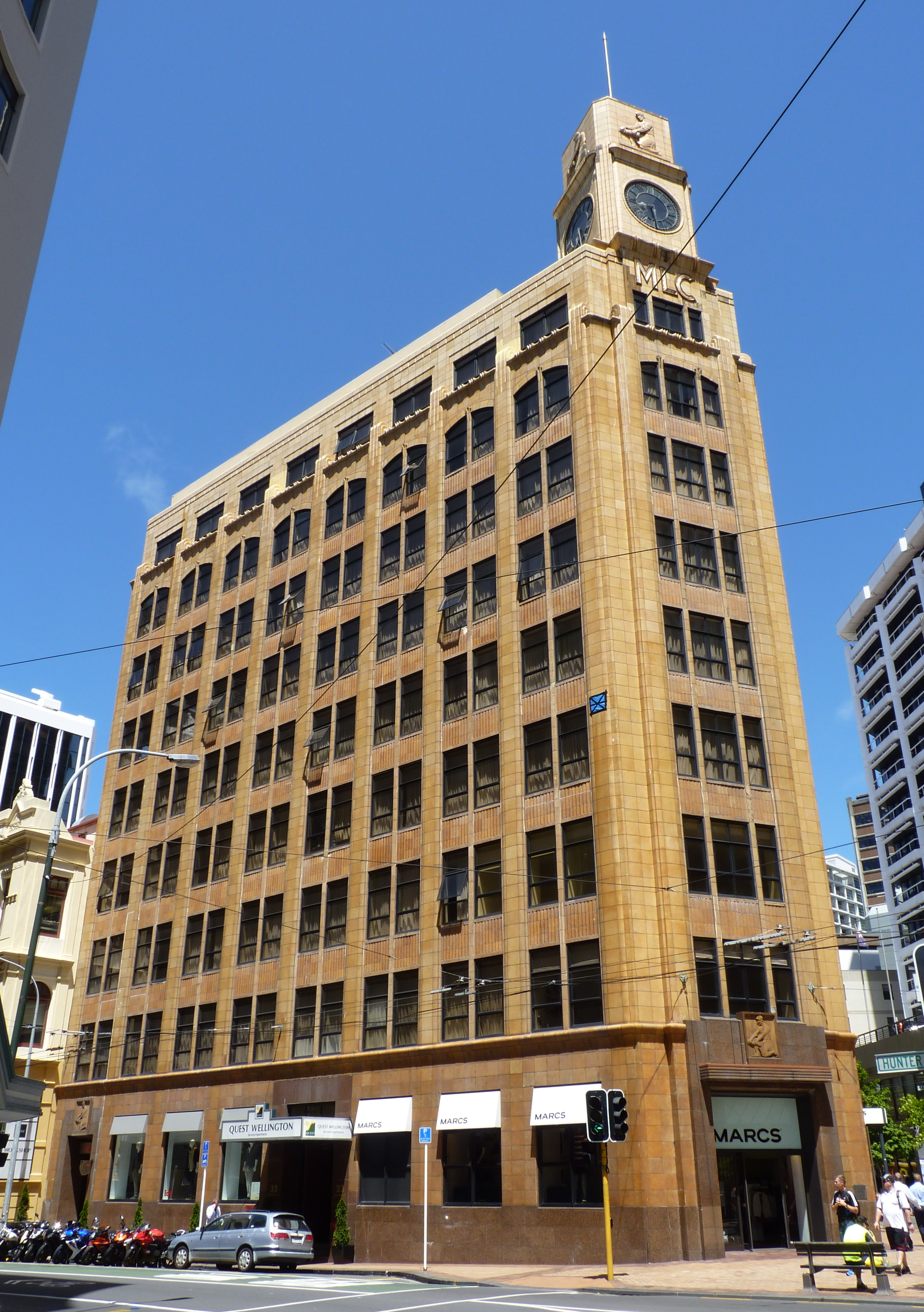
The Mutual Life & Citizens Assurance Company Building, Wellington, New Zealand

==== New Zealand ====
- Hotel St George, Wellington
- Mutual Life & Citizens Assurance Company Building, Wellington

==== South Africa ====
- Chamber of Mines Building

== See also ==
- List of skyscrapers
