= Liberty Building =

Liberty Building may refer to:

in England

- Liberty Buildings, the temporary name given to the Bluecoat Chambers, Liverpool by the then owner William Lever

in Morocco

- Liberty Building (Casablanca), in French: Immeuble Liberté, 1951 paquebot 17-story highrise residential and office building in Casablanca

in the United States

- Liberty Building (Buffalo, New York), 1925 neo-classical 23-story building in Buffalo, New York
- Liberty Building (Des Moines, Iowa), 1923 12-story highrise listed on the National Register of Historic Places (NRHP)
- Liberty Building (Medford, Oregon), listed on the NRHP in Jackson County, Oregon

in Uruguay

- Liberty Building (Montevideo), built in the 1970s, served as a working place of the President of Uruguay from the 1980s to early 2000s
