= Fiske Building =

Demolished skyscraper in Boston, Massachusetts

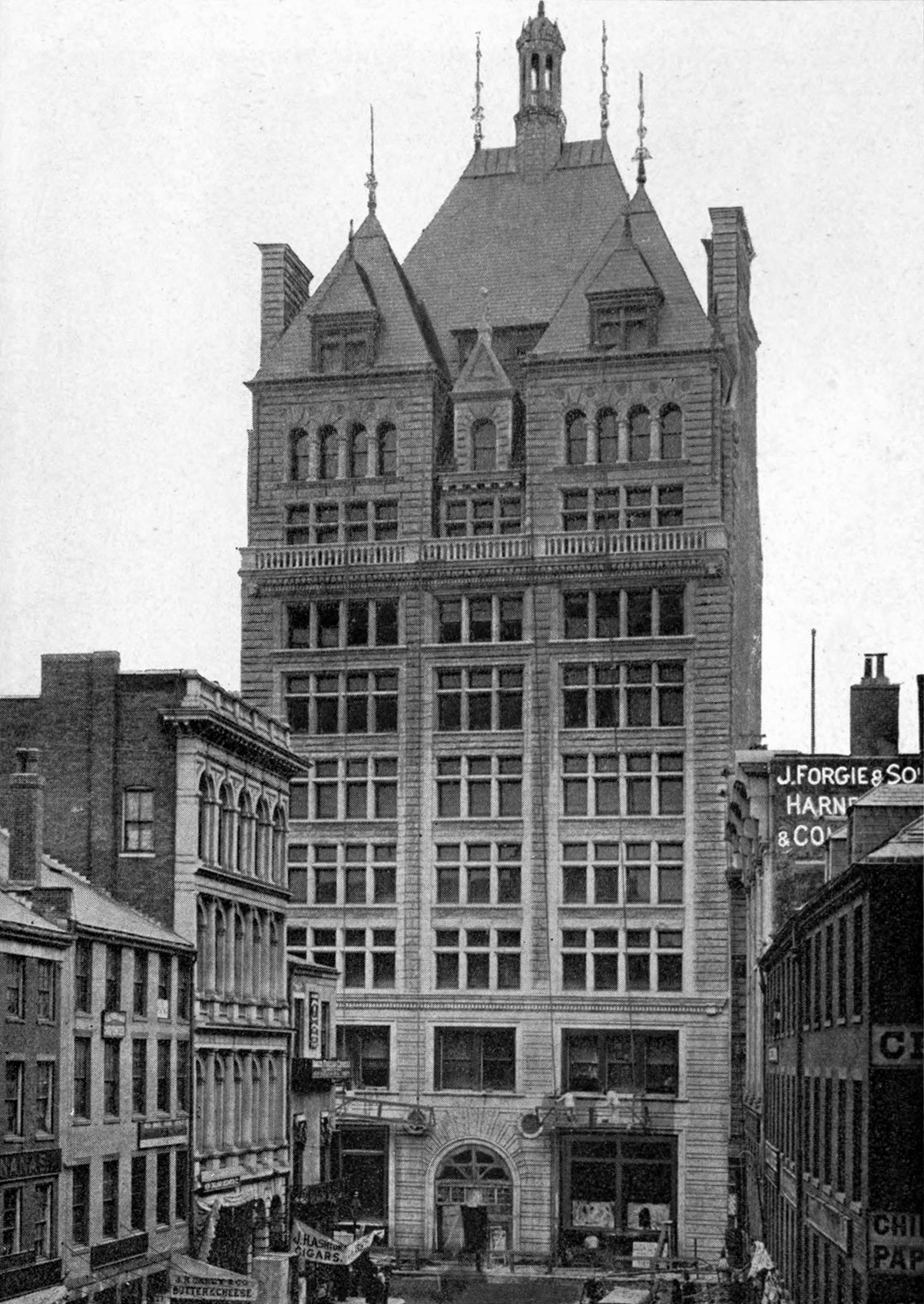
- The Fiske Building in 1892

General information
- Status: Demolished
- Location: Boston, Massachusetts, USA
- Coordinates: 42.35895°N 71.0553°W
- Construction started: 1888
- Demolished: 1986

Height
- Tip: 38.1 m (125 ft)
- Roof: 38.1 m (125 ft)

Technical details
- Floor count: 10

Design and construction
- Architect: Peabody and Stearns

The Fiske Building, located in Boston, was a 38.1 m (125 ft) skyscraper built by Peabody and Stearns in 1888 and demolished in 1986 to make way for 75 State Street. In 1964, five stories were added to the building, and the facade was altered with the addition of glass, black aluminum strips and horizontal blue panels, leading architectural observers to describe the building as one of the ugliest in Boston.

== See also ==
- List of early skyscrapers
