= Bau 36 =

High-rise in Jena, Germany

Coordinates: 50.9280312°N 11.5808057°E

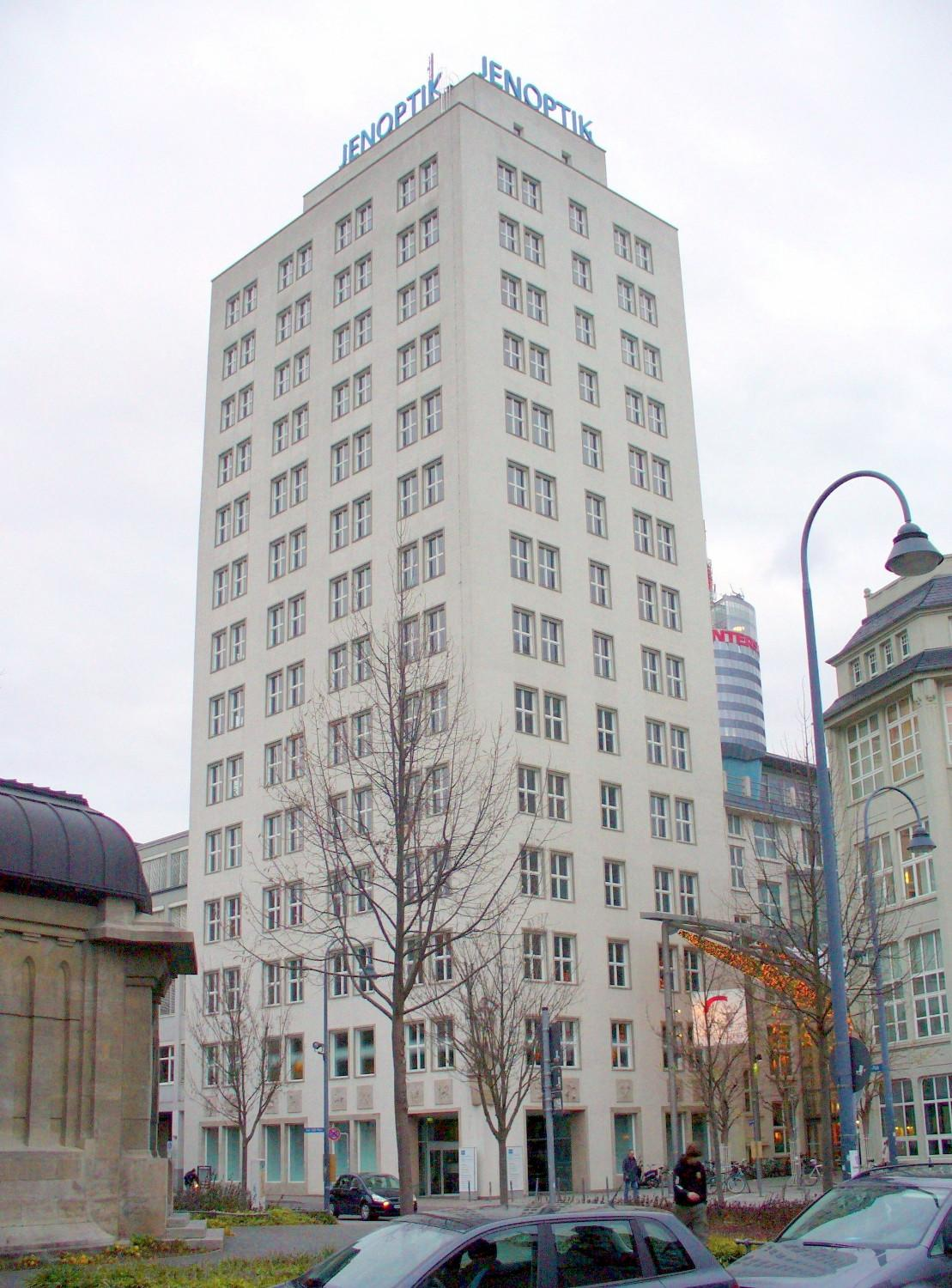
Bau 36 in 2007

Bau 36 (also known as Ernst-Abbe-High-Rise or Zeiss Building 36) is a historic high-rise located on the former factory grounds of Carl Zeiss AG in the west of the city of Jena, Germany.

Building 36 was erected between 1934 and 1935 by Georg Steinmetz and Hans Hertlein. The high-rise consists of 15 floors and reaches a height of 66 meters. It is characterized by a simple reinforced concrete skeleton structure; the only facade decoration consists of windows framed with masonry elements executed in contemporary designs. A renovation took place in 1994.

Above the main entrance, the sculpture "Through Night to Light" by Joseph Wackerle is affixed.The building now houses the main administration of Jenoptik AG. On the occasion of its 20th company anniversary in 2011, they installed a show laser in the opposite Building 15, which has since been used to project laser displays onto the building during certain events.
