= Mutual Life & Citizens Assurance Company Building =

Historic building in Wellington, New Zealand

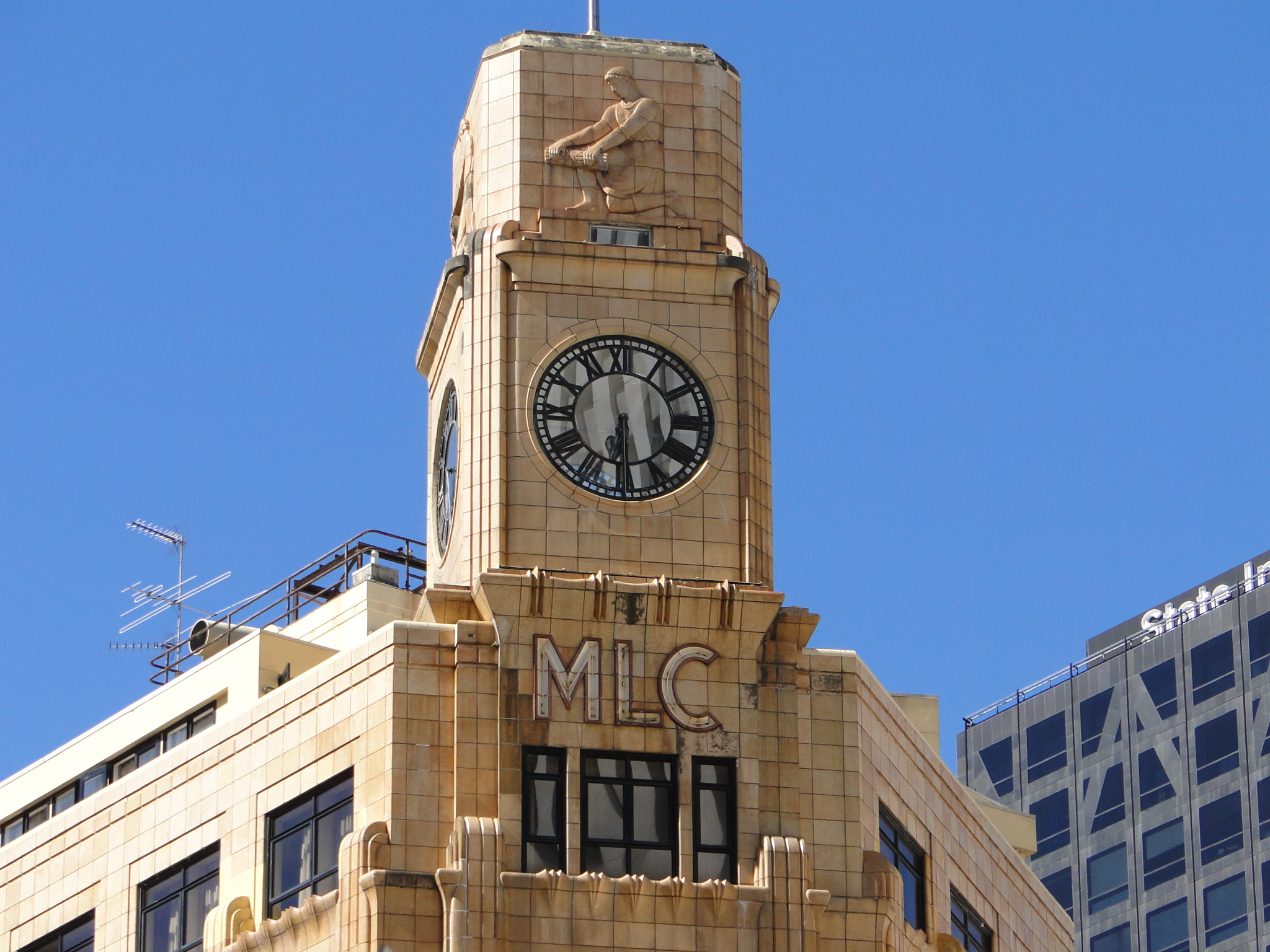
- Interactive map of the Mutual Life & Citizens Assurance Company Building area

General information
- Architectural style: Art Deco
- Location: 231 Lambton Quay, Wellington, New Zealand
- Coordinates: 41.285486°S 174.775931°E
- Completed: 1940

Technical details
- Floor count: 9

Design and construction
- Architects: Mitchell and Mitchell
- Main contractor: WM Angus

Heritage New Zealand – Category 1
- Official name: MLC Building
- Designated: 2-Jul-1987
- Reference no.: 1406

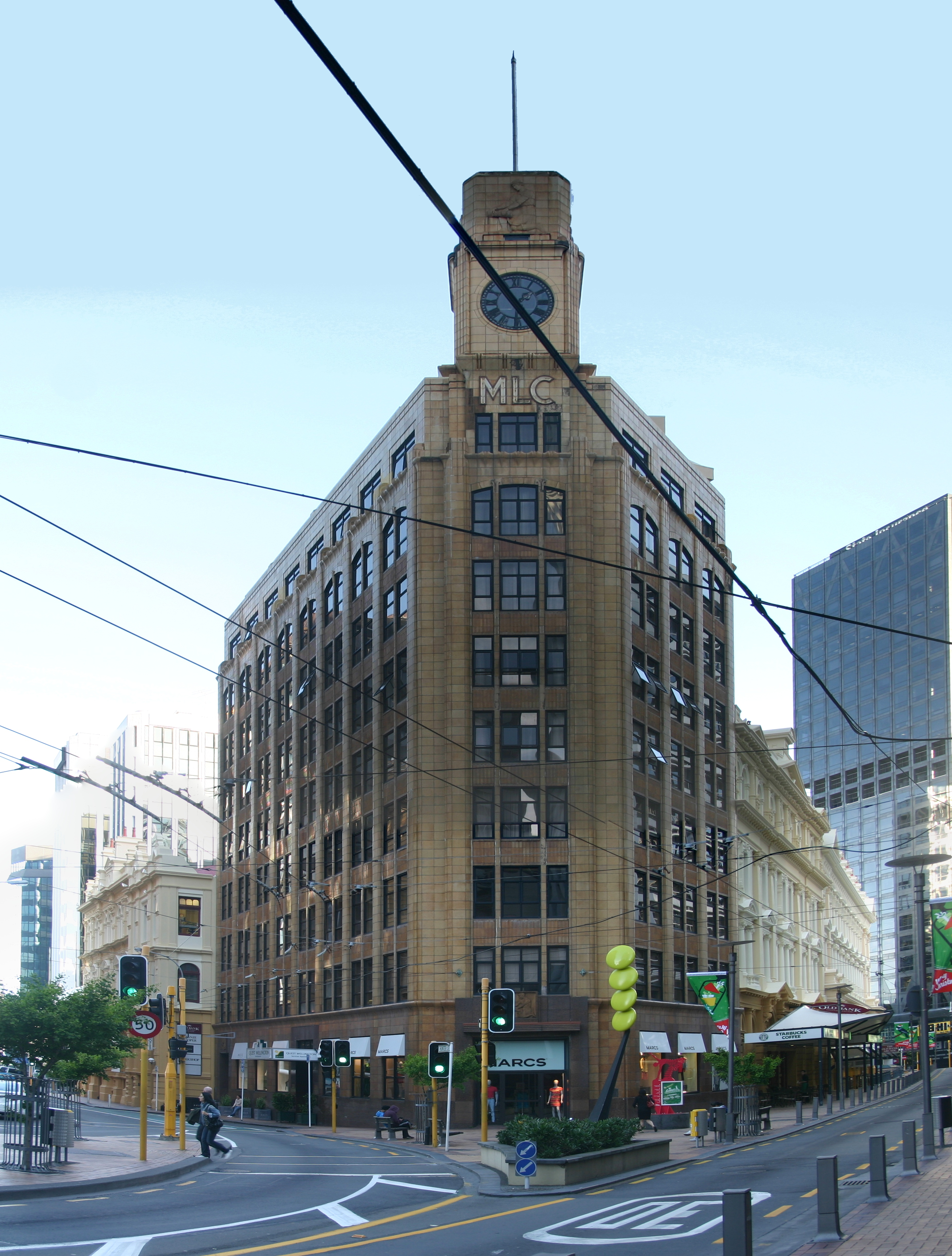
Viewed from Lambton Quay

The Mutual Life & Citizens Assurance Company Building (also known as Richard Ellis House or the MLC building) is a building located on the corner of Lambton Quay, Hunter Street and Featherston Street in Wellington, New Zealand.

The MLC building was completed in 1940 at a cost of £101,494 by W.M. Angus Ltd. for the, Australian-based insurance company, MLC. MLC operated its head office out of this building until 1985, when the New Zealand branch of the firm was taken over by New Zealand Insurance.

The clock on the building was installed in 1953 (three months too late for celebrations for the Coronation of Queen Elizabeth II).

The building is classified as a Category 1 Historic Place (places of "special or outstanding historical or cultural heritage significance or value") by Heritage New Zealand.

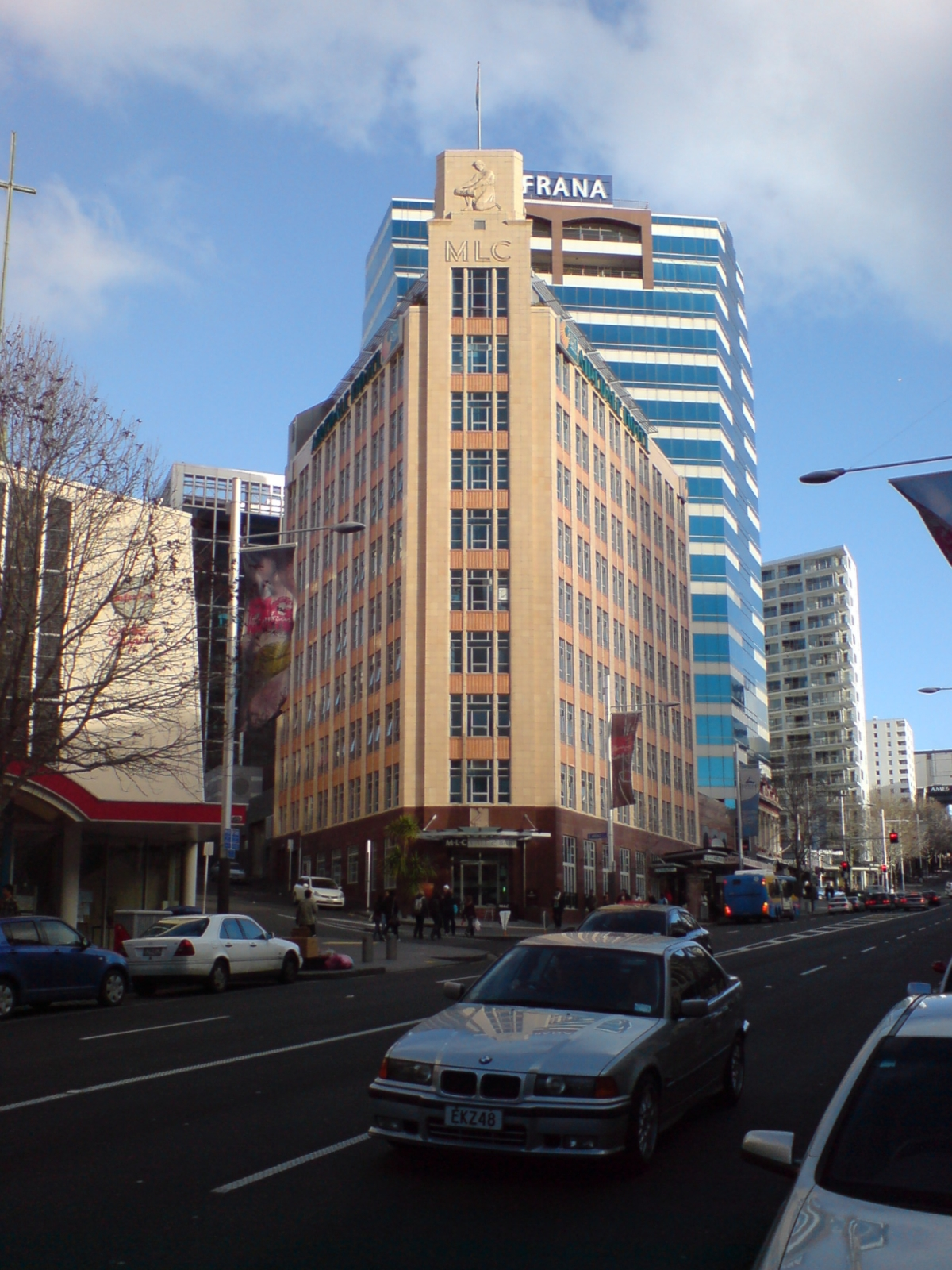
Very similar category 2 listed 1950s MLC building in Auckland
