= Hengshan Picardie Hotel =

Hotel in Shanghai, China

Coordinates: 31.20241°N 121.43875°E

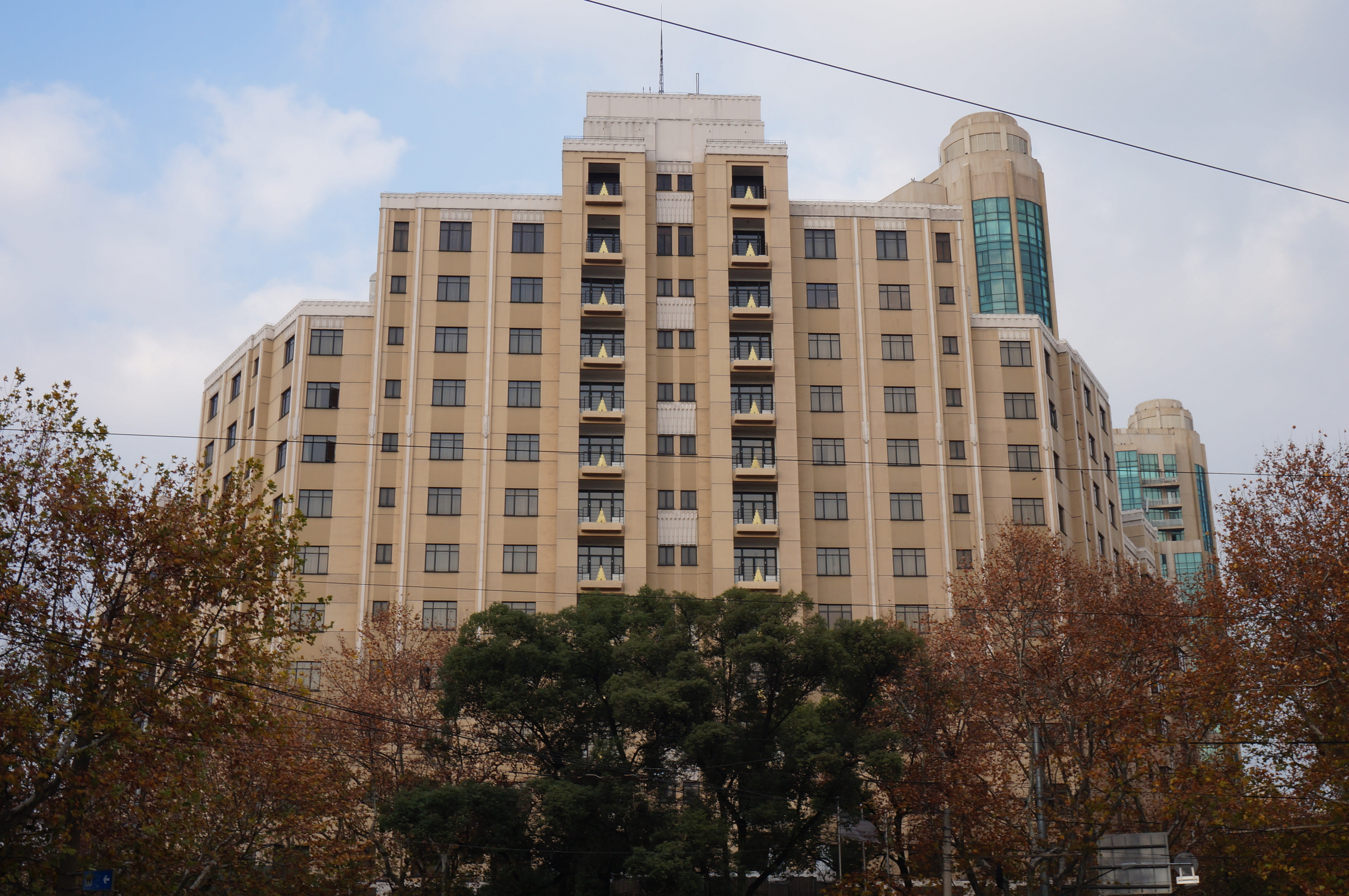
Hengshan Picardi Hotel

Hengshan Picardie Hotel (Chinese: 衡山宾馆) is an Art Deco five-star hotel in Shanghai, China. It was constructed by René Eugène Fano, in 1934 as Picardie Apartments, after French Chinese post co-director Henri Picard-Destelan.

The Hengshan was frequented by Jiang Qing during the Cultural Revolution.

== See also ==
- Hengshan Road
- Park Hotel Shanghai
- Broadway Mansions
