= Liberty Building (Casablanca) =

Moroccan skyscraper

- عمارة الحرية; Immeuble Liberté
- Interactive map of the Liberty Building area

General information
- Architectural style: paquebot (Streamline Moderne)
- Location: Casablanca, Morocco
- Construction started: 1949
- Completed: 1951

Design and construction
- Architect: Léonard Morandi

The Liberty Building (Arabic: عمارة الحرية, French: Immeuble Liberté), also known as "17 Stories" (17 étages or dix-sept étages), is a 17-story residential tower in Casablanca, Morocco. It was designed by Léonard Morandi and built between 1949 and 1951. At the time of its construction, it was one of the tallest buildings on the African continent.

== History ==
Léonard Morandi departed on a prospective trip to Morocco at the end of 1946. Morandi ultimately settled in Casablanca in 1947. He received his work permit October 1948, and soon three entrepreneurs from Lyon, Grenoble, and Marseille asked him to build a mixed-use residential and office tower.

Jacques Lemaigre Dubreuil (1894-1955), a French businessman and an activist in favor of Moroccan independence, was among the residents of the Liberty Building. He was assassinated at the foot of the building—ostensibly by La Main Rouge; the square, previously "Place de la Révolution Française," was renamed in his honor.

== Architecture ==
This building has 17 stories and reaches a height of 78 meters. It was among the first skyscrapers to be built on the African continent, and it was the first building with more than 16 stories in Morocco.

In addition to its groundbreaking history and its symbolism as the first residential building of its height on the continent, it was innovatively designed. The building's floor plan takes the form of a V, which increases natural sunlight, and its southward orientation ensures direct sunlight and reduces the need for heating. The main rooms, all facing south toward the square, are sheltered from ocean breeze often laden with humidity. The building also has private garbage chutes with antiseptic lining that lead to an incinerator.

Skyward view of Liberty building

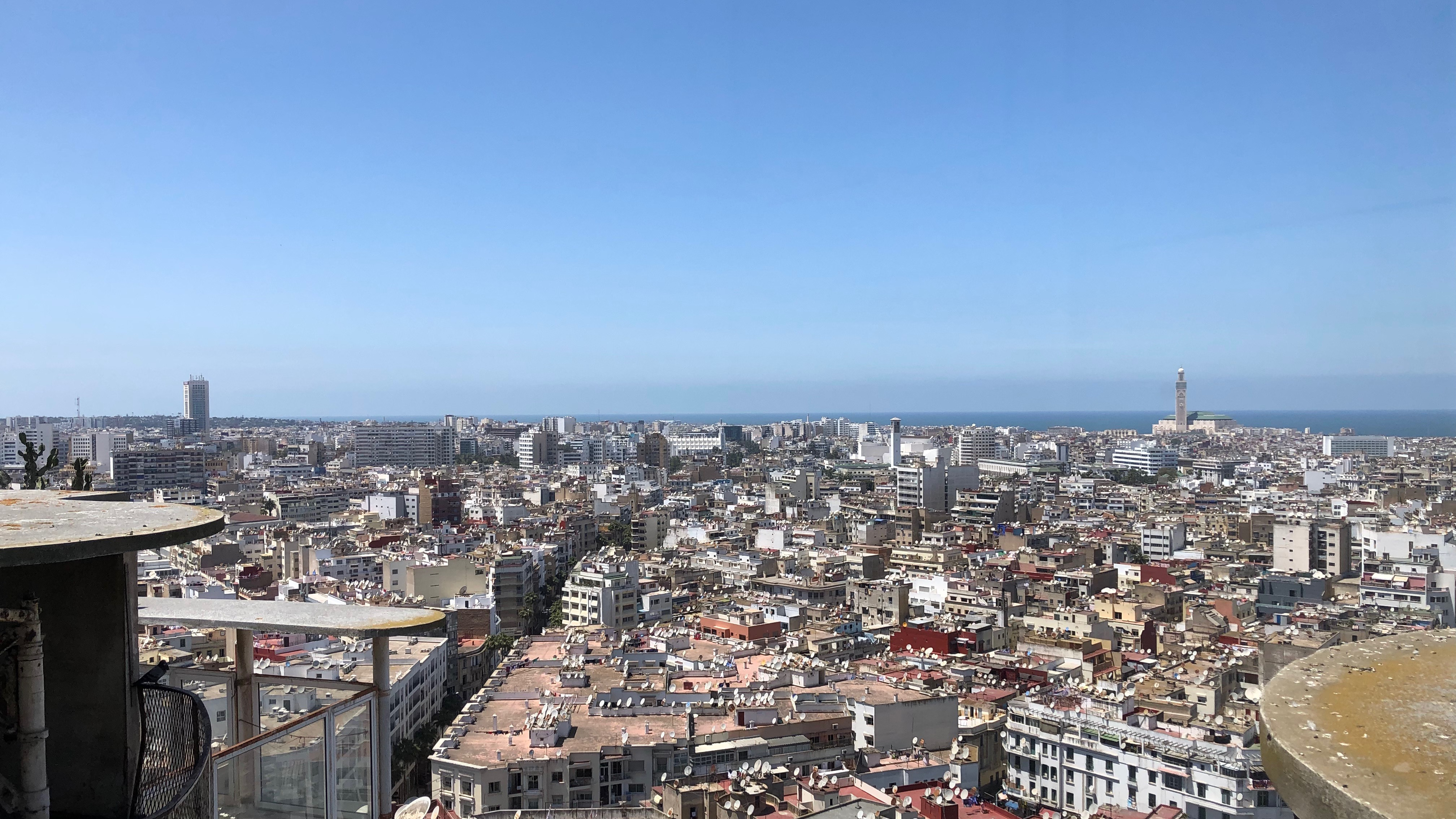
Westward view of Casablanca from the top floor of the Liberty Building
