= Observatory Building =

General information
- Type: Offices
- Location: 400 Locust Street, Des Moines, Iowa, United States
- Coordinates: 41.5867°N 93.6227°W
- Construction started: 1895
- Completed: 1896
- Opening: April 1, 1896
- Demolished: 1937
- Owner: Gerrit Van Ginkel

Height
- Roof: 197 ft (60 m)

Technical details
- Floor count: 13 (including 4 story tower)

Design and construction
- Architect: Charles Edward Eastman

Other information
- Public transit: DART

The Observatory Building circa 1900s.

The Observatory Building, also known as the Van Ginkel Building, was a skyscraper located in downtown Des Moines, Iowa. Standing at 197 ft tall (60 m) and heralded as "the tallest office building between Chicago and San Francisco" when opened on April 1, 1896, it was also the first skyscraper in Iowa. Although it was the tallest office building, the Observatory Building was not the tallest building in Des Moines, the Iowa State Capitol, completed in 1884, was 275 ft tall (84 m).

With a look considered modern for its time, the building consisted of nine stories of office space, a rooftop garden including a 600-seat venue for outdoor performances, and a four-story observation tower, the distinctive feature which also gave the building its name. Electricity and gas lighting was provided to all tenants. Access to the tower was provided to paying customers for what was at the time an almost unique view of the city. The installation of a beacon that would shine over the city nightly added further to the buildings uniqueness.

From its incorporation in 1896 until 1905 the head office of the Central Life Assurance Society of the United States was located in the Observatory Building. This company is still based in Des Moines today and now known as The Aviva Life and Annuity Company

The building was eventually demolished during the latter half of 1937, and this location is now occupied by Capital Square Mall.

== See also ==
- Des Moines, Iowa
- List of tallest buildings in Iowa
