= Fyodor Alyoshin's profitable house =

Hotel in Ukraine

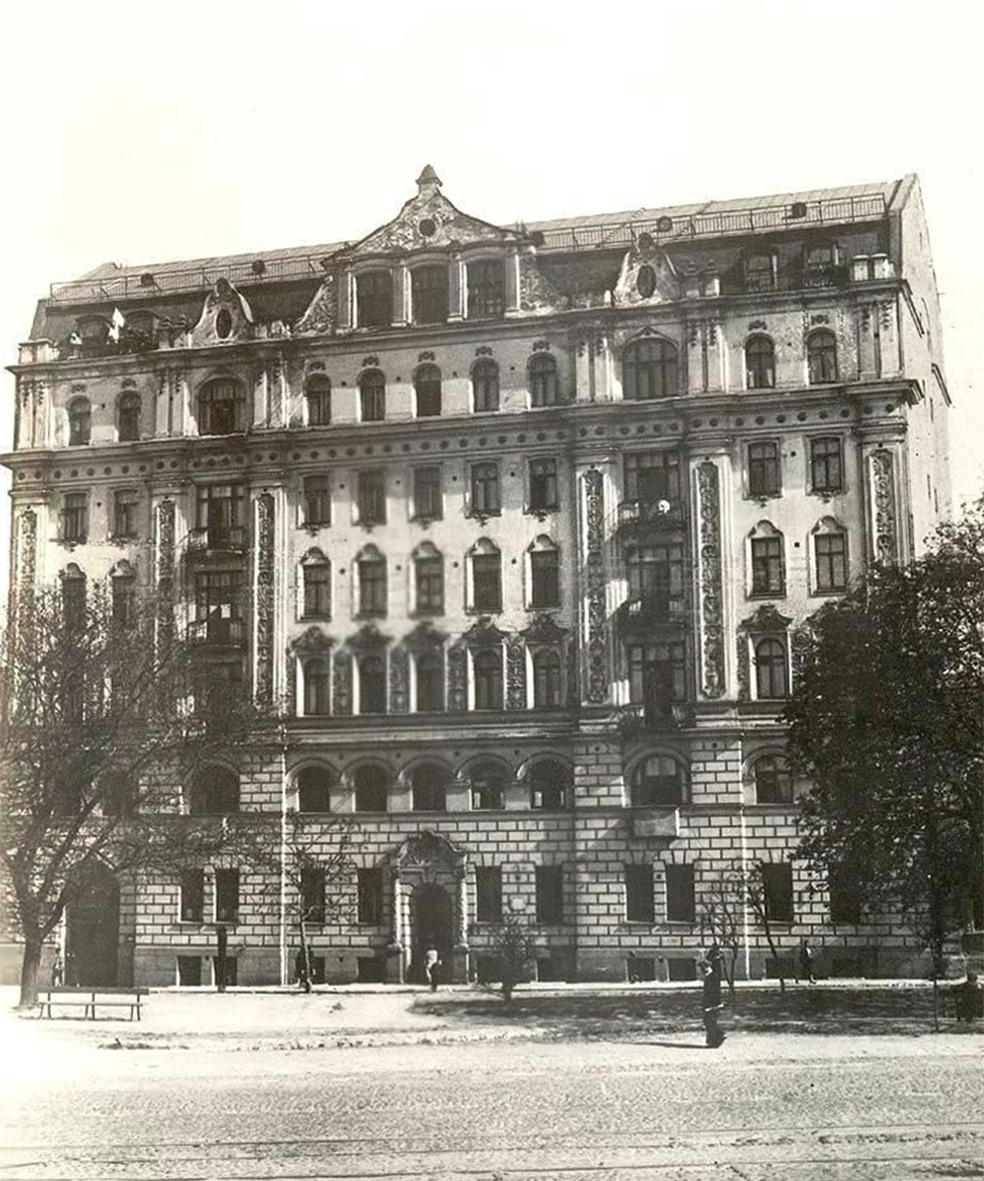

General information
- Status: Destroyed
- Architectural style: Neo-Baroque
- Location: Kyiv, Ukraine
- Construction started: 1912
- Completed: 1914
- Demolished: 1943
- Owner: Fyodor Alyoshin

Height
- Height: 35–40 m (115–131 ft) roof

Technical details
- Floor count: 7

Design and construction
- Architect: Paul Aloshin

Fyodor Alyoshin's profitable house was a 40-meter skyscraper in Kyiv. The building was one of the most modern tenement houses in Kyiv at the time, built just before the outbreak of the First World War and destroyed during the midst of the Second World War.

== Description of the building ==
This hotel was built by architect Paul Aloshin for his wealthy father. The building had 54 apartments and one garage. The most expensive of them were located in the central building and contained 7-8 rooms each. On the top floor there was an art studio and 13 living rooms with special niches for sleeping. Each apartment had a wood shed, an icehouse with a refrigerator, a laundry room, a cellar and a piece of the attic. In addition to two passenger lifts Otis companies, there was a special lift for firewood and laundry on the emergency stairs. The house burned down in the Second World War, but drawings of the building have been preserved in the archives.
