= Georg Steinmetz =

German Architect

Georg Steinmetz (September 28, 1882, Kassel – April 4, 1936, Berlin) was a German architect.

== Life and work ==
After studying architecture at the Berlin Art Academy, where he was a master student of Franz Schwechten, and at the Technical University of Charlottenburg, he initially worked for five years as an architect in the Prussian Ministry of Public Works in Berlin. In 1908, Steinmetz became an employee in Helmuth Grisebach's architectural office in Berlin. Since 1912 at the latest, he was co-owner of the joint office Grisebach and Steinmetz.

After 1918, he worked as a self-employed architect in Berlin, where he had an architectural office in Charlottenburg. From 1925 to 1936, he was a member of the Prussian Academy of Arts and the Prussian Academy of Civil Engineering. In 1925, the Stuttgart Technical University awarded him an honorary doctorate (Dr.-Ing. E. h.). He was also the inventor of the plan-spiral drawing registry (with 38 patents). In his writings, he represented the idea of solid craftsmanship as a basis for architecture. In 1928, Steinmetz was with Heinrich Tessenow, Paul Bonatz, German Bestelmeyer, and others as judges of the limited competition Neue Universität (Heidelberg). In 1924, Rudolf Schwarz was his colleague for a few weeks.

Since 1908, he was married to Martha née Schydlow (d. 1934). His final resting place is in the southwest churchyard of Stahnsdorf, Brandenburg.

== Literature ==
- Willy Oskar Dreßler (ed.): Dressler's art handbook . 9th edition, Volume II, Berlin 1930.
- . In: Hans Vollmer (ed.): Founded by Ulrich Thieme and Felix Becker . tape 31 : Siemering–Stephens . EA Seemann, Leipzig 1937, p. 576 .
- Julius Posener : Berlin on the way to a new architecture. The era of Kaiser Wilhelm II (1889–1917). Munich 1979, p. 632.
- Michael Lissok: The “half” Semper Castle. About one of the youngest mansions on Rügen and its architect Georg Steinmetz. In: Rügen impressions. 11th episode, 2001, pp. 339–343.
