= Chamber of Mines Building =

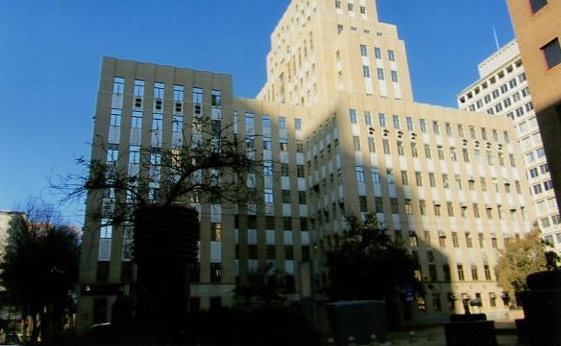
- The Chamber of Mines Building, Hollard Str Johannesburg

General information
- Status: Completed
- Type: Business-use
- Location: 47 Hilliard St, Johannesburg, South Africa
- Coordinates: 26.207570654377403°S 28.038672859291452°E
- Completed: 1954

Height
- Roof: 31 metres (102 ft)

Technical details
- Floor count: 17

Design and construction
- Architect(s): Kef Gardiner & McFadyan

The Chamber of Mines building in Johannesburg was constructed by the company of Emely and Scott in 1921. It was then renovated by the partnership of Kef Gardiner & McFadyan. The building is owned by the South African Chamber of Mines which does not participate in mining directly but undertakes many functions and activities including research on behalf of the industry as a whole.

== Design ==
On the exterior the building has aluminum art carvings designed by Major J. Gardener relating to different aspects of mining activities. The entrance hall has two murals designed by Phyllis Gardener depicting mining activities.
