= Hansahochhaus =

Skyscraper in Cologne, Germany

Coordinates: 50.9489°N 6.9514°E

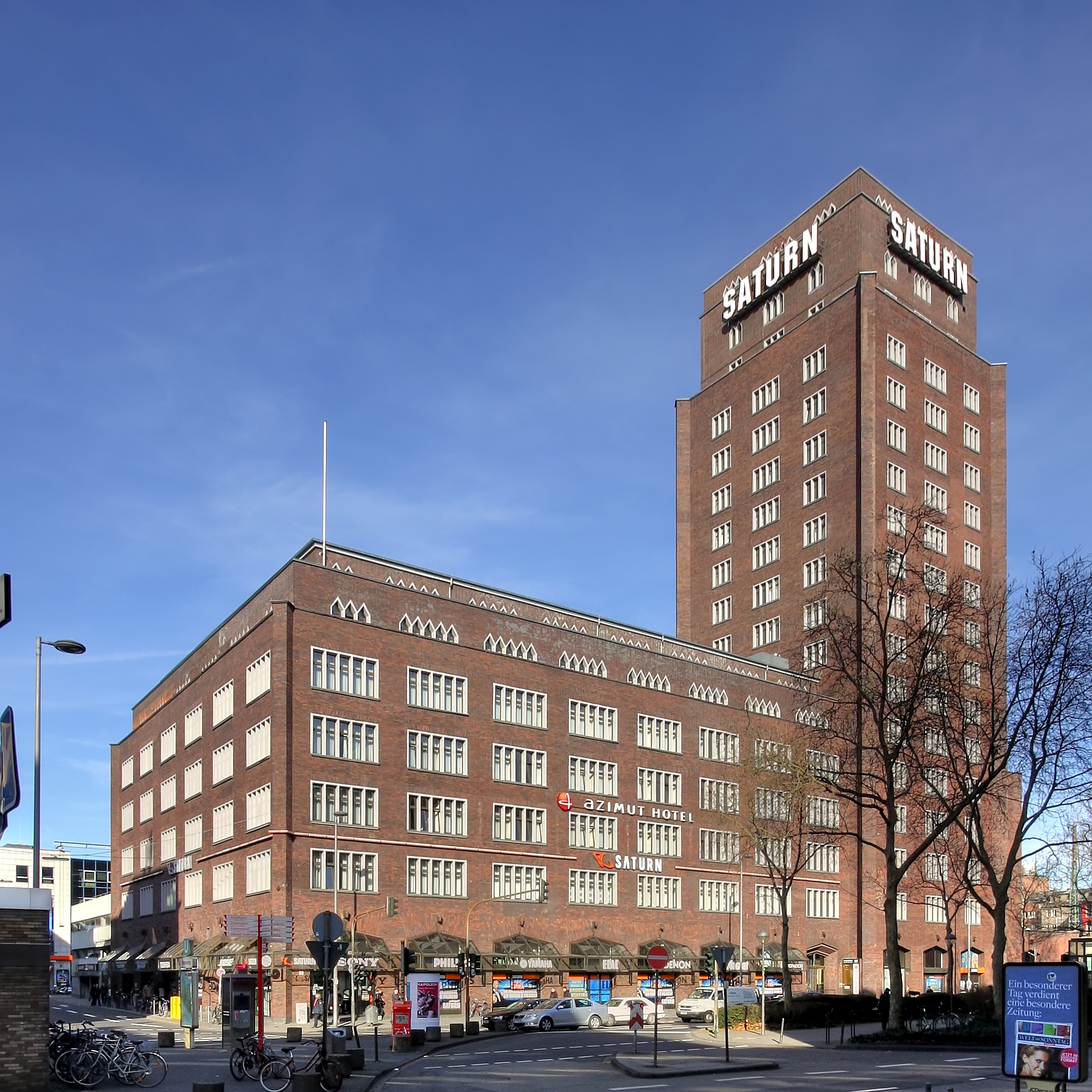
The Hansahochhaus

The Hansahochhaus is a skyscraper in the Neustadt-Nord quarter of north-central Cologne. When constructed in 1924-25 it was the city's first skyscraper, and one of the first skyscrapers in Germany. It was designed as an office building in the Expressionist style by the local architect, Jacob Koerfer. It was constructed in just 135 working days, which was considered less than the time taken to erect comparable buildings in the United States where skyscrapers were already becoming mainstream by the 1920s, but construction of the Hansahochhaus was subject to interruptions so the total construction period stretched over 15 months. With 17 floors and a total height of 65 meters, for a brief period following its construction the Hansahochhaus was Europe's tallest building.

It is currently protected under historic monument legislation.
