= The Stark Building =

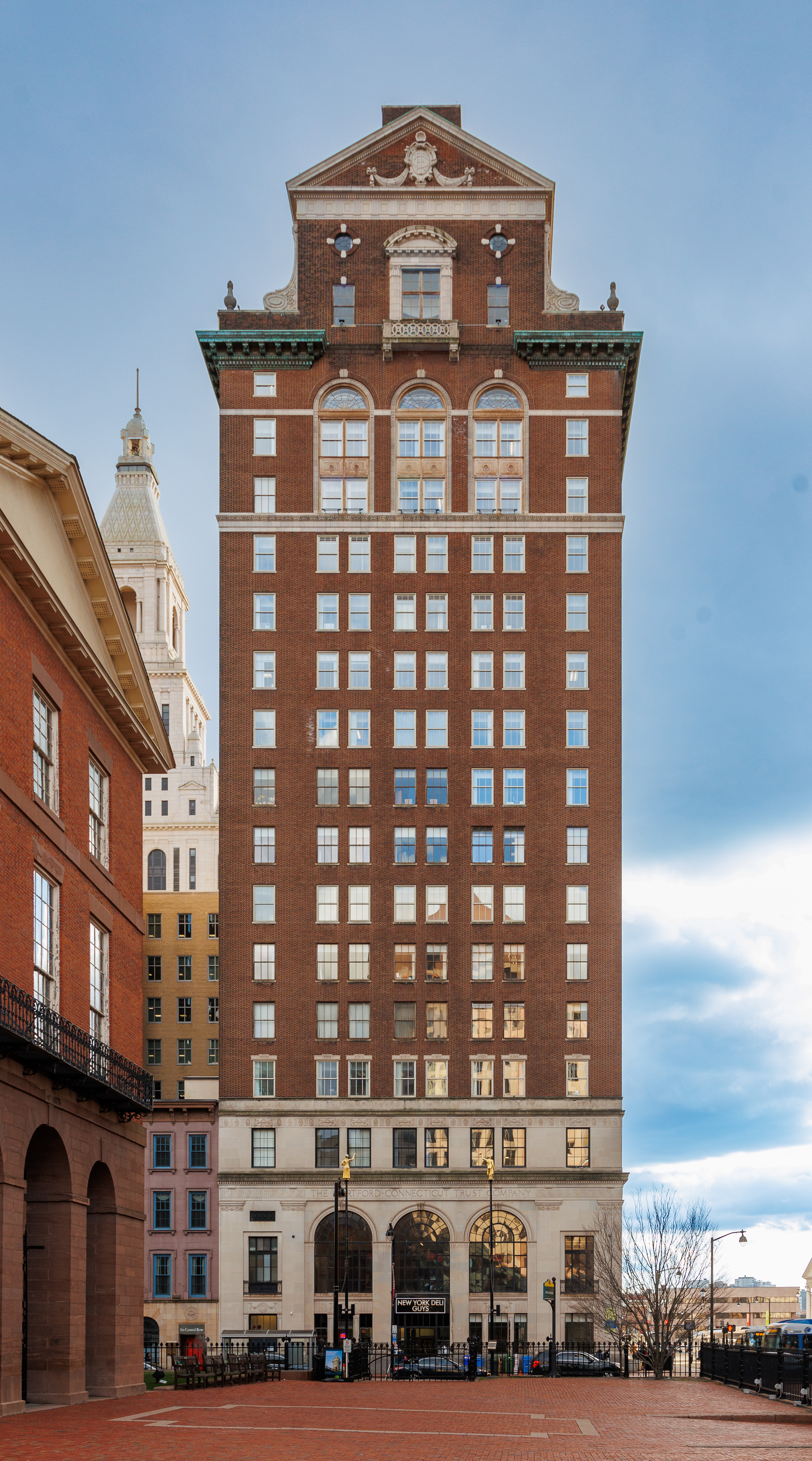

General information
- Type: Skyscraper
- Architectural style: Colonial Revival
- Location: 750 Main Street, Hartford, Connecticut, USA
- Opened: 1920
- Owner: Stark Office Suites

Height
- Top floor: 18

Design and construction
- Architect: Benjamin Wistar Morris
- Architecture firm: Morris & O’Connor

The Stark Building, known until 2018 as The Hartford Trust Company Building, is a 1920 skyscraper located in downtown Hartford, Connecticut.

== History ==
The Hartford Trust Company Building, now known as The Stark Building, was built across from the Old State House in downtown Hartford, CT, and is an example of 1920s Colonial Revival skyscrapers. Incorporating the architectural style based on the classical column, the detailing is meant to link the building stylistically to the Old State House.

The building was designed by the firm of Morris & O’Connor and built in 1920. Design was led by the architect Benjamin Wistar Morris.

The lobby entrance has brass, glass, wood, and marble floors, and a large walk-in safe in the basement remains as a testament to the history of the building. The building was also the location for the World's first pay telephone – a marker appears on the building as designation.

In 1998 the building was purchased by Boxer Properties of Houston for $1.5 million, and in 2017 the building was acquired by Stark Office Suites for $4.3 million. It was renamed The Stark Building in November 2018.
