= Liberty Building (Des Moines, Iowa) =

- U.S. National Register of Historic Places
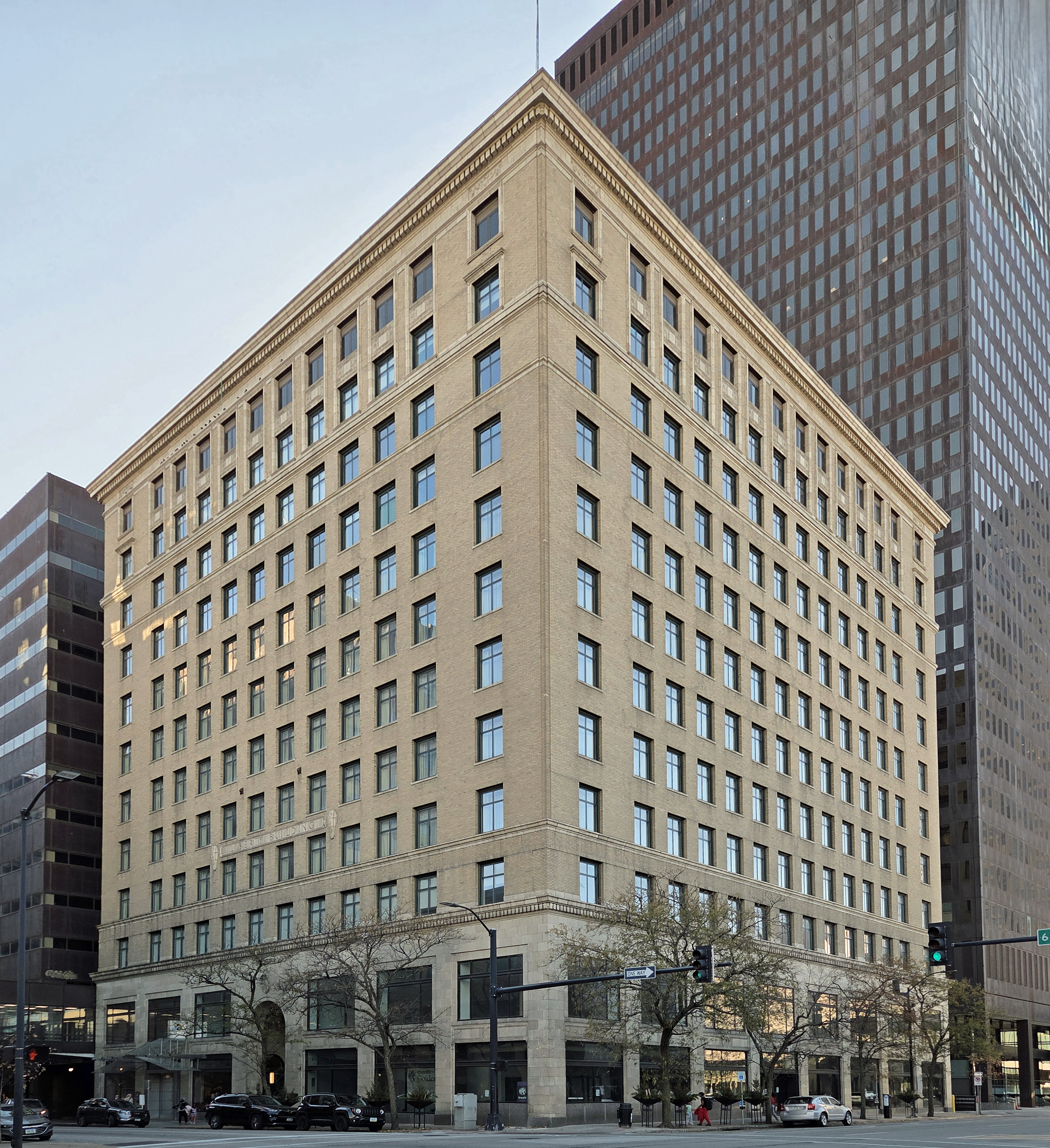
- The Liberty Building viewed from the northeast

- Location within Iowa Location within the United States
- Location: 418 6th Avenue, Des Moines, Iowa
- Coordinates: 41°35′15″N 93°37′32″W
- Area: less than one acre
- Built: 1923
- Architect: Proudfoot, Bird & Rawson
- Architectural style: Chicago School
- NRHP reference No.: 10000488
- Added to NRHP: July 22, 2010

The Liberty Building is a historic building in downtown Des Moines, Iowa, United States. It has been a downtown landmark since 1923. The Liberty Building is located at the southwest corner of 6th Avenue and Grand Avenue in the heart of downtown Des Moines. The building was originally home to Bankers Life Insurance & WHO (AM) Radio. Designed by the prominent Des Moines architectural firm of Proudfoot, Bird & Rawson, the 12-story building rises to a height of 174 feet (53 m).

The building consists of retail, office and residential spaces. In 2008, Nelson Construction and K.C. Holdings completely rehabilitated the building. Shiffler Associates Architects designed the remodel. There is office space available on floors 4,5, and 6, and storefront space on the 1st floor. The building currently houses a gym and fitness center on the 1st and 2nd floor and a bank on the second and third floors. It is connected to the Des Moines Skywalk system.

Currently, the Liberty building is housing Hyatt Place Hotel, designed by Slingshot Architecture, as well as condos on several floors. First Hospitality Group and Baker Group own the building. It was listed on the National Register of Historic Places in 2010.
