= International incident =

Dispute between two or more states

An international incident (or diplomatic incident) is a dispute between two or more states that is not settled judicially.

International incidents can arise from unanticipated actions involving citizens, government officials, or armed units of one or more states, or out of a deliberate but small provocative action by espionage agents of one state, or by terrorists, against another state.

An international incident usually arises during a time of relative peace between states, and in general is, on the surface, an unexpected event. Conflicts that grow out of a series of escalating skirmishes between states generally are not considered international incidents; however, terrorist actions can and often do become international incidents. However, historical views of past international incidents often reveal the incident was the flashpoint of a simmering conflict between states, or organizations opposing states.

Wars have often been provoked by international incidents, and diplomatic efforts to prevent international incidents from growing into full-scale armed conflicts often have been unsuccessful. In the aftermath of the First World War, the League of Nations was established to help nations who were parties to an international incident achieve a solution to the incident through diplomatic means. Initially, the League of Nations had some success in working to find diplomatic solutions, however the failure of the League of Nations to prevent World War II resulted in the disbandment of the League of Nations in favor of the United Nations. As with its predecessor, the United Nations provides a means by which nations involved in an international incident can work to resolve the matter diplomatically rather than through the use of force.

The term is also applied to various incidents that can disrupt international commerce, and to celebrities or other well-known people who commit gaffes or otherwise act inappropriately, causing the press and sometimes governments to criticize their actions.

The International Court of Justice keeps a list of legal disputes between states, many of which result from international incidents. The incidents listed may or may not conform to the definitions given above.

== Examples of international incidents ==
=== 18th century ===
- Battle of Jumonville Glen (1754)
- Hanging of Joshua Huddy (1782)
- XYZ affair (1797–1798)

=== 19th century ===
- Caroline Affair, which had a great effect on the development of international law (1837–1842)
- Trent affair (1861)
- María Luz Incident (1872)
- Fashoda Incident, encounter of British and French forces whilst the countries vied for imperial influence in Africa (1898)
- USS Maine, which exploded in Havana

=== 20th century ===
- Dogger Bank incident - Russian ships mistook a British trawler fleet with the Japanese Fleet (1904)
- Tampico Affair (1914)
- Assassination of Archduke Franz Ferdinand - Set off the First World War (1914)
- Sinking of the RMS Lusitania - Moved the US closer to WW1 involvement (1915)
- Zimmermann Telegram - Proposed alliance between Germany and Mexico in WW1 (1917)
- Bodyline Ashes (1932–33)
- USS Panay incident (1937)
- Tientsin incident (1939)
- Gleiwitz incident - False-flag attack by Germany on itself to justify the invasion of Poland (1939)
- Zoot Suit Riots - Naval pogrom against Mexican-Americans that resulted in a formal complaint from the Mexican government (1943)
- Amethyst Incident (1949)
- Lavon Affair (1954)
- Parking violations at a Filipino diplomatic mission (1959)
- Garden of Eden ballet - scene in Can-Can that famously scandalized Nikita Khrushchev during his state visit to the United States (1959)
- U-2 Crisis of 1960
- Gulf of Tonkin Incident (1964)
- USS Liberty incident (1967)
- USS Pueblo incident (1968)
- Dagmar Hagelin (1977)
- Iran Hostage Crisis (1979–1981)
- Korean Air Flight 007 (1983)
- The sinking of the Rainbow Warrior (1985)
- 1986 West Berlin discotheque bombing
- USS Stark incident (1987)
- Shooting-down of Iran Air Flight 655 in 1988
- Pan Am Flight 103 (1988)
- Yinhe incident (1993)
- Cavalese cable car disaster (1998)
- United States bombing of the Chinese embassy in Belgrade (1999)
- Elián González (1999)

=== 21st century ===
- Ehime Maru and USS Greeneville collision (2001)
- Hainan Island incident (2001)
- September 11 attacks (2001)
- The May 2006 execution in Texas of Mexican national Jesús Ledesma Aguilar
- The poisoning of Alexander Litvinenko in London (2006)
- 2007 Iranian seizure of Royal Navy personnel
- ¿Por qué no te callas?, response given by King Juan Carlos I of Spain to Hugo Chávez, president of Venezuela, at the 2007 Ibero-American Summit (Santiago, Chile)
- ROKS Cheonan sinking (2010)
- 2010 Gaza flotilla raid
- 2010 Israel–Lebanon border clash
- Shelling of Yeonpyeong (2010)
- 2011 NATO attack in Pakistan (2011)
- 2012 Italian shooting of unarmed Indian fishermen in the Arabian sea
- Scarborough Shoal standoff (2012)
- Retention of the Argentinian frigate Libertad in Ghana (2012)
- Devyani Khobragade incident (2013)
- 2013 Lahad Datu standoff
- 2014 Panama–Venezuela diplomatic crisis
- The shootdown of Malaysia Airlines Flight 17 (2014)
- 2016 attack on the Saudi diplomatic missions in Iran
- Lu Yan Yuan Yu 010 (2016)
- Poisoning of Sergei and Yulia Skripal (2018)
- Killing of Jamal Khashoggi (2018)
- Kerch Strait incident (2018)
- Detention of Paul Whelan (2018–2024)
- 2018 Panama–Venezuela diplomatic crisis
- 2019 El Paso shooting
- 2020 Baghdad International Airport airstrike
- Ukraine International Airlines Flight 752 (2020)
- Arrest of Alex Saab (2020)
- 2021 Suez Canal obstruction
- Ryanair Flight 4978 and the arrest of Roman Protasevich (2021)
- Novak Djokovic COVID-19 scandal (2022)
- Detention of Brittney Griner (2022)
- 2023 Chinese balloon incident
- 2023 Black Sea drone incident
- Detention of Evan Gershkovich (2023–2024)
- Assassination of Hardeep Singh Nijjar (2023)
- 2023 Guayana Esequiba crisis
- Rio Grande barrier (2023)
- Southeast Asia exclusivity controversy of The Eras Tour (2024)
- Arrest of Jorge Glas (2024)
- Jordan Chiles bronze medal dispute (2024)
- Greenland crisis (2025–2026)
- Volodymyr Zelenskyy's White House visit (2025)
- Cyril Ramaphosa's White House visit (2025)
- 2025 United States strikes on Venezuelan boats
- 2025 Georgia Hyundai plant immigration raid
- 2025 China–Japan diplomatic crisis
- Seizure of the Skipper (2025)
- Capture of Nicolás Maduro (2026)
- Detention of Tucker Carlson in Israel (2026)
- Pearl Harbor remark to Sanae Takaichi (2026)
- Avignon Papacy threat by the Pentagon (2026)
- Israeli espionage against the United States (2026)
- 2026 Morocco–Spain border incident
- October Starlink outage in Ukraine (2026)

== See also ==
- Diplomacy
- Espionage
- War
- Terrorism
