= Meycauayan Tree =

Historic tree in Bulacan, Philippines

Coordinates: 14°44′05″N 120°57′26″E

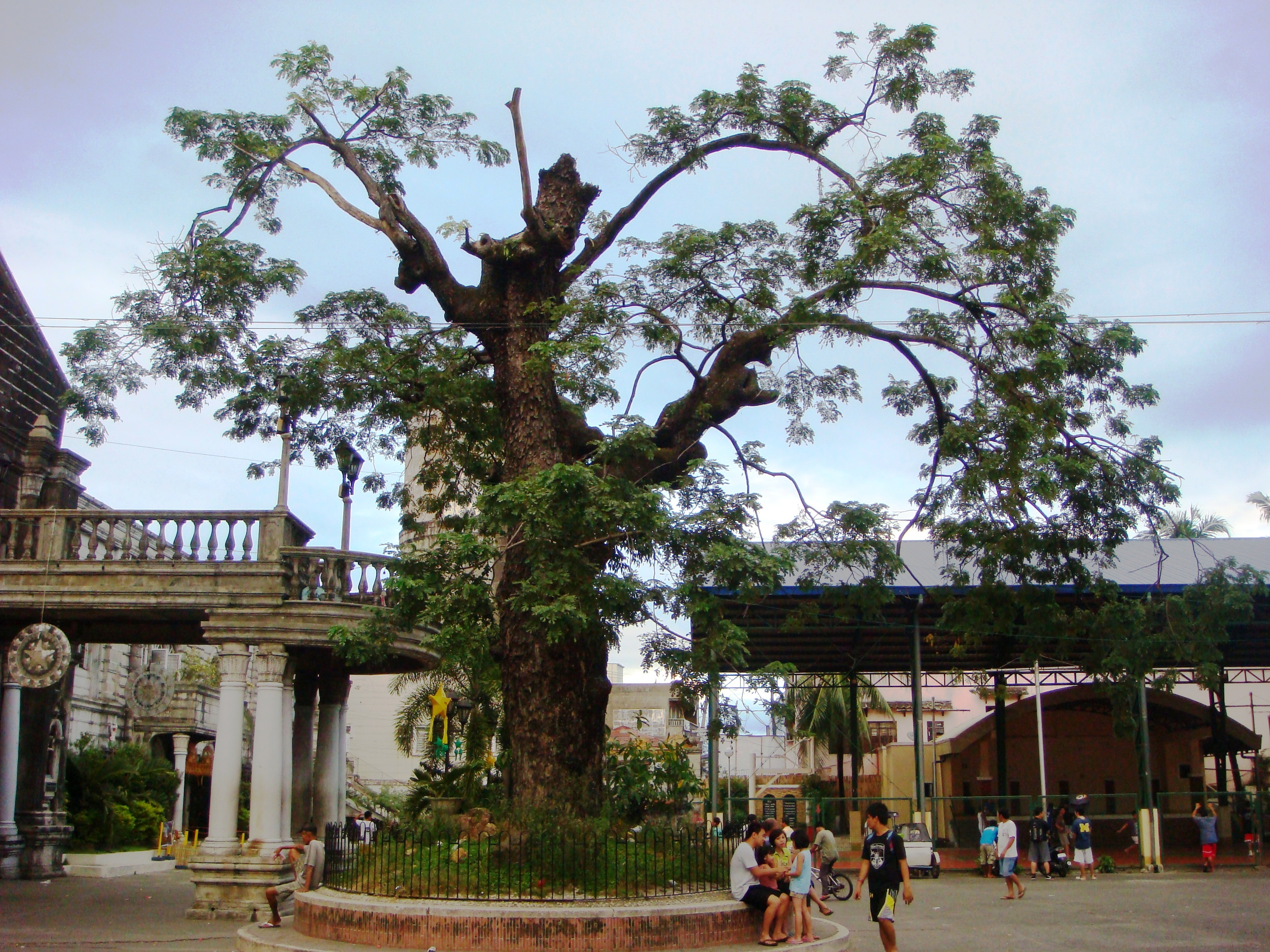
Meycauayan Tree (Acacia Tree)

Meycauayan Tree is one of the three acacia trees (Samanea saman) located in the patio of the Parish Church of St. Francis of Assisi in Meycauayan City, Bulacan, Philippines. Planted by an unknown person, it has stood on the grounds of the parish church for almost a century and a half.

The Meycauayan Tree planted in front of the facade of the church bears historic significance. In 1890, Manuel L. Quezon serving as a young sexton at this church used to play under this tree. In 1982, the Tree Preservation Foundation of the Philippines recognized the tree and installed a marker. The marker was lost sometime in 2004 to thieves and was replaced in 2014.
