= Peoples Gas Building =

Office building in Chicago, Illinois

- Peoples Gas Light and Coke Building
- U.S. National Register of Historic Places
- Chicago Landmark
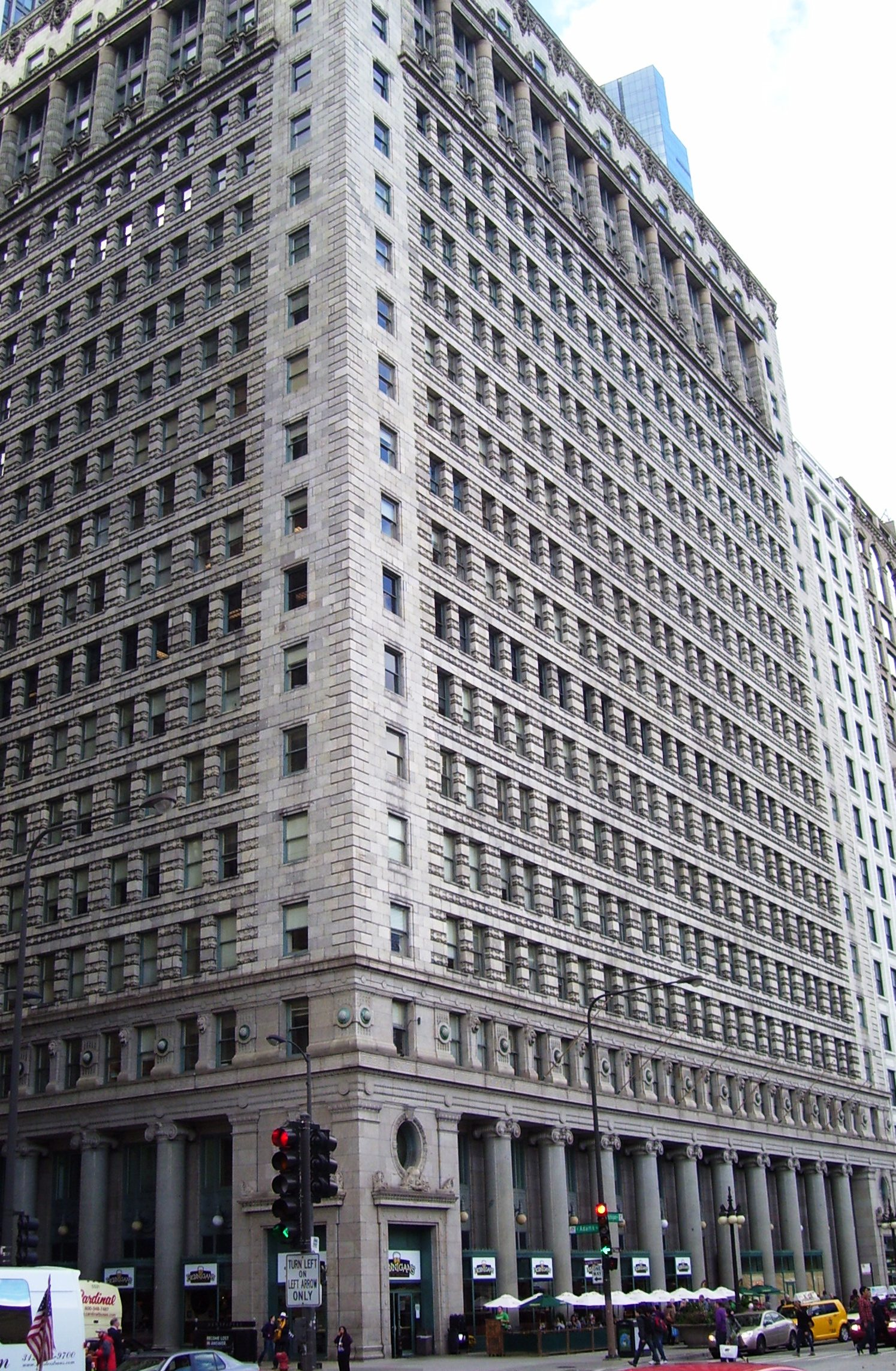
- (2011)

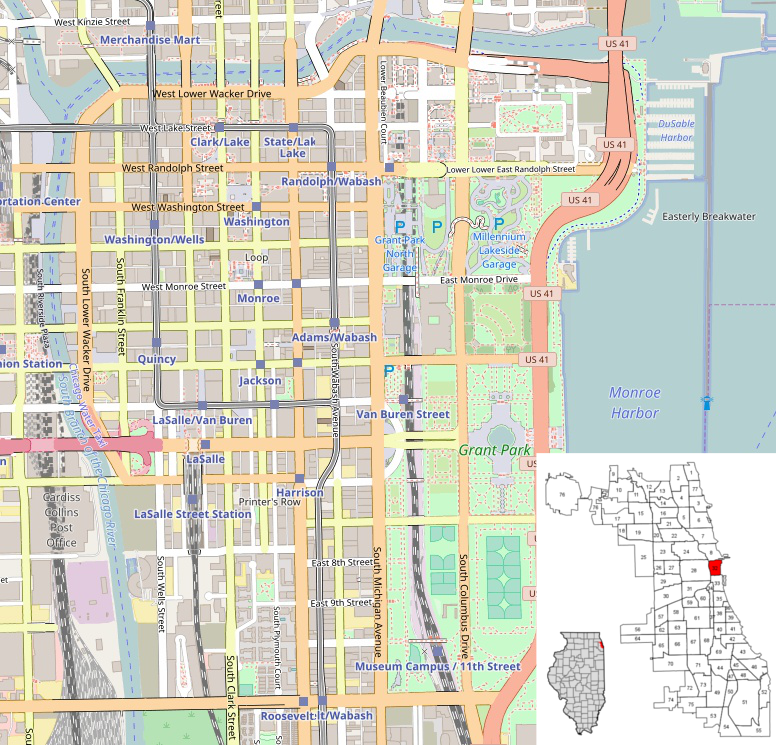
- Location within Chicago Loop
- Location: 122 S. Michigan Avenue (80 East Adams Street); Chicago, Illinois 60603
- Coordinates: 41°52′47.46″N 87°37′29.77″W
- Built: 1911
- Architect: Daniel Burnham & Company
- Architectural style: Beaux-Arts
- NRHP reference No.: 84000293
- Added to NRHP: 1984

The Peoples Gas Building is an office building at 122 South Michigan Avenue on the corner of Adams Street in the Loop community area of Chicago, Illinois.

== Description and history ==
The 265-foot (81 m) 21-story office building was built from 1910 to 1911 and was designed by D.H. Burnham & Company.

The building was added to the National Register of Historic Places in 1984, and is also a contributing property for Chicago's Michigan Boulevard Historic District.

Since 1999 the building hosts National Louis University.

Since November 5, 2012, the building's sixteenth floor has hosted the chancery of the Philippine Consulate General in Chicago.

== Tenants ==
- Axa Assistance
