= List of diplomatic missions and trade organizations in Chicago =

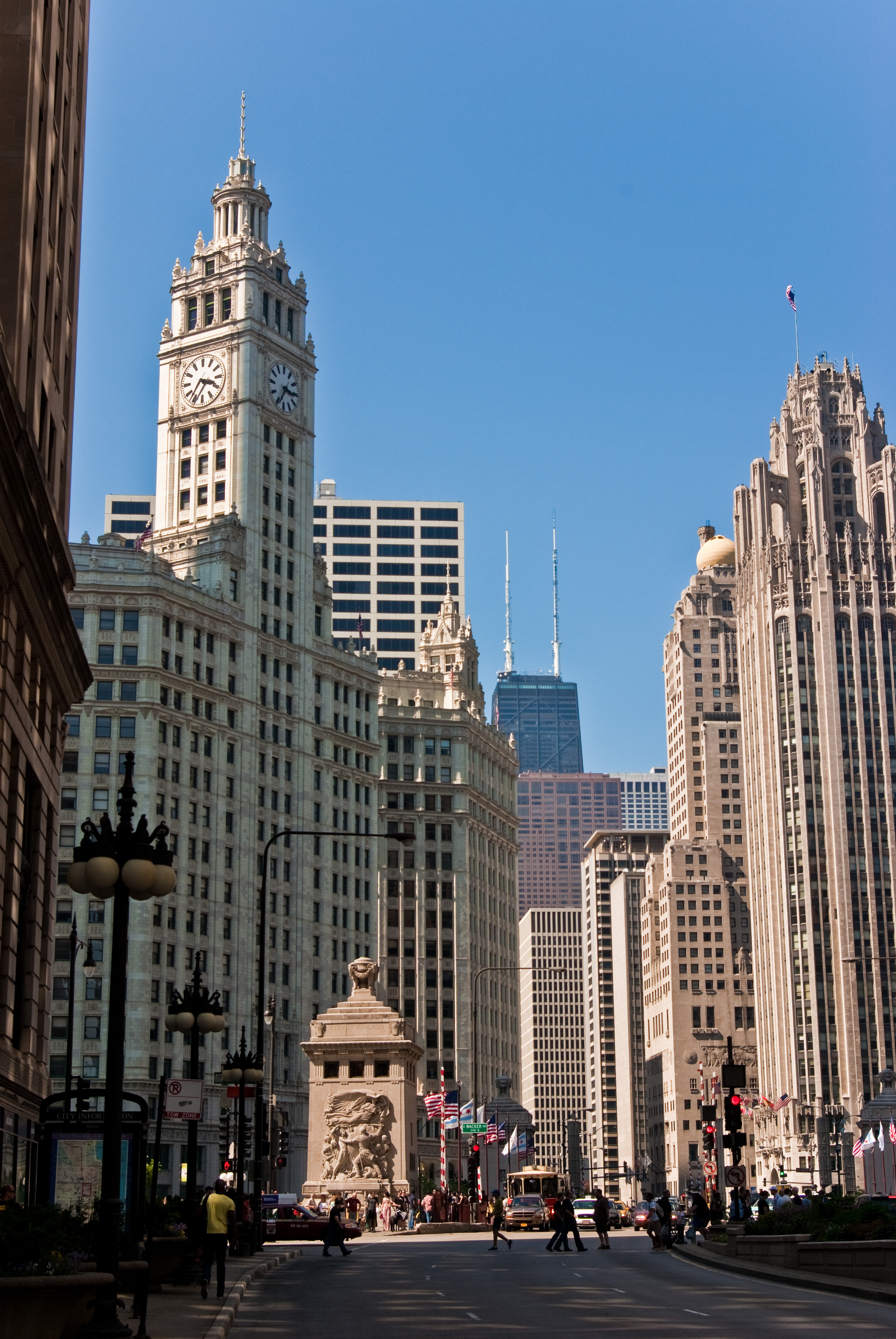
Looking north over the Michigan Avenue (DuSable) Bridge. Most consulates are on or near Michigan Avenue in the central sections of Chicago

This is a list of diplomatic missions and trade organizations in Chicago. Many governments and organizations have established diplomatic and trade representation in Chicago, Illinois.

== Consulates general and honorary consulates ==
Consulates-General are staffed by career consulate foreign nationals, usually with full diplomatic protection. Honorary consuls are accredited US citizens or residents who have official standing but are usually part-time The United States Department of State's Chicago regional office serves these missions.

Country	Mission	Website	Address	Neighborhood or town	Image
Argentina	Consulate-General	cchic.mrecic.gov.ar	205 North Michigan Avenue, Suite 4209	Chicago Loop	
Armenia	Honorary Consulate		120 West Kinzie St., Chicago, IL 60654	River North	
Australia	Consulate-General	chicago.consulate.gov.au	123 North Wacker Drive, Suite 1330	Chicago Loop	
Austria	Honorary Consulate	www.bmeia.gv.at	203 N. LaSalle Street, Suite 2500	Chicago Loop	
Barbados	Honorary Consulate		6033 North Sheridan Road, 26-D	Edgewater	
Belgium	Honorary Consulate		1713 West Beach Avenue	Wicker Park	
Belize	Honorary Consulate		780 Lee Street	Des Plaines, Illinois	
Bosnia and Herzegovina	Consulate-General	cgbhchicago.com	500 North Michigan Avenue, Suite 750	Magnificent Mile	
Brazil	Consulate-General	chicago.itamaraty.gov.br	401 North Michigan Avenue, Suite 1850	Magnificent Mile	
Bulgaria	Consulate-General	mfa.bg/embassies/usagc3	737 North Michigan Avenue, Suite 2105	Magnificent Mile	
Canada	Consulate-General		Two Prudential Plaza, Suite 2400	Chicago Loop	
Chile	Consulate-General	chile.gob.cl/chicago	1415 North Dayton Street, Second Floor	Near North Side	
China	Consulate-General	chicago.china-consulate.gov.cn	100 West Erie Street	Magnificent Mile	
Colombia	Consulate-General	chicago.consulado.gov.co	500 North Michigan Avenue, Suite 1960	Magnificent Mile	
Croatia	Consulate-General	mvep.hr	737 North Michigan Avenue, Suite 1030	Magnificent Mile	
Cyprus	Honorary Consulate		1875 Dempster Street, Suite 555	Park Ridge, Illinois	
Czech Republic	Consulate-General	mzv.cz/chicago	205 North Michigan Avenue, Suite 1680	Chicago Loop	
Denmark	Consulate-General	usa.um.dk chicago	875 N. Michigan Avenue, Suite 3950	Magnificent Mile	
Dominican Republic	Consulate-General	drchicagoconsulate.com	8770 West Bryn Mawr Avenue, Suite 1300	O'Hare	
Ecuador	Consulate-General	cancilleria.gob.ec/chicago	30 South Michigan Avenue, Suite 204	Chicago Loop	
Egypt	Consulate-General		500 North Michigan Avenue, Suite 1900	Magnificent Mile	
El Salvador	Consulate-General		104 South Michigan Avenue, Suite 816	Chicago Loop	
Estonia	Honorary Consulate		410 North Michigan Avenue	Magnificent Mile	
Finland	Honorary Consulate		2246 West Homer Street	Wicker Park	
France	Consulate-General	consulfrance.chicago.org	205 North Michigan Avenue, 37th Floor	Chicago Loop	
Germany	Consulate-General	germany.info/chicago	676 North Michigan Avenue, Suite 3200	Magnificent Mile	
Greece	Consulate-General	mfa.gr/usa chicago	650 North Saint Clair Street	Magnificent Mile	
Grenada	Honorary Consulate		438 West St. James Place	Lincoln Park	
Guatemala	Consulate-General	consulguatechicago.org	205 North Michigan Avenue, Suite 2350	Chicago Loop	
Haiti	Consulate-General	haitianconsulatechicago.com/	11 East Adams Street, Suite 1400	Chicago Loop	
Honduras	Consulate-General	hondurasemb.org/consulados	4439 West Fullerton Avenue	Hermosa	
Hungary	Consulate-General	chicago.mfa.gov.hu	303 East Wacker Drive, Unit 2050	Chicago Loop	
Iceland	Honorary Consulate		2221 Camden Court, Suite 200	Oak Brook, Illinois	
India	Consulate-General	https://www.cgichicago.gov.in/	455 North Cityfront Plaza Drive, Suite 850	Magnificent Mile	
Indonesia	Consulate-General	indonesiachicago.org	211 North Carpenter Street	West Loop	
Ireland	Consulate-General	dfa.ie	400 North Michigan Avenue, Suite 911	Magnificent Mile	
Israel	Consulate-General	embassies.gov.il	500 West Madison Street, Suite 3100	West Loop	
Italy	Consulate-General	conschicago.esteri.it/consolato_chicago/en/	500 North Michigan Avenue, Suite 1850	Magnificent Mile	
Jamaica	Honorary Consulate		4655 South Dr. Martin Luther King Drive, Suite 20	Kenwood	
Japan	Consulate-General	chicago.us.emb-japan.go.jp	737 North Michigan Avenue, Suite 1100	Magnificent Mile	
Jordan	Honorary Consulate		12559 South Holiday Drive	Alsip, Illinois	
South Korea	Consulate-General	overseas.mofa.go.kr/us-chicago-en/index.do	455 North Cityfront Plaza Drive, 27th Floor	Magnificent Mile	
Latvia	Honorary Consulate		230 West Monroe Street, Suite 1125	Chicago Loop	
Liberia	Honorary Consulate		7342 South Bennett Avenue	South Shore	
Liechtenstein	Honorary Consulate		70 West Madison Street, Suite 3100	Chicago Loop	
Lithuania	Consulate-General	chicago.mfa.lt	455 North Cityfront Plaza Drive, Suite 800	Magnificent Mile	
Luxembourg	Honorary Consulate		1340 Dodson Avenue	Elburn, Illinois	
Macedonia	Consulate-General	missions.gov.mk	121 West Wacker Drive, Suite 2036	Chicago Loop	
Malta	Honorary Consulate		22 Clarington Way	Barrington, Illinois	
Mauritius	Honorary Consulate		1000 Corporate Boulevard, Suite A	Aurora, Illinois	
Mexico	Consulate-General	consulmex.sre.gob.mx/chicago/index.php/inicio	204 South Ashland Avenue	Near West Side	
Monaco	Honorary Consulate		606 West Arlington Place	Lincoln Park	
Mongolia	Honorary Consulate		4701 West Rice Street	Humboldt Park	
Morocco	Honorary Consulate		950 North Michigan Avenue, 5502	Magnificent Mile	
Nepal	Honorary Consulate		100 West Monroe Street, Suite 500	Chicago Loop	
Netherlands	Consulate-General	www.netherlandsworldwide.nl/contact/embassies-consulates-general/united-states/consulate-general-chicago	303 East Wacker Drive, Suite 2600	Chicago Loop	
New Zealand	Honorary Consulate	www.mfat.govt.nz	6400 Shafer Court, Suite 275	Rosemont, Illinois	
Norway	Honorary Consulate	www.NorwayInIL.com	200 West Madison Street; Ste 3300	Chicago Loop	
Pakistan	Consulate-General	cgpkchicago.org	333 North Michigan Avenue, Suite 728	Chicago Loop	
Peru	Consulate-General	conperuchicago.com	333 N Michigan Avenue, Suite 2200	Chicago Loop	
Philippines	Consulate-General	chicagopcg.com	116 South Michigan Avenue, Suite 1600	Chicago Loop	
Poland	Consulate-General	gov.pl/web/usa-en/consulate-chicago	1530 North Lakeshore Drive	Gold Coast	
Portugal	Honorary Consulate		71 South Wacker Drive, Suite 2930	Chicago Loop	
Romania	Consulate-General	chicago.mae.ro	737 North Michigan Avenue, Suite 1170	Magnificent Mile	
Rwanda	Honorary Consulate		2100 Enterprise Avenue	Geneva, Illinois	
Sao Tome and Principe	Honorary Consulate		645 West Park Avenue, Suite B	Libertyville, Illinois	
Serbia	Consulate-General	chicago.mfa.gov.rs	201 East Ohio Street Suite 200	Magnificent Mile	
Singapore	Honorary Consulate		One South Dearborn Street, 24th Floor	Chicago Loop	
Slovakia	Honorary Consulate	www.mzv.sk	34 S Washington Street	Naperville, Illinois	
Slovenia	Honorary Consulate		14252 Main Street	Lemont, Illinois	
South Africa	Consulate-General		200 South Michigan Avenue, Suite 600	Chicago Loop	
Spain	Consulate-General	exteriores.gob.es Chicago	180 North Michigan Avenue Suite 1500	Chicago Loop	
Sri Lanka	Honorary Consulate		540 North Lincoln Street	Hinsdale, Illinois	
Sweden	Honorary Consulate	chicagoconsulateofsweden.org	5211 North Clark Street	Andersonville Commercial Historic District	
Switzerland	Honorary Consulate		201 Victoria Lane	Elk Grove Village, Illinois	
Taiwan	Economic and Cultural Office	roc-taiwan.org/uschi_en/index.html	Two Prudential Plaza, 57th and 58th Floors, 180 North Stetson Avenue	Grant Park	
Tanzania	Honorary Consulate		937 Whippoorwill Way	Edwardsville, Illinois	
Thailand	Consulate-General	thaiconsulatechicago.org	700 North Rush Street	Magnificent Mile	
Turkey	Consulate-General	chicago.cg.mfa.gov.tr	455 N. Cityfront Plaza, Suite 2900	Chicago Loop	
Uganda	Honorary Consulate		7822 South Dobson Avenue	Avalon Park	
Ukraine	Consulate-General	chicago.mfa.gov.ua/en	10 East Huron Street	Magnificent Mile	
United Kingdom	Consulate-General	gov.uk Chicago	400 North Michigan Avenue, Suite 1300	Magnificent Mile	
Uruguay	Consulate-General	uruguaychicago.org	875 North Michigan Avenue, Suite 1422	Magnificent Mile	

=== Non-sovereign missions ===
Diplomatic missions for territories that do not have full sovereign status are also present in Chicago.

Territory	Mission	Website	Address	Neighborhood or town	Image
Quebec	Government office	www.quebec.ca/en/gouvernement/ministere/relations-internationales/representations-etranger/delegation-quebec-chicago	444 North Michigan Avenue, Suite 3650	Chicago Loop	

== Chambers of commerce ==
- Chicagoland Chamber of Commerce - chicagolandchamber.org
- African American Chamber of Commerce of Aurora
- America-Israel Chamber of Commerce Chicago - americaisrael.org
- American-Russian Chamber of Commerce & Industry - arcci.org
- American Southeast Europe Chamber of Commerce - amsecc.org
- American-Ukrainian Chamber of Commerce & Industry - aucci.org
- Argentine-American Midwest Chamber of Commerce - argentinechamber.com
- Australian New Zealand American Chamber of Commerce—Midwest - anzaccmidwest.org
- Austrian Trade Commission - www.advantageaustria.org/us/
- Basque Trade Commission
- British-American Business Council—Chicago - www.babc-chgo.org
- Bronzeville Black Chamber of Commerce
- Canada-US Business Council - canadianclubofchicago.org
- Chicago Chinatown Chamber of Commerce - chicagochinatown.org
- Chicago Turkish American Chamber of Commerce - ctacc.org
- Continental Africa Chamber of Commerce USA - continentalacc.org
- Dutch Chicago Business Exchange of the Netherland-America Foundation - dcbex.com
- French American Chamber of Commerce Chicago Chapter - facc-chicago.com
- German American Chamber of Commerce of the Midwest - gaccom.org
- Greater O'Hare Association - greater-ohare.com
- Illinois Hispanic Chamber of Commerce - ihccbusiness.net
- Italian American Chamber of Commerce Midwest - iacc-chicago.com
- Japan Chamber of Commerce - jccc-chi.org
- Korean American Chamber of Commerce - ckacc.com
- Midwest Danish American Chamber of Commerce - mwdacc.com
- Mongolian National Chamber of Commerce and Industry - mongolchamber.mn
- Norwegian American Chamber of Commerce, Inc., - nacc-chicago.org
- Philippine-American Chamber of Commerce of Greater Chicago - paccgc.org
- Polish American Chamber of Commerce - polishamericanbusiness.com
- Puerto Rican Chamber of Commerce of Illinois - prcci.com
- Serbian-American Chamber of Commerce - serbianamericanchamber.org
- Southland Chamber of Commerce - chicagosouthland.com
- Swedish American Chamber of Commerce - sacc-usa.org
- Turkish-American Chamber of Commerce and Industry Midwest - tacci-midwest.org
- United States of America-China Chamber of Commerce - usccc.org
- U.S. India Chamber of Commerce Midwest - uiccm.org
- U.S. Mexico Chamber of Commerce Mid-America Chapter - usmcoc.org
- U.S. Pan-Asian Chamber of Commerce Midwest Chapter - uspaaccef-midwest.org
- U.S.-Qatar Business Council - usqbc.org
- The Zhejiang Chamber of Commerce in USA (ZCCU) - zccausa.org

== Trade organizations ==
- Advantage West Midlands and East Midlands Development Agency - thebritishmidlands.com
- American Association of Translators
- American Egyptian Cooperation Foundation
- Arab-American Business and Professional Association - a-abpa.org
- Asian American Alliance
- Asian American Small Business Association of Chicago
- Association of Chinese Scientists & Engineers USA (ACSE) - acse.org
- Belgian Business Club of Chicago
- British-American Business Council Chicago - babcc.org
- Business France North America - www.businessfrance.fr/en/home
- Canada-US Business Council - cusbc.org
- Chicago Council on Global Affairs - thechicagocouncil.org
- Chicago International Dispute Resolution Association (CIDRA)
- Chicago/Ireland Business Development Association
- Chicago Sister Cities International Program
- Conference Board Inc.
- CzechTrade czechtrade-usa.us
- Dutch Chicago Business Exchange - thenafchicago.org
- Embassy of France Economic Mission
- Executives' Club of Chicago
- Flanders Investment and Trade - flandersinvestmentandtrade.com
- Food Exporters Association of the Midwest USA - foodexport.org
- FrankfurtRhineMain Corp. - frm-united.com
- Germany Trade & Invest
- Hispanic American Construction Industry Association - haciaworks.org
- IDA Ireland
- Illinois China Coalition
- Indonesian Trade Promotion Center
- International Women Associates, Inc.
- Invest Victoria
- Italian Trade Agency www.ice.it/en/markets/usa/chicago
- Japan External Trade Organization (JETRO) - www.jetro.go.jp/en
- Korean American Merchants Association of Chicago - kacschgo.org
- Latino Technology Association
- Lithuanian Business Council - lbchicago.org
- Lithuanian Trade Office, Inc. - lithuaniantradeoffice.com
- Malaysian Industrial Development
- National Association of Asian-American Professionals – Chicago - naaapchicago.org
- Netherlands Foreign Investment Agency - nfia.com
- New Chicago Japanese American Association
- The North of England
- North American Representative Office of Shenzhen
- NRW INVEST nrwinvestllc.com
- Office of Trade and Investment - www2.illinois.gov/gov/exports
- Overseas Sales and Marketing Association
- Pays de la Loire Region, Atlantic France - Export, International Partnerships and Investment - Chicago Office - www.business-solutions-atlantic-france.com
- Québec Delegation, Chicago
- Scottish Development International USA – Central Region
- Shenyang Government U.S. Economy and Trade Office
- Singapore Economic Development Board
- Small Business Corporation USA (Korea)
- SODEVAL – Valais Economic Dev. Corp.
- South African American Business Club
- Swedish Trade Council (Business Sweden Chicago)
- Swiss Business Hub USA
- Swiss-American Business Council - sabcnow.com
- Taipei Economic & Cultural Office in Chicago - tecochicago.org
- TEDA America Chicago Office (Tianjin China Economic Development Area)
- U.S. Export Assistance Center - export.gov/illinois
- Walloon Export and Foreign Investment Agency - awex.be
