= Century Tower (Chicago) =

Condominium building in Chicago, Illinois

- Trustees System Service Building
- U.S. National Register of Historic Places
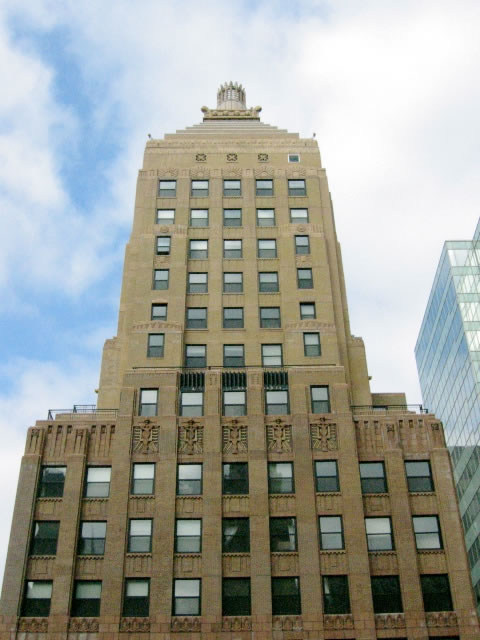

- Location within Chicago metropolitan area Location within Illinois Location within the United States
- Location: Chicago, Illinois
- Coordinates: 41°53′9.61″N 87°38′1.03″W
- Built: 1930
- Architect: Thielbar, Frederick J.; Fugard John Reed
- Architectural style: Skyscraper, Art Deco
- NRHP reference No.: 98001132
- Added to NRHP: September 3, 1998

The Century Tower Condominiums, formerly known as the Trustees System Service Building, is a historic building located at 182 West Lake Street in the Loop in Chicago, Illinois.

== History ==
The building was designed in 1929 and completed in 1930; at the time of its completion, it was the tallest reinforced concrete building in the world. Its original tenant and namesake was the Trustees System Service, a bank that specialized in consumer loans. Architects Thielbar and Fugard designed the building in the Art Deco style. The building's design consists of a twenty-story main building topped by an eight-story tower and a ziggurat. The building has had a long list of various countries' consulates as tenants.

The building was added to the National Register of Historic Places on September 3, 1998.

The property was converted from a commercial building to apartments in 2003. In August, 2004 the building was used to film scenes from the movie Batman Begins. In September 2005 the building became a condominium and its name changed to Century Tower.

== Former tenants ==
The building was once home to:

- WIND (AM) radio.
- WJJD (AM) radio.
- the Belgian consulate.
- the Chinese consulate.
- the Cuban consulate.
- the Dominican consulate.
- the Grecian consulate.
- the Honduran consulate.
- the Hungarian consulate.
- the Italian consulate.
- the Mexican consulate.
- the Philippine consulate.

The red marble used in the lobby is from an ancient Roman quarry in the city of Oran, Algeria.

The building is listed in the National Register of Historic Places.

== Former names ==
This building has formerly been named:

- Skyline Century of Progress
- The Lake and Wells Building
- The 201 Tower
- Corn Products Building
- Trustees System Service Building
