= Trustees System Service (US) =

- Industry: Finance
- Founded: 1914; 112 years ago in Birmingham, Alabama
- Defunct: January 1934
- Fate: Bankruptcy
- Headquarters: Trustees System Service Building, Chicago, Illinois, United States

The Trustees System Service was an American loan and thrift institution founded in Birmingham, Alabama in 1914. It was capitalized by wage earners in the American Midwestern cities in which it operated, and made unsecured loans out of this capital based on borrowers' budgets, income, and reputation for paying their debts. It published credit reports, and wrote insurance policies covering property and life. It established a new headquarters in Chicago, Illinois, where it built the Trustees System Service Building in 1930.

The bank collapsed some years later, and a receiver was appointed in late October 1932. It was held bankrupt in January 1934.
