= Consulate General of the Philippines, Chicago =

Diplomatic mission of the Philippines in Chicago, Illinois, US

Consulate General of the Philippines, Chicago Konsulado Panlahat ng Pilipinas sa Chicago

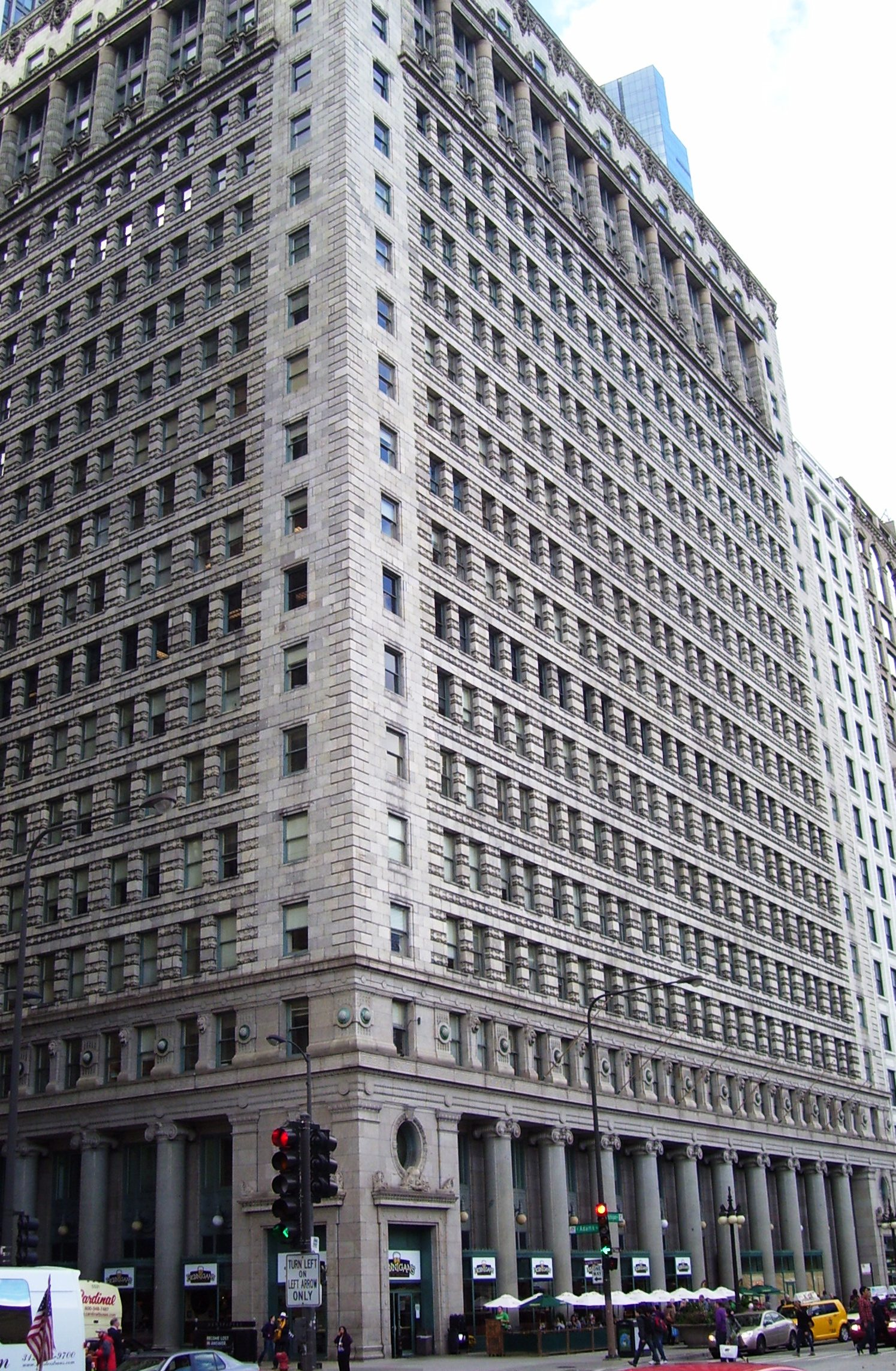
- Location: Chicago
- Address: 122 South Michigan Avenue, Suite 1600
- Coordinates: 41°52′47″N 87°37′29″W
- Consul General: Jesusa Susana V. Paez
- Website: www.chicagopcg.com

The Consulate General of the Philippines in Chicago is a diplomatic mission of the Republic of the Philippines in the United States, representing the country's interests in the state of Illinois. Opened in 1948, it is currently located on the 16th floor of the Peoples Gas Building in the Historic Michigan Boulevard District, part of the Loop community area in downtown Chicago, across from the Art Institute of Chicago.

== History ==
The Philippine Consulate General in Chicago was opened in 1948, the fourth Philippine consulate to open in the United States after the first three consulates general were opened by the country's newly established Department of Foreign Affairs (DFA) the year before. Leopoldo T. Ruiz, an academic who would later become the first Filipino president of the then American-run Silliman University, served as the mission's first consul general.

In 1959, the consulate was involved in a minor diplomatic incident over traffic tickets issued by the Chicago Police Department (CPD). The CPD had left tickets on consular vehicles which were parked on the street in a no-parking zone, although because the vehicles were registered to accredited diplomats, they could not be issued traffic tickets and were exempt from the city's parking regulations. Arsenio Lacson, the mayor of Manila, threatened to cancel similar courtesies extended to vehicles of the United States Embassy in Manila if the tickets continued to be issued.

During the presidency of Ferdinand Marcos, the Consulate became one of the first missions to host an office of the then-newly formed Commission on Filipinos Overseas, although the following year it was named as one of a number of "overstaffed" posts, with excess personnel being recalled as part of a wider rationalization program that also led to the shrinking of the Philippines' diplomatic presence abroad.

== Chancery ==
The chancery of the Philippine Consulate General in Chicago has moved a number of times in the mission's history.

At the time of its opening in 1948, the consulate was located in the Century Tower at 201 Wells Street, subsequently moving some time later to the Michigan Avenue corridor. It first moved to 6 North Michigan Avenue (also known as the Montgomery Ward Building), where it was located until November 1978, when the Consulate leased the entire 21st floor of the Michigan Boulevard Building on 30 North Michigan Avenue to serve as its chancery.

On September 17, 2012, the consulate announced in a press release that it was relocating to the Peoples Gas Building down the street, with the new chancery promising to provide upgraded facilities and a better experience for visitors and guests. The new chancery opened nearly two months later on November 5, 2012.

The Consulate occasionally serves as a venue for demonstrations relating to issues in the Philippines: In 2016, Filipinos in Chicago protested outside the chancery against Marcos's burial at the Libingan ng mga Bayani.

== Staff and activities ==
The Philippine Consulate General in Chicago is headed by Consul General Jesusa Susana V. Paez, who assumed her position on October 20, 2021. Prior to becoming Consul General, Paez, a career diplomat, served as the executive director of the DFA's Office of the Undersecretary for International Economic Relations, and before that served as deputy consul general at the Philippine Consulate General in Toronto.

Currently, the consulate's jurisdiction covers Illinois and the Midwestern United States, both directly and through an honorary consulate in Detroit. Until September 24, 2018, the consulate's jurisdiction also included the western portion of the Southern United States, covering Arkansas, Louisiana, Mississippi and Oklahoma but excluding Texas, which was under the jurisdiction of the Philippine Consulate General in Los Angeles. All five states, as well as an honorary consulate in New Orleans, were subsequently placed under the newly reopened Philippine Consulate General in Houston, with both the Chicago and Los Angeles missions continuing to provide services to Filipinos in those states until December 31, 2018.

The consulate has been active in several cultural endeavors within its jurisdiction. Some of these activities included facilitating the return of a pair of bells stolen from Meycauayan Church during World War II to the Philippines, presenting a lecture on José Rizal in cooperation with the Knights of Rizal, and supporting the holding of events commemorating Filipino American History Month. One of these activities, a lecture on Dean Worcester held in 2014 was hailed as the most relevant activity of the 22 organized for that year's Filipino American History Month.

In addition to these activities, the consulate also regularly conducts outreach activities throughout its jurisdiction, even doing so during major holidays when other missions would normally be closed.

== See also ==
- List of diplomatic missions of the Philippines
- List of diplomatic missions and trade organizations in Chicago
