= Meycauayan Church =

Roman Catholic church in Bulacan, Philippines

- Saint Francis of Assisi Parish Church
- Iglesia Parroquial de San Francisco de Asís (Spanish); Parokya ng San Francisco ng Assisi (Filipino)
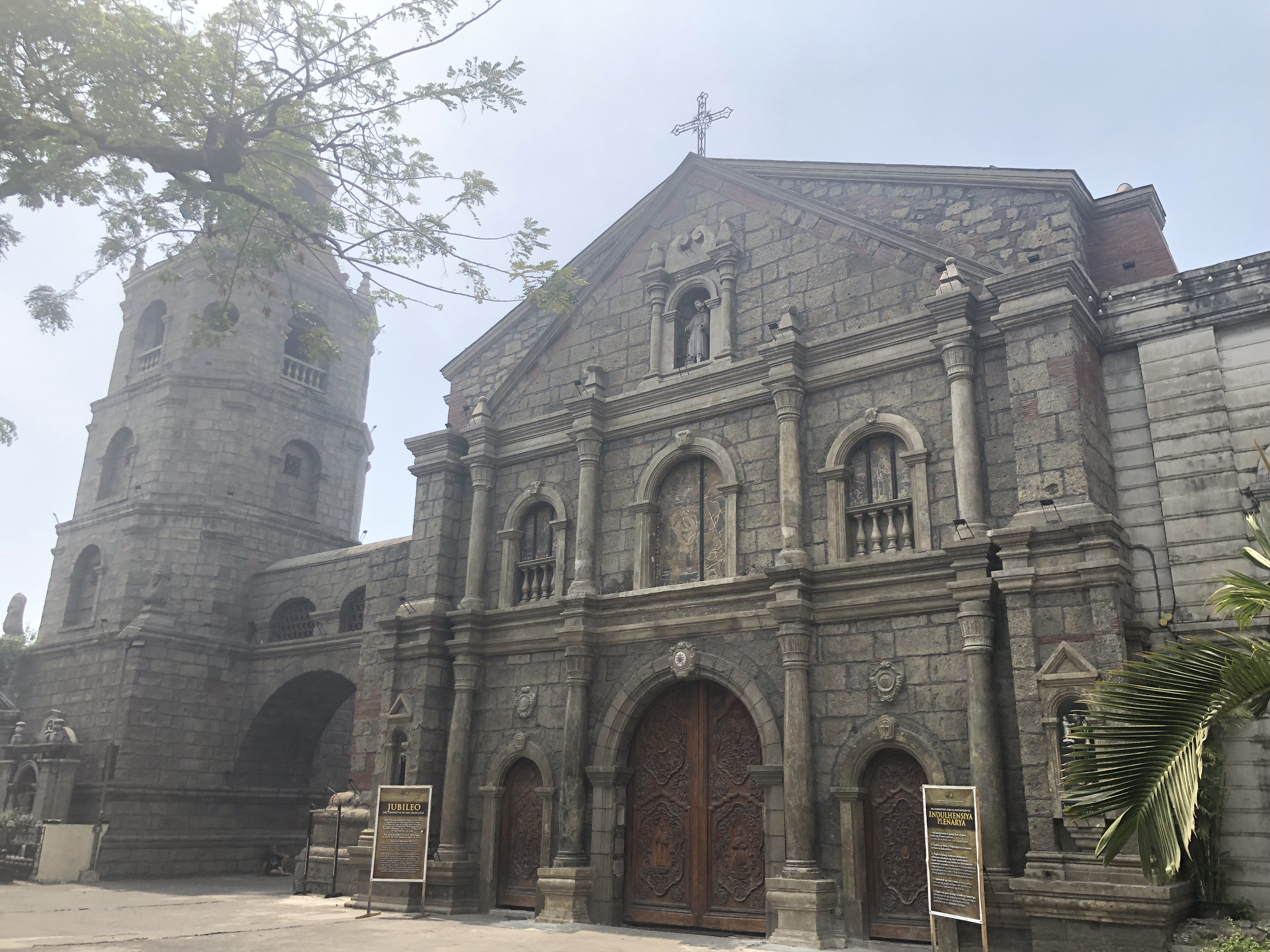
- Church façade in 2026

- Location in Bulacan Location in Luzon Location in the Philippines
- 14°44′06″N 120°57′25″E
- Location: Poblacion, Meycauayan, Bulacan
- Country: Philippines
- Denomination: Roman Catholic
- Website: www.facebook.com/stfrancismeyc

History
- Former name: Iglesia Parroquial de Meycauayan (Spanish)
- Status: Parish church
- Founded: 1578
- Founder(s): Padre Juan de Plasencia; Padre Diego de Oropeza (Franciscan friars)
- Dedication: San Francisco de Asís
- Dedicated: 1984, 2020

Architecture
- Functional status: Active
- Heritage designation: Grade II level
- Architectural type: Church building
- Style: Earthquake Baroque
- Groundbreaking: 1668 (present church)
- Completed: 1956 (Third reconstruction); 2020 (interior restoration); 2023 (facade restoration and retrofitting)

Specifications
- Materials: Adobe masonry, brick tiles

Administration
- District: Southern
- Province: Bulacan
- Archdiocese: Manila
- Diocese: Malolos

Clergy
- Archbishop: Jose Advincula
- Bishop: Dennis C. Villarojo
- Priest: Rev. Fr. Edmundo Santos

Saint Francis of Assisi Parish Church, commonly known as Meycauayan Church or locally as Simbahan sa Bayan, is a Roman Catholic church located in Meycauayan, Bulacan Philippines. It is one of the oldest parishes in Bulacan which even predates the Malolos Cathedral established in 1580 and the Barasoain Church established in 1859. It is also the province's largest parish with an estimated population of about 80,000 parishioners. The church is the seat of the vicariate of St. Francis of Assisi in the Diocese of Malolos.

== History ==
=== Parish foundation ===
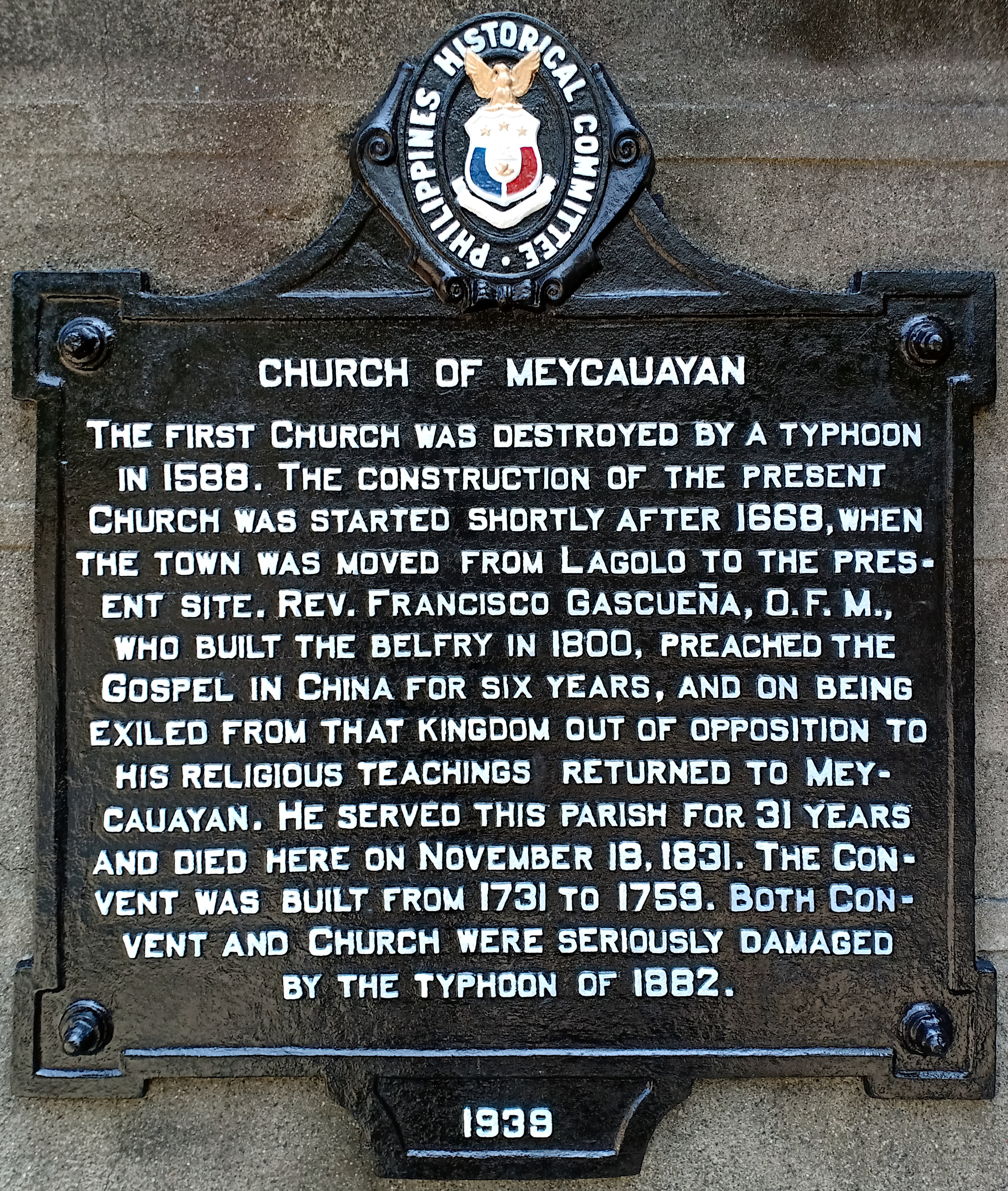
Church PHC historical marker installed in 1939

The parish was founded in 1578 by Fr. Juan de Plasencia and Fr. Diego de Oropeza, the first batch of Franciscan priests to reach the Philippines in 1577. They built a small church made of nipa thatch and bamboo in a small area called Sitio Torril, which is now part of Brgy. Bahay Pare in Meycauayan. The church was blown by a typhoon in 1588.

The Franciscans also brought a wooden missionary cross when they arrived in Meycauayan, similar to Magellan's Cross. The cross was later found to be in the possession of a resident of Brgy. Bahay Pare. [The cross, now known as The Cross of Sitio Torril, is probably the oldest known religious relic in Meycauayan. Every October 4 during the feast day of the town's patron saint, Saint Francis of Assisi, this cross is brought from Brgy. Bahay Pare to the parish church for public veneration.]

=== Transfer to the second site ===
A request was made to build a stone church, and on November 16, 1588, Dr. Santiago de Vera, made justified by such request, instantly dispatch Secretary Gaspar de Azebo to Christoval de Asquera, Mayor of the Province of Meycauayan. By the order of St. Pedro Bautista, it was transferred to a place called Lagolo, by R. P. Fr. Antonio de Nombela, Minister of the town. In 1589, by the decree of the "Superior Govierno", a church made up mainly of adobe (volcanic tuff) was built. The said church was the place of worship of Meycaueños until 1668.

=== Present location ===
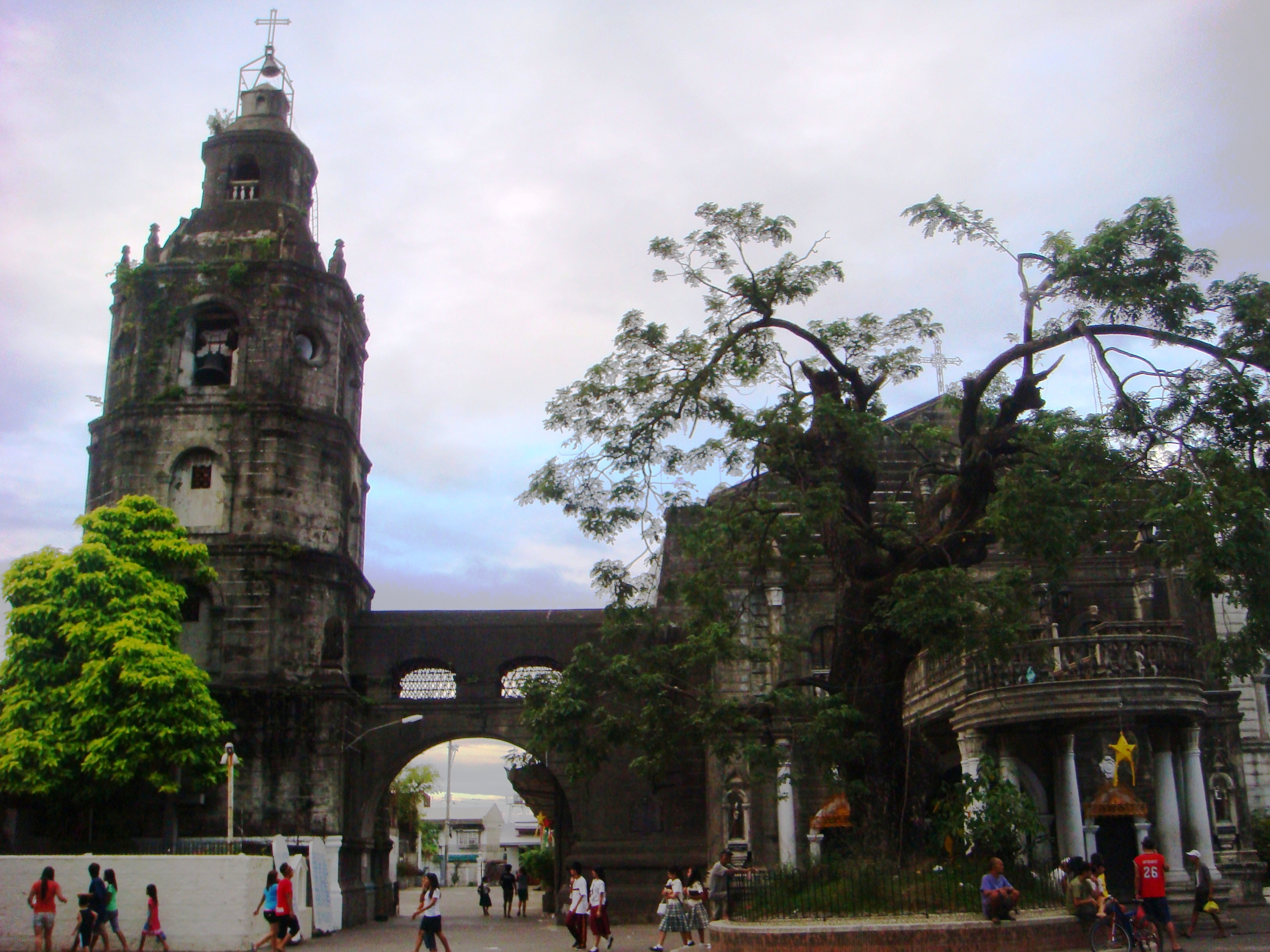
The 1668 Parish Church of St. Francis of Assisi and the patio

The church was transferred to its site in the present poblacion (town center) due to the attacks of the native Aetas. In 1668, Fray Nicolas Santiago started the construction of the stone church that measured "sixty yards long by wide twelve and a half wide" (60 by 12.5 yards (180 by 38 ft; 54.9 by 11.4 m) The church also served as one of the prototypes of city planning in accordance to the Spanish government's reduccion policy; Meycauayan was among the first towns in the colony that has the parish church and the city or municipal hall adjacent to each other, if not housed within the same vicinity. The construction of the present convent was started in 1731 by Fr. Juan Francisco de San Antonio. It was continued by Fray Miguel de San Bernardo and was completed in 1739 under the administration of Fray Jose Sellez. It was described as the best convent among the Franciscan Province of St. Gregory the Great. In 1784, the wooden portions of the church were replaced with hewn-stones by Fray Jose Cantos.

In 1800, the bell tower was constructed by order of Fr. Francisco Gascueña, OFM. The said tower is one of the two of its kind in the Philippines with a large arch bridge connecting the church and the tower. The tower belfry housed five bells named Maria Concepcion, the biggest, which was made by order of Fr. Antonio de Guadalajara in 1878; the San Francisco, dedicated to the town's patron saint made by the order of Fr. Juan Fernandez in 1881; San Jose, the smallest made by the order of Fr. Francisco Gascuena; and two others.

As a result of a furious typhoon, the entire town got flooded in 1802, causing much damages that the value of a sack of rice reached four pesos with four reales the following year. After this crisis, Fr. Gascueña managed to construct the narthex (an arch made of stone sustaining the choir) in 1804. Through the span of thirty-one years, Fr. Gascueña has showed all the kind virtues and charity to the poor, to whom he never denied alms whether they may be their parishioner or from other towns. He died in Meycauayan on November 18, 1831, and was buried beneath the main altar of the church.

Under the direction of Rev. Fr. Balbino de Consuerga, all wooden parts were renovated in 1832. The sacristy was constructed and over it, a spacious hall was added followed by other useful improvements year after year until 1850 when Fr. Benito de Madridejos took over the church and carried the work of his predecessor the best way possible. In 1851, Fr. Benito conducted repairs on several damages inside the church and commissioned a new main altarpiece. In 1853, the convent underwent repairs on which several parts were converted as the Parochial School.

A cemetery gate was constructed in 1880. The church-convent complex was seriously damaged by a strong typhoon in 1882.

=== Secularization ===
The first native clergyman to be assigned as parish priest in Meycauayan was Fr. Esteban Daez, a native of Polo, Obando, Bulacan. He was a coadjutor priest in 1892 before he became the cura parroco interino (interim parish priest) from 1898 to 1900.

=== American occupation ===
Both the Meycauayan Church and convent were occupied and became the temporary headquarters of the American soldiers in May 1899 after it was captured from the Filipinos revolutionaries during the Philippine–American War. Some of the church possessions were believed destroyed or looted during their stay in the church complex. Following its return to the Catholic Church in 1903, a claim was filed by the Catholic Church in the Philippines to be paid by the United States of America regarding the church properties occupied, damaged or otherwise destroyed by American troops from 1899 to 1903 that amounted to 2,200 pesos with a monthly rental of 50 pesos for the convent-turned-to-headquarters.

=== Post-war ===
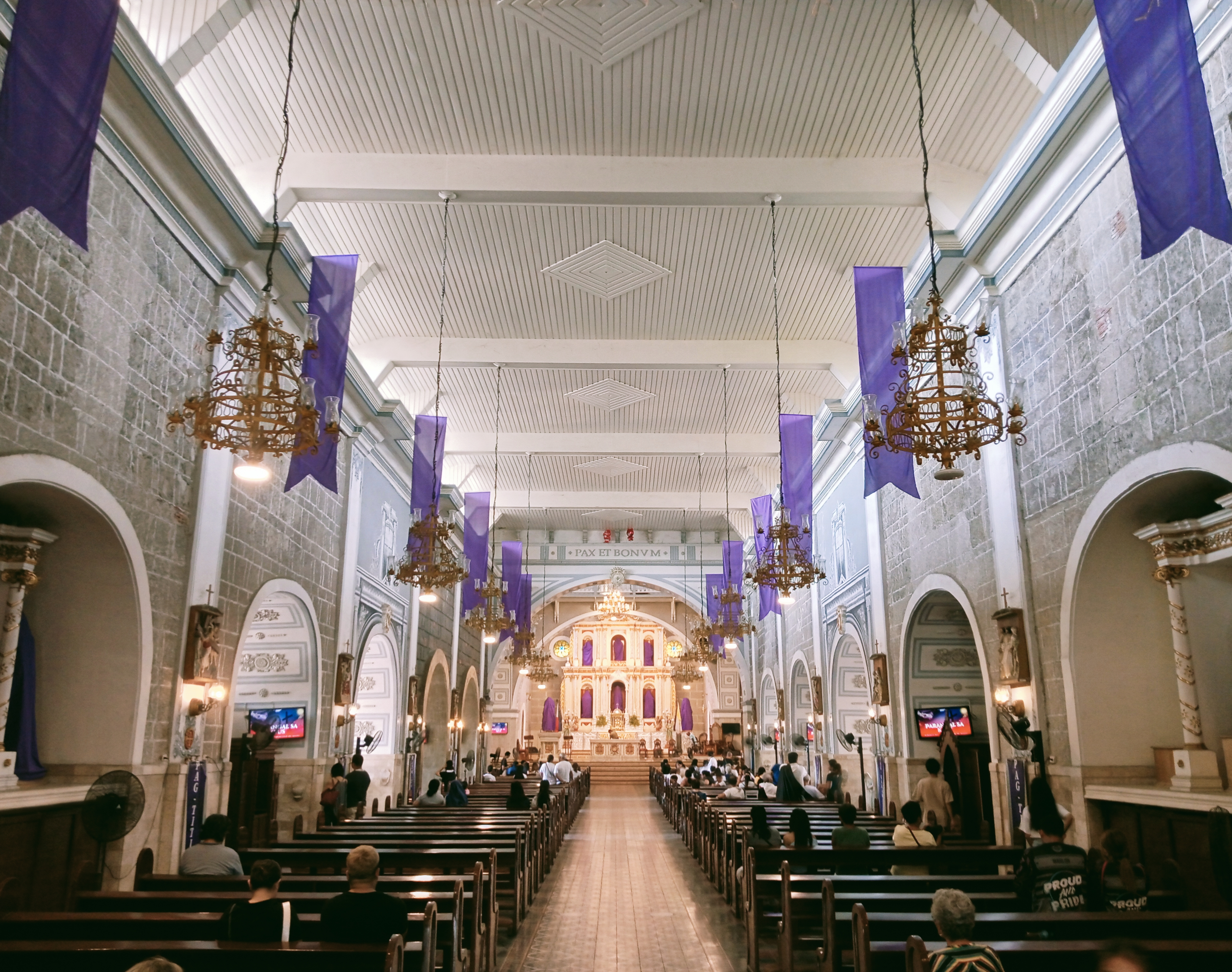
Church interior in 2024

During World War II, the church survived destruction unlike the churches in Manila. In 1946, then future President Diosdado Macapagal and former Dr. Evangelina Macaraeg were wed at the church in 1946.

The church was destroyed by a massive fire in 1949, known as the Great Fire of Meycauayan. Artifacts such as old memorabilia, statues, church vestments, records, ciboriums and chalices were lost in the fire, as well as the retablo in the Spanish colonial style. Only a few church items including the tabernacle were saved by Fr. Jorge Capistrano (currently on display at the parish museum). A committee was formed for the reconstruction of the present church by the priests together with Anselmo de Leon as its head, which campaigned for donations and help from the people for the church's restoration.

In 1984 one year after Former Senator Ninoy Aquino's assassination, the church became the refuge of political activist when the marchers commemorating the anniversary of Ninoy's death in a political march called Tarlac-to-Tarmac were prevented from entering Metro Manila by the Philippine military with a barricade on MacArthur Highway, between Meycauayan and Valenzuela towns. Support for the marchers snowballed from the residents of Meycauayan and the nearby towns, and the marchers were given an invitation to stay in the Church during the standoff. With the outpouring of support for the marchers, the then dictator President Ferdinand Marcos finally allowed the marchers to proceed to Manila International Airport, the final destination of the march after a day of waiting. In hindsight, it was a small victory for the Filipinos from Marcos, a precursor of the People Power Revolution.

The church recently had its interior walls restored and its sanctuary renovated recreating the neoclassic altarpiece of Fr. Benito Madridejos under the term of Rev. Msgr. Adalberto G. Vergara, P.C. The church and its altar was solemnly dedicated by Dennis C. Villarojo, D.D., Bishop of Malolos on November 30, 2020.

=== Meycauayan bells ===
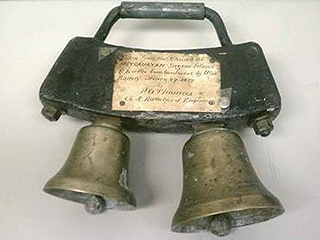
The Meycauayan bells

The Meycauayan bells are hand bells from the Saint Francis Church that was lost during the Philippine–American War. The altar bell are two bells connected by a hard block of dark wood with a handle on top. It is approximately 10 in (250 mm) long and about 3.5 in (89 mm) wide. The 5-pound (2.3 kg) bells were believed taken as war booty from the Mercauayan Church, after it was captured and headquartered by the Americans. A paper note with inscription is attached to the wooden block of the bells that reads: “Taken from the Church at MEYCAUAYAN, Luczon (sic) Islands after bombardment by Utah Battery March 29, 1899. By P.O. Thomas, Co. A Battalion of Engineers.”

The bells were found by archivist Monte Kniffen of the Sisters of Mercy in Omaha, Nebraska in July 2011 among a set of properties that were originally in the possession of their convent in Red Bluff, California. It was not known who gave the bells to the said convent, but Kniffen said that perhaps a small museum or a family could have turned it over to the convent after noting that they were church bells.

On October 8, 2011, the Consul General to Chicago, Leo M. Herrera-Lim, and his wife traveled to Omaha to formally receive the artifact from Sister Judith Frikker, President of the Sisters of Mercy West Midwest Community. Foreign Affairs Secretary Albert Del Rosario turned over the Philippine–American War artifact to Director Jeremy Barns of the National Museum of the Philippines on March 9, 2012. The Roman Catholic Diocese of Malolos received the bells on August 6, 2012, and became part of the Diocesan Museum.

== Gallery ==
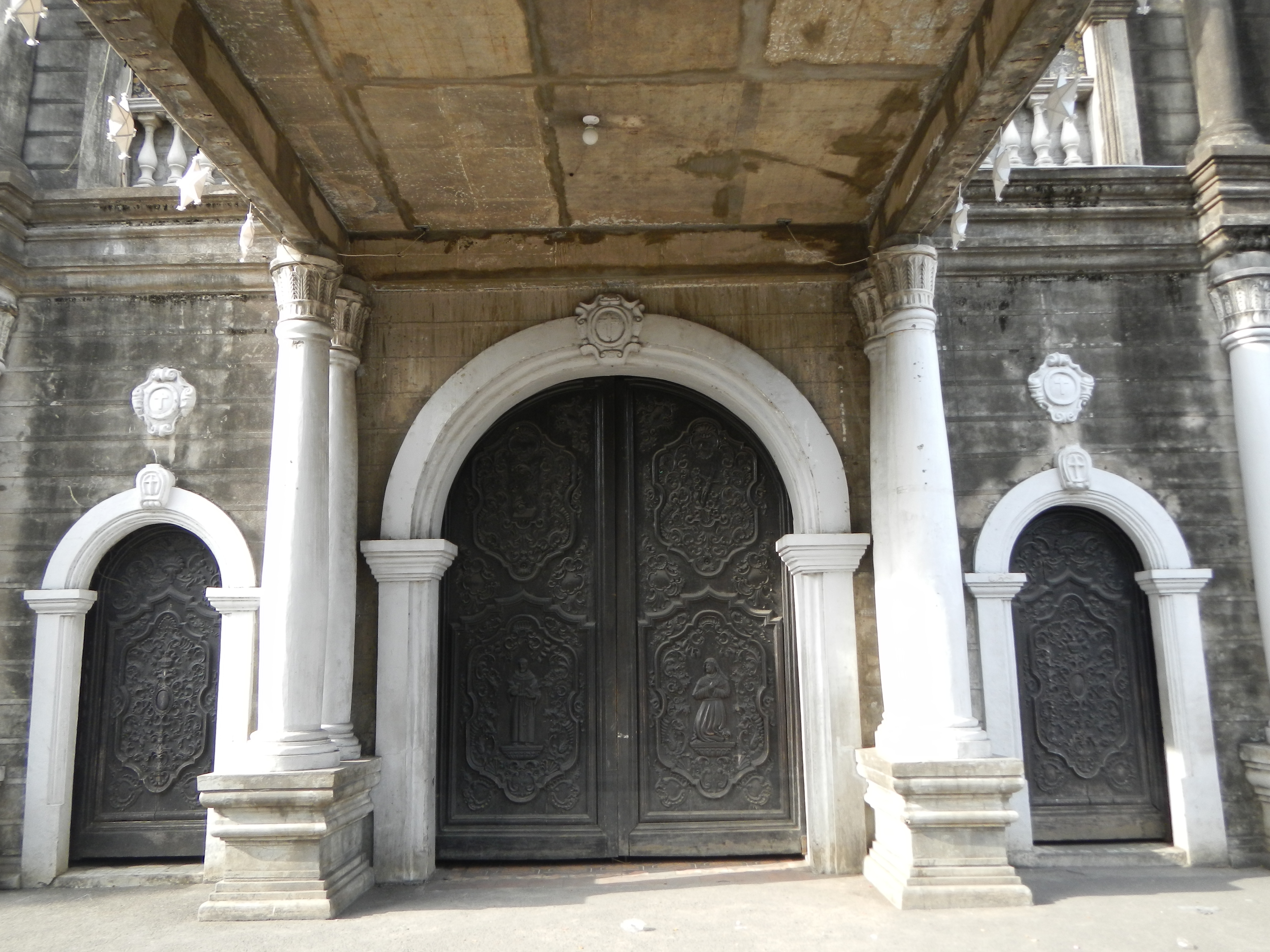
The church's three front portals

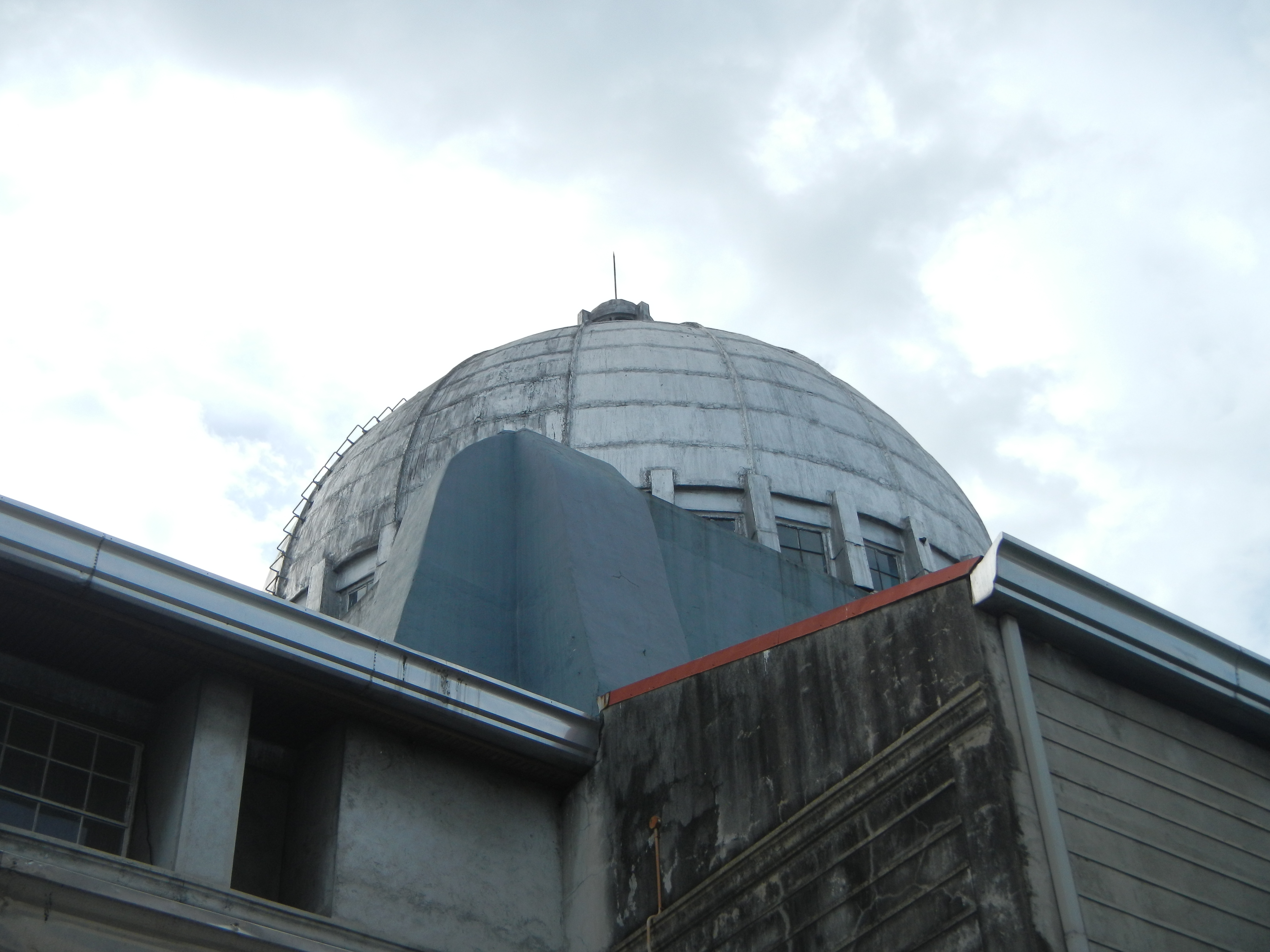
Right transept and dome

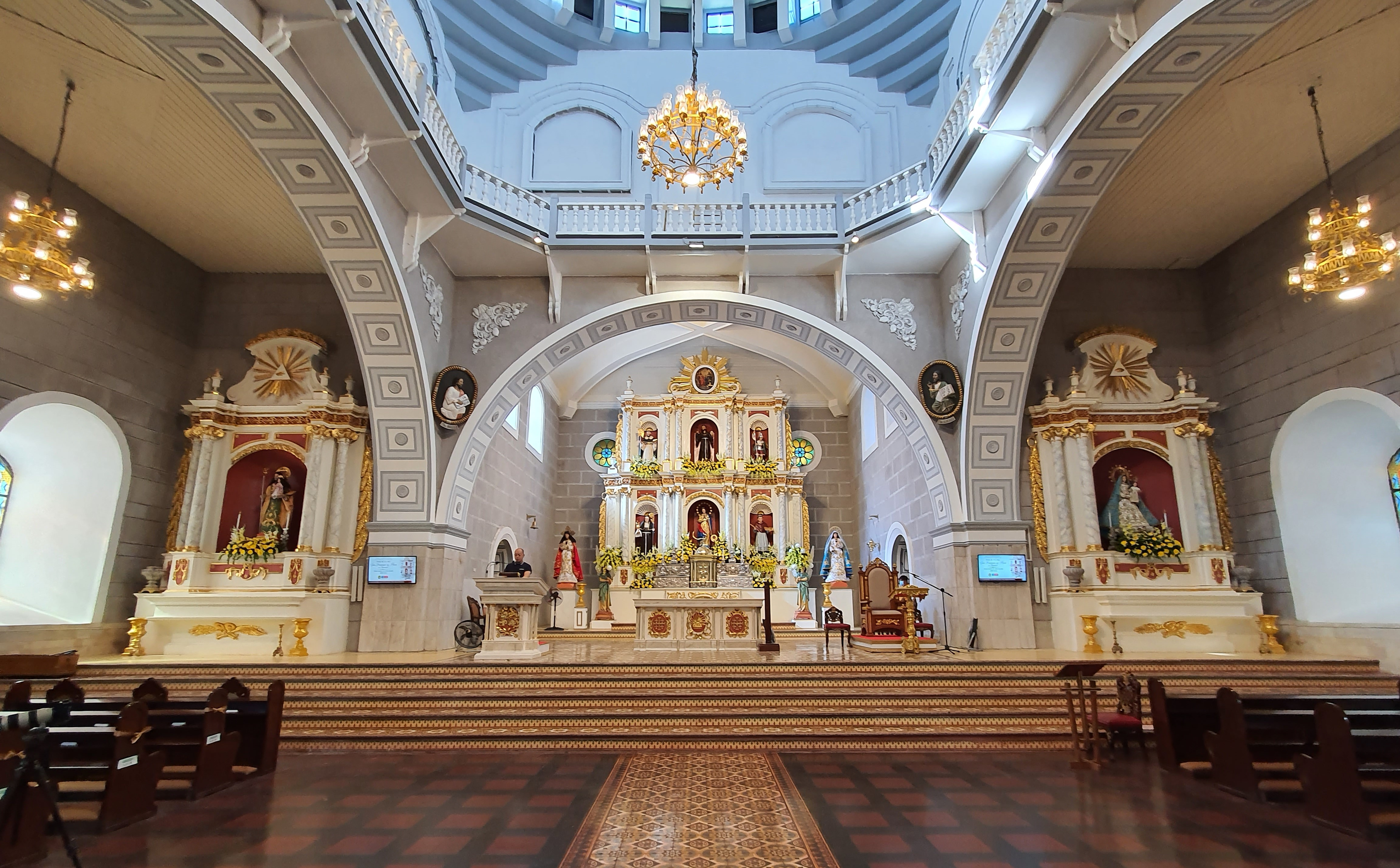
Newly reconstructed altar pieces decorated for its dedication day in 2020

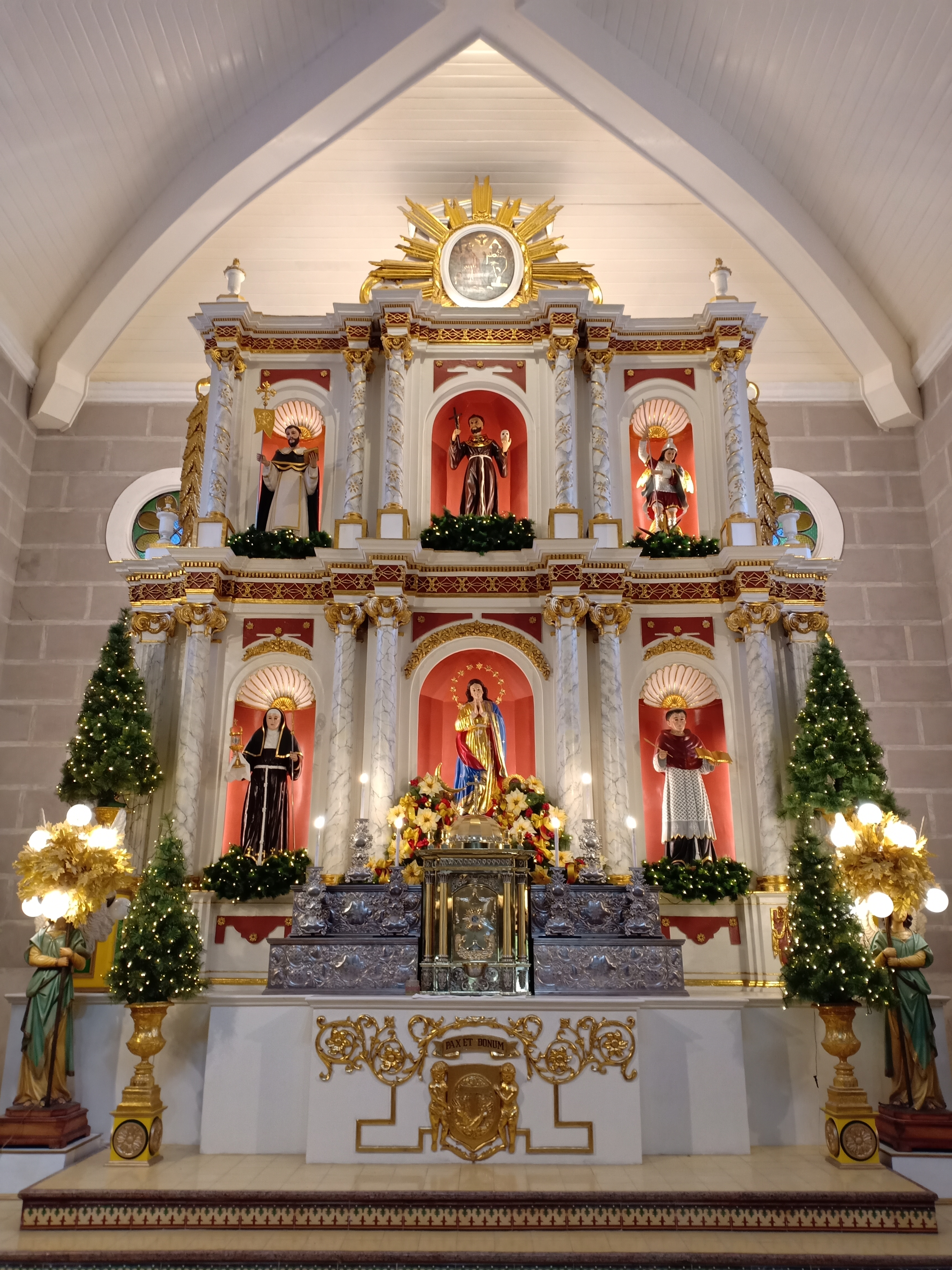
Reconstructed neoclassic retablo mayor interpreted by Ar. Roy John de Guzman

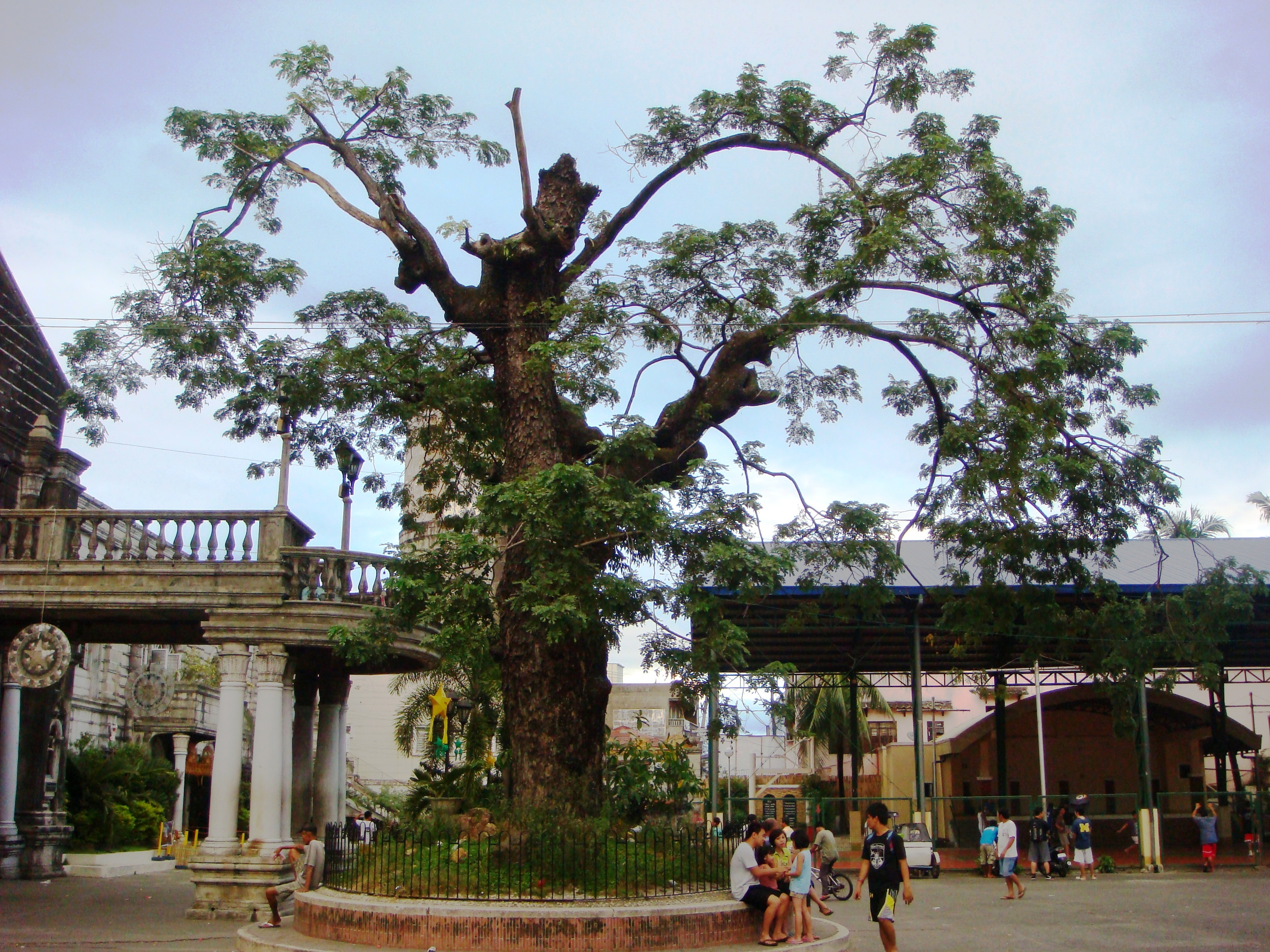
Acacia Tree fronting the church
