= Cross of Sitio Torril =

The Cross of Sitio Torril is probably the oldest religious relic in the town of Meycauayan, Bulacan in the Philippines. It is crafted in the late Baroque style and is dated by Philippine church history expert Regalado Trota Jose at around the late 17th century. Although it may be the oldest church relic found in Meycauayan, it is doubtful that it came from the parish founders Diego de Oropesa and Juan Plasencia.

The cross was erected by Franciscans. It was re-discovered by three members of the St. Francis parish's Committee on Church Cultural Heritage in the year 2001. The cross was in the custody of the late Fidel Amparo of Barangay Bahay Pari, whose house is near the site of what is believed to be the original site of the first parish church and/or the first town center. Upon his death, the cross has been turned over to the barrio chapel. The cross is loaned every year to the parish church of St. Francis of Assisi on its feast day of October 4.

The cross is on Bahay Pari Chapel (Sitio Toril) and loaned every 3rd week of September to Meycauayan Church sign that the feast is near called (LAKBAYAN).
