= Retention of the frigate Libertad in Ghana =

Diplomatic Incident between Argentina and Ghana

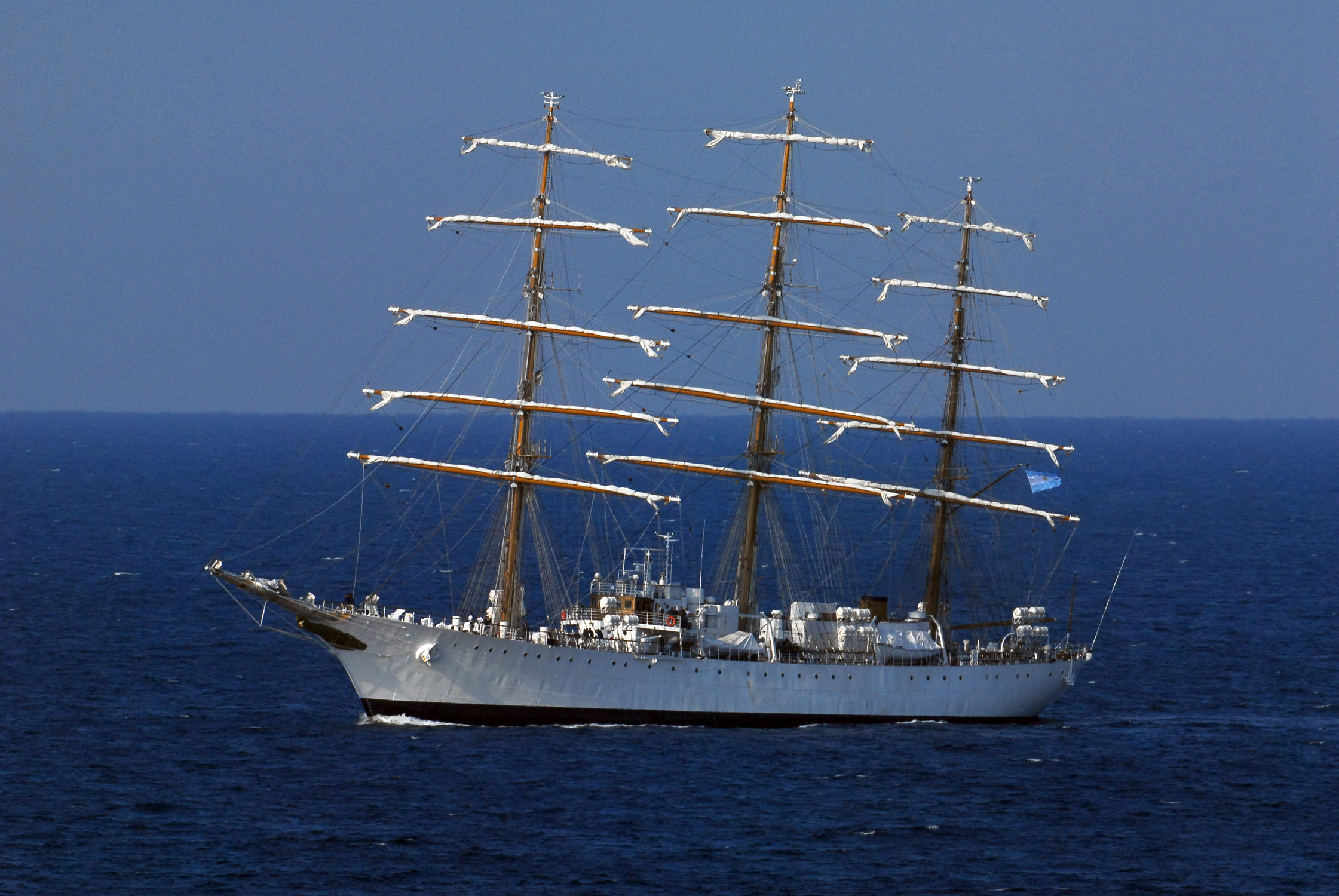
Argentine frigate Libertad in 2007

The retention of the frigate Libertad in Ghana was an episode that occurred on October 2, 2012, in which the frigate ARA Libertad, training ship of the Argentine Navy, was detained in the Ghanaian port of Tema due to a claim by vulture funds. The amparo appeal that triggered the retention of the ship was presented before the Ghanaian courts by the NML Capital Group, based in the Cayman Islands, to collect debt papers that did not enter into the exchange of the default of 2001. For its part, the Argentine Ministry of Foreign Affairs described this legal action as a "cunning attack against Argentina [by] the vulture funds". On the occasion, Foreign Minister Héctor Timerman affirmed that warships could not be seized, following international legislation in this regard. Meanwhile, President Cristina Fernández de Kirchner maintained that "as long as I am president, they will be able to keep the frigate, but the freedom, dignity, and sovereignty of this country, no one will keep."

Despite the pressure exerted by the vulture funds in the Ghanaian courts and the media controversy surrounding the matter, the Minister of Economy Hernán Lorenzino affirmed that Argentina would continue to pay its debt commitments to 93% of bond holders that entered the 2005 and 2010 swaps and would maintain its policy of not paying vulture funds that wanted to obtain full payment of the debt in default. "We are going to continue paying 93% of the creditors that entered the swap, in dollars, euros, and yen, as appropriate; we are going to respect 93% of the bondholders, many Argentines, who made the effort that some wily people want to take advantage of" the minister declared, at the request of the president.

Ultimately, following the guidelines of the United Nations Convention on the Law of the Sea (UNCLOS), it was ruled that Ghana—by keeping the ARA Libertad detained, not allowing it to refuel, and taking various judicial measures in against it—violated its international obligation to respect the immunities of jurisdiction and execution granted the vessel by UNCLOS Article 32 and Article 3 of the 1926 Convention for the Unification of Certain Rules relating to the immunity of vessels state property, as well as other strongly established rules of general or customary international law. Ghana had denied the Libertad and its crew from their right to leave the state's jurisdictional waters and the right of freedom of navigation. Finally, the International Sea Tribunal affirmed the international responsibility of Ghana, ordering the state to cease the violations immediately, pay adequate compensation, and offer a solemn salute to the Argentine flag as satisfaction for the moral damage caused.

== Beginning of the crisis ==
The frigate Libertad had sailed from Buenos Aires on June 2, 2012, with more than 300 sailors on board to make its annual trip instruction. It docked at ports in Brazil, Suriname, Guyana, Venezuela, Portugal, Spain, Morocco, and Senegal before arriving at the Ghana port of Tema on October 2. There, the ship was detained by the Ghana government due to a court claim put forth by private creditors of unpaid bonds. The creditors demanded Argentina pay a debt on bonds that became delinquent in 2001, during the country's economic crisis, but were subsequently refinanced.

In response to the ship's detention in Tema, the Argentine government ordered the evacuation of the ship on October 20, 2012, due to a "lack of guarantees for the human rights of its 326 crew members". A total of 281 crew members were evacuated. In the same statement, the Foreign Ministry also accused the Ghanaian justice system of aspiring for a "sovereign country [Argentina]" to negotiate "with an entity dedicated to financial piracy from its fiscal lair in the Caribbean", stated that the retention of the Navy's flagship was "a kidnapping, extortion and an act of piracy" against Argentina and that the "Argentine government has been forced to make this decision since Ghana's decision, in addition to violating international law, puts the integrity of the crew at risk, since it denies them the necessary supplies to keep a ship in port". Additionally, the San Martín Palace statement reported that "All foreigners who participated in the training trip would also be evacuated in the same operation."

For the maintenance and care of the frigate, a minimum number of 44 soldiers was available. This contingent defended its position with arms when port authorities tried to move the ship from berth number 11, where it was located, to another less traveled place after the port authorities cut off the water and electricity supply to the frigate to force its transfer. With diplomatic intervention, the incident was corrected and the water and power supply to the ship was restored, without the need to move the ship from its berth.

== Steps for recovery ==
After the Ghanaian authorities' retention of the Libertad, the Argentine government began steps to achieve the release of the ship and its subsequent return to the country. On October 9, 2012, Argentina requested to the Commercial Court of Ghana for the immediate release of the frigate, arguing that warships were not subject to embargoes, invoking diplomatic immunity of the school ship according to the Vienna Convention. However, two days later, the court rejected Argentina's request, arguing there is not "sufficient grounds put forward by the plaintiff to dismiss the judgment of the court".

At that time, the crew was composed of 192 non-commissioned officers, 69 Argentine midshipmen, 15 Chileans, 8 Uruguayans, 26 staff officers, and 13 special guests who belonged to other armed forces of Argentina and other nations of South America.

Faced with this rejection, the Argentine Foreign Ministry issued a statement in which it affirmed its willingness to "exhaust the judicial instances of Ghana and the international courts in defense of its sovereignty, against the vulture funds and those who try to impose a global system where the peoples live subject to speculative capital".

During the efforts to achieve the release of the frigate Libertad, Minister of Foreign Affairs Héctor Timerman announced that Argentina will demand that Ghana be declared "internationally responsible" for the illegal embargo and that Ghana should be forced to "compensate Argentina for the damages caused and to redress the national symbols". Timerman pointed out that the process will run at the International Tribunal for the Law of the Sea (ITLOS), to deal with Ghana's international responsibility for the illegal embargo of the frigate.

Faced with the refusal of the Ghanaian judicial authorities, Argentina addressed a proposal to the United Nations (UN) to analyze the situation, which directly affected the immunity system of UN states by not respecting the immunity of a military vessel. With this agenda, Héctor Timerman met with the UN Secretary General Ban Ki-moon. After deliberating on this Argentine proposal, the International Maritime Organization (IMO), a body dependent on the UN, resolved on November 28, 2012, that the Libertad was a warship and it therefore had immunity and could not be seized. Definitive proof of its status as a military vessel was presented by the Argentine ambassador to the United Kingdom, Alicia Castro, who finally demonstrated that the Libertad lacked an IMO registration number for commercial vessels because it was a warship.

Finally, on December 15, 2012, more than two months after the initial detention, the ITLOS ordered Ghana, by unanimous decision, to immediately release the Libertad. The court ruled that "Ghana must unconditionally release the frigate, ensuring that the ship, its commander and crew can leave the port of Tema and ensuring its provisioning" and also pondered that the warship was an "expression of Argentine sovereignty" and that Ghana's decision to hijack and retain the ship affected diplomatic immunity under international law. ITLOS set December 22 as the maximum term for compliance with the judgment, stating Ghana should comply with the ruling and release the ship "without conditions", and that the parties involved would share the costs of the process. Upon hearing the news, the president of Argentina, Cristina Fernández de Kirchner, celebrated by announcing on her Twitter account: "Once again we comply: the Fragata returns".

== Release and return to Argentina ==
On December 18, 2012, the Foreign Minister of Ghana announced that it would request the revocation of the court order that held the frigate Libertad in the country, in the sense that it would comply with the ruling of the International Court for the Law of the Sea and realize their release. After refueling and conditioning the ship—and after the embarkation of the 98 crew members who had been sent from Buenos Aires to rebuild the crew—the Libertad left Tema on December 19, 2012. Ambassador Susana Ruiz Cerutti, architect of the Argentine legal strategy that enabled the return of the Libertad, and the Minister of Justice and Attorney General of Ghana, Marietta Brew Appiah-Oponq, signed the agreement to terminate the arbitration process. The Supreme Court of Ghana considered the original judge in error for not declining his jurisdiction in an attempt to seize an asset of a sovereign state affected for military purposes. Meanwhile, the Supreme Court of Ghana ruled that the retention by the Ghanaian authorities of the Libertad was unfair, stating that the decision to retain the Argentine ship could have endangered the security of Ghana and potentially triggered a military and diplomatic conflict.

Libertad arrived in Mar del Plata on January 9, 2013. In celebration of the ship's return, an act was held, led by President Cristina Fernández de Kirchner. In her speech, the president affirmed that the ship "symbolizes the unrestricted defense of the sovereign rights of Argentina and its national dignity" and added, "Today more than ever, a country yes, a colony no."

No representative of the political opposition was present at the ceremony, even though invitations were extended to them. Regarding the absence of opponents, the chief of staff said, "When the frigate was embargoed, they [opponents] cried out to give in to the onslaught of vulture funds, and when it returns to Argentina, [...] they turn their backs not on the government, but on the Argentine people [...]". Ricardo Alfonsín of the Radical Civic Union opined that "All Argentines celebrate the return of the frigate Libertad. But as a citizen I am also saddened by the use that the Government makes".

== Alternate proposals ==
Despite the national government's decision not to yield to the pressure of vulture funds, some opposition leaders presented alternative proposals. Deputy Alberto Asseff presented a bill in the Chamber for the National Executive Branch to promote the creation of a "Patriotic Fund" of 20 million dollars, aimed at lifting the embargo on vulture funds. That money would be raised through donations. This proposal, however, did not have major repercussions on the Chamber of Deputies. Recalling that attitude, the president, in her speech on the frigate's arrival, said, "there were vultures, and here were squawks of caranchos. But we did not listen to any of them." Former president Néstor Kirchner stated, "Paradoxically, many of those who said that we had to kneel were those who had put Argentina in debt."

For his part, former senator of the Radical Civic Union, José María García Arecha, presented a plan to create an open account in a state bank so that citizens of the entire country could "collaborate" and thus gather the necessary amount to pay to Ghana's justice and lift the embargo. This proposal, also supported by parties such as the Republican Proposal (PRO), could not be carried out either, as the lawyers consulted indicated that the initiative could harm the negotiations of the government. The referent of this party, the Head of Government of Buenos Aires, Mauricio Macri, insisted on paying the vulture funds, even after the return of the frigate to the country. The Supreme Court of Ghana ordered the Elliot vulture fund (parent company of the Group NML Capital) to pay about 8 million dollars to the management of the port of Tema, for the expenses of having hijacked the Libertad.

== See also ==
- Argentine debt restructuring
- International Tribunal for the Law of the Sea
